= Snatch Game (RuPaul's Drag Race season 5) =

- RuPaul's Drag Race episode
- Episode no.: Season 5 Episode 5
- Original air date: February 25, 2013

Guest appearances
- Julie Brown (guest judge); Downtown Julie Brown (guest judge)

Episode chronology
← Previous "Black Swan: Why It Gotta Be Black?"	Next → "Can I Get an Amen"
- RuPaul's Drag Race season 5

"Snatch Game" is the fifth episode of the fifth season of the American television series RuPaul's Drag Race. It originally aired on February 25, 2013. The episode's main challenge tasks the contestants with impersonating celebrities during the Snatch Game. Julie Brown and Downtown Julie Brown are guest judges. Jinkx Monsoon wins the main challenge. Lineysha Sparx is eliminated from the competition after placing in the bottom and losing a lip-sync against Detox to "Take Me Home" by Cher.

== Episode ==
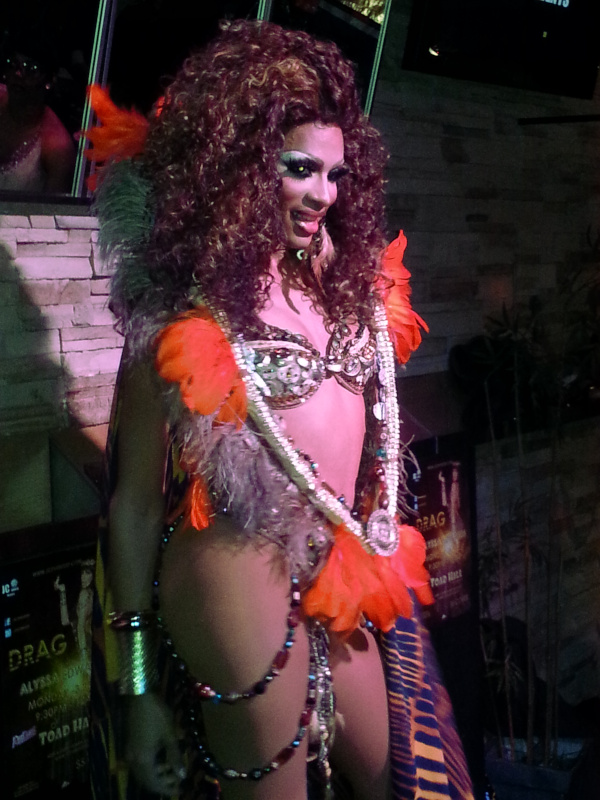
Lineysha Sparx is eliminated from the competition.

The contestants return to the workroom after Honey Mahogany and Vivienne Pinay were eliminated on the previous episode. On a new day, RuPaul greets the group and reveals the mini-challenge, which tasks the contestants with styling a cuddler into a red carpet ready look for an Us Weekly fashion face-off. Alyssa Edwards, Detox, and Roxxxy Andrews are declared winners of the mini-challenge. RuPaul then reveals the main challenge, which tasks the contestants with impersonating celebrities in the Snatch Game.

The contestants start to prepare for the game. RuPaul returns to the workroom to meet with each contestant, asking questions and offering advice. Before leaving, RuPaul shares that Julie Brown and Downtown Julie Brown are guest judges. The contestants make final preparations, then the game commences with Brown and Downtown Julie Brown as celebrity guests. Following are the contestants and impersonated celebrities:

- Alaska as Lady Bunny
- Alyssa Edwards as Katy Perry
- Coco Montrese as Janet Jackson
- Detox as Kesha
- Ivy Winters as Marilyn Monroe
- Jade Jolie as Taylor Swift
- Jinkx Monsoon as Little Edie
- Lineysha Sparx as Celia Cruz
- Roxxxy Andrews as Tamar Braxton

On elimination day, the contestants discuss how the game went and make final preparations for the fashion show. On the main stage, RuPaul welcomes fellow judges Michelle Visage and Santino Rice, as well as guest judges Brown and Downtown Julie Brown. RuPaul shares the assignment of the main challenge and the runway category ("Deadliest Snatch"), then the fashion show commences. The judges deliver their critiques, deliberate, then share the results with the contestants. Jinkx Monsoon is declared the winner. Detox and Lineysha Sparx place in the bottom and face off in a lip-sync contest to "Take Me Home" (1979) by Cher. Detox wins the lip-sync and Lineysha Sparx is eliminated from the competition.

== Production and broadcast ==
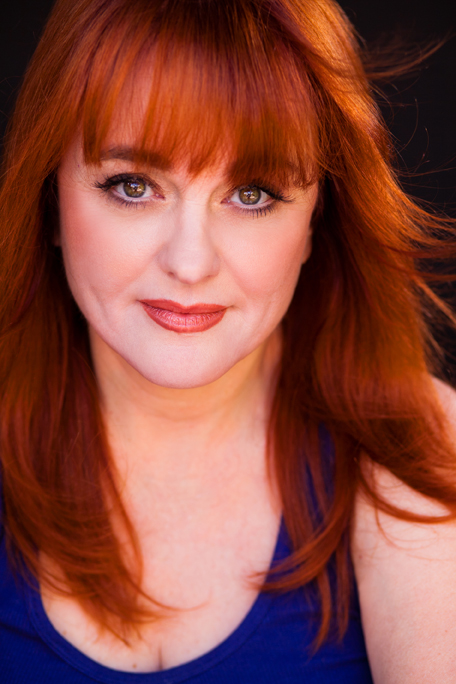
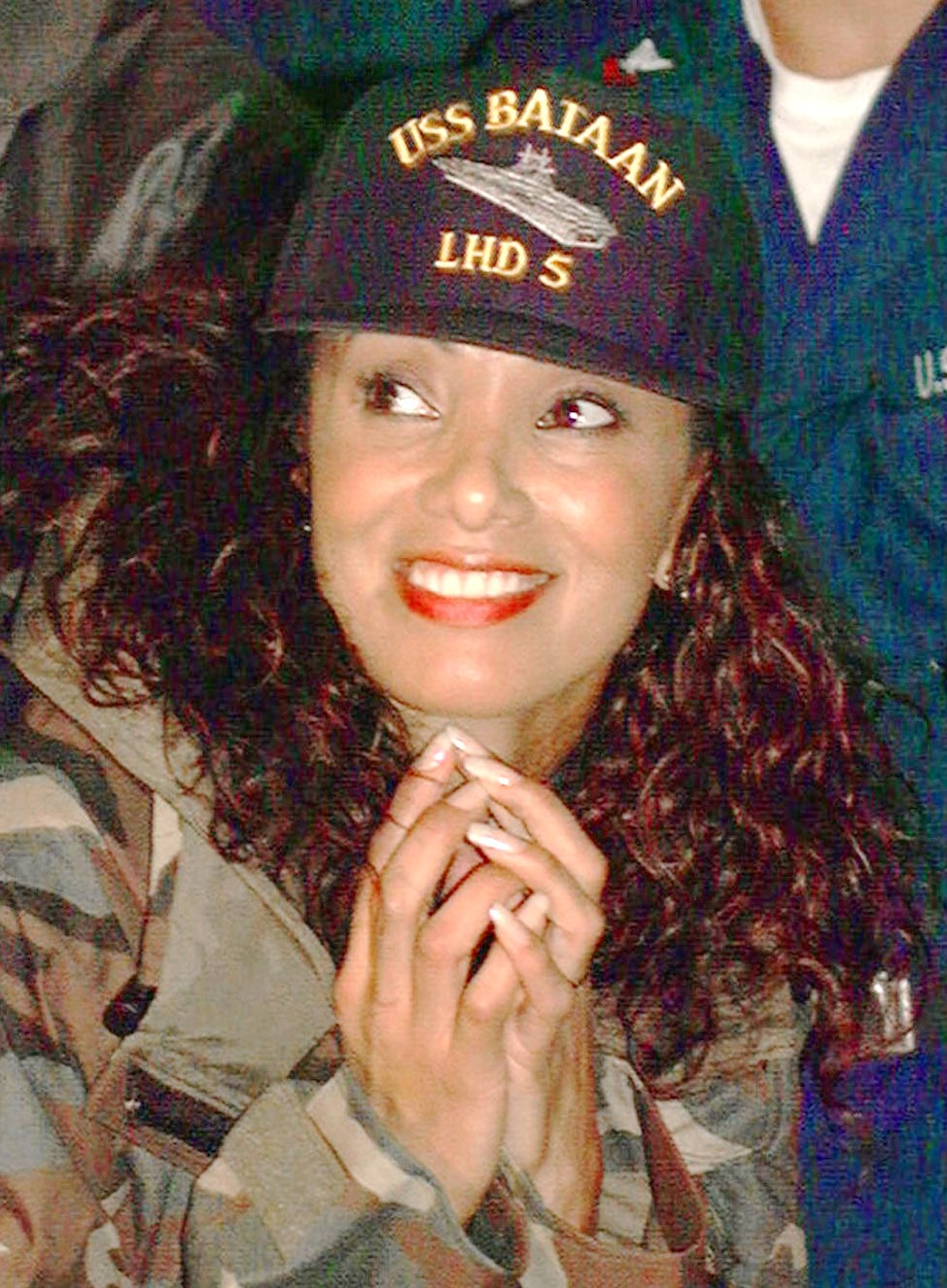
Julie Brown (left) and Downtown Julie Brown (right) are guest judges.

The episode originally aired on February 25, 2013.

Shawn Morales is among members of the Pit Crew in the episode.

In the workroom, Alyssa Edwards says, "Look how orange you look" to Coco Montrese. Coco Montrese says, "I'm not joking, bitch!"

=== Fashion ===
In the workroom, RuPaul wears a red suit with a bow tie. For the main stage, RuPaul has a black-and-purple outfit and a dark headband.

For the fashion show, Ivy Winters wears a fish-inspired dress and a large blonde wig. Detox has a short puffy jellyfish-inspired dress and a blonde wig. Jade Jolie's dark outfit has many chains. She wears a brown wig. Roxxxy Andrews has a jacket and a blonde wig. Jinkx Monsoon wears a colorful dress, a headband, and a blonde wig. Coco Montrese has a pink-and-white outfit with tall pink boots and a long blonde wig. Alyssa Edwards wears a purple dress and a fascinator. Lineysha Sparx has an asymmetrical black outfit and a dark wig. Alaska wears a green-and-pink dress, a pink necklace, and a flower in her hair. She carries a fake fish as a prop.

== Reception ==
Oliver Sava of The A.V. Club gave the episode a rating of 'A'.

== See also ==
- Cultural impact of Taylor Swift
- Janet Jackson as a gay icon
- Marilyn Monroe in popular culture
