= RuPaul's Drag Race season 5 =

2013 season of RuPaul's Drag Race

RuPaul's Drag Race
- Season 5
- Promotional poster for season five
- Hosted by: RuPaul
- Judges: RuPaul; Michelle Visage; Santino Rice
- No. of contestants: 14
- Winner: Jinkx Monsoon
- Runners-up: Alaska; Roxxxy Andrews
- Miss Congeniality: Ivy Winters
- Companion show: RuPaul's Drag Race: Untucked!
- No. of episodes: 14

Release
- Original network: Logo TV
- Original release: January 28 – May 6, 2013

Season chronology
- ← Previous; Season 4 Next → Season 6

The fifth season of RuPaul's Drag Race began airing on January 28, 2013, with a 90-minute premiere episode, and ended on May 6 of the same year. The winner of season five headlined Logo's Drag Race Tour featuring Absolut Vodka, won a one-of-a-kind trip, a lifetime supply of Colorevolution Cosmetics, and a cash prize of $100,000. Santino Rice and Michelle Visage returned as judges at the panel.

The theme song playing during the runway every episode is "I Bring the Beat", while the song playing during the credits is "The Beginning". Both songs are from RuPaul's album Glamazon.

This is the first-ever series in the show's history to feature a double elimination or a double sashay between two contestants, Honey Mahogany and Vivienne Pinay. It is also the first series to feature a queen, Coco Montrese, lip-sync for their life four times and send 3 people home. This is also the first series where RuPaul allowed fans to vote for a winner.

The winner of the fifth season of RuPaul's Drag Race was Jinkx Monsoon, with Alaska and Roxxxy Andrews being the runners-up, and Ivy Winters being crowned season 5's Miss Congeniality by fans.

== Contestants ==
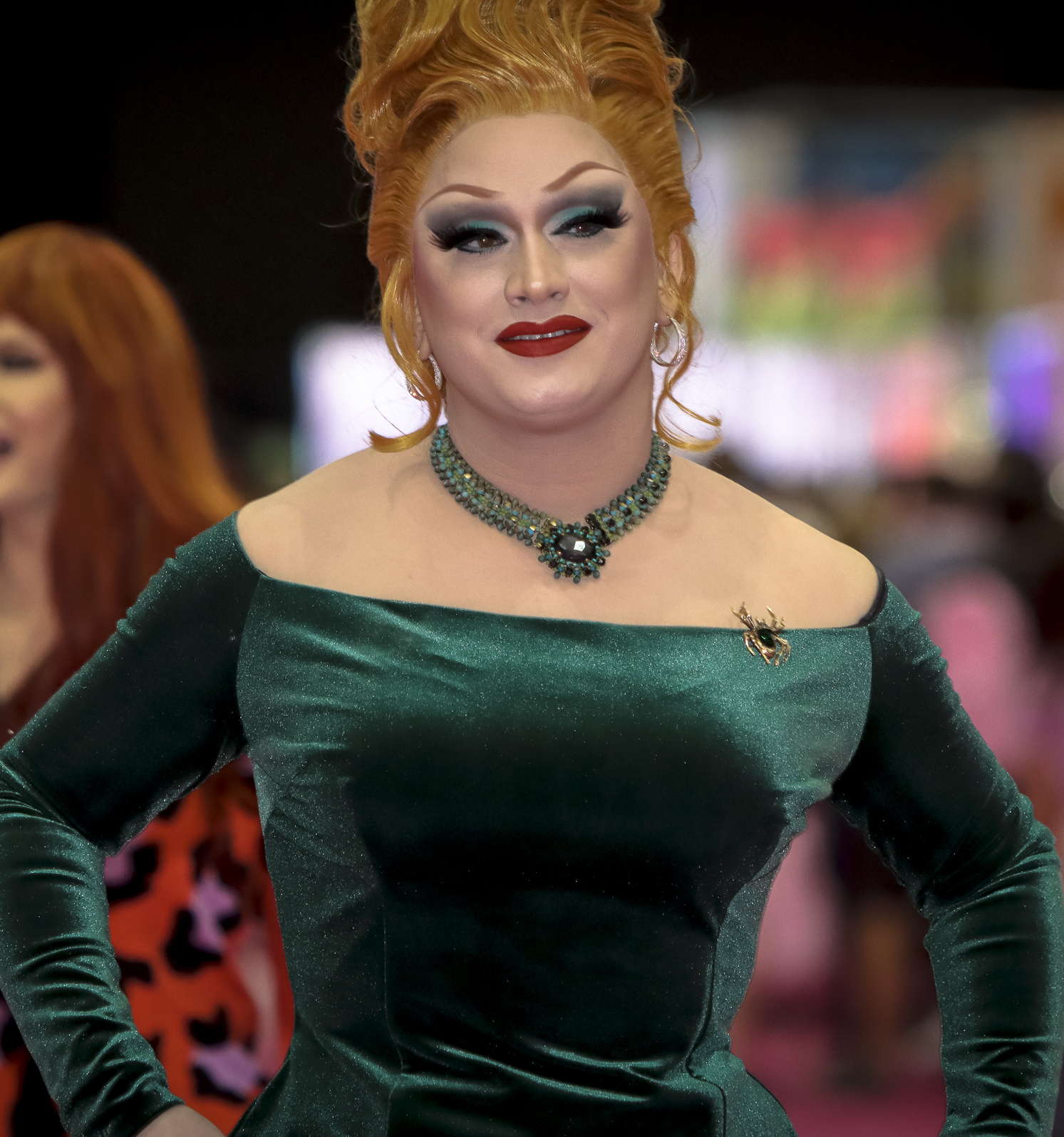
The winner, Jinkx Monsoon

Ages, names, and cities stated are at time of filming.

Contestants of RuPaul's Drag Race season 5 and their backgrounds
Contestant	Age	Hometown	Outcome
Jinkx Monsoon	24	Seattle, Washington	Winner
Alaska (Note: Alaska Thunderfuck 5000 is referred to as Alaska on the show.)	27	Pittsburgh, Pennsylvania	Runners-up
Roxxxy Andrews	28	Orlando, Florida	Runners-up
Detox (Note: Detox Icunt is referred to as Detox on the show.)	27	Los Angeles, California	4th place
Coco Montrese	37	Las Vegas, Nevada	5th place
Alyssa Edwards	32	Mesquite, Texas	6th place
Ivy Winters	26	New York City, New York	7th place (Note: Ivy Winters was voted Miss Congeniality by the viewers.)
Jade Jolie	25	Gainesville, Florida	8th place
Lineysha Sparx	24	San Juan, Puerto Rico	9th place
Honey Mahogany	29	San Francisco, California	10th place
Vivienne Pinay	26	New York City, New York	10th place
Monica Beverly Hillz	27	Owensboro, Kentucky	12th place
Serena ChaCha Pa Fuera	21	Tallahassee, Florida	13th place
Penny Tration	39	Cincinnati, Ohio	14th place

== Contestant progress ==
Legend:

Jinkx Monsoon won RuPaul's Drag Race season 5.
Alaska and Roxxxy Andrews were the runners-up.
Ivy Winters was voted Miss Congeniality (Miss C) by the viewers.
WIN indicates that the contestant won the challenge.
SAFE indicates that the contestant was declared safe by the judges.
IMM (Immunity) indicates that the contestant was immune for the episode.
BTM (Bottom) indicates that the contestant was up for elimination.
ELIM (Eliminated) indicates that the contestant was eliminated.
Guest indicates that the contestant returned as a guest.

Contestants progress with placements in each episode
Contestant	Episode												
Contestant	1	2	3	4	5	6	7	8	9	10	11	12	14
Jinkx Monsoon	SAFE	SAFE	SAFE	SAFE	WIN	SAFE	SAFE	SAFE	WIN	SAFE	BTM	SAFE	Winner
Alaska	SAFE	SAFE	SAFE	SAFE	SAFE	SAFE	SAFE	WIN	SAFE	SAFE	WIN	SAFE	Runner-up
Roxxxy Andrews	WIN	IMM	SAFE	SAFE	SAFE	SAFE	BTM	SAFE	SAFE	WIN	SAFE	SAFE	Runner-up
Detox	SAFE	SAFE	WIN	IMM	BTM	SAFE	SAFE	SAFE	SAFE	BTM	ELIM		Guest
Coco Montrese	SAFE	SAFE	BTM	SAFE	SAFE	BTM	WIN	SAFE	BTM	ELIM			Guest
Alyssa Edwards	SAFE	SAFE	SAFE	WIN	IMM	SAFE	BTM	BTM	ELIM				Guest
Ivy Winters	SAFE	SAFE	SAFE	SAFE	SAFE	WIN	SAFE	ELIM					Miss C
Jade Jolie	SAFE	SAFE	SAFE	SAFE	SAFE	ELIM							Guest
Lineysha Sparx	SAFE	WIN	IMM	SAFE	ELIM								Guest
Honey Mahogany	SAFE	SAFE	SAFE	ELIM									Guest
Vivienne Pinay	SAFE	SAFE	SAFE	ELIM									Guest
Monica Beverly Hillz	SAFE	BTM	ELIM										Guest
Serena ChaCha	BTM	ELIM											Guest
Penny Tration	ELIM												Guest

== Lip syncs ==
Legend:

The contestant was eliminated after their first time in the bottom.
The contestant was eliminated after their second time in the bottom.
The contestant was eliminated after their third time in the bottom.
The contestant was eliminated after their fourth time in the bottom.

Episode	Contestants			Song	Eliminated
1	Penny Tration	vs.	Serena ChaCha	"Party in the U.S.A." (Miley Cyrus)	Penny Tration
2	Monica Beverly Hillz	vs.	Serena ChaCha	"Only Girl (In the World)" (Rihanna)	Serena ChaCha
3	Coco Montrese	vs.	Monica Beverly Hillz	"When I Grow Up" (The Pussycat Dolls)	Monica Beverly Hillz
4	Honey Mahogany	vs.	Vivienne Pinay	"Oops!... I Did It Again" (Britney Spears)	Honey Mahogany
4	Honey Mahogany	vs.	Vivienne Pinay	"Oops!... I Did It Again" (Britney Spears)	Vivienne Pinay
5	Detox	vs.	Lineysha Sparx	"Take Me Home" (Cher)	Lineysha Sparx
6	Coco Montrese	vs.	Jade Jolie	"I'm So Excited" (The Pointer Sisters)	Jade Jolie
7	Alyssa Edwards	vs.	Roxxxy Andrews	"Whip My Hair" (Willow Smith)	None
8	Alyssa Edwards	vs.	Ivy Winters	"Ain't Nothin' Goin' On but the Rent" (Gwen Guthrie)	Ivy Winters
9	Alyssa Edwards	vs.	Coco Montrese	"Cold Hearted" (Paula Abdul)	Alyssa Edwards
10	Coco Montrese	vs.	Detox	"Two to Make It Right" (Seduction)	Coco Montrese
11	Detox	vs.	Jinkx Monsoon	"Malambo No. 1" (Yma Sumac)	Detox
12	Alaska vs. Jinkx Monsoon vs. Roxxxy Andrews			"The Beginning" (RuPaul)	None

== Guest judges ==
Listed in chronological order:

- Camille Grammer, television personality
- Mike Ruiz, photographer
- Kristen Johnston, actress
- Juliette Lewis, actress and singer
- Coco Austin, model
- Paulina Porizkova, model and actress
- Chaz Bono, writer and activist
- Travis Wall, dancer
- Julie Brown, actress-comedian
- Downtown Julie Brown, actress and MTV VJ
- La Toya Jackson, singer
- The Pointer Sisters (Anita and Ruth), girl group
- Leslie Jordan, actor
- Jeffrey Moran, Absolut Vodka marketing/branding executive
- Aubrey O’Day, singer
- Joan Van Ark, actress
- María Conchita Alonso, singer/songwriter and actress
- Jamie-Lynn Sigler, actress and singer
- Clinton Kelly, fashion stylist
- George Kotsiopoulos, editor and fashion consultant
- Marg Helgenberger, actress
- Bob Mackie, fashion designer

=== Special guests ===
Guests who appeared in episodes, but did not judge on the main stage:

Episode 4

- Nick Lazzarini, dancer and winner of So You Think You Can Dance season 1

Episode 5

- Ian Drew, Entertainment Director of Us Weekly

Episode 6

- Lucian Piane, composer and record producer

Episode 7

- Deven Green, comedian and musician
- Nadya Ginsberg, comedian, actress, and writer
- Bruce Vilanch, writer and actor

Episode 9

- Wilmer Valderrama, actor

Episode 12

- Gloria Allred, lawyer
- Mathu Andersen, make-up artist and photographer
- Candis Cayne, actress and performance artist

Episode 13

- Latrice Royale, contestant on season 4 and All Stars season 1
- Willam, contestant on season 4
- Sharon Needles, winner of season 4

Episode 14

- Paula Abdul, singer, dancer, and actress (via video message)
- Latrice Royale, "Miss Congeniality" of season 4 and contestant on All Stars season 1

== Episodes ==
No. overall	No. in season	Title	Original release date
52	1	"RuPaullywood or Bust"	January 28, 2013
Fourteen new queens enter the workroom. For the first mini-challenge, the queens do an underwater photoshoot. Detox wins the mini-challenge. For the main challenge, the queens create a Hollywood realness and glamour outfit made from items found in a dumpster. On the runway, Alaska, Ivy Winters, Lineysha Sparx and Roxxxy Andrews receive positive critiques, with Roxxxy Andrews winning the challenge. Jade Jolie, Penny Tration and Serena ChaCha receive negative critiques, with Jade Jolie being safe. Penny Tration and Serena ChaCha lip-sync to "Party in the U.S.A." by Miley Cyrus. Serena ChaCha wins the lip-sync and Penny Tration is the first queen to sashay away.: Guest Judges: Camille Grammer and Mike Ruiz; Mini-Challenge: Underwater photoshoot; Mini-Challenge Winner: Detox; Main Challenge: Create a Hollywood realness and glamour outfit made from items found in a dumpster; Challenge Winner: Roxxxy Andrews; Challenge Prize: A custom gown by Marco Marco; Bottom Two: Penny Tration and Serena ChaCha; Lip-Sync Song: "Party in the U.S.A." by Miley Cyrus; Eliminated: Penny Tration; Farewell message: "You ARE ALL STARS smooches PT"
53	2	"Lip Synch Extravaganza Eleganza"	February 4, 2013
For this week's mini-challenge, the queens lip-sync to one of RuPaul's songs with only their mouths visible. Detox, Ivy Winters and Serena ChaCha win the mini-challenge. For the main challenge, the queens team up to lip-sync and re-enact famous scenes from a past season of RuPaul's Drag Race: Untucked.: Team Detox (Season 4, Episodes 1 and 8): Alaska, Coco Montrese, Detox and Monica Beverly Hillz; Team Ivy Winters (Season 2, Episodes 1 and 5): Honey Mahogany, Ivy Winters, Lineysha Sparx and Vivienne Pinay; Team Serena ChaCha (Season 3, Episodes 3 and 5): Alyssa Edwards, Jade Jolie, Jinkx Monsoon, Roxxxy Andrews and Serena ChaCha; On the runway, category is Best Drag. Team Ivy Winters is the winning team, with Lineysha Sparx winning the challenge. Team Detox and Team Serena ChaCha are the losing teams. Monica Beverly Hillz and Serena ChaCha receive negative critiques, and are announced as the bottom two. They lip-sync to "Only Girl (In the World)" by Rihanna. Monica Beverly Hillz wins the lip-sync and Serena ChaCha sashays away.: Guest Judges: Kristen Johnston and Juliette Lewis; Mini-Challenge: Lip-sync to one of RuPaul's songs with only your mouth visible; Mini-Challenge Winners: Detox, Ivy Winters and Serena ChaCha; Main Challenge: In teams, lip-sync and re-enact a famous scene from a past season of RuPaul's Drag Race Untucked; Runway Theme: Best Drag; Challenge Winner: Lineysha Sparx; Challenge Prize: A custom latex garment from Syren Latex; Bottom Two: Monica Beverly Hillz and Serena ChaCha; Lip-Sync Song: "Only Girl (In the World)" by Rihanna; Eliminated: Serena ChaCha; Farewell Message: "God bless America, Viva Panama, Keep bearing light QUEENS xoxo Serena ChaCha"
54	3	"Draggle Rock"	February 11, 2013
For this week's mini-challenge, the queens create a mannequin doll in pairs for "America's Junior Drag Superstar" pageant. Alaska and Lineysha Sparx win the mini-challenge with the creation of Lil' Poundcake. For the main challenge, the queens team up and star in two different children's TV shows.: Team Alaska starring in "Buffalo Bill's Barnyard Buddies": Alaska, Alyssa Edwards, Detox, Monica Beverly Hillz, Roxxxy Andrews and Vivienne Pinay; Team Lineysha Sparx starring in "The Magic Bush": Coco Montrese, Honey Mahogany, Ivy Winters, Jade Jolie, Jinkx Monsoon and Lineysha Sparx; On the runway, category is Pretty in Pink. Detox, Jinkx Monsoon and Roxxxy Andrews receive positive critiques, with Detox winning the challenge. Alaska, Coco Montrese, Monica Beverly Hillz and Vivienne Pinay receive negative critiques, with Alaska and Vivienne Pinay being safe. Coco Montrese and Monica Beverly Hillz lip-sync to "When I Grow Up" by The Pussycat Dolls. Coco Montrese wins the lip-sync and Monica Beverly Hillz sashays away.: Guest Judges: Coco Austin and Paulina Porizkova; Mini-Challenge: Create a mannequin doll in pairs for "America's Junior Drag Superstar" pageant; Mini-Challenge Winners: Alaska and Lineysha Sparx; Main Challenge: In teams, star in two different children's TV shows; Runway Theme: Pretty in Pink; Challenge Winner: Detox; Challenge Prize: A wig wardrobe from New Attitude Wigs; Bottom Two: Coco Montrese and Monica Beverly Hillz; Lip-Sync Song: "When I Grow Up" by The Pussycat Dolls; Eliminated: Monica Beverly Hillz; Farewell Message: "Love all of u guys, And never be a victim -❤️- Monica Beverly Hillz"
55	4	"Black Swan: Why It Gotta Be Black?"	February 18, 2013
For this week's mini-challenge, the queens do a Soul Train dance-off. Coco Montrese and Jinkx Monsoon win the mini-challenge. For the main challenge, the queens team up and perform in different acts of a ballet about RuPaul's life, entitled "No RuPaulogies".: Team Jinkx Monsoon (Act 1): Alaska, Ivy Winters, Jade Jolie, Jinkx Monsoon and Lineysha Sparx; Team Coco Montrese (Act 2): Alyssa Edwards, Coco Montrese, Detox, Honey Mahogany, Roxxxy Andrews and Vivienne Pinay; On the runway, category is Divalicious. Alyssa Edwards, Ivy Winters and Jinkx Monsoon receive positive critiques, with Alyssa Edwards winning the challenge. Honey Mahogany, Roxxxy Andrews and Vivienne Pinay receive negative critiques, with Roxxxy Andrews being safe. After an underwhelming lip-sync to "Oops!... I Did It Again" by Britney Spears, RuPaul eliminates both Honey Mahogany and Vivienne Pinay from the competition.: Guest Judges: Chaz Bono and Travis Wall; Mini-Challenge: Soul Train dance-off; Mini-Challenge Winners: Coco Montrese and Jinkx Monsoon; Main Challenge: In teams, perform different ballet acts about RuPaul's life; Runway Theme: Divalicious; Challenge Winner: Alyssa Edwards; Challenge Prize: A custom feather headpiece from Mother Plucker; Bottom Two: Honey Mahogany and Vivienne Pinay; Lip-Sync Song: "Oops!... I Did It Again" by Britney Spears; Eliminated: Honey Mahogany and Vivienne Pinay; Honey Mahogany's Farewell Message: "Keep on loving each other, we will meet again, I can't wait. All my l❤️ve, Honey Mahogany"; Vivienne Pinay's Farewell Message: "I love all my girls! Here's to the revolution of the FISH! ❤️ Always, Vivienne Pinay"
56	5	"Snatch Game"	February 25, 2013
For this week's mini-challenge, the queens style a cuddler into a red carpet ready look for an Us Weekly fashion face-off. Alyssa Edwards, Detox and Roxxxy Andrews win the mini-challenge. For the main challenge, the queens play the Snatch Game. Julie Brown and Downtown Julie Brown star as the celebrity contestants. The cast consisted of: Alaska as Lady Bunny; Alyssa Edwards as Katy Perry; Coco Montrese as Janet Jackson; Detox as Kesha; Ivy Winters as Marilyn Monroe; Jade Jolie as Taylor Swift; Jinkx Monsoon as Little Edie; Lineysha Sparx as Celia Cruz; Roxxxy Andrews as Tamar Braxton; On the runway, category is Deadliest Snatch Glamour. Alaska, Jinkx Monsoon and Roxxxy Andrews receive positive critiques, with Jinkx Monsoon winning the challenge. Detox, Ivy Winters and Lineysha Sparx receive negative critiques, with Ivy Winters being safe. Detox and Lineysha Sparx lip-sync to "Take Me Home" by Cher. Detox wins the lip-sync and Lineysha Sparx sashays away.: Guest Judges: Julie Brown and Downtown Julie Brown; Mini-Challenge: Style a cuddler into a red carpet ready look for an Us Weekly fashion face-off; Mini-Challenge Winners: Alyssa Edwards, Detox, Roxxxy Andrews; Main Challenge: Snatch Game; Runway Theme: Deadliest Snatch Glamour; Challenge Winner: Jinkx Monsoon; Challenge Prize: A custom jewel package from Fierce Drag Jewels; Bottom Two: Detox and Lineysha Sparx; Lip-Sync Song: "Take Me Home" by Cher; Eliminated: Lineysha Sparx; Farewell Message: "Latino shade. It was a pleasure to meet you girls, Thanks for your friendship. XOXO Kiss and hugs! Lineysha Sparx"
57	6	"Can I Get an Amen?"	March 4, 2013
For this week's mini-challenge, the queens apply drag makeup in the dark. Detox wins the mini-challenge. For the main challenge, the queens record a "We Are the World"-inspired anthem, "Can I Get An Amen?".: Verse 1: Alyssa Edwards and Coco Montrese; Verse 2: Ivy Winters, Jade Jolie and Jinkx Monsoon; Bridge: Alaska, Detox and Roxxxy Andrews; On the runway, category is My Favorite Body Part. Ivy Winters, Jinkx Monsoon and Roxxxy Andrews receive positive critiques, with Ivy Winters winning the challenge. Alyssa Edwards, Coco Montrese and Jade Jolie receive negative critiques, with Alyssa Edwards being safe. Coco Montrese and Jade Jolie lip-sync to "I'm So Excited" by The Pointer Sisters. Coco Montrese wins the lip-sync and Jade Jolie sashays away.: Guest Judges: La Toya Jackson and The Pointer Sisters (Anita and Ruth); Mini-Challenge: Apply drag makeup in the dark; Mini-Challenge Winner: Detox; Main Challenge: Record a "We Are the World"-inspired anthem, "Can I Get An Amen?"; Runway Theme: My Favorite Body Part; Challenge Winner: Ivy Winters; Challenge Prize: A Flight 001 luggage package; Bottom Two: Coco Montrese and Jade Jolie; Lip-Sync Song: "I'm So Excited" by The Pointer Sisters; Eliminated: Jade Jolie; Farewell Message: "Cheers to my fish, fabulous and fierce sisters. I ❤️ you all, Jade J."
58	7	"RuPaul Roast"	March 11, 2013
For this week's mini-challenge, the queens read each other to filth. Alaska wins the mini-challenge. For the main challenge, the queens perform a roast of RuPaul, the judges, and the fellow queens in front of a live audience. On the runway, Alaska, Coco Montrese and Jinkx Monsoon receive positive critiques, with Coco Montrese winning the challenge. Alyssa Edwards, Ivy Winters and Roxxxy Andrews receive negative critiques, with Ivy Winters being safe. Alyssa Edwards and Roxxxy Andrews lip-sync to "Whip My Hair" by Willow Smith. They are both declared the winners of the lip-sync and no one goes home.: Guest Judges: Leslie Jordan and Jeffrey Moran; Mini-Challenge: Reading is Fundamental; Mini-Challenge Winner: Alaska; Main Challenge: Perform a roast of RuPaul, the judges, and the fellow queens in front of a live audience; Challenge Winner: Coco Montrese; Challenge Prize: A custom gown from Sequin Queen; Bottom Two: Alyssa Edwards and Roxxxy Andrews; Lip-Sync Song: "Whip My Hair" by Willow Smith; Eliminated: None
59	8	"Scent of a Drag Queen"	March 18, 2013
For the mini-challenge, the queens have to match the pit crew wearing the same pairs of underwear. Ivy Winters wins the mini-challenge. For the main challenge, the queens create, market and film a commercial for a signature fragrance.: Alaska - Red for Filth; Alyssa Edwards - Alyssa's Secret; Coco Montrese - Ru Animale by Coco; Detox - Heroine; Ivy Winters - Dress Code; Jinkx Monsoon - Delusion; Roxxxy Andrews - Thick and Juicy; On the runway, Alaska, Detox and Jinkx Monsoon receive positive critiques, with Alaska winning the challenge. Alyssa Edwards, Ivy Winters and Roxxxy Andrews receive negative critiques, with Roxxxy Andrews being safe. Alyssa Edwards and Ivy Winters lip-sync to "Ain't Nothin' Goin' on But the Rent" by Gwen Guthrie. Alyssa Edwards wins the lip-sync and Ivy Winters sashays away.: Guest Judges: Aubrey O'Day and Joan Van Ark; Mini-Challenge: Match the pit crew wearing the same pairs of underwear; Mini-Challenge Winner: Ivy Winters; Main Challenge: Create, market, and film a commercial for a signature fragrance; Challenge Winner: Alaska; Challenge Prize: A selection of handmade corsets from Corset Connection; Bottom Two: Alyssa Edwards and Ivy Winters; Lip-Sync Song: "Ain't Nothin' Goin' on But the Rent" by Gwen Guthrie; Eliminated: Ivy Winters; Farewell Message: "Love you girls so much!! You always have a friend in me! XOXO Ivy"
60	9	"Drama Queens"	April 1, 2013
For the mini-challenge, the queens have to create a fake "sob story" and produce real tears for RuPaul. Alyssa Edwards and Detox win the mini-challenge. For the main challenge, the queens star in a faux Latin telenovela.: Team Casa de Locas (Crazy House): Alyssa Edwards, Coco Montrese and Jinkx Monsoon; Team Ella No Es Dama (She's Not a Lady): Alaska, Detox and Roxxxy Andrews; On the runway, category is Spanish Telenovela Realness. Alaska, Jinkx Monsoon and Roxxxy Andrews receive positive critiques, with Jinkx Monsoon winning the challenge. Alyssa Edwards, Coco Montrese and Detox receive negative critiques, with Detox being safe. Alyssa Edwards and Coco Montrese lip-sync to "Cold Hearted" by Paula Abdul. Coco Montrese wins the lip-sync and Alyssa Edwards sashays away.: Guest Judges: María Conchita Alonso and Jamie-Lynn Sigler; Mini-Challenge: Create a fake "sob story" and produce real tears for RuPaul; Mini-Challenge Winners: Alyssa Edwards and Detox; Main Challenge: Star in a faux Latin telenovela; Runway Theme: Spanish Telenovela Realness; Challenge Winner: Jinkx Monsoon; Challenge Prize: A pair of fur coats from Fabulous-Furs; Bottom Two: Alyssa Edwards and Coco Montrese; Lip-Sync Song: "Cold Hearted" by Paula Abdul; Eliminated: Alyssa Edwards; Farewell Message: "The sky is the limit when your ❤️'s in it. Don't dream it, be it. Always and forever, Alyssa"
61	10	"Super Troopers"	April 8, 2013
For this week's mini-challenge, the queens have to last as long as possible in drag booty camp with a fitness trainer. Alaska wins the mini-challenge. For the main challenge, the queens makeover gay veterans. On the runway, Jinkx Monsoon and Roxxxy Andrews receive positive critiques, with Roxxxy Andrews winning the challenge. Alaska, Coco Montrese and Detox receive negative critiques, with Alaska being safe. Coco Montrese and Detox lip-sync to "(It Takes) Two to Make It Right" by Seduction. Detox wins the lip-sync and Coco Montrese sashays away.: Guest Judges: Clinton Kelly and George Kotsiopoulos; Mini-Challenge: Last as long as possible in drag booty camp with a fitness trainer; Mini-Challenge Winner: Alaska; Main Challenge: Makeover gay veterans; Challenge Winner: Roxxxy Andrews; Challenge Prize: A shopping spree at American Apparel; Bottom Two: Coco Montrese and Detox; Lip-Sync Song: "(It Takes) Two to Make It Right" by Seduction; Eliminated: Coco Montrese; Farewell Message: "I love you all, Give them hell girls. Love, Coco M"
62	11	"Sugar Ball"	April 15, 2013
For this week's mini-challenge, the queens have a bitchfest with puppets. Alaska wins the mini-challenge. For the main challenge, the queens create three looks for the Sugar Ball: Super Duper Sweet 16, Sugar Mama and Candy Couture. On the runway, Alaska and Roxxxy Andrews receive positive critiques, with Alaska winning the challenge. Detox and Jinkx Monsoon receive negative critiques are announced as the bottom two. They lip-sync to "Malambo No. 1" by Yma Sumac. Jinkx Monsoon wins the lip-sync and Detox sashays away.: Guest Judges: Marg Helgenberger and Bob Mackie; Mini-Challenge: Everybody Loves Puppets; Mini-Challenge Winner: Alaska; Main Challenge: The Sugar Ball; Runway Themes: Super Duper Sweet 16, Sugar Mama, and Candy Couture; Challenge Winner: Alaska; Challenge Prize: A private portrait session with Austin Young; Bottom Two: Detox and Jinkx Monsoon; Lip-Sync Song: "Malambo No. 1" by Yma Sumac; Eliminated: Detox; Farewell Message: "Condragulations grillz! Go F****** Kill Them! Rolaskatox 4EVAAAHH! ❤️ Detox"
63	12	"The Final Three, Hunty"	April 22, 2013
For the final challenge of the season, the queens star in RuPaul's music video "The Beginning" and shoot a courtroom scene. On the runway, category is Best Drag. Alaska, Jinkx Monsoon and Roxxxy Andrews lip-sync to "The Beginning" by RuPaul. They are told that the winner will be announced at the live finale.: Special Guests: Gloria Allred, Candis Cayne and Mathu Andersen; Main Challenge: Star in RuPaul's music video "The Beginning" and shoot a courtroom scene; Runway Theme: Best Drag; Lip-Sync Song: "The Beginning" by RuPaul; Eliminated: None
64	13	"Countdown to the Crown"	April 29, 2013
A look back on the highlights, low-lights, and previously unseen footage from the season as we race toward the climactic crowning of America's Next Drag Superstar. With guest appearances by Latrice Royale, Willam, and Sharon Needles.
65	14	"Reunited"	May 6, 2013
All the queens return for the live grand finale. It is revealed that Ivy Winters is this season's Miss Congeniality. It is then announced that Jinkx Monsoon is the winner, leaving Alaska and Roxxxy Andrews as the runners-up.: Finals venue: El Portal Theater, Los Angeles, California; Miss Congeniality: Ivy Winters; Runners-up: Alaska and Roxxxy Andrews; Winner of RuPaul's Drag Race Season Five: Jinkx Monsoon

== Reception ==
The overnight ratings for the fifth-season premiere of Rupaul's Drag Race reinforced the show's position as Logo's juggernaut. "Monday night's 9PM season five premiere of RuPaul's Drag Race worked the ratings runway, averaging a .8 rating in the P18-49 demo. This number represents a 33% increase over Logo's previous top-rated season premiere (fourth-season premiere of RuPaul's Drag Race) and clocks in as the highest-rated season premiere in Logo history.

Additionally, the 90-minute premiere tallied a total of 565,000 viewers. The fifth-season premiere night of RuPaul's Drag Race and companion series RuPaul's Drag Race: Untucked delivered over 1.3 million viewers.

Furthermore, RuPaul's Drag Race: Untucked was the most-watched premiere ever averaging 291,000 total viewers and a .5 rating P18-49. On social media platforms for premiere night, RuPaul's Drag Race and Untucked showed a 136% increase in social activity versus the fourth-season premiere – this includes tweets, Facebook posts and Get Glue check-ins.

== See also ==
- List of Rusicals
