= Black Swan: Why It Gotta Be Black? =

- RuPaul's Drag Race episode
- Episode no.: Season 5 Episode 4
- Presented by: RuPaul
- Original air date: February 18, 2013

Guest appearances
- Chaz Bono (guest judge); Travis Wall (guest judge and choreographer); Nick Lazzarini (guest choreographer); Shawn Morales (Pit Crew)

Episode chronology
← Previous "Draggle Rock"	Next → "Snatch Game"
- RuPaul's Drag Race season 5

"Black Swan: Why It Gotta Be Black?" is the fourth episode of the fifth season of the American television series RuPaul's Drag Race. It originally aired on February 18, 2013. The episode's main challenge tasks the contestants with teaming up and performing in a ballet about RuPaul's life. Chaz Bono and American dancer and choreographer Travis Wall are guest judges. Nick Lazzarini also makes a guest appearance as a guest choreographer. Shawn Morales appears as a member of the Pit Crew.

Alyssa Edwards wins the episode's main challenge. Honey Mahogany and Vivienne Pinay are both eliminated from the competition after placing the bottom and losing a lip-sync contest, marking the show's first double elimination.

== Episode ==
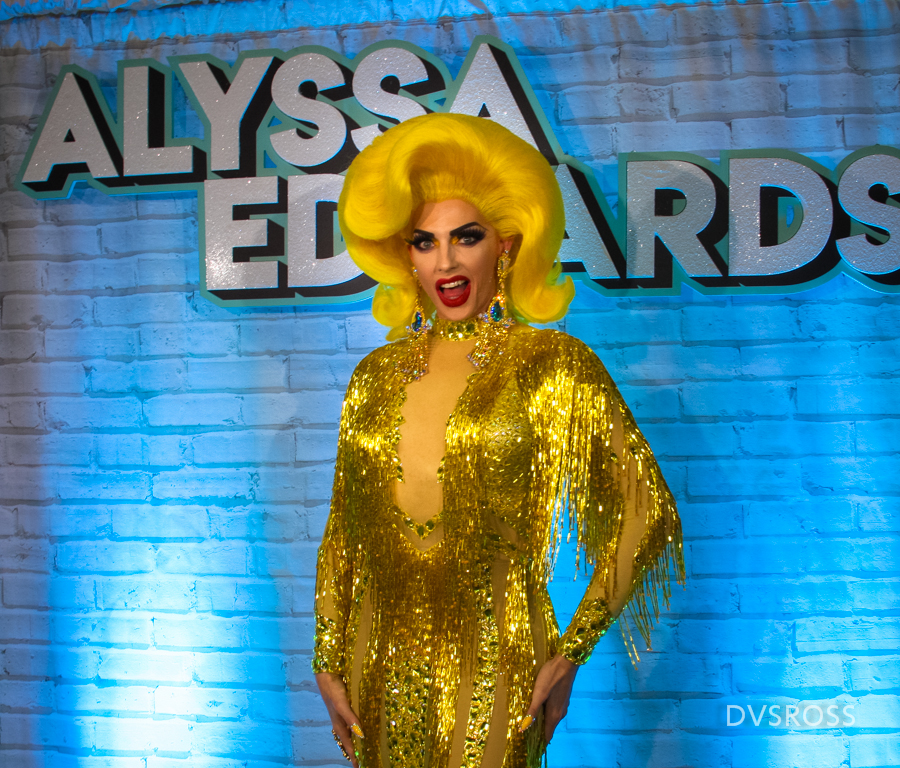
Alyssa Edwards (pictured at RuPaul's DragCon LA in 2018) wins the episode's main challenge.

The contestants return to the workroom after Monica Beverly Hillz's elimination on the previous episode. On a new day, RuPaul greets the group and reveals the mini-challenge, which tasks the contestants with participating in a Soul Train dance-off. The contestants get into "quick drag" and wear wigs as they show off their dance moves. Coco Montrese and Jinkx Monsoon win the mini-challenge. RuPaul reveals the main challenge, which tasks the contestants with teaming up and performing in acts in a ballet about RuPaul's life called No RuPaulogies. As the winners of the mini-challenge, Coco Montrese and Jinkx Monsoon are captains and get to select their teammates. Coco Montrese chooses Alyssa Edwards, Detox, Honey Mahogany, Roxxxy Andrews, and Vivienne Pinay. Jinkx Monsoon's team has Alaska, Ivy Winters, Jade Jolie, Jinkx Monsoon, and Lineysha Sparx.

The teams review the scripts and decide on roles. RuPaul returns to the workroom to meet with both groups, asking questions and offering advice. Before leaving, RuPaul reveals that Chaz Bono is a guest judge. The teams then rehearse choreography with dancers Travis Wall and Nick Lazzarini on the main stage. On elimination day, the contestants make final preparations in the workroom for the ballet and fashion show. Honey Mahogany talks about being sent to Africa after her parents saw a photograph of her in drag. Alyssa Edwards describes how she was inspired to become a choreographer. There is friction between Coco Montrese and Jade Jolie.

On the main stage, RuPaul welcomes fellow judges Michelle Visage and Santino Rice, as well as guest judges Bono and Wall. RuPaul shares the main challenge assignment, then the ballet commences. The contestants present their looks for the fashion show. The judges deliver their critiques and RuPaul asks the contestants to say who they think should be eliminated from the competition. The judges deliberate, then share the results with the group. Alyssa Edwards, Ivy Winters, and Jinkx Monsoon receive positive critiques, and Alyssa Edwards wins the challenge. Honey Mahogany, Roxxxy Andrews, and Vivienne Pinay receive negative critiques, and Roxxxy Andrews is deemed safe. Honey Mahogany and Vivienne Pinay place in the bottom and face off in a lip-sync contest to "Oops!... I Did It Again" (2000) by Britney Spears. After an underwhelming lip-sync, RuPaul eliminates both contestants from the competition.

== Production and broadcast ==
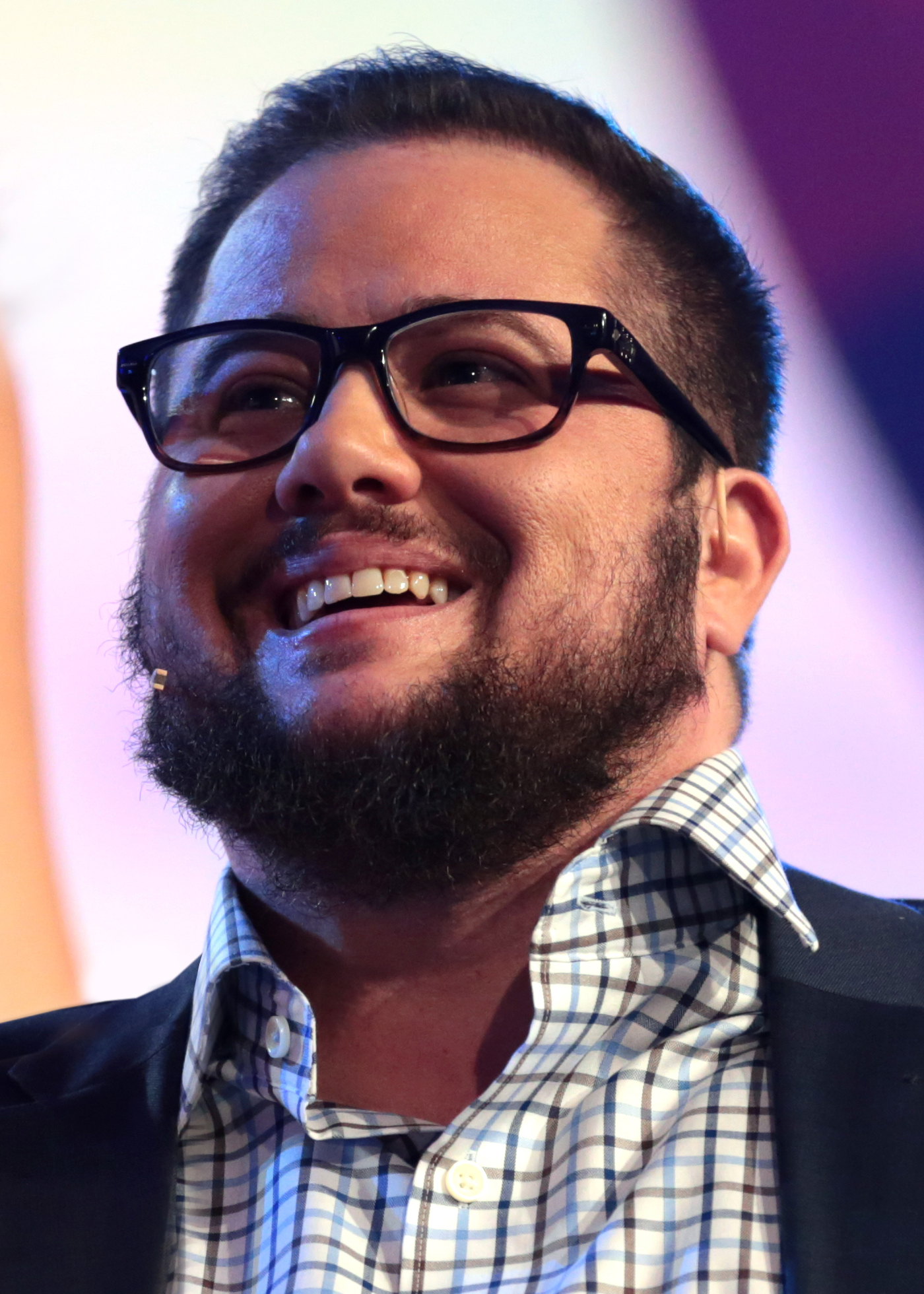
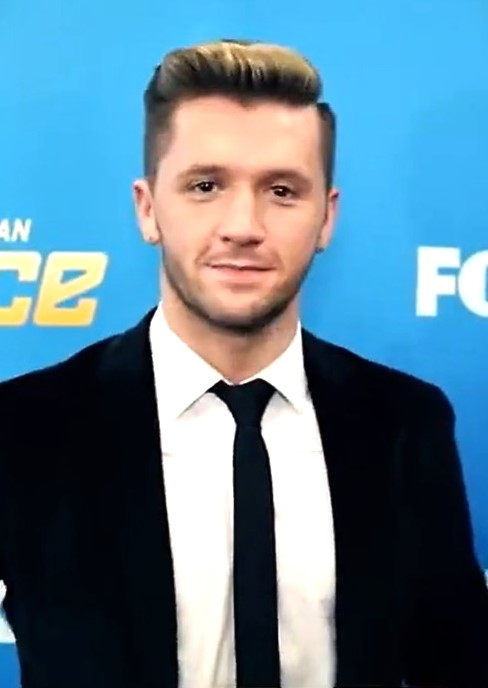
Chaz Bono (top) and Travis Wall (bottom) are guest judges.

The episode originally aired on February 18, 2013. It included the show's first double elimination.

For the ballet, Honey Mahogany and Ivy Winters portray Diana Ross and Lady Bunny, respectively.

Shawn Morales is among members of the Pit Crew in the episode.

=== Fashion ===
For the mini-challenge, RuPaul has a suit and tie, as well as an afro. RuPaul wears and black-and-red dress and a large blonde wig for the main stage. For the fashion show, Alaska wears a dress with an animal print and a blonde wig. Alyssa Edwards has large gold earrings a small hat. Detox wears a blue dress and a blonde wig. Ivy Winters has a black dress with a headpiece. Jinkx Monsoon wears an eyepatch and a blonde wig. Honey Mahogany has a red dress and a large blonde wig. Roxxxy Andrews wears a colorful dress. Vivian Pinay has a black outfit, large earrings, and a red wig.

== Reception ==
Caroline Framke of The A.V. Club gave the episode of rating of 'B'. Melissa Fossum included the main challenge in Phoenix New Times's 2013 list of ten "favorite moments" from the show's fifth season. Scott McMullon included the double elimination in Vada Magazine's 2014 list of the show's top ten "omg moments". Sam Brooks ranked the "Oops!... I Did It Again" performance number 161 in The Spinoff's 2019 "definitive ranking" of the show's 162 lip-sync contests to date and said "both queens were sent home, for sleepwalking onstage". Andy Swift included the lip-sync in TVLine's 2020 list of the show's "most shocking" eliminations. Swift said the performance "was abysmal, but we never expected them both to get the chop. A double elimination was unprecedented back in Season 5, and it remains a rarity to this day, occurring only once more in Season 8."

Bernardo Sim included the double elimination in Screen Rant's 2018 list of 15 contestants "eliminated for crazy reasons", writing: "To be fair, the two queens did a very poor job at lip-synching to such an iconic song, and it would've been a stretch to save either of them for outperforming the other contestant." Sim said the double elimination "set a precedent that was not regularly explored on the RuPaul’s Drag Race franchise". Mariana Fernandes included the performance in the website's 2020 list of the show's ten worst lip-syncs, opining: "both queens seemed like they were just woken up from a long nap and were not happy about it. Terrible from every possible angle".

== See also ==
- Dance on television
- History of ballet
