= RuPaul Roast (RuPaul's Drag Race season 5) =

- RuPaul's Drag Race episode
- Episode no.: Season 5 Episode 7
- Presented by: RuPaul
- Original air date: March 11, 2013

Guest appearances
- Leslie Jordan (guest judge); Jeffrey Moran (guest judge); Nadya Ginsburg; Deven Green; Bruce Vilanch

Episode chronology
← Previous "Can I Get an Amen"	Next → "Scent of a Drag Queen"
- RuPaul's Drag Race season 5

"RuPaul Roast" is the seventh episode of the fifth season of the American television series RuPaul's Drag Race. It originally aired on March 11, 2013. The episode's main challenge tasks the contestants with performing stand-up comedy in a roast of RuPaul before a live audience. Leslie Jordan and Jeffrey Moran of Absolut Vodka are guest judges. Coco Montrese wins the main challenge. Alyssa Edwards and Roxxxy Andrews place in the bottom, but neither contestants is eliminated from the competition after both are declared winners of the lip-sync to "Whip My Hair" by Willow Smith.

== Episode ==
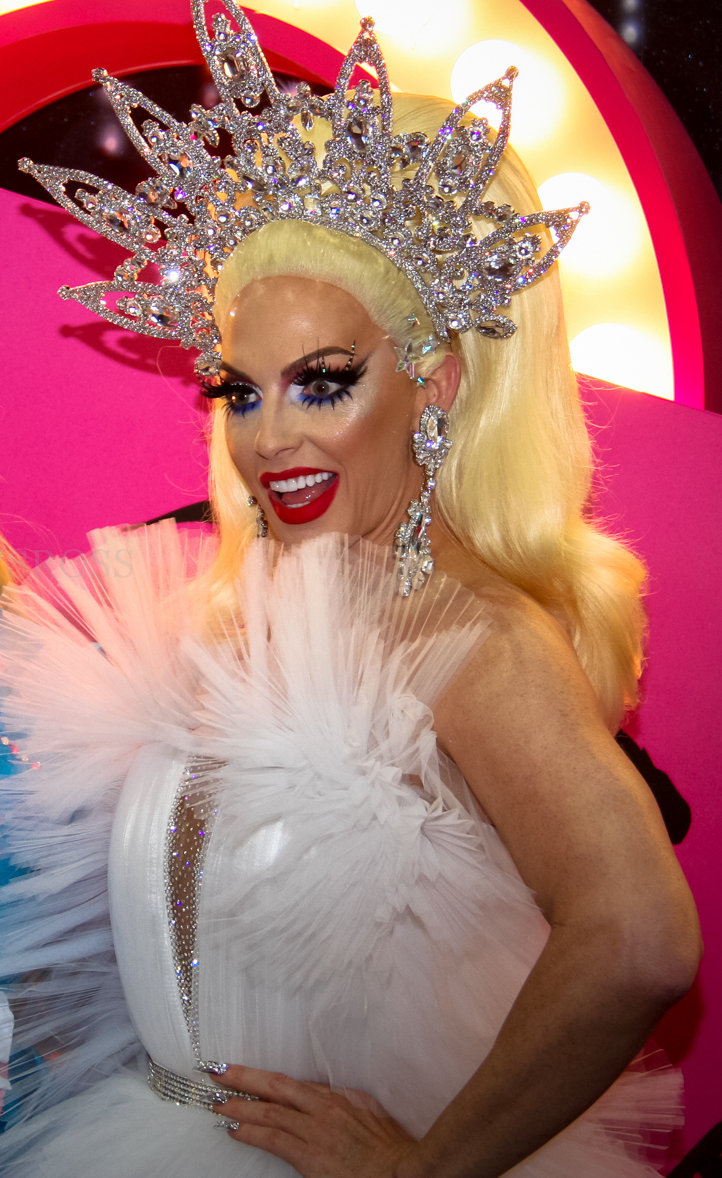
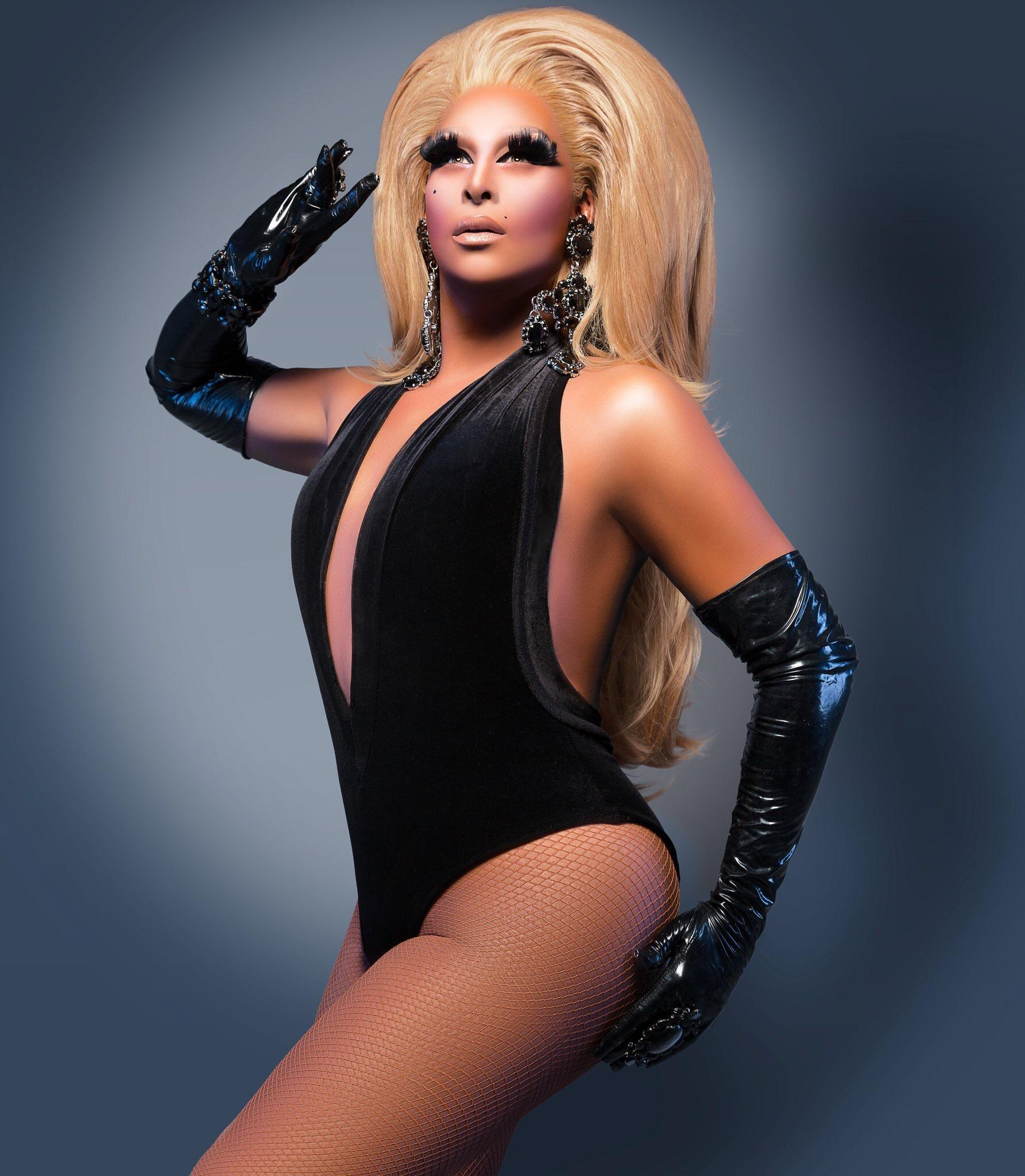
Alyssa Edwards (left) and Roxxxy Andrews (right) place in the bottom but neither are eliminated from the competition.

The contestants return to the workroom after Jade Jolie's elimination on the previous episode. On a new day, RuPaul greets the group and reveals the mini-challenge, which tasks the contestants with "reading" (or playfully insulting) each other. Alaska wins the mini-challenge.

RuPaul then reveals the main challenge, which tasks the contestants with performing stand-up comedy in a roast of RuPaul, the judges, and each other. Before leaving, RuPaul shares that the contestants will be working with Nadya Ginsburg, Deven Green, and Bruce Vilanch. As the winner of the mini-challenge, Alaska gets to decide the performance order. The contestants share their preferred positions, then begin to write their scripts. Michelle Visage visits the workroom to meet with each contestant, asking questions and offering advice. Before leaving, Visage shares that Leslie Jordan and Jeffrey Moran of Absolut Vodka are guest judges, and that the contestants will be performing in front of a live audience. The contestants then rehearse with Ginsburg, Green, and Vilanch.

On elimination day, the contestants make final preparations for the comedy and show. On the main stage, RuPaul welcomes fellow judges Visage and Santino Rice, as well as guest judges Jordan and Moran. RuPaul shares the assignment of the main challenge, then the comedy show commences. The judges deliver their critiques, deliberate, then share the results with the contestants. Coco Montrese wins the challenge. Alyssa Edwards and Roxxxy Andrews place in the bottom and face off in a lip-sync contest to "Whip My Hair" (2010) by Willow Smith. Both are declared winners of the lip-sync and no one is eliminated from the competition.

== Production and broadcast ==
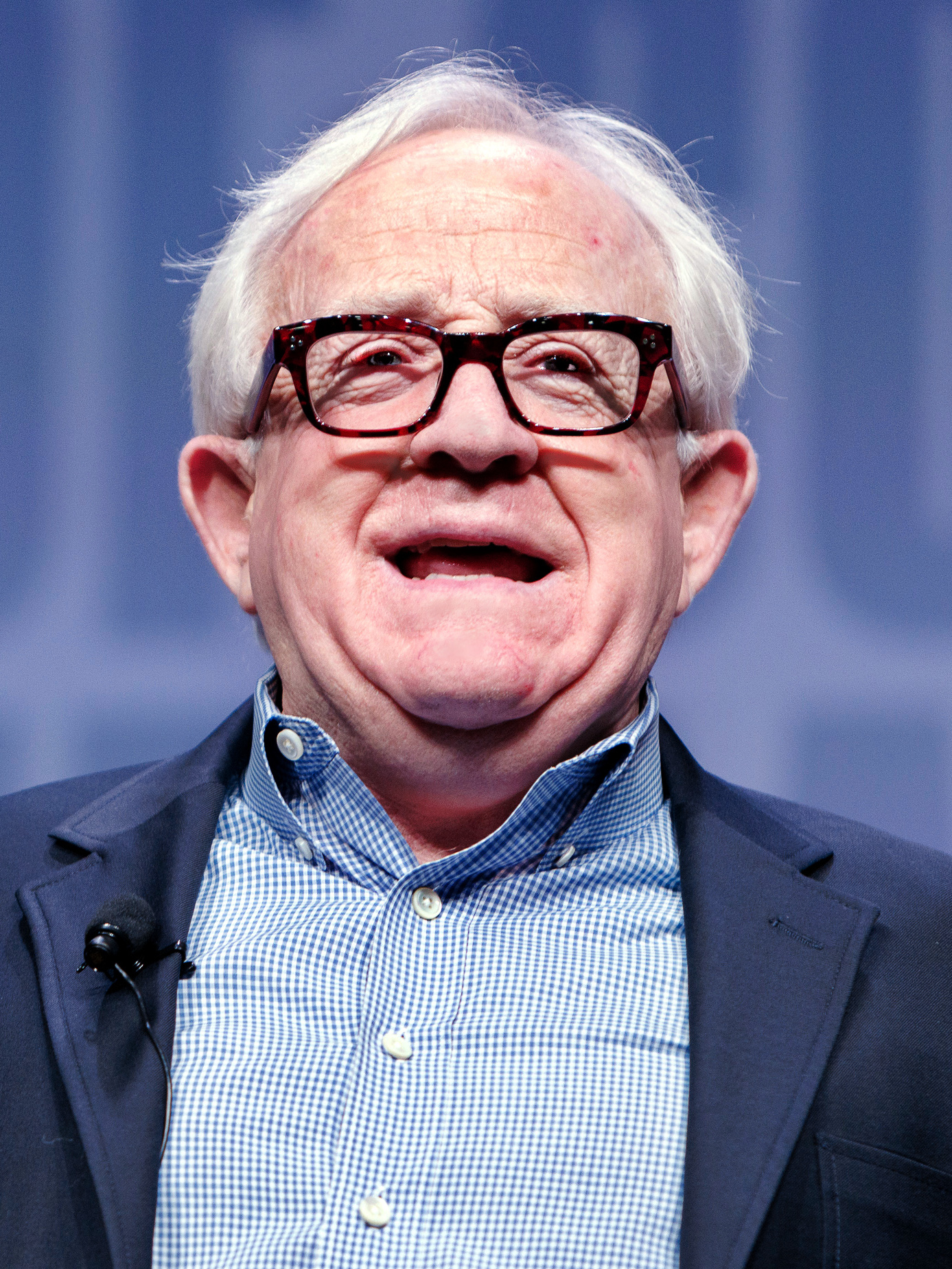
Leslie Jordan (pictured in 2022) is a guest judge.

The episode originally aired on March 11, 2013.

For the main challenge, Coco Montrese portrays a fictional character who is RuPaul's cousin. During the lip-sync contest, Roxxxy Andrews does a wig reveal. After the lip-sync, Roxxxy Andrews talks about being left at a bus stop as a child.

=== Fashion ===
For the main stage, RuPaul wears a green dress, large hoop earrings, and a blonde wig. Alaska has a black dress with a matching headpiece and a blonde wig. Ivy Winters wears a green dress, gloves, and a red wig. Jinkx Monsoon has a black-and-white outfit with a red wig. Detox wears earrings shaped like lightning rods and a dark wig. Alyssa Edwards has a black dress, silver earrings, and a dark wig. Coco Montrese wears a black dress, gold accessories, and a red wig. Roxxxy Andrews has a black lace outfit.

== Reception ==
Oliver Sava of The A.V. Club gave the episode a rating of 'A'. Visage considered the performance among her favorites, as of 2022. In 2022, Bernardo Sim of Out magazine called the lip-sync "iconic". Writing for Pride.com in 2023, Sim said the lip-sync was the season's best. Stephen Daw included the performance in Billboard's similar list in 2024.
