= Draggle Rock =

- RuPaul's Drag Race episode
- Episode no.: Season 5 Episode 3
- Presented by: RuPaul
- Original air date: February 11, 2013

Guest appearances
- Coco Austin; Paulina Porizkova

Episode chronology
← Previous "Lip Synch Extravaganza Eleganza"	Next → "Black Swan: Why It Gotta Be Black?"
- RuPaul's Drag Race season 5

"Draggle Rock" is the third episode of the fifth season of the American television series RuPaul's Drag Race. It originally aired on February 11, 2013. The episode's main challenge tasks the contestants with teaming up and starring in children's television shows. Coco Austin and Paulina Porizkova are guest judges.

Detox wins the episode's main challenge. Monica Beverly Hillz is eliminated from the competition after placing in the bottom two and losing a lip-sync contest against Coco Montrese to "When I Grow Up" (2008) by The Pussycat Dolls. The episode's mini-challenge introduces the fictional character Lil' Poundcake.

== Episode ==
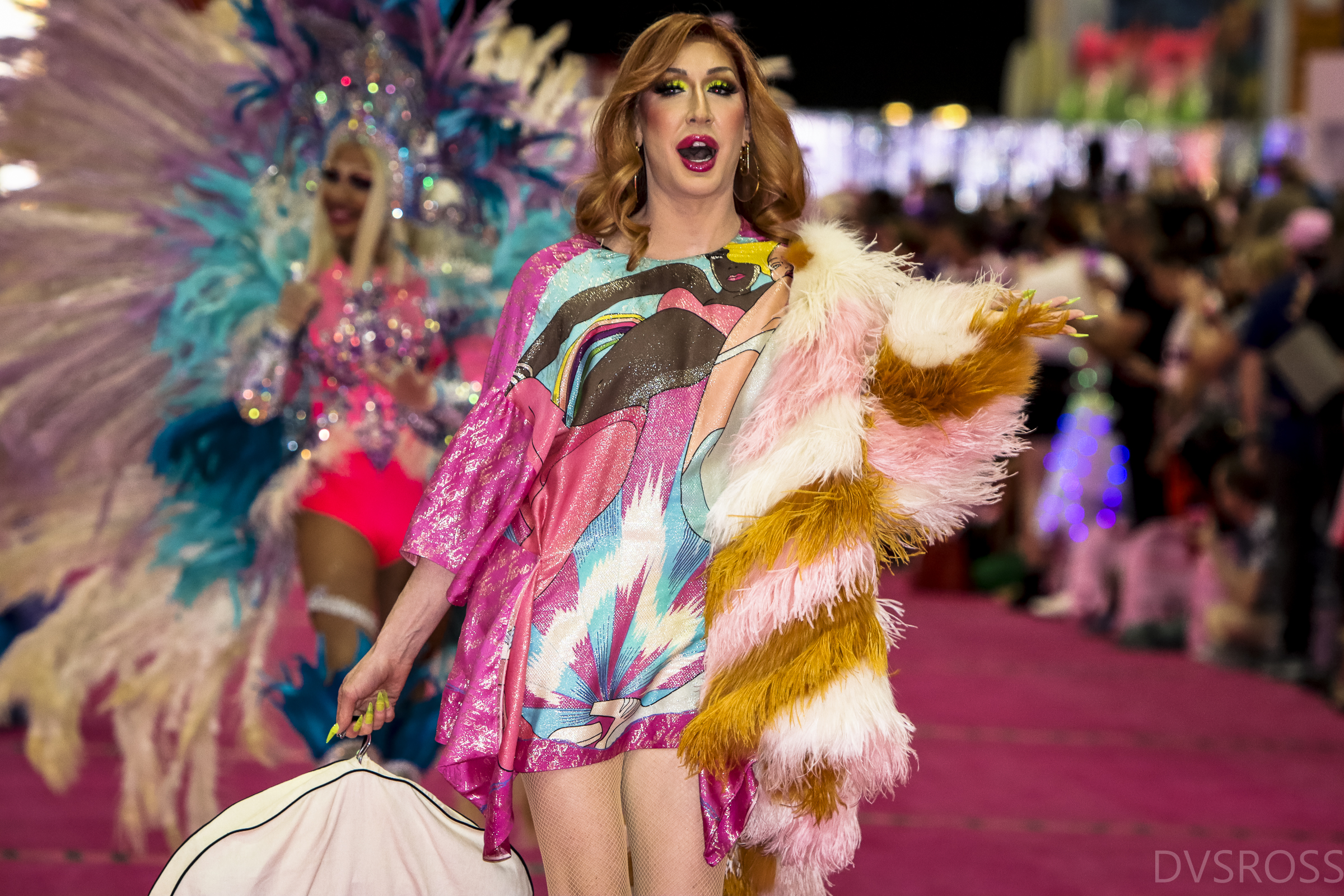
Detox (pictured in 2022) wins the main challenge.

The contestants return to the workroom after Serena ChaCha's elimination on the previous episode. On a new day, RuPaul greets the group and reveals the mini-challenge, which tasks the contestants with pairing up and creating mannequin dolls for the "America's Junior Drag Superstar" pageant. Alaska and Lineysha Sparx win the mini-challenge for their doll Lil' Poundcake. RuPaul then reveals the main challenge, which tasks the contestants with teaming up and starring in two different children's television shows. As the winners of the mini-challenge, Alaska and Lineysha Sparx are captains and get to select their teammates. Alaska chooses Alyssa Edwards, Detox, Monica Beverly Hillz, Roxxxy Andrews, and Vivienne Pinay. Lineysha Sparx's team has Coco Montrese, Honey Mahogany, Ivy Winters, Jade Jolie, and Jinkx Monsoon.

The groups start to develop characters and material. RuPaul returns to the workroom to meet with both groups, asking questions and offering advice. The two groups film with RuPaul and Michelle Visage as directors. On elimination day, the contestants make final preparations in the workroom for the fashion show. Jinkx Monsoon talks about the support she received from her grandmother. Alyssa Edwards and Coco Montrese have a private conversation about the friction in their relationship.

On the main stage, RuPaul welcomes fellow judges Visage and Santino Rice, as well as guest judges Coco Austin and Paulina Porizkova. RuPaul shares the main challenge and fashion show ("pink") assignments, then the contestants present their looks. After watching the two sketches, the judges deliver their critiques, deliberate, then share the results with the group. Detox, Jinkx Monsoon, and Roxxxy Andrews receive positive critiques, and Detox wins the challenge. Alaska, Coco Montrese, Monica Beverly Hillz, and Vivienne Pinay receive negative critiques, and Alaska and Vivienne Pinay are deemed safe. Coco Montrese and Monica Beverly Hillz place in the bottom and face off in a lip-sync contest to "When I Grow Up" (2008) by The Pussycat Dolls. Coco Montrese wins the lip-sync and Monica Beverly Hillz is eliminated from the competition.

== Production and broadcast ==
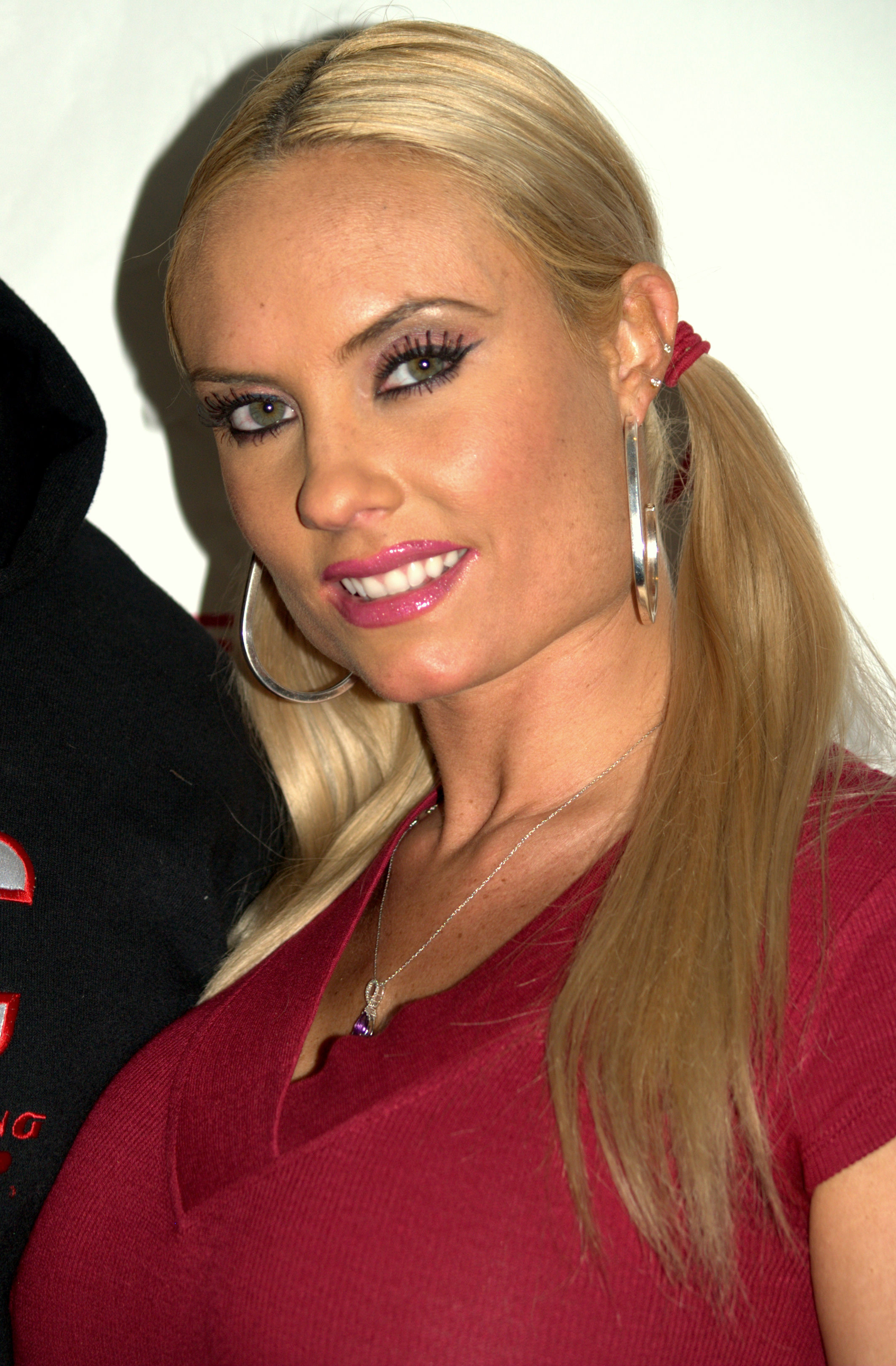
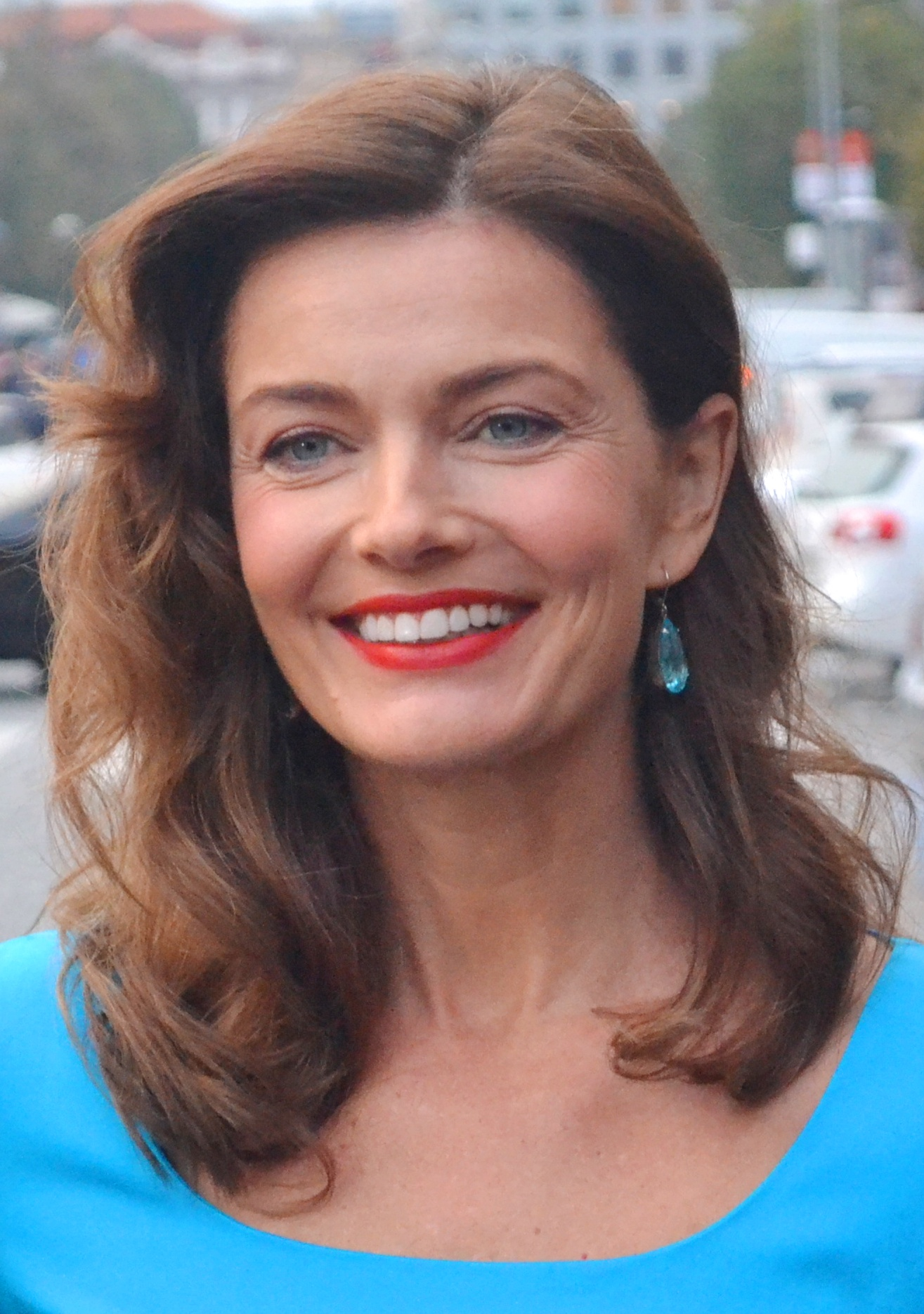
Coco Austin (left) and Paulina Porizkova (right) are guest judges.

The episode originally aired on February 11, 2013.

The two children's television shows have double entendre.

Roxxxy Andrew later recreated Tasha Salad, her character for the children's television show.

=== Fashion ===
For the main stage, RuPaul wears a neon green dress and a blonde wig. For the fashion show, the contestants present outfits with pink. Alaska has a pink-and-white dress with a pink wig. She carries a fake gun. Monica Beverly Hillz has floral accents on her dress. Alyssa Edwards wears a pink bow in her hair. Vivian Pinay has a light pink dress with a corset. Detox wears a mesh outfit and a blonde wig. Roxxxy Andrews has silver jewelry and a long wig. Lineysha Sparx has a blonde wig. Jinkx Monsoon has a Marie Antoinette-inspired outfit and she carries a hand fan. Coco Montrese has a doll-inspired outfit and she carries a stuffed bear. Ivy Winters wears a showgirl-inspired outfit and a blonde wig. Honey Mahogany has a flowy outfit and a long brown wig. Jade Jolie wears a Barbie-inspired short dress and a long blonde wig.

== Reception ==
Oliver Sava of The A.V. Club gave the episode of rating of 'A-'. Kevin O'Keeffe ranked the "When I Grow Up" performance number 101 in INTO Magazine's 2018 "definitive ranking" of the show's lip-sync contests to date. Writing for Xtra Magazine in 2021, O’Keeffe said Coco Montrese "absolutely slayed" the song. Sam Brooks ranked the performance number 84 in The Spinoff's 2019 "definitive ranking" of the show's 162 lip-syncs. The performance is among contestant Jan's favorites from the show.
