= Can I Get an Amen =

- RuPaul's Drag Race episode
- Episode no.: Season 5 Episode 6
- Presented by: RuPaul
- Original air date: March 4, 2013

Guest appearances
- La Toya Jackson (guest judge); Anita Pointer and Ruth Pointer of The Pointer Sisters (guest judges); Lucian Piane

Episode chronology
← Previous "Snatch Game"	Next → "RuPaul Roast"
- RuPaul's Drag Race season 5

"Can I Get an Amen" is the sixth episode of the fifth season of the American television series RuPaul's Drag Race. It originally aired on March 4, 2013. The episode's main challenge tasks the contestants with recording an inspirational track and music video. La Toya Jackson and The Pointer Sisters (Anita Pointer and Ruth Pointer) are guest judges.

Ivy Winters wins the main challenge. Jade Jolie is eliminated from the competition after placing in the bottom and losing a lip-sync contest against Coco Montrese to "I'm So Excited" by The Pointer Sisters.

== Episode ==
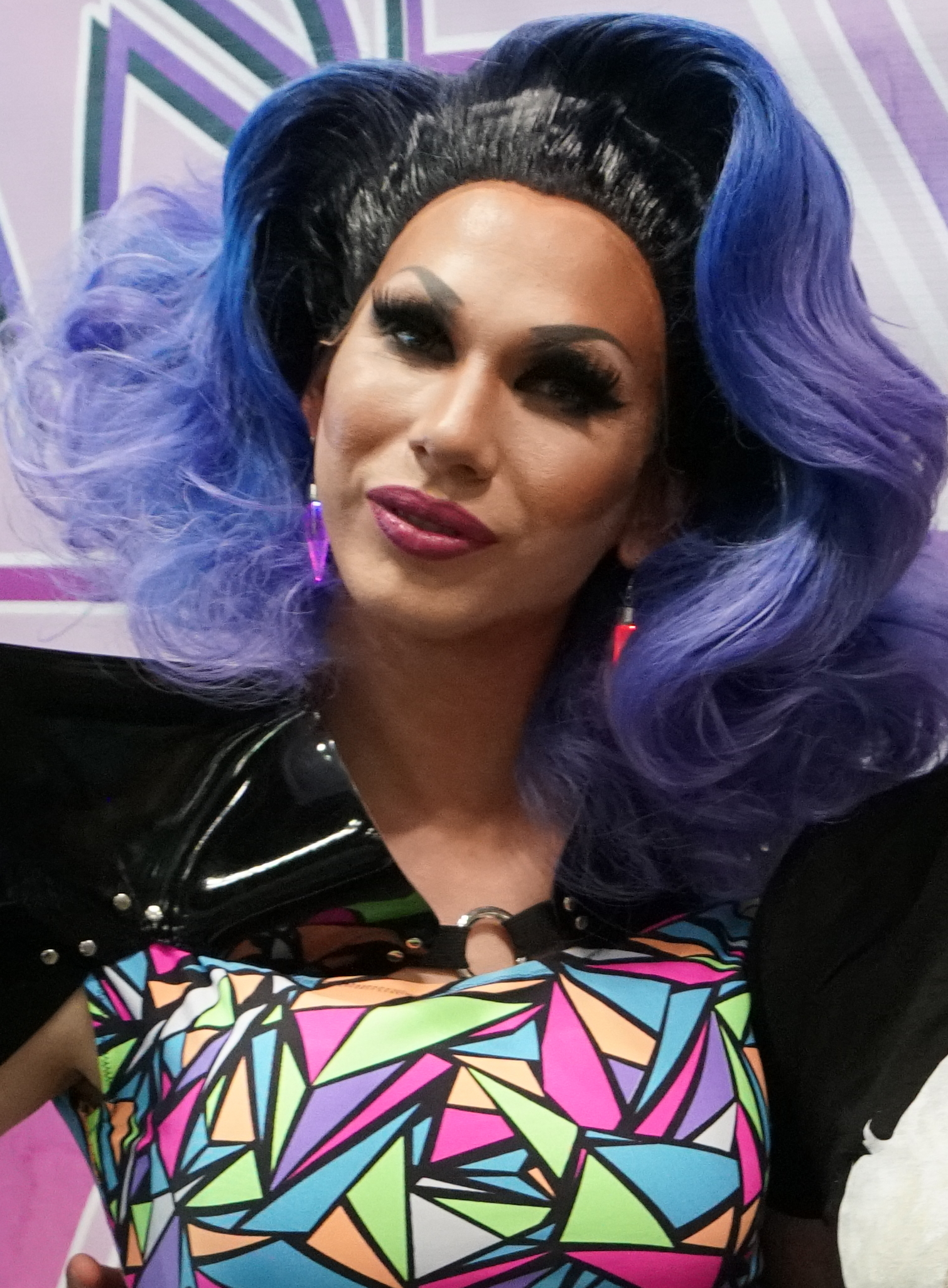
Jade Jolie (pictured in 2017) is eliminated from the competition.

The contestants return to the workroom after Lineysha Sparx's elimination on the previous episode. On a new day, RuPaul greets the group and reveals the mini-challenge, which tasks the contestants with applying cosmetics in the dark. Detox wins the mini-challenge. RuPaul then reveals the main challenge, which tasks the contestants with writing and recording parts for the inspiration anthem "Can I Get An Amen". As the winner of the mini-challenge, Detox gets the choose the teams. Detox selects Alaska and Roxxxy Andrews as her teammates. Alyssa Edwards and Coco Montrese are on one team and Ivy Winters, Jade Jolie, and Jinkx Monsoon are on another. Before leaving, RuPaul reveals that the contestants will be recording the live track and its 1980s-inspired video with Lucian Piane.

Detox announces that her group will be doing the song's bridge. She assigns Alyssa Edwards and Coco Montrese to the first verse and Ivy Winters, Jade Jolie, and Jinkx Monsoon to the second verse. The teams begin to write lyrics. RuPaul returns to the workroom to meet with each group, asking questions and offering advice. Before leaving, RuPaul shares that Anita Pointer and Ruth Pointer of The Pointer Sisters are guest judges. The contestants record the live track and video with Piane. Coco Montrese and Detox get into an argument.

On elimination day, the contestants make final preparations in the workroom for the fashion show. Detox talks about her plastic surgery. Jade Jolie talks about her coming out experience and struggle with self-worth. On the main stage, RuPaul welcomes fellow judges Michelle Visage and Santino Rice, as well as guest judges La Toya Jackson and The Pointer Sisters. RuPaul shares the main challenge assignment and runway category ("Favorite Body Part"), then the fashion show commences. After the contestants present their looks, the judges and contestants watch "Can I Get an Amen".

The judges deliver their critiques, deliberate, then share the results with the contestants. Ivy Winters, Jinkx Monsoon, and Roxxxy Andrews receive positive critiques, and Ivy Winters wins the challenge. Alyssa Edwards, Coco Montrese, and Jade Jolie receive negative critiques, and Alyssa Edwards is deemed safe. Coco Montrese and Jade Jolie place in the bottom and face off in a lip-sync to "I'm So Excited" (1982) by The Pointer Sisters. Coco Montrese wins the lip-sync and Jade Jolie is eliminated from the competition.

== Production and broadcast ==
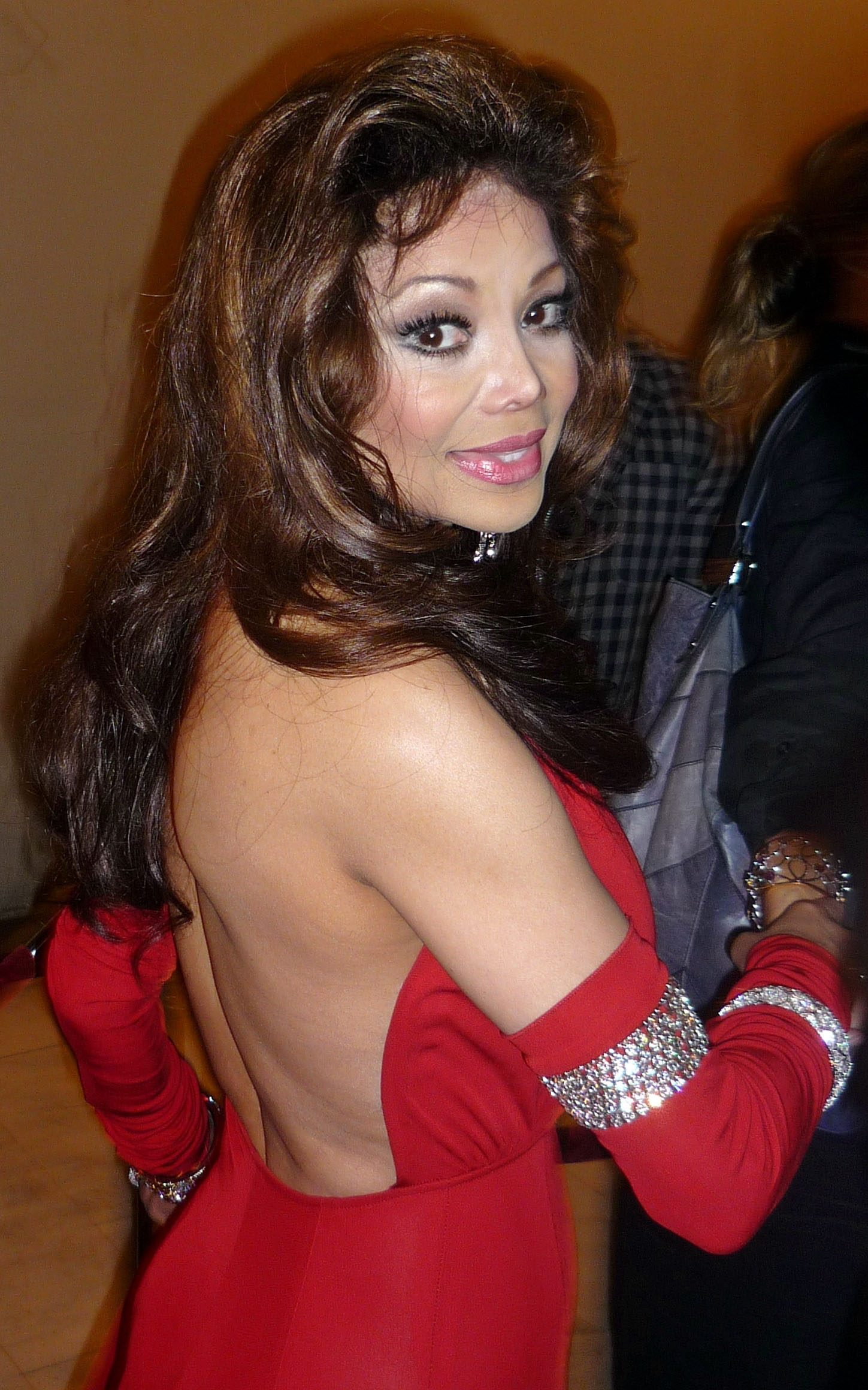
La Toya Jackson is a guest judge.

The episode originally aired on March 4, 2013.

RuPaul is featured at the start of "Can I Get an Amen". Roxxxy Andrews improves the line, "Where my people at?" Proceeds from the song benefitted the Los Angeles LGBT Center.

=== Fashion ===
For the fashion show, the contestants are tasked with highlighting their favorite body part. Coco Montrese's outfit gives the illusion of revealing her inner organs. She has tall black boots and a red wig. Alyssa Edwards highlights her legs and wears a colorful kaftan. Jade Jolie highlights her arms and has a colorful outfit and a long blue wig. Ivy Winters has an outfit made of photographs of her face. She has a blonde wig. Jinkx Monsoon's outfit is black and gold. Roxxxy Andrews removes her cape to show a revealing swimsuit. She wears a large dark wig. Alaska has a light purple dress, large earrings, and a long dark wig. Detox has a black outfit and a long red wig. She turns around to reveal part of her buttocks.

== Reception ==
Oliver Sava of The A.V. Club gave the episode of rating of 'A-'. Lyndsey Parker ranked "Can I Get an Amen" fourth in Yahoo Music's 2015 list of the eight best "We Are the World" parodies. Sarah McKenna Barry included Coco Montrese's line "I lost all hope today" in Gay Community News's 2026 list of 17 "iconic" quotes on the show "that have become staples in our vocabulary", writing:

When the season five queens were challenged to perform a charity single, the audience was gifted so many memorable gems. From Coco’s opening –"I lost all hope today"– to Jinkx's never-ending high note to Roxxxy's rallying "Where my people at?", to Jade clutching her diaphragm throughout, this challenge was the gift that kept on giving. Also, who could forget the debate over sequins/sequenced gowns that preceded it? Truly iconic.

Kevin O'Keeffe ranked the "I'm So Excited" performance number 20 in INTO Magazine's 2018 "definitive ranking" of the show's lip-sync contests to date. Sam Brooks ranked the performance number 70 in The Spinoff's 2019 "definitive ranking" of the show's 162 lip-syncs to date.
