= Lil' Poundcake =

Fictional character

- RuPaul's Drag Race character
- First appearance: "Draggle Rock"; February 11, 2013
- Created by: Alaska Thunderfuck; Lineysha Sparx

In-universe information
- Full name: Gertrude Poundcakenstein
- Gender: Female
- Occupation: Drag performer

Gertrude Poundcakenstein, known professionally as Lil' Poundcake, is a fictional character created by American drag performers Alaska Thunderfuck and Lineysha Sparx. Lil' Poundcake made her first television appearance in the episode "Draggle Rock" on the fifth season (2013) of the American television series RuPaul's Drag Race. The character has made subsequent appearances within the Drag Race franchise, and Alaska has referenced Lil' Poundcake in other works.

== Description and origin ==
Lil' Poundcake is the stage name of the fictional character Gertrude Poundcakenstein. She was described as a "deranged and angry" beauty pageant "competitor from hell" when she was originally created by drag performers Alaska Thunderfuck (or simply Alaska) and Lineysha Sparx during a challenge on the third episode ("Draggle Rock") of the fifth season (2013) of the American television series RuPaul's Drag Race. Xtra Magazine described Lil' Poundcake as a "snide, bratty little child" and noted that Alaska "writes a pitch-perfect story of a precocious young dick-pig who loves riding dirty and regularly screams 'you're not my [dad] and you never will be!'"

Lil' Poundcake wears a pink dress and a has frown painted on her face. According to Screen Rant, Lil' Poundcake is "Alaska's alter ego that has become as loved as the queen, herself. This character costume involves heavy white makeup and dark eye makeup with a bright fuchsia gown ensemble."

== Subsequent appearances and influence ==
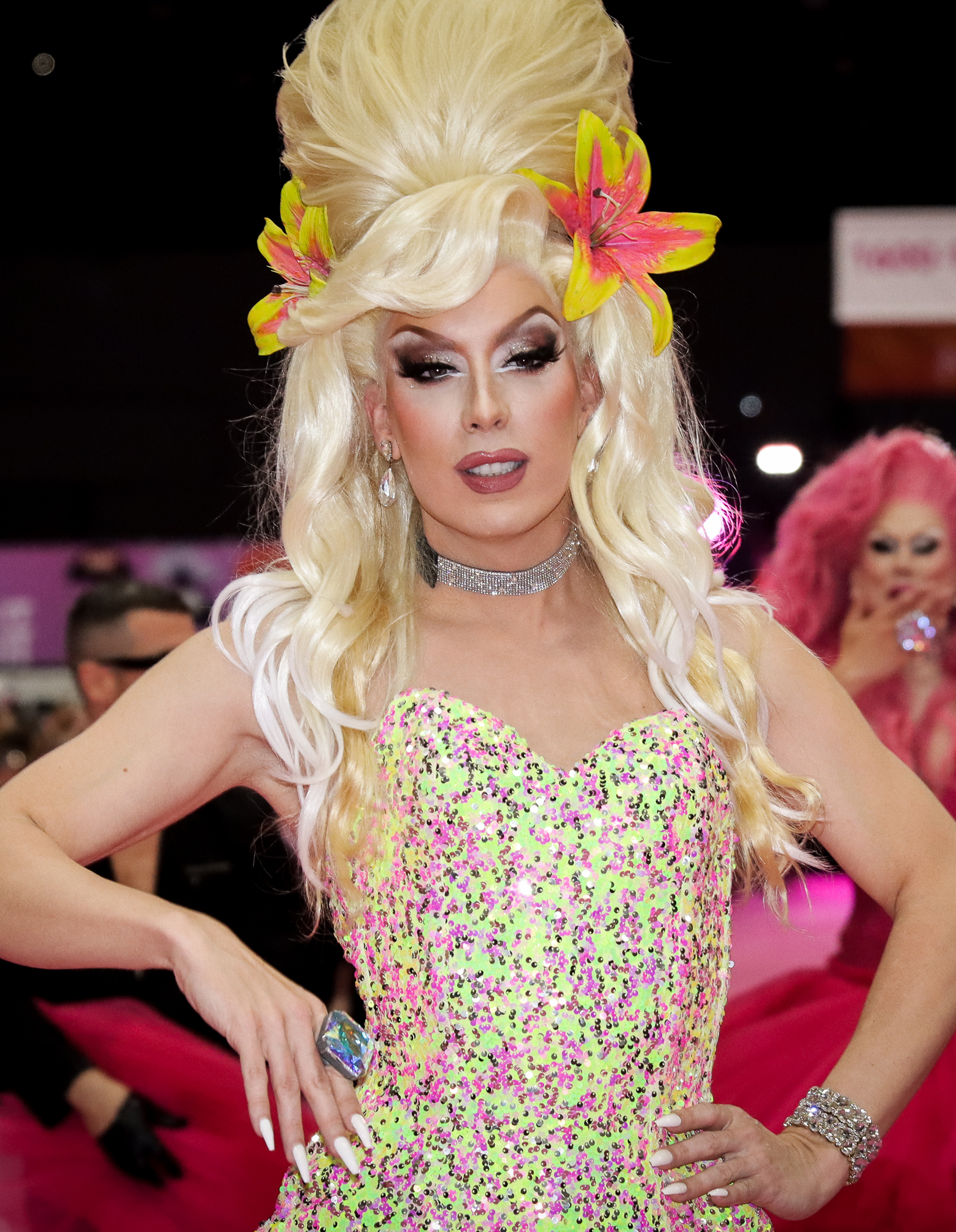
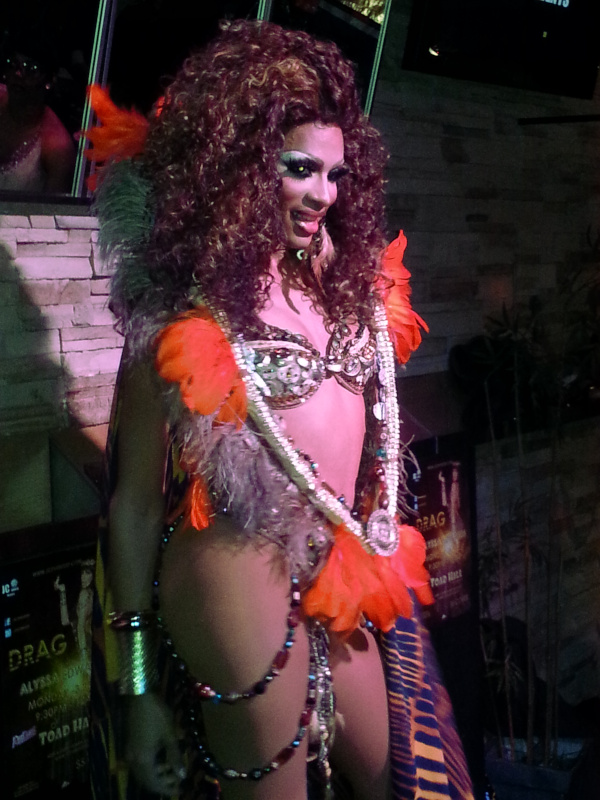
The character Lil' Poundcake was co-created by drag performers Alaska Thunderfuck (left, pictured in 2024) and Lineysha Sparx (right, pictured in 2013)

Lil' Poundcake has been referenced repeatedly in the Drag Race franchise. Alaska dressed as Lil' Poundcake on the second season (2016) of RuPaul's Drag Race All Stars (episode "Drag Movie Shequels"). In the eighth season (2023) of RuPaul's Drag Race All Stars, the contestants appeared in a true crime spoof titled "Forensic Queens: Wha-Ha-Happened to Lil' Poundcake?". The original Lil' Poundcake doll is kept in the Untucked lounge. A large version of Lil' Poundcake appeared in the first episode ("Squirrel Games") of the seventeenth season (2025) of RuPaul's Drag Race in which, during a Squid Game-inspired challenge, Lil' Poundcake throws pies at contestants.

In 2016, Alaska released her second studio album Poundcake. The album's title and the song "Puppet" refer to character. The album was promoted by a music video for the lead single "Puppet". The music video, directed by Santiago Felipe, shows Lil' Poundcake "pulling a Wall Street heist with her cohorts and spitting some hilariously foul lyrics"; according to Billboard magazine's Patrick Crowley, "After losing a beauty pageant of sorts, a crazed Gertrude Poundcakenstein goes on a crime spree. Joined by her sidekicks, Juicy Liu and Chocolate Puddin, she robs a bank and wreaks havoc on Lower Manhattan." Adam Salandra of Logo TV's NewNowNext wrote, "When the puppet with daddy issues loses a beauty pageant to Baby Thunder Thighs in the video, she also loses her mind, transforming into an evil version of Lil' Poundcake before our very eyes. With a freshly painted mug and revenge on her mind, she sets out on a crime spree with tragic results."

Alaska also supported the album with her Poundcake World Tour, a rock music show featuring Jackie Beat as an opening act. Billboard included "Puppet" in a 2019 list of the 20 best songs by Drag Race contestants, stating: "A deliriously upbeat, catchy hook pairs well with the unrepentantly filthy (and hysterical) lyrics on this standout track ... She has a number of excellent songs, but the Lil' Poundcake-inspired 'Puppet' is undeniable."

In 2017, Alaska released a commercial for her Lil' Poundcake plush doll, featuring Drag Race contestants Jiggly Caliente and Raja. Chappell Roan has worn an outfit inspired by Lil' Poundcake.
