= Oops!... I Did It Again (song) =

2000 single by Britney Spears

Single by Britney Spears

from the album Oops!... I Did It Again
- B-side: "Deep in My Heart"
- Released: April 11, 2000
- Recorded: November 1999
- Studio: Cheiron (Stockholm)
- Genre: Dance-pop; teen pop
- Length: 3:31
- Label: Jive
- Composers: Max Martin; Rami Yacoub
- Lyricist: Max Martin
- Producers: Max Martin; Rami Yacoub

Britney Spears singles chronology
"From the Bottom of My Broken Heart" (1999)	"Oops!... I Did It Again" (2000)	"Lucky" (2000)

Music video
- "Oops!...I Did It Again" on YouTube

"Oops!... I Did It Again" is a pop song recorded by American singer Britney Spears from her second studio album of the same name. It was released on April 11, 2000, by Jive Records as the lead single from the album, and her sixth single overall. It was written and produced by Max Martin and Rami Yacoub. Its bridge features spoken dialogue which references the 1997 film Titanic.

Upon its release, "Oops!... I Did It Again" received many positive reviews from music critics and some noted similarities to Spears's debut single "...Baby One More Time". The song was nominated for Best Female Pop Vocal Performance at the 43rd Annual Grammy Awards in 2001. Commercially, it peaked at number nine on the US Billboard Hot 100. It topped the charts in at least 20 countries, including Australia, Denmark, and Spain.

The accompanying music video was directed by Nigel Dick; it depicts Spears dancing on Mars dressed in a red catsuit. With her singing, she addresses an astronaut who has fallen in love with her. It went on to receive three nominations at the 2000 MTV Video Music Awards. Spears has performed the song live on tour, for Oops!... I Did It Again, Dream Within a Dream, and The Onyx Hotel, as well as for her Las Vegas show, Britney: Piece of Me.

== Background and composition ==
"Oops!... I Did It Again"
A 22-second sample of "Oops!... I Did It Again" by Spears, in which she sings about playing with her lover's emotions and claims "I'm not that innocent".

After attaining huge success with her debut album ...Baby One More Time (1999) and its singles "...Baby One More Time", "Sometimes", "(You Drive Me) Crazy", "Born to Make You Happy", and "From the Bottom of My Broken Heart", Spears recorded much of her follow-up record Oops!... I Did It Again (2000) in November 1999 at the Cheiron Studios in Stockholm, Sweden. Its title track was written and produced by Max Martin and Rami Yacoub, while background vocals were provided by Martin and Nana Hedin. The track was released on March 27, 2000, by Jive Records as the lead single from the record.

"Oops!... I Did It Again" lasts for 3 minutes and 31 seconds. It is composed in the key of C♯ minor and is set in time signature of common time, with a moderate tempo of 95 beats per minute. The song has a basic sequence of C♯m–A-G♯ as its chord progression, an example of a folia, and features a vocal range spanning from C♯_{3} to C♯_{5}.

The lyrics to the track discuss a woman who toys with her lover's emotions; the lover mistakes Spears' flirtatiousness for something more, and considers her a serious romantic interest. During its bridge, Spears delivers a spoken-word dialogue that references the blockbuster film Titanic (1997).

== Critical reception ==
Upon its release, "Oops!... I Did It Again" received generally favorable reviews from music critics. Lennat Mak of the Asian division of MTV complimented the song as "a perfect 10 on the "wow" scale, with the wacky "Jack-Rose" dialogue", referencing the Titanic spoken lyrics. Some however, were not as positive; writing for Entertainment Weekly, David Browne called it "ludicrously derivative" of Spears' debut single "...Baby One More Time", and commented that it "amounts to nothing so much as a jailbait manifesto".

A reviewer from NME compared the structure of the recording to '80s-style riffs of Michael Jackson and further described the track as a "harder, carbon copy" of "...Baby One More Time" that is "easily as good as her breakthrough single". Robert Christgau recognized "Oops!... I Did It Again" and Spears' rendition of "(I Can't Get No) Satisfaction" as his "choice cuts" from the parent album. Writing for Rolling Stone, Rob Sheffield compared the track musically to Barbra Streisand's "Woman in Love" and lyrically to The Smiths' "I Started Something I Couldn't Finish", and complimented it for being "terrific" and displaying "a violently ambivalent sexual confusion her audience can relate to". Andy Battaglia of Salon described the track as a "sweetly sadistic companion piece to the masochism lite lurking beneath her debut '...Baby One More Time'".

"Oops!... I Did It Again" was nominated for the Grammy Award for Best Female Pop Vocal Performance at the 2001 ceremony, but lost to "I Try" by Macy Gray. The track was additionally nominated for the Favorite Song at the 2001 Kids' Choice Awards broadcast on Nickelodeon, but lost to "Who Let the Dogs Out?" by the Baha Men.

== Commercial performance ==
In the United States, "Oops!... I Did It Again" peaked at number nine on the Billboard Hot 100. It additionally peaked at numbers one and 27 on the Billboard Mainstream Top 40 and Adult Top 40 component charts. In Canada, the track topped the RPM 100 Hit Tracks chart for six weeks. It topped the singles charts in both Australia and New Zealand, and was certified platinum in the former country for reaching sales of 70,000 copies.

"Oops!... I Did It Again" enjoyed success throughout Europe, and peaked atop the Eurochart Hot 100. It also peaked at number one on the UK Singles Chart selling 124,000 copies in its first week, becoming Spears' third UK number one, and was certified platinum for exceeding sales of 600,000 copies. The single also peaked at number one on The Official UK Airplay Chart. As of August 2022, the song has sold 931,000 copies in the country. The song reached number two in Austria, where it was additionally recognized with platinum certification for sales of 15,000 units. It respectively peaked at numbers one and three on the Wallonia and Flanders charts in Belgium, and also respectively reached numbers one and two in Denmark and Finland.

"Oops!... I Did It Again" reached number four in France, and number two in both Germany and Ireland. In Germany, the single additionally received a gold certification, signifying sales of 250,000 units. It additionally topped singles charts in Italy, the Netherlands, Norway, Spain, Sweden, and Switzerland. The song was awarded gold certifications in the Netherlands and Switzerland, respectively marking sales of 40,000 and 15,000 copies, and attained platinum certification in Sweden for reaching sales of 20,000 units. As of May 2020, the single has generated over 240 million streams in the US.

== Music video ==
=== Background ===
An accompanying music video for "Oops!... I Did It Again" was directed by Nigel Dick and was filmed from March 17–18, 2000 in Universal City, California. It was choreographed by Tina Landon. During its production, Spears was reportedly struck in the head by a falling camera and began bleeding. According to Dick, she was actually struck by the camera's matte box, which fell off the front of the lens. Spears' mother Lynne (who was present) suggested that she might have suffered from a concussion, though she received four stitches and continued work after resting for four hours. Spears created the concept for the clip, commenting that "[she wanted] to be on Mars, dancing on Mars" and "[wanted] to be in a red jumpsuit". The final product premiered on April 10, 2000, on an episode of MTV's Making the Video.

=== Synopsis ===
Spears dances, wearing a red catsuit that covers her whole body. She is surrounded by backup dancers in shiny silver futuristic outfits during the music video.

The music video begins with a brief scene of an astronaut on Mars uncovering a stone slate featuring the cover of the album Oops!... I Did It Again. A scientist back on Earth sees it through a video transmitter and says, "Cute. What is it?" As the astronaut replies, "Oh, it's cute all right. It couldn't be...", the ground begins to shake as a large stage rises from the ground. Spears, with long, straight hair, then descends from a platform onto a stage in a red catsuit as the track begins to play. As she continues to sing and dance, she suspends the astronaut mid-air above her. Interspersed throughout the video are scenes of Spears wearing a midriff-baring white top and skirt, lying barefoot on a white web pad with backup dancers on the ground around her. During its bridge, Spears does a flip in the air to where the astronaut is and appears in a white jacket, short black leather skirt, and leather boots. As a symbol of his love for her, the astronaut gifts Spears with the Heart of the Ocean, the blue diamond from the blockbuster film Titanic. She questions that she "thought the old lady [Rose] dropped it into the ocean in the end", to which he responds, "Well, baby, I went down and got it for you". Spears comments "Aww, you shouldn't have" and walks away, the astronaut shrugs and leaves (this spoken interlude is also heard on the record). The video concludes as Spears and her performers continue to dance.

=== Reception ===
At the 2000 MTV Video Music Awards, the music video for "Oops!... I Did It Again" was nominated for the Best Female Video, Best Dance Video, the Best Pop Video, and the Viewer's Choice. However, she lost in each of the four categories.

== Live performances ==
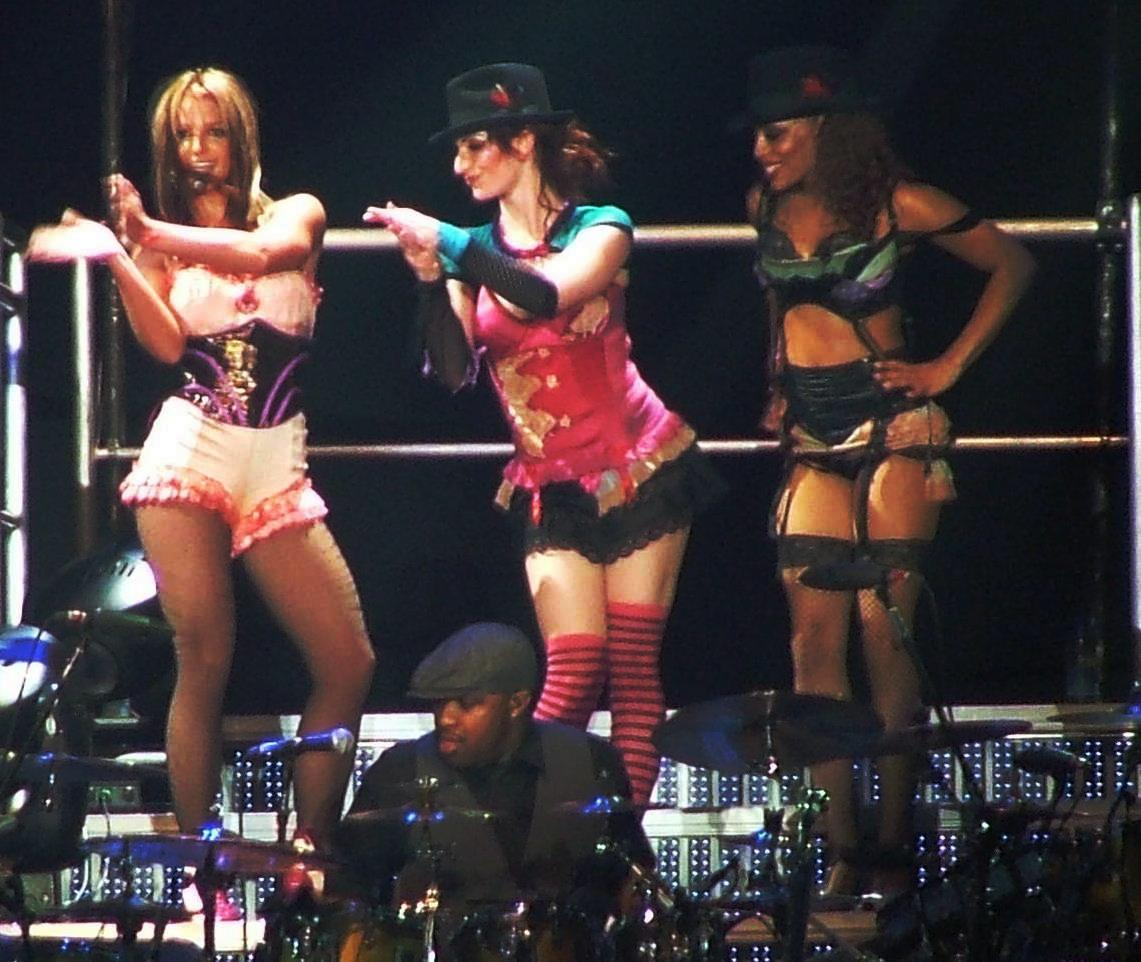
Spears (left) and her dancers during The Onyx Hotel Tour, 2004

The first performance of "Oops!... I Did It Again" was on March 8, 2000, during the Crazy 2k Tour in Pensacola, Florida. In May 2000, Spears performed "Oops!... I Did It Again" during several television performances, including All That, The Rosie O'Donnell Show, Saturday Night Live, The Tonight Show with Jay Leno, Total Request Live, and the two-hour concert special Britney Live. The following month, she appeared in an additional television special, titled Britney Spears in Hawaii. In collaboration with McDonald's, Spears and NSYNC filmed a commercial for the fast-food chain, where they lip-synced to "Oops!... I Did It Again" and "Bye Bye Bye", respectively.

On September 7, Spears performed "Oops!... I Did It Again" and her rendition of "(I Can't Get No) Satisfaction" by The Rolling Stones at the 2000 MTV Video Music Awards, where she notably tore off her black suit to unveil a more provocative, flesh-colored two-piece. Entertainment Weekly included the performance on its end-of-the-decade "best-of" list, describing "the pre-breakdown pop tart, then just 18 years old, writhing and shaking her moneymaker in nude-colored rhinestone spandex" to be "pure kitsch bliss".

Spears has performed "Oops!... I Did It Again" on three of her eight concert tours. She premiered the song on the Crazy 2k Tour and later included the track as the encore to her Oops!... I Did It Again Tour in 2000, where it was performed with special effects involving fire and an extended dance break. In 2001, it was featured as the opening to her Dream Within a Dream Tour. In 2004, Spears sang "Oops!... I Did It Again" during The Onyx Hotel Tour, held in support of her fourth studio album In the Zone. The track was reworked with "...Baby One More Time" as a jazz-style performance.

Spears would not perform the song again for nine years until it was included on the setlist of her Las Vegas residency show Britney: Piece of Me at the Planet Hollywood Resort and Casino.

== Legacy and covers ==
Since its release, "Oops!... I Did It Again" has been covered on numerous occasions. In 2001, German singer Max Raabe recorded a cabaret version of the song with Palast Orchester for their album Super Hits. On 7 May 2005, Kelly Marie appeared on the ITV show and performed Hit Me, Baby, One More Time. Finnish melodic death metal band Children of Bodom also recorded a cover of the song for their album Skeletons in the Closet (2009), while Rochelle released three Eurodance hi-NRG renditions of the track. Richard Thompson covered the song on his album 1000 Years of Popular Music (2006), and in addition included a medieval-style version titled "Marry, Ageyn Hic Hev Donne Yt".

"Oops!... I Did It Again" has been featured on several television series. In 2004, it was included on the soundtrack for the sitcom Will & Grace. Irish pop rap duo Jedward performed the song live during the sixth series of the British version of The X Factor in 2009. During the episode "Britney/Brittany" for Glee in 2010, Brittany Pierce (portrayed by Heather Morris) mimicked Spears as she danced in a red catsuit while performing her later single "I'm a Slave 4 U". The song itself was later performed by Rachel Berry (portrayed by Lea Michele) during the episode "Britney 2.0" in 2012. While on tour with her band the Scene, Selena Gomez covered "Oops!... I Did It Again" during their We Own the Night Tour in 2011. Tori Spelling also covered the song on The Masked Singer.

Cover versions of the song appear on the video games Dance Dance Revolution Extreme 2 (2005), Karaoke Revolution Volume 3 (2004), and Just Dance 4 (2012), while Spears' original version is included on Singstar as DLC and her own video game Britney's Dance Beat. In 2005, the comedy website Super Master Piece released a parody version of "Oops!... I Did It Again" titled "Oops I Did It Again!: The Original", which they jokingly labeled as the original recording by Louis Armstrong in April 1932 in Chicago, Illinois; their version was actually recorded by Shek Baker. The track has also been parodied under the title "Oops! I Farted Again" by producer Bob Rivers.

In 2013, the song appeared as a lip sync song on the fourth episode of the 5th season of RuPaul's Drag Race ("Black Swan: Why It Gotta Be Black?"), where contestants Honey Mahogany and Vivienne Pinay had to perform it to stay in the competition; notoriously, the episode marked the show's first ever double elimination as RuPaul declared neither queen "showed me the fire it takes to stay". That same year, it was reported that "Oops!... I Did It Again" and "...Baby One More Time" has been used by the British Navy to scare off pirates near Somalia. "Oops!... I Did It Again" is referenced in the lyrics of Peeping Tom's 2006 single "Mojo" and Fall Out Boy's 2017 single "Young and Menace".

Anne Marie referenced the song on the chorus of her single "2002". Miley Cyrus' "Mother's Daughter" music video pays homage to the red latex suit Spears wore in the "Oops!... I Did It Again" music video.

In 2015, Postmodern Jukebox covered the song in the jazz style of Marilyn Monroe for their album Swipe Right for Vintage, with Haley Reinhart singing lead. Its music video has amassed more than 36 million views on YouTube as of September 2023.

In the Tesco's British and Irish Christmas adverts for 2020, it uses the song as part of its "No Naughty List" campaign.

In 2024, Sabrina Carpenter used an audio sample in her medley on her night at 2024 MTV Video Music Awards. The song was also covered in 2024 by American actress Ashley Park in Netflix' series Emily in Paris' fourth season.

The trailers and promotional spots for the Universal Pictures/Blumhouse 2025 film M3GAN 2.0 use this song.

== Track listings and formats ==
- European CD single
1. "Oops!... I Did It Again" (album version) – 3:31
2. "Deep in My Heart" – 3:34
- European, Australian and Japanese CD maxi-single
1. "Oops!... I Did It Again" (album version) – 3:31
2. "Oops!... I Did It Again" (instrumental) – 3:29
3. "From the Bottom of My Broken Heart" (Ospina's Millennium Funk mix) – 3:29
4. "Deep in My Heart" – 3:34
- UK CD maxi single
1. "Oops!... I Did It Again" (album version) – 3:31
2. "Deep in My Heart" – 3:34
3. "From the Bottom of My Broken Heart" (Ospina's Millennium Funk mix) – 3:29
- UK cassette single
1. "Oops!... I Did It Again" (album version) – 3:31
2. "Oops!... I Did It Again" (instrumental) – 3:29
3. "From the Bottom of My Broken Heart" (Ospina's Millennium Funk mix) – 3:29
- CD maxi single—Remixes
1. "Oops!... I Did It Again" (album version) – 3:31
2. "Oops!... I Did It Again" (Rodney Jerkins remix) – 3:07
3. "Oops!... I Did It Again" (Ospina's crossover mix) – 3:15
4. "Oops!... I Did It Again" (Riprock 'n' Alex G. Oops! We Remixed Again!) [radio mix] – 3:54
5. "Oops!... I Did It Again" (Ospina's deep club mix) – 6:05
6. "Oops!... I Did It Again" (Riprock 'n' Alex G. Oops! We Remixed Again!) [club mix] – 4:52
7. "Oops!... I Did It Again" (Ospina's instrumental dub) – 6:05
- 12-inch vinyl
1. "Oops!... I Did It Again" (Rodney Jerkins remix) – 3:07
2. "Oops!... I Did It Again" (Music Breakdown mix) – 3:16
3. "Oops!... I Did It Again" (Ospina's crossover mix) – 3:15
4. "Oops!... I Did It Again" (Jack D. Elliot club mix) – 6:24
5. "Oops!... I Did It Again" (Riprock 'n' Alex G. Oops! We Remixed Again!) – 4:52
6. "Oops!... I Did It Again" (Ospina's deep edit) – 3:24
- 2025 digital single
1. "Oops!... I Did It Again" – 3:32
2. "Oops!... I Did It Again" (Rodney Jerkins remix) – 3:09
3. "Oops!... I Did It Again" (Ospina's crossover mix) – 3:14
4. "Oops!... I Did It Again" (Ospina's deep club mix) – 6:08
5. "Oops!... I Did It Again" (Ospina's deep radio edit) – 3:24
6. "Oops!... I Did It Again" (Ospina's instrumental dub) – 6:07
7. "Oops!... I Did It Again" (Riprock 'n' Alex G. Oops! We Remixed Again!) – 4:53
8. "Oops!... I Did It Again" (Riprock 'n' Alex G. Oops! We Remixed Again! radio edit) – 3:56
9. "Oops!... I Did It Again" (Jack D. Elliot club mix) – 6:24
10. "Oops!... I Did It Again" (Music Breakdown mix) – 3:18
11. "Oops!... I Did It Again" (instrumental) – 3:32
- 4-inch vinyl
1. "...Baby One More Time" – 3:32
2. "Oops!... I Did It Again" – 3:33

== Credits and personnel ==
Credits are adapted from the liner notes of Oops!... I Did It Again.

=== Personnel ===
- Britney Spears – lead vocals, background vocals
- Max Martin – producer, lyrics, composition, arrangement, mixing, programming, keyboard, background vocals
- Rami Yacoub – producer, composition, arrangement, mix engineer, programming, keyboard
- John Amatiello – Pro Tools engineer
- Esbjörn Öhrwall – guitar
- Johan Carlberg – guitar
- Tomas Lindberg – bass guitar
- Nana Hedin – background vocals
- Chatrin Nyström – crowd noise
- Jeanette Stenhammar – crowd noise
- Johanna Stenhammar – crowd noise
- Charlotte Björkman – crowd noise
- Therese Ancker – crowd noise

== Charts ==
=== Weekly charts ===
Weekly chart performance
Chart (2000)	Peak position
Australia (ARIA)	1
Austria (Ö3 Austria Top 40)	2
Belgium (Ultratop 50 Flanders)	3
Belgium (Ultratop 50 Wallonia)	1
Canada Top Singles (RPM)	1
Canada Adult Contemporary (RPM)	15
Chile (EFE)	6
Croatia International Airplay (HRT)	1
Czech Republic (Rádio – Top 100)	2
Denmark (IFPI)	1
El Salvador (EFE)	10
Eurochart Hot 100 (Music & Media)	1
European Radio Top 50 (Music & Media)	1
Finland (Suomen virallinen lista)	2
France (SNEP)	4
Germany (GfK)	2
Greece (IFPI)	4
Guatemala (EFE)	1
Hungary (Mahasz)	1
Hungary Airplay (Music & Media)	1
Iceland (Tónlistinn)	1
Ireland (IRMA)	2
Italy (FIMI)	1
Italy Airplay (Music & Media)	4
Japan (Oricon)	67
Netherlands (Dutch Top 40)	1
Netherlands (Single Top 100)	1
New Zealand (Recorded Music NZ)	1
Norway (VG-lista)	1
Poland (ZPAV)	1
Portugal (AFP)	5
Romania (Romanian Top 100)	1
Scottish Singles Sales (Official Charts)	1
Singapore (SPVA)	1
Spain (Promusicae)	1
Sweden (Sverigetopplistan)	1
Switzerland (Schweizer Hitparade)	1
UK Singles (Official Charts)	1
UK Indie (Official Charts)	1
Uruguay (EFE)	10
US Billboard Hot 100	9
US Adult Pop Airplay (Billboard)	27
US Pop Airplay (Billboard)	1
US Rhythmic Airplay (Billboard)	8
US CHR/Pop (Radio & Records)	1
US CHR/Rhythmic (Radio & Records)	8
US Hot AC (Radio & Records)	24

Chart (2024)	Peak position
Poland (Polish Airplay Top 100)	46

=== Year-end charts ===
Year-end chart performance for "Oops!... I Did It Again"
Chart (2000)	Position
Australia (ARIA)	35
Austria (Ö3 Austria Top 40)	12
Belgium (Ultratop 50 Flanders)	11
Belgium (Ultratop 50 Wallonia)	16
Brazil (Crowley Broadcast Analysis)	44
Denmark (Tracklisten)	11
Eurochart Hot 100 (Music & Media)	7
European Radio Top 100 (Music & Media)	6
France (SNEP)	31
Germany (Media Control)	15
Iceland (Íslenski Listinn Topp 40)	18
Ireland (IRMA)	9
Netherlands (Dutch Top 40)	18
Netherlands (Single Top 100)	16
New Zealand (RIANZ)	23
Romania (Romanian Top 100)	3
Sweden (Hitlistan)	3
Switzerland (Schweizer Hitparade)	7
Taiwan (Hito Radio)	25
UK Singles (OCC)	15
US Billboard Hot 100	55
US Adult Top 40 (Billboard)	89
US Mainstream Top 40 (Billboard)	26
US Rhythmic Top 40 (Billboard)	39

=== Decade-end charts ===
Decade-end chart performance for "Oops!... I Did It Again"
Chart (2000–2009)	Position
Netherlands (Single Top 100)	84

== Certifications ==
Certifications for "Oops!... I Did It Again"
Region	Certification	Certified units/sales
Australia (ARIA)	Platinum	70,000^{^}
Austria (IFPI Austria)	Gold	25,000^{*}
Belgium (BRMA)	Platinum	50,000^{*}
Canada (Music Canada)	Platinum	80,000^{‡}
Denmark (IFPI Danmark)	Platinum	90,000^{‡}
France (SNEP)	Gold	250,000^{*}
Germany (BVMI)	Gold	250,000^{^}
Italy (FIMI) (since 2009)	Gold	35,000^{‡}
Netherlands (NVPI)	Gold	40,000^{^}
New Zealand (RMNZ)	2× Platinum	60,000^{‡}
Portugal (AFP)	Gold	20,000^{‡}
Spain (Promusicae)	Platinum	60,000^{‡}
Sweden (GLF)	2× Platinum	60,000^{^}
Switzerland (IFPI Switzerland)	Gold	25,000^{^}
United Kingdom (BPI)	2× Platinum	1,200,000^{‡}
United States (RIAA)	4× Platinum	4,000,000^{‡}
^{*} Sales figures based on certification alone.^{^} Shipments figures based on certification alone.^{‡} Sales+streaming figures based on certification alone.

== Release history ==
Release dates and formats for "Oops!... I Did It Again"
Region	Date	Format(s)	Label(s)	Ref.
United States	April 11, 2000	Contemporary hit radio	Jive	
Germany	April 25, 2000	Maxi CD	Rough Trade	
United States	May 1, 2000	Hot adult contemporary radio	Jive	
United Kingdom	May 1, 2000	Cassette; CD	Jive	
Japan	May 3, 2000	Maxi CD	Avex Trax	
France	May 16, 2000	CD	Jive	
New Zealand	May 22, 2000	Cassette; CD	Jive	
France	June 6, 2000	Maxi CD (remixes)	Jive	
Germany	June 14, 2000	Maxi CD (remixes)	Rough Trade	
United States	September 26, 2025	4-inch vinyl (Note: exclusive to Target; double single with "...Baby One More Time")	Legacy	

== See also ==
- List of Romanian Top 100 number ones of the 2000s
- List of most expensive music videos
