= Sleeved blanket =

Body-length blanket with sleeves usually made of fleece or nylon material

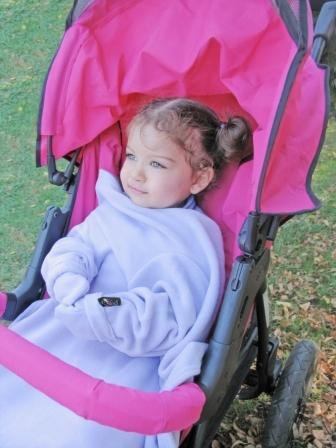
Child in a Doojo sleeve blanket

A sleeved blanket is a body-length blanket with sleeves usually made of fleece or nylon material. It is similar in design to a bathrobe but reversed (with the opening in the back). The Snuggie brand's infomercial campaign, starting in 2008, popularized sleeved blankets and drew satire in American popular culture.

== Popularity ==
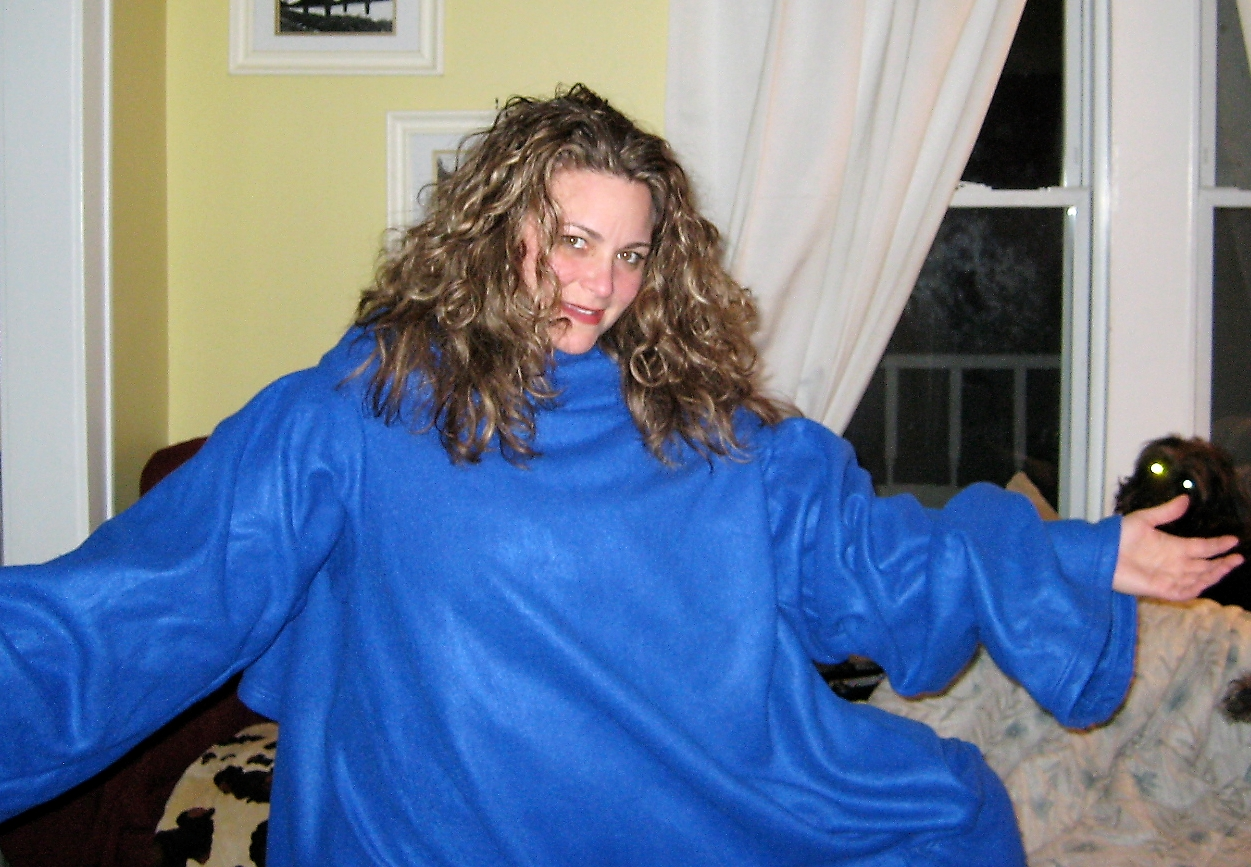
A woman wearing a blue Snuggie

In late 2008 and early 2009, the Snuggie brand of sleeved blankets became a pop culture phenomenon in the United States, sometimes described humorously as a "cult".

The product became famous after a direct response commercial promoting the product was aired in the US. It was featured on television programs like Today, where cast and crew donned Snuggie blankets for a segment, which was described as looking like a Black Protestant choir. Others have described mass-snuggie wearing as looking like a Harry Potter convention. The Associated Press likened it to a "monk's ensemble in fleece" and proclaimed it the "ultimate kitsch gift". The Snuggie brand sleeved blanket initially sold singly for $14.95, and later in sets of two for $19.95.

The Snuggie was parodied as the Slanket in an episode of NBC's 30 Rock entitled "The Ones". The product has also been ridiculed as a "backwards robe" or simple reinvention of the coat on radio and television talk shows in the United States. Comparisons have also been made with the Thneed, a highly promoted, amorphous garment in the Dr. Seuss story, The Lorax.

On January 30, 2009, a group organized a pub crawl wearing Snuggies in Cincinnati. In the following months, they went on to complete over 40 more across the nation. Later, a group organized a Snuggie pub crawl in Chicago to raise money for an African orphanage, which led to similar events throughout the United States. Derek Hunter, an employee at the conservative think tank Americans for Tax Reform, started a Facebook page called "The Snuggie Cult"; he convinced fellow conservatives including Joe the Plumber, Tucker Carlson, and Andrew Breitbart to pose wearing the robes.

The phenomenon resulted in sales of the Snuggie brand sleeved blanket and its rivals that far exceeded their distributors' expectations: more than 4 million Snuggies as of December 2009 and 1 million Slankets as of February 2009. The phenomenon has even resulted in variations such as "Snuggie for Dogs" and Snuggie with printed patterns.

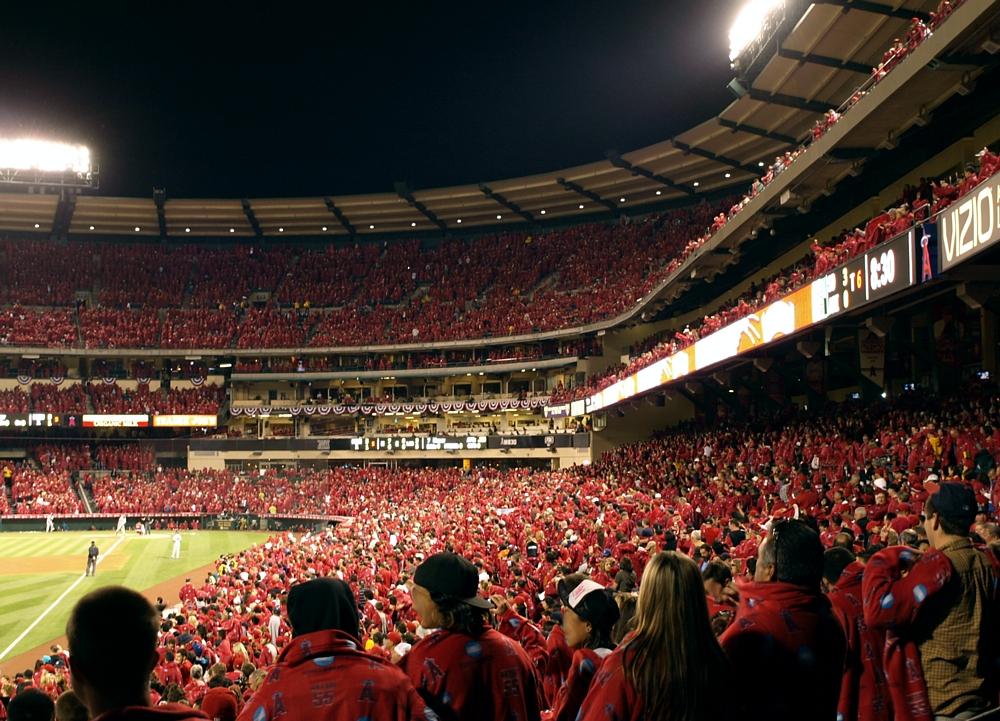
Spectators attempting to break the Guinness World Records record for the "largest gathering of people wearing fleece blankets" at Angel Stadium of Anaheim on April 6, 2010

In the summer of 2009, the Designer Snuggie was released to the public, as well as the Snuggie for Kids and the Snuggie for Dogs.

On March 5, 2010, at a Cleveland Cavaliers game, Snuggie wearers broke a world record for sleeved blanket wearing. Over 22,500 fans wore custom-made, limited edition Cavaliers Snuggie blankets for 5 minutes. A Guinness World Records representative was on hand to present the official World Record certificate to KeyBank, the Cavaliers, and Snuggie. However, in just a little over a month, the feat was broken during a Los Angeles Angels of Anaheim home game when over 40,000 spectators wore a promotional Hideki Matsui sleeved blanket for five minutes.

In March 2018, Allstar Marketing Group, owner of the "Snuggie" brand, was fined $7.5 million by the US Federal Trade Commission for deceptive marketing and ordered to provide refunds to deceived customers.

=== Parodies ===
Several hundred parodies of the commercial have appeared on YouTube, as well as numerous fan pages on Facebook. Mockings of the product and its commercial have also been made by comedians such as Daniel Tosh, Jay Leno, Ellen DeGeneres, Bill Maher, Jon Stewart, Whoopi Goldberg, Tim Burton, Loulogio (in Spain), Tim Hawkins, and on iCarly, as well as website parodies and Lacie and Olivia. Jacksfilms's YouTube parody, entitled "The WTF Blanket", has reached over 25 million views as of 2025.

== Commercial variations ==
In April 2005, Sean Iannuzzi began selling the Freedom Blanket brand of sleeved blankets.

Gary Clegg, creator of the Slanket, stated his first prototype was created by modifying a sleeping bag in 1998 for use in his cold Maine dorm room. Clegg cut a hole in his sleeping bag because his TV remote did not work inside his sleeping bag. He later asked his mother to sew a single sleeve onto it. Clegg later developed the Slanket as a commercial product with two sleeves, launching the product in 2006.

In autumn 2008, the Snuggie brand debuted with a television commercial campaign. As of January 2009, over 20 million Snuggies had been sold across the United States, Canada, and Australia.

Another variant, the Toasty Wrap, has been sold via infomercials hosted by Montel Williams as a method for saving on heating costs. However, based on the similarities of the Toasty Wrap's advertising to that of Snuggie, BrandFreak suggested that it is probable that both brands originate with the same manufacturer.

The rock band Weezer released its own Snuggie blanket in November 2009, which is available in solid blue, green and burgundy with the name "Weezer" on it in white font. It has been dubbed the "Wuggie".

It is sometimes marketed as a "comfy blanket".

The former business Go-Go Blanket holds the US patent for child-sized sleeved blankets. Go-Go Blanket was created as a travel blanket for children that claimed compliance with federal safety regulations for car seats and strollers. Another competing product is the Oodie, a knee-length sleeved and hooded blanket founded in Australia. An Italian version sold in Europe, Canada, and Japan is the "Kanguru," which includes a large front pocket reminiscent of a kangaroo's pouch.

In 2017, a U.S. trade court ruled that the product should be classified as a blanket, rather than clothing, as government lawyers had been trying to claim. In the United States, the tariff on imported blankets is 8.5 percent, whereas the tariff on imported "pullover apparel" is significantly higher at 14.9 percent.

== See also ==
- Bathrobe
- Blanket
- Cloak
- Hospital gown
- Kitsch
- Robe
- Shawl
