= Vivienne Pinay =

American drag performer

- Born: Michael Donehoo; Atlanta, Georgia
- Occupations: Personal assistant; drag queen (retired)
- Television: RuPaul's Drag Race (season 5); Face Off (season 9)

Vivienne Pinay is the stage name of Michael Donehoo, an American retired drag performer known for competing on the fifth season of the American television series RuPaul's Drag Race. She has also appeared on the ninth season of Face Off and Skin Wars.

== Early life ==
Donehoo was born and raised in Atlanta and is of Filipino descent. He became interested in drag at a young age after seeing RuPaul on VH1.

== Career ==
Donehoo sells wigs. As of 2020, he was also a personal assistant to Drag Race contestant Alyssa Edwards.

Donehoo also appeared in the ninth season of the television series Face Off in 2015.

=== Drag ===
Donehoo has been a drag performer; he has said of his female persona Vivienne Pinay: "Vivienne is named after my Southern Grandmother. And Pinay means Filipino girl." Vivienne Pinay has been a member of the Haus of Edwards, which has also included Drag Race contestants Alyssa Edwards, Cheryl Hole, Gia Gunn, Laganja Estranja, Plastique Tiara, and Shangela.

Vivienne Pinay competed on the fifth season of RuPaul's Drag Race, which aired in 2013. She entered the Werk Room wearing a polka dot dress and red heels; Hyphen magazine said she resembled Bettie Page. On the fourth episode ("Black Swan: Why It Gotta Be Black?"), she and Honey Mahogany placed in the bottom two of a challenge that tasked contestants with performing in a ballet based on the life of RuPaul. Neither contestant impressed RuPaul enough during a lip-sync contest to "Oops!... I Did It Again" (2000) by Britney Spears, and both were eliminated from the competition in the show's first-ever double elimination.

Thrillist's Brian Moylan ranked Vivienne Pinay number 75 out of the show's 113 contestants in 2017. Stephen Daw of Billboard included the double elimination in a 2018 list of the show's "most shocking" moments. In 2019, Bernardo Sim of Screen Rant called the lip-sync between Honey Mahogany and Vivienne Pinay "so bad, so boring, and so low-energy", and wrote: "It is fair to say that Ru made the right call to send them both contestants home that week, and fans have certainly enjoyed forgetting about that lip sync." Sim also included the double elimination in the website's 2020 list of the show's ten "most shocking" eliminations. Similarly, Mariana Fernandes included the double elimination in the website's 2020 overview of the ten "most shocking" eliminations on the show and RuPaul's Drag Race All Stars. She also included the performance in a 2020 list of the ten worst lip-syncs on Drag Race.

Since Drag Race, Vivienne Pinay "decided to keep a low profile and abandoned this drag persona", according to Out magazine. In 2015, she was among Drag Race contestants to appear on stage at the MTV Video Music Awards during Miley Cyrus and Wayne Coyne's performance of "Dooo It!" (2015). She also appeared on the series Skin Wars.

== Personal life ==
In 2013, Donehoo had a boyfriend and two dogs. He was based in New York City, as of 2015.

== Filmography ==
- RuPaul's Drag Race (season 5, 2013)
- RuPaul's Drag Race: Untucked
- Vivienne Pinay's Holiday Takeover (2013)
- Haus of Edwards Holiday Special (2015)
- RuPaul Drives
- Alyssa's Secret
- Face Off (season 9, 2015)
- Skin Wars (2015)
- Skin Wars: Naked Truth (2015)
