= Deven Green =

Canadian-American comedian

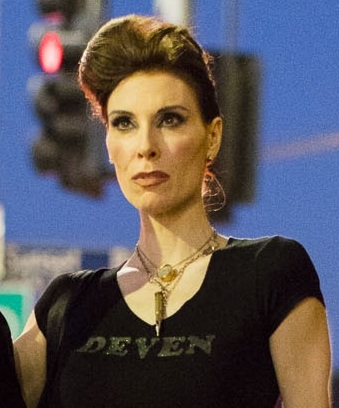
- Green in 2015
- Born: January 31, 1975 (age 51); Thompson, Manitoba, Canada
- Occupation: Comedian

Deven Green (born January 31, 1975) is a Canadian comedian and model who produces comedy parody videos, including as the satirical character Mrs. Betty Bowers, "America's Best Christian".

== Early life and career ==
Green was born and raised in Thompson, Manitoba, Canada, and holds dual Canadian–U.S. citizenship. She began working as a professional figure skater and later started her comedy career at The Second City in Toronto. She has acknowledged comedian Harland Williams as giving her a big break in Canada by casting her in the Canadian Broadcasting Corporation stand-up comedy show Comics!.

== Career ==
=== Parody work ===
Green portrays the satirical character Mrs. Betty Bowers, "America's Best Christian", created and written by writer Andrew Bradley.

Green's comedic work also includes videos that offer her comic parodies and commentary of existing footage of other entertainers. Green is best known in this genre for her viral video parody of "Welcome to My Home" starring soap opera actress Brenda Dickson.

In 2018, Green was a recipient of the American Humanist Association's Humanist Arts Award.

=== Print and modeling ===
The nail lacquer colour Deven Green was released by OCCmakeup at Sephora.

Green appeared as a spokesmodel for OCC Makeup's 2014 Spring Collection "Plastic Passion" and OCC Makeup's 2014 Fall/Winter Collection "Unknown Pleasures".

== Filmography ==
Year	Title	Role	Notes
2007	Back Soon	Trixie	
2012	RuPaul's Drag Race	Special Guest	Season 5
