= Lineysha Sparx =

American drag performer

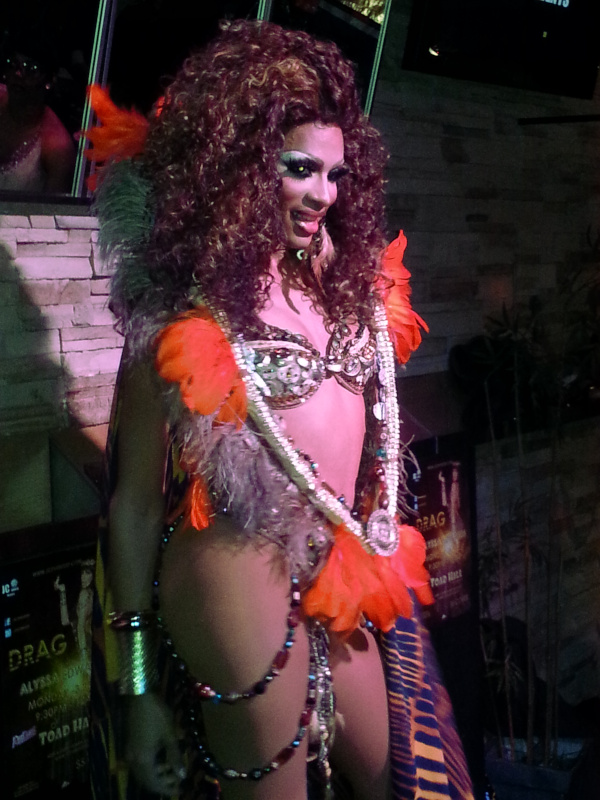
- Lineysha Sparx in 2013
- Born: Andrew Trinidad; New York, New York
- Television: RuPaul's Drag Race (season 5)

Andrew Trinidad, known by the stage name Lineysha Sparx, is an Afro–Puerto Rican drag performer who competed on the fifth season of RuPaul's Drag Race.

== Career ==
Trinidad competed as Lineysha Sparx on the fifth season of RuPaul's Drag Race, which aired in 2013. She placed ninth overall and won one main challenge. On the third episode ("Draggle Rock), she and Alaska Thunderfuck created the drag doll named Lil' Poundcake for the Miss Junior Drag Superstar mini-challenge. The doll went on to be sold commercially by Alaska and Lineysha Sparx as a plush toy. The queer music artist Chappell Roan would go on to cite Lil Poundcake as her inspiration for her drag looks and for her NPR Music Tiny Desk Concert performance.

Eventually, Lineysha Sparx was eliminated from the competition after placing in the bottom two of the Snatch Game challenge, during which she impersonated Cuban-American singer Celia Cruz, and losing a lip-sync against Detox to "Take Me Home" (1979) by Cher. Mariana Frenandez of Screen Rant said Lineysha Sparx should have won the design challenge. Lineysha Sparx struggled with speaking English and, according to authors of two books about Drag Race, was viewed as a stereotype. In 2023, Bernardo Sim of Pride.com wrote, "Due to her language barrier, Lineysha Sparx was regularly dismissed by other contestants and even by some judges. Alas, Lineysha did prove how gorgeous of a queen she is, and stunted that runway with some gorgeous costumes." In 2024, Sim said Lineysha Sparx's elimination "was truly shocking" and wrote: "She had a very strong track record at the beginning of the competition (including a maxi challenge win). Thus, sending her home in episode 5 was very unexpected, to say the least!"

Lineysha Sparx has performed at the Señor Frog's in Orlando and at the Latin Hump Day Fiesta at Pan Dulce in San Francisco. She performed at Club Hippo's Euforia Latina Party in Baltimore in 2013.

== Personal life ==
Trinidad was born in New York City and grew up in San Juan. He is of Dominican and Puerto Rican descent.

Lineysha Sparx is a "drag daughter" of season 4 contestant Madame LaQueer.

== Filmography ==
- Rise of the Zombies (2012)
- RuPaul's Drag Race (season 5; 2013)
- RuPaul's Drag Race: Untucked
- Faster Than the Speed of Light (2015)
- Skin Wars (2016)
