= Lip Synch Extravaganza Eleganza =

- RuPaul's Drag Race episode
- Episode no.: Season 5 Episode 2
- Presented by: RuPaul
- Original air date: February 4, 2013

Guest appearances
- Kristen Johnston; Juliette Lewis

Episode chronology
← Previous "RuPaullywood or Bust"	Next → "Draggle Rock"
- RuPaul's Drag Race season 5

"Lip Synch Extravaganza Eleganza" is the second episode of the fifth season of the American television series RuPaul's Drag Race. It originally aired on February 4, 2013. The episode's main challenge tasks the contestants with reenacting famous scenes from the companion series RuPaul's Drag Race: Untucked. Kristen Johnston and Juliette Lewis are guest judges. Lineysha Sparx wins the episode's main challenge. Serena ChaCha is eliminated from the competition after placing in the bottom and losing a lip-sync contest against Monica Beverly Hillz to "Only Girl (In the World)" (2010) by Rihanna.

== Episode ==
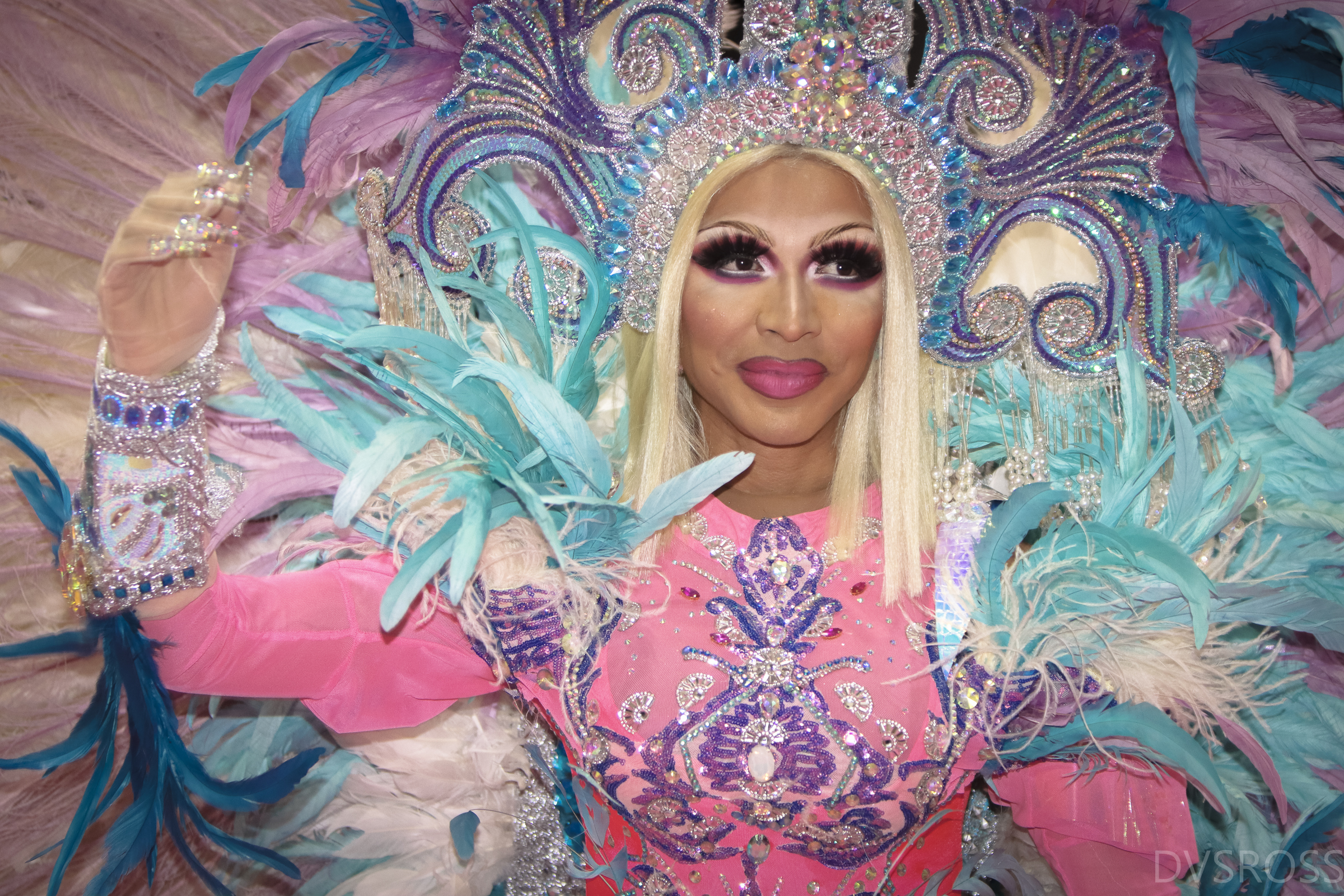
Serena ChaCha (pictured in 2022) is eliminated from the competition.

The contestants return to the workroom after Penny Tration's elimination on the previous episode. On a new day, RuPaul greets the group and reveals the mini-challenge, which tasks the contestants with lip-syncing to songs by RuPaul ("Tranny Chaser", "Lady Boy", and "Peanut Butter") with only their mouths visible. Detox, Ivy Winters, and Serena ChaCha win the mini-challenge. RuPaul then reveals the main challenge, which tasks the contestants with teaming up to lip-sync to and reenact famous scenes from RuPaul's Drag Race: Untucked. The winners of the mini-challenge get to select their teammates. Detox's team includes Alaska, Coco Montrese, and Monica Beverly Hillz. Ivy Winters chooses Honey Mahogany, Lineysha Sparx, and Vivienne Pinay. Serena ChaCha's team includes Alyssa Edwards, Jade Jolie, Jinkx Monsoon, and Roxxxy Andrews.

The groups decide on roles and start to rehearse. RuPaul returns to the workroom to meet with each group, asking questions and offering advice. The groups then film the scenes. On elimination day, the contestants make final preparations in the workroom for the fashion show. Monica Beverly Hillz is emotional and struggles with how to share a secret. On the main stage, RuPaul welcomes fellow judges Michelle Visage and Santino Rice, as well as guest judges Kristen Johnston and Juliette Lewis. RuPaul reveals the main challenge and fashion show ("dressed to impress") assignments, then the fashion show commences. After the contestants present their looks, the contestants and judges watch the filmed scenes.

Team Ivy Winters is the winning team, and Lineysha Sparx wins the challenge. The judges deliver their critiques. Monica Beverly Hillz reveals she is a trans woman. The judges deliberate, then share the results with the contestants. Monica Beverly Hillz and Serena ChaCha place in the bottom and face off in a lip-sync to "Only Girl (In the World)" (2010) by Rihanna. Monica Beverly Hillz wins the lip-sync and Serena ChaCha is eliminated from the competition.

== Production and broadcast ==
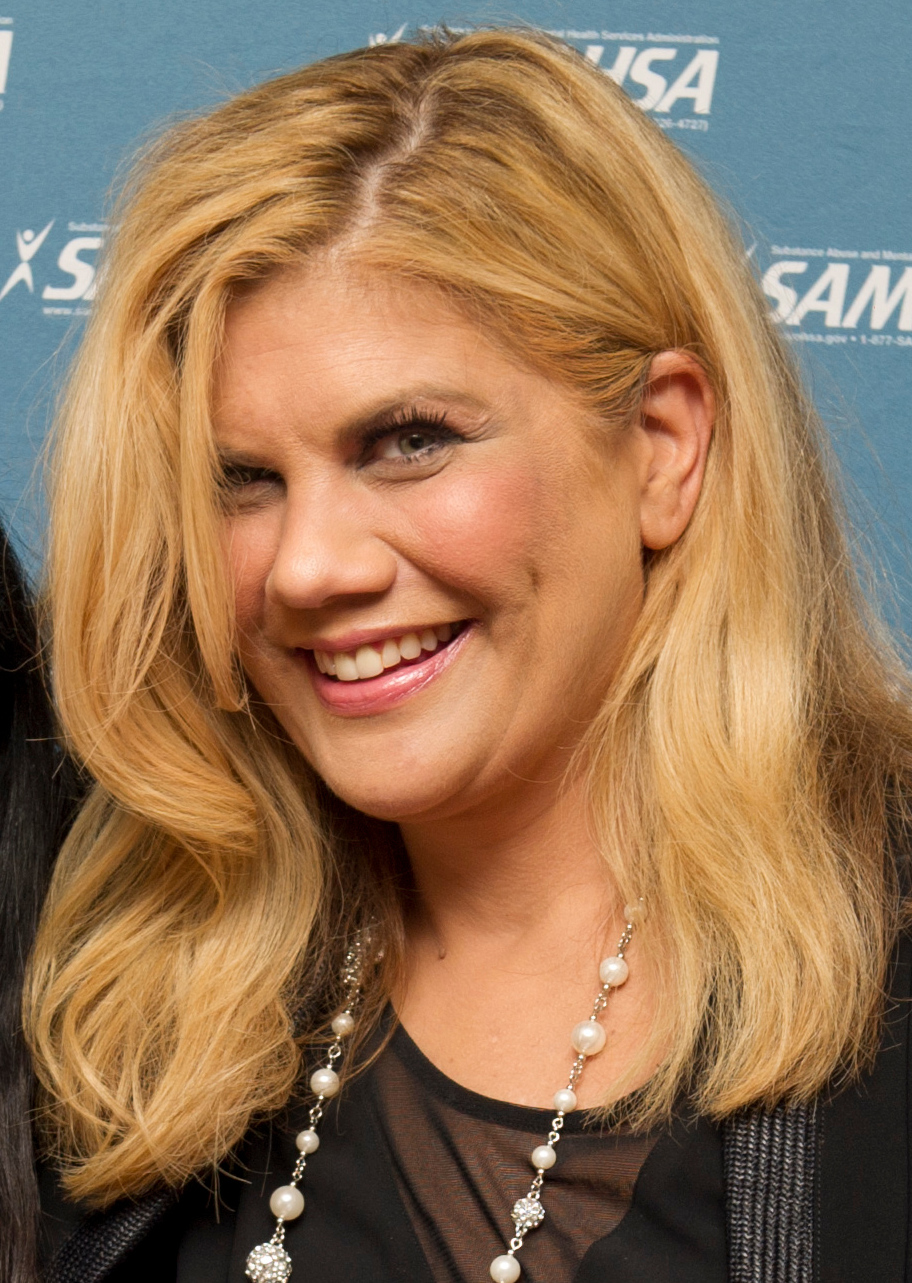
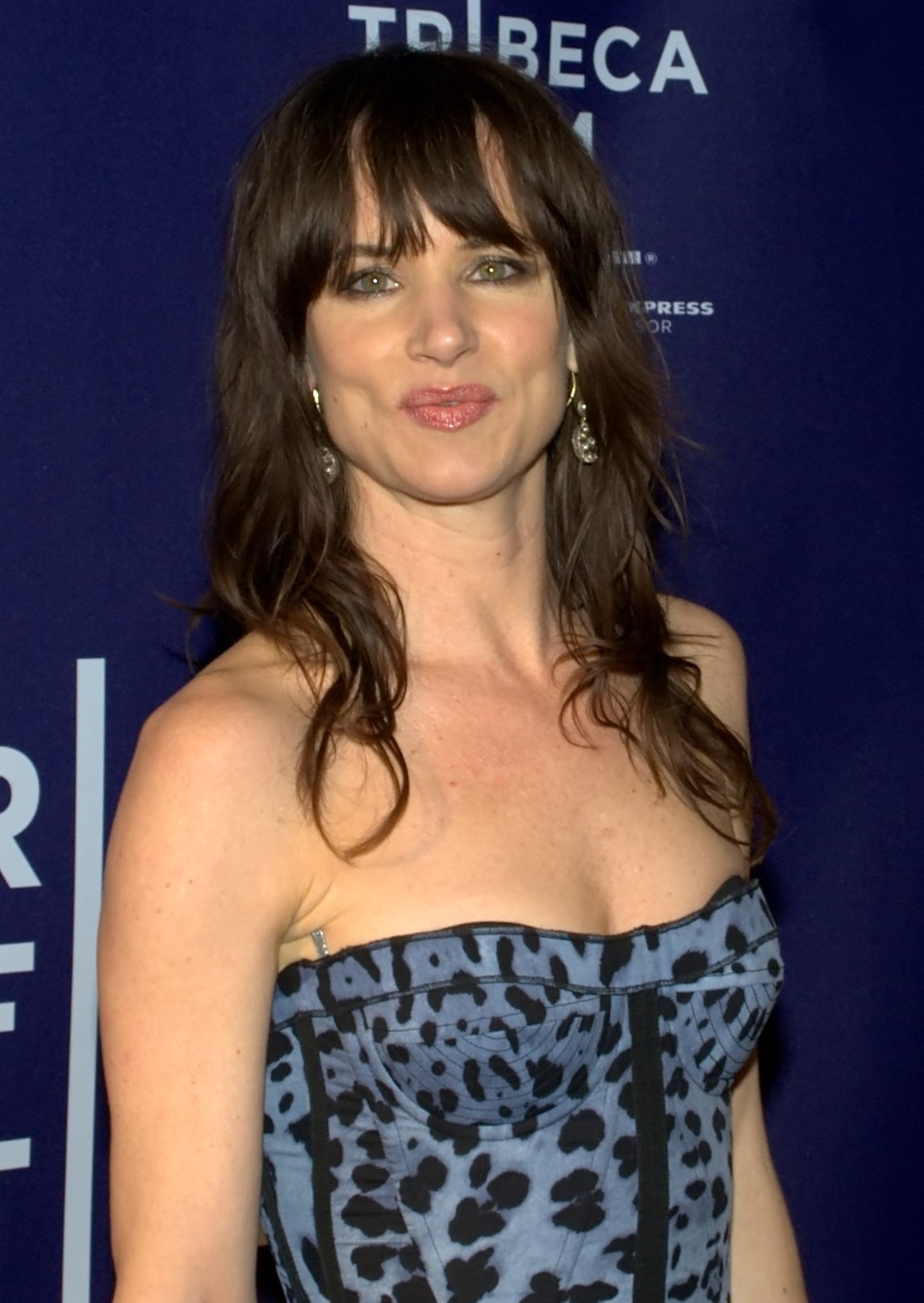
Kristen Johnston (top) and Juliette Lewis (bottom) are guest judges.

The episode originally aired on February 4, 2013.

Monica Beverly Hillz became the first contestant to come out as transgender while actively competing on the show.

=== Fashion ===
RuPaul wears a suit in the workroom. For the main stage, RuPaul wears a black-and-white dress and a blonde wig. For the fashion show, Lineysha Sparx wears a pink outfit and a dark wig. Honey Mahogany wears a pink kaftan and a blonde wig. Ivy Winters has a butterfly-inspired outfit and she walks on stilts. Vivan Pinay's short dress is gold. Alyssa Edwards pretends to walk a dog and wears a black outfit and a dark wig. Serena ChaCha's outfit is inspired by Panama. Jade Jolie's outfit is inspired by a lion tamer and she has a whip as a prop. Roxxxy Andrews has a outfit with fringe and a long brown wig. Jinkx Monsoon wears a white dress and a red wig. Monica Beverly Hillz has a black outfit and a long dark wig. Alaska wears a short black dress, matching high-heeled shoes, and a dark wig. Coco Montrese has a black-and-red fetish-inspired outfit and a short wig. Detox wears a black gown and a headpiece with feathers.

== Reception ==
Kevin O'Keeffe ranked the "Only Girl (In the World)" performance number 84 in INTO Magazine's 2018 "definitive ranking" of the show's lip-sync contests to date, writing: "Forgettable to wish-you-could-forget." Sam Brooks ranked the performance number 158 in The Spinoff's 2019 "definitive ranking" of the show's 162 lip-syncs to date, writing: "There’s been a scant amount of Rihanna lip-syncs on Drag Race, and they either turn out to be all-timers or duds. This is not just a dud, but the dud, thanks to a distant-to-the-point-of-Pluto Serena ChaCha and a defeated Monica Beverly Hillz half-stepping through this banger." In 2023, Eric Henderson of Slant Magazine said "Only Girl (In the World)" yielded one of the show's "most memorable" lip-syncs and said that Monica Beverly Hillz "ate each and every word of the song for breakfast". Bernardo Sim included the meme of Detox saying "I've HAD IT, officially" in Out magazine's 2025 list of the 32 "best and most hilarious" from the show.

== See also ==
- List of Juliette Lewis performances
