= Reunited (RuPaul's Drag Race season 5) =

Television episode

- RuPaul's Drag Race episode
- Episode no.: Season 5 Episode 14
- Presented by: RuPaul
- Original air date: May 6, 2013

Guest appearances
- BeBe Zahara Benet; Chad Michaels; La Toya Jackson; Latrice Royale; Raja; Sharon Needles; Tyra Sanchez

Episode chronology
← Previous "Countdown to the Crown"	Next → "RuPaul's Big Opening"
- RuPaul's Drag Race season 5

"Reunited" is the final episode of the fifth season of the American television series RuPaul's Drag Race. It originally aired on May 6, 2013. The episode sees the season's contestants reunite and a winner crowned.

American singer La Toya Jackson makes a guest appearance. Paula Abdul, Tamar Braxton, and Lady Bunny also appears in video messages. Former contestant Latrice Royale returns to announce this season's Miss Congeniality, Ivy Winters. Past winners BeBe Zahara Benet, Tyra Sanchez, Raja, Chad Michaels, and Sharon Needles also make guest appearances. Jinkx Monsoon is declared the season's winner.

== Episode ==
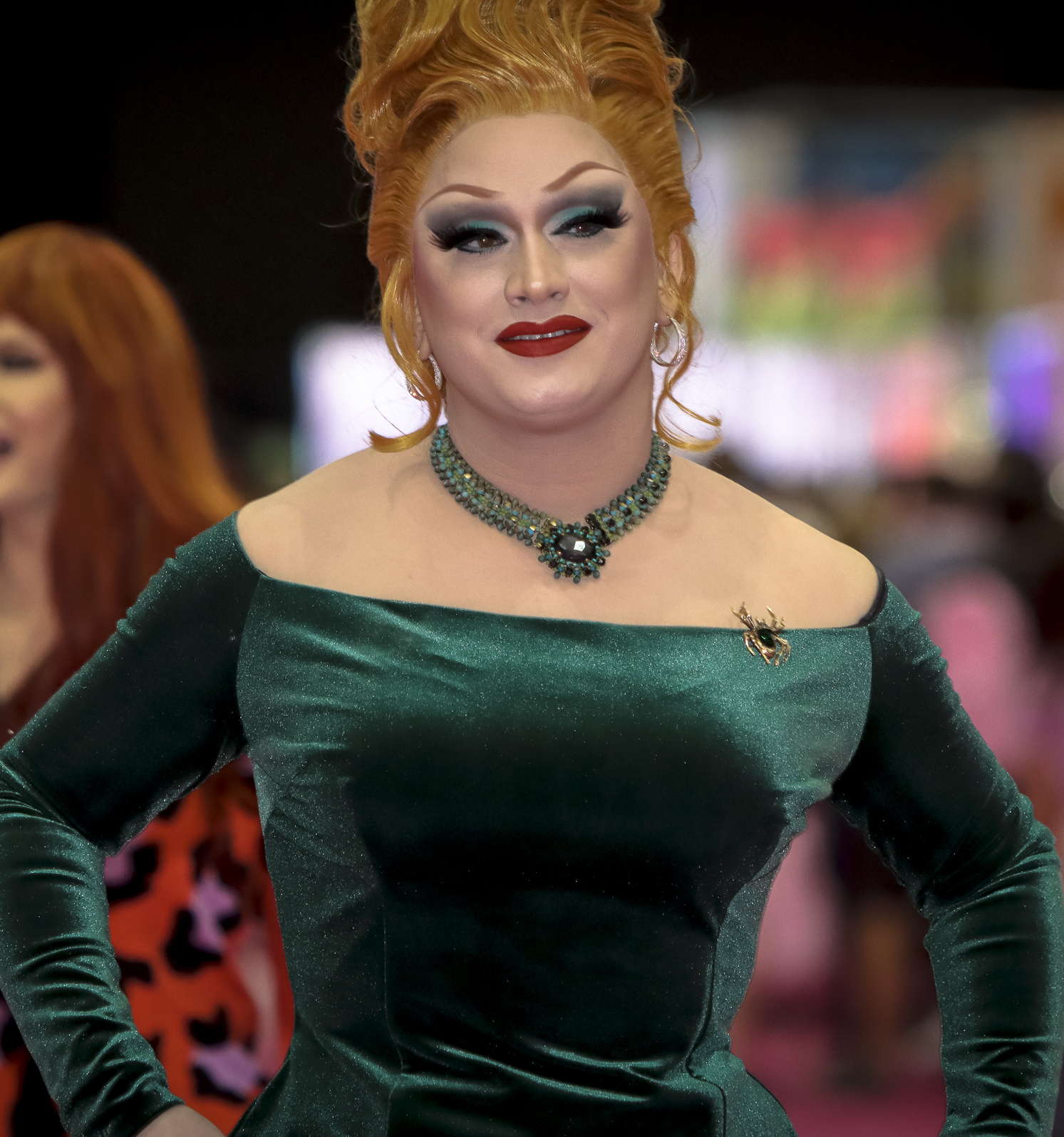
The episode sees Jinkx Monsoon (pictured in 2022) crowned the season's winner.

The episode starts with Michelle Visage interviewing guests at the "pink carpet" event. On the main stage, the season's contestants perform an opening number and walk the runway individually. RuPaul appears and leads the group in a performance of "Can I Get an Amen?", then welcomes the audience. RuPaul interviews the contestants in groups, starting with Penny Tration, Serena ChaCha, and Monica Beverly Hillz. Monica Beverly Hillz talks about being both a drag performer and a trans woman. The next group includes Vivienne Pinay, Honey Mahogany, and Lineysha Sparx.

A video montage gives an overview of divas in LGBTQ history. RuPaul then interviews Jade Jolie and Ivy Winters. RuPaul reveals why she says Ivy Winters's name in a specific way. RuPaul invites La Toya Jackson to the stage to demonstrate how Jackson introduces Edgar Winter in A Sizzling Spectacular! (1989). RuPaul then interviews Coco Montrese and Alyssa Edwards. Paula Abdul leaves a message video for the two contestants.

RuPaul shares a video montage of some of the show's worst runway presentations. RuPaul interviews Detox. Dancers join the stage, performing to "Peanut Butter" as a commercial outro. RuPaul interviews the three finalists—Alaska, Jinkx Monsoon, and Roxxxy Andrews. Latrice Royale, who was named Miss Congeniality for the fourth season, announces that Ivy Winters is this season's winner. RuPaul introduces a Snatch Game-related video montage featuring Tamar Braxton, Lady Bunny, and others. RuPaul shares another video of season highlights and interviews friends and family members of the finalists in the audience. RuPaul invites previous winners BeBe Zahara Benet, Tyra Sanchez, Raja, Chad Michaels, and Sharon Needles to the stage. RuPaul announces that Jinkx Monsoon is the winner, making Alaska and Roxxxy Andrews the runners-up.

== Production and broadcast ==
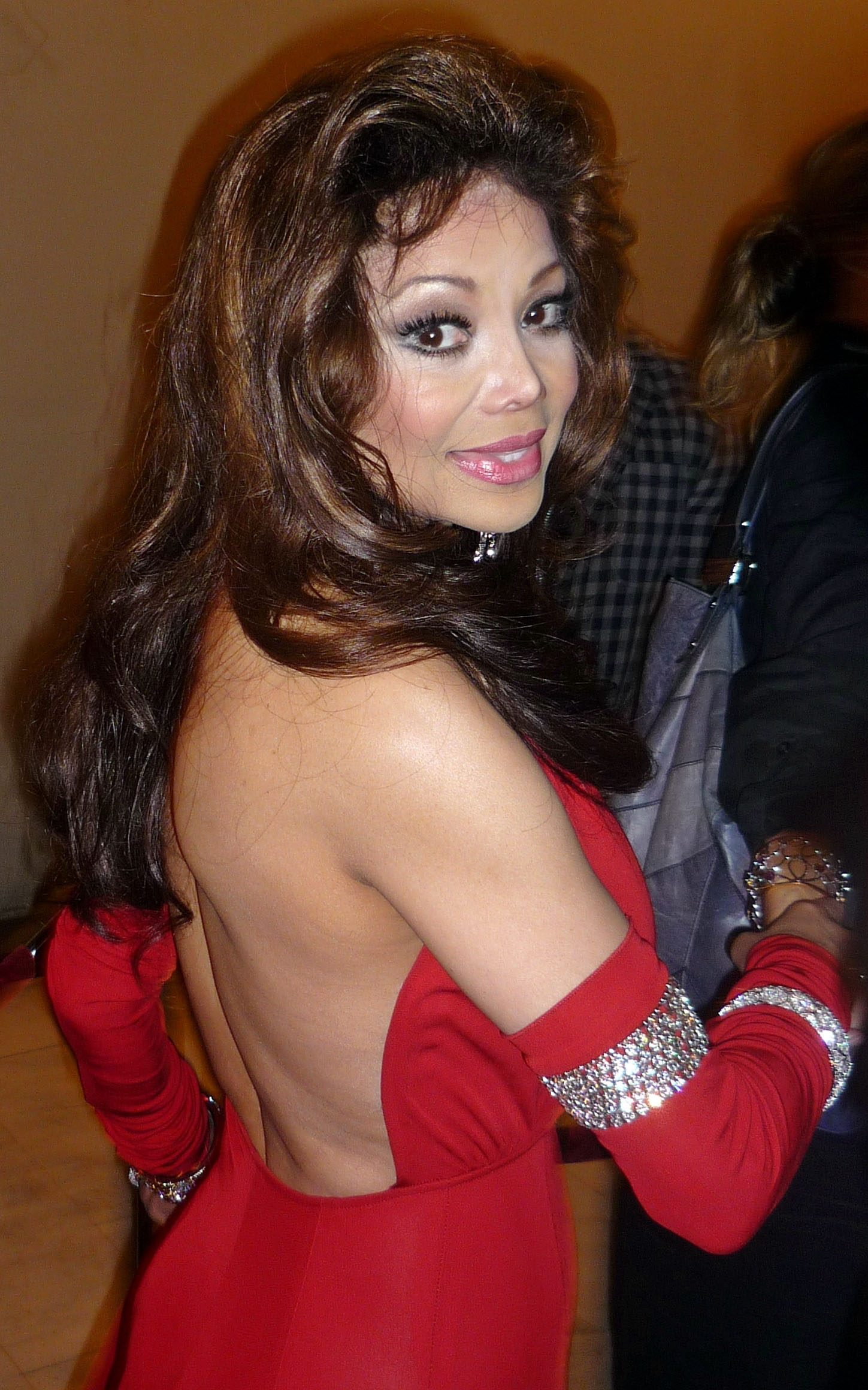
La Toya Jackson (pictured in 2000) makes a guest appearance.

The episode originally aired on May 6, 2013.

=== Fashion ===
For the opening number, Penny Tration wears purple and a blonde wig. She carries a hand fan. Serena ChaCha has a short black dress and a blonde wig. Monica Beverly Hillz wears a pink outfit with gold bracelets. Honey Mahogany has a blue-and-red outfit and a blonde wig. Vivienne Pinay wears a red dress and a long blonde wig. Lineysha Sparx has a colorful outfit with a headpiece and a long dark wig. Jade Jolie has a colorful outfit and a blonde wig.

Ivy Winters wears a red dress with matching gloves and hat, and a blonde wig. Alyssa Edwards has a short dress with a matching bow and a brown wig. Coco Montrese wears a green dress and a short wig. Detox has a black dress and a gray wig to match her skin. The three finalists all wear red. Alaska wears a large blonde wig. Jinkx Monsoon has red gloves and a large blonde wig. Roxxxy Andrews has a large brown wig.

RuPaul wears a white dress and a blonde wig. For the final interviews, Alaska wears a pink dress and a short blonde-and-pink wig. Jinkx Monsoon has an orange-and-yellow dress with butterfly accessories on the collar. She has a blonde wig. Roxxxy Andrews wears a jacket and a long dark wig.

== Reception and legacy ==
Detox's look garnered an especially positive reception. Matt Rogers and Bowen Yang ranked her look number 30 in Vulture's 2018 list of the show's 100 "greatest". Bianca Guzzo included Detox's look in IN Magazine's 2018 list of the show's ten "most memorable". Kyle Munzenrieder included Detox's look in W magazine's 2019 list of the "campiest red carpet looks of all time". Michael Ruby included her look in Them magazine's 2021 list of the ten best finale looks in the show's history. The show's eighth season had a challenge themed around Detox's look from this episode.
