= RuPaullywood or Bust =

- RuPaul's Drag Race episode
- Episode no.: Season 5 Episode 1
- Presented by: RuPaul
- Original air date: January 28, 2013

Guest appearances
- Camille Grammer; Mike Ruiz

Episode chronology
← Previous "Reunion"	Next → "Lip Synch Extravaganza Eleganza"
- RuPaul's Drag Race season 5

"RuPaullywood or Bust" is the first episode of the fifth season of the American television series RuPaul's Drag Race. It originally aired on January 28, 2013. The episode's main challenge tasks contestants with creating original looks from dumpster materials. Camille Grammer and Mike Ruiz are guest judges; the latter is also a photographer during the mini-challenge photo shoot.

Roxxxy Andrews wins the main challenge. Penny Tration is eliminated from the competition, after placing in the bottom two and losing a lip-sync contest against Serena ChaCha to "Party in the U.S.A." by Miley Cyrus.

== Episode ==
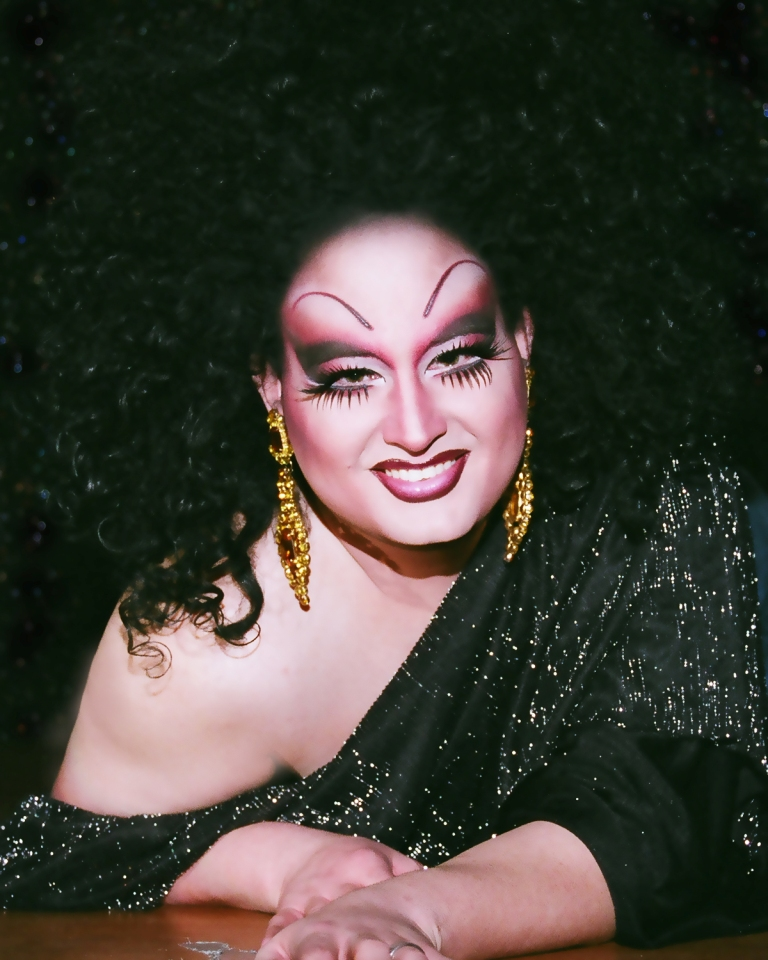
Penny Tration is eliminated from the competition.

Fourteen new contestants enter the Werk Room one at a time. It is revealed that Alyssa Edwards and Coco Montrese have a contentious history. RuPaul greets the group and reveals the first mini-challenge, which tasks contestants with participating in an underwater photo shoot with photographer Mike Ruiz. As photo shoots end, the contestants return to the Werk Room to get out of drag. Jinkx Monsoon shares that she has narcolepsy. RuPaul returns to the group with Ruiz to reveal that Detox is the winner of the mini-challenge.

RuPaul then teases that the contestants will be participating in a shopping spree. The contestants travel off-site via bus, lip-syncing to a song and spotting celebrity guests along the way. Camille Grammer welcomes the contestants and directs them to RuPaul at the VIP entrance. RuPaul reveals that the contestants will be creating "Hollywood red carpet couture" outfits from materials obtained via dumpster diving. The contestants collect materials from multiple dumpsters. Back in the Werk Room, the contestants begin to create their outfits. Alyssa Edward and Coco Montrese confront each other. RuPaul returns to meet with contestants individually and offer advice. Coco Montrese shares that she is distracted by Alyssa Edwards's presence. Roxxxy Andrews discusses her weight, including her significant weight loss. Alaska shares that she tried to be cast on the show many times previously. RuPaul reveals that Grammer and Ruiz are guest judges.

On elimination day, the contestants make final preparations for the fashion show. Some of the contestants ask Alaska about her relationship with former competitor Sharon Needles. She shares about the pressure of competing after Sharon Needles's success on the show. Serena ChaCha annoys some of the group. On the main stage, RuPaul welcomes fellow judges Michelle Visage and Santino Rice, as well as the guest judges, then the show commences. The judges deliver their critiques, deliberate, then share the results with the group. Alaska, Ivy Winters, Lineysha Sparx, and Roxxxy Andrews receive positive critiques, and Roxxxy Andrews wins the challenge. Jade Jolie, Penny Tration, and Serena ChaCha receive negative critiques, and Jade Jolie is deemed safe. Penny Tration and Serena ChaCha place in the bottom two and face off in a lip-sync contest to "Party in the U.S.A." (2009) by Miley Cyrus. Serena ChaCha wins the lip-sync and Penny Tration is eliminated from the competition.

== Production and broadcast ==
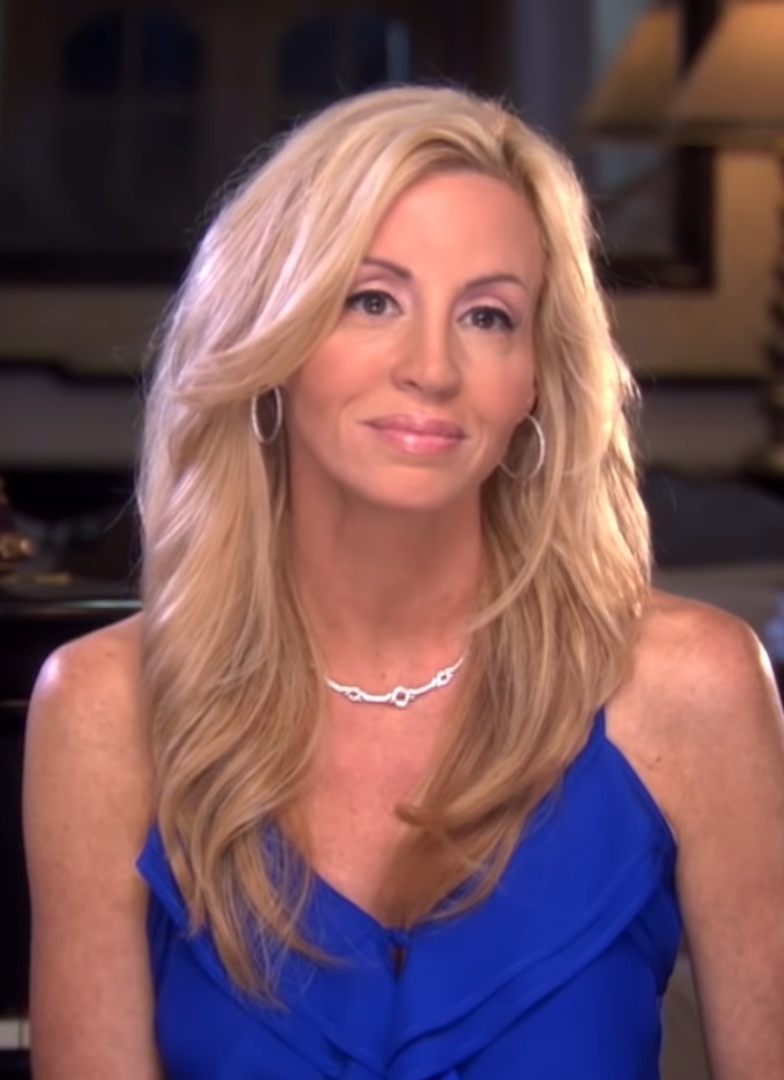
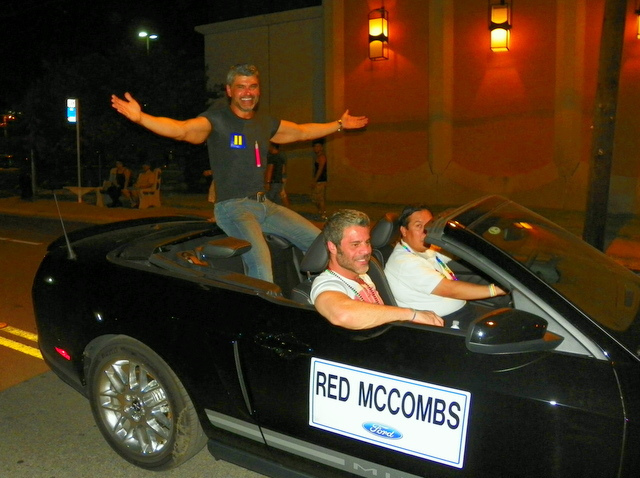
Camille Grammer (top, pictured in 2010) and Mike Ruiz (bottom, pictured as the grand marshal of San Antonio's pride parade in 2011) are guest judges.

The episode originally aired on January 28, 2013.

Cyrus has also been a guest judge on the show.

=== Fashion ===
For her entrance look, Detox wears a black-and-yellow dress and a black hat. Roxxxy Andrews has a jacket with black sequins. Jade Jolie has a colorful outfit and a black hat. Serena ChaCha's dress is pink and white. Alyssa Edwards has a short black-and-gold dress and a wig with curly hair. Jinkx Monsoon wears a swimsuit. Penny Tration's outfit has a floral design. Vivian Pinay's black dress has white polka dots. She has a pearl necklace, matching earrings, and red high-heeled shoes. Alaska enters with a horse mask over her face. She wears a black dress and a large blonde wig. Honey Mahogany has a white outfit and a blonde wig. Ivy Winters has barricade tape on her outfit and on her head. She also has a blonde wig. Monica Beverly Hillz wears a colorful outfit and a blonde wig. Lineysha Sparx's dress is yellow. Coco Montrese's outfit has an animal print. She wears sunglasses.

During the shopping spree, RuPaul wears an extraterrestrial-inspired pink suit. RuPaul wears a wig with curly blonde hair for the main stage.

For the fashion show, Roxxxy Andrews wears a black dress. Jinkx Monsoon's dress is aquamarine. She wears a blonde wig. Detox's dress has pink sequins and a purple wig. Ivy Winters wears a red dress and a blonde wig. Honey Mahogany's outfit and accessories are gold. Jade Jolie's dress is red. She has ruffles on the top of her head. Alyssa Edwards has feathers on her outfit. Penny Triton's dress is pink. Coco Montrese has two megaphones with the text "director" on her chest. Vivian Pinay has a gold-colored outfit. Alaska's dress is made of plastic wrap. She carries a plastic bag and has a blonde wig. Lineysha Sparx's dress has ruffles. She has a headpiece and a tall wig. Monica Beverly Hillz has pink shorts and a red wig. Serena ChaCha's dress is blue and green. Her blonde wig is curly.

== Reception ==
Oliver Sava of The A.V. Club gave the episode a rating of 'A-'. Eric Rezsnyak of City Magazine noted how the format was similar to previous season premieres of Drag Race and wrote, "Sure, there were moments that I laughed or gasped. A few of the photos and runway outfits were impressive. But on the whole it seemed rote, uninspired."

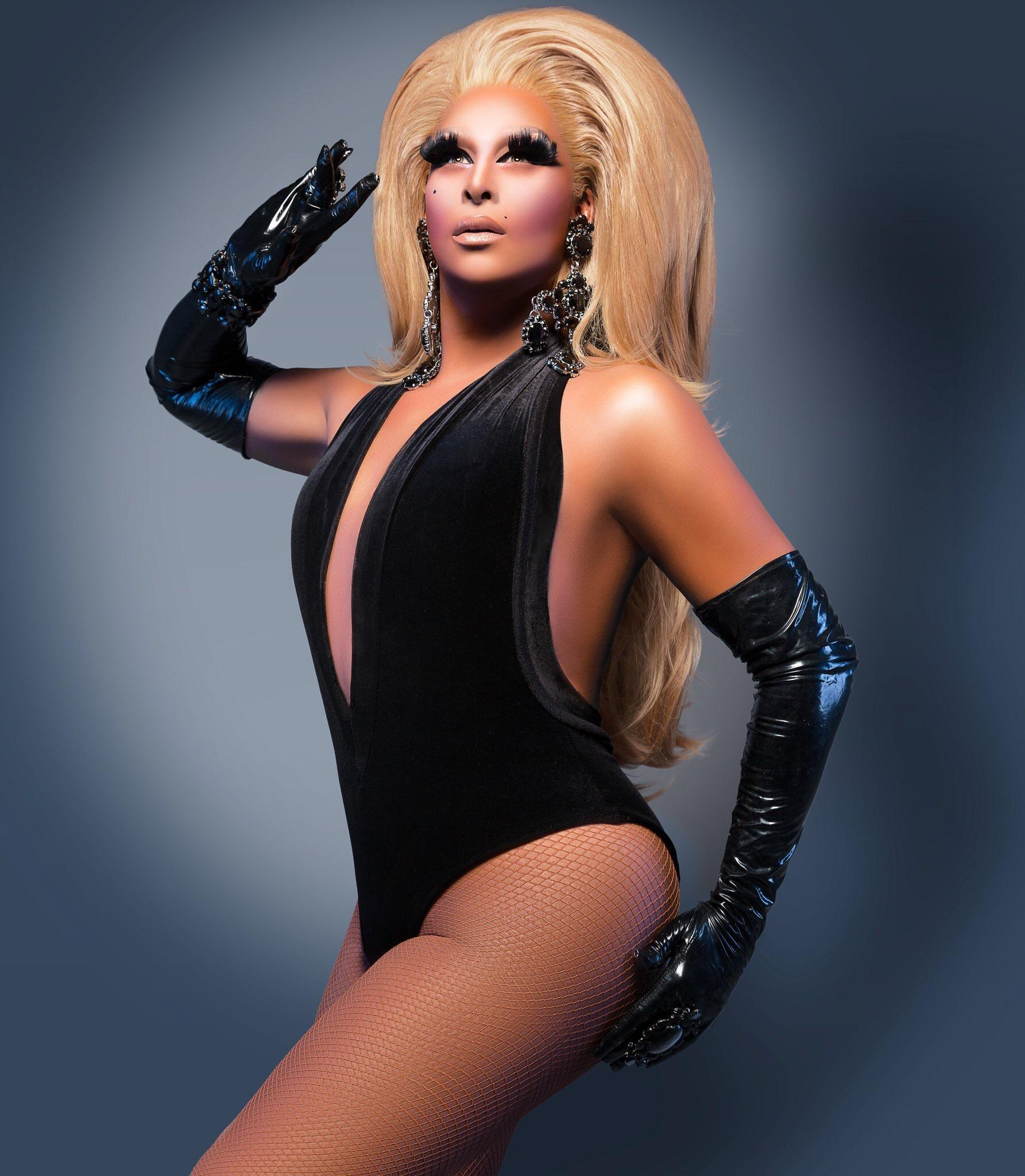
Roxxxy Andrews (pictured) wins the episode's main challenge.

Mariana Fernandes included Lineysha Sparx's outfit in Screen Rant's 2019 list of ten design challenge runner-ups "that should have won", and opined: "Roxxxy Andrews was the winner of the challenge, with her black dress cut up on the sides. A win that, let's be real, belonged to Lineysha Sparx's stunning pink gown. It looked more elegant and put together than Roxxxy's by a long shot!." Jessica Jalali included Alaska's outfit in the website's 2021 overview of the ten best "drag on a dime" runway looks, and wrote:

Many of the queens underestimated Alaska and her look from this dumpster diving Drag on a Dime challenge. Using items right out of California's finest trash bin, Alaska made a beautiful strapless gown that looked more couture than garbage. Alaska did a fantastic job of elevating her less than appealing materials, completely transforming the materials to suit her aesthetic.

Jalali opined, "The queens' judgemental attitudes toward Alaska's fashion went massively unfounded as Alaska ended up in the Top 2 that season. This look was the beginning of viewers getting a peek at just how unique and eccentric Alaska's style was."

In 2016, Pride.com's Buffy Flores included the lip-sync in an overview of the show's seven worst to date and said, "This is no way to start a season of Drag Race." Kevin O'Keeffe ranked "Party in the U.S.A." number 49 in INTO Magazine's 2018 "definitive ranking" of the show's lip-syncs to date. Sam Brooks ranked the song number 157 in The Spinoff's 2019 "definitive ranking" of the show's 162 lip-syncs to date. In 2020, Fernandes included the episode's lip-sync in Screen Rant's overview of the show's ten worst to date. In 2023, Emily Whittingham of Screen Rant wrote, "Because her time on the show was so brief, Penny's most notable moment was failing to know the words to the lip-sync battle song... She endeared herself to the other queens, who actively snubbed her lip-sync victor in the following episode." Bernardo Sim of Out called the lip-sync "messy" in 2023.
