= Not a Soul Can Clock (MBH Is Back) =

Single by Monica Beverly Hillz
- Released: July 14, 2023
- Length: 1:04
- Label: Self-released
- Songwriters: Monica Beverly Hillz; Thomas Morgan; Merrique Jenson
- Producers: Thomas Morgan; Merrique Jenson

Music video
- "Not a Soul Can Clock (MBH Is Back)" on YouTube

"Not a Soul Can Clock (MBH Is Back)" (also known as simply "Not a Soul Can Clock") is a song recorded by the American drag queen Monica Beverly Hillz. It was independently released on July 14, 2023. Following a performance of the song on season 8 of RuPaul's Drag Race All Stars, the song went viral on social media, with various mishearings of the song's lyrics gaining traction, including "not a soaking clock".

Inspired by house music, "Not a Soul Can Clock (MBH Is Back)" was written by Monica Beverly Hillz, Thomas Morgan and Merrique Jenson, while its production was handled by the latter two. The song has received various remixes since its release, including a version remixed by Cor.Ece featuring Ts Madison and Neverending Nina released on June 7, 2024, through SocialScope Productions.

== Background ==
On August 18, 2022, it was announced that Paramount+ had renewed RuPaul's Drag Race All Stars for an eighth season, scheduled to premiere in 2023. Its release date of May 12 was announced via a first look shown during the final episode of RuPaul's Drag Race season 15. The season's cast, including Monica Beverly Hillz, was revealed on April 20 via an announcement on YouTube. Following her elimination, Monica Beverly Hillz participated in the season's talent show, "The Fame Games Variety Extravaganza", during the eleventh episode of the same name, in which she performed "Not a Soul Can Clock".

=== Viral popularity ===
The song went viral on social media. Following the premiere of the episode, the phrase "not a soul can clock" became a trending topic on Twitter. Clips of Monica Beverly Hillz's performance circulated widely on social media, particularly because of the repeated lyric "not a soul can clock", whose pronunciation spawned numerous memes, with users humorously interpreting the lyric as "not a soaking clock". Amid the viral attention, Monica wrote on Twitter that she was considering leaving the platform because of the negative responses, stating that she was "over all the negativity". She later began sharing memes based on the performance. The performance has since been cited as one of the instances through which the phrase "clock it" entered mainstream popular culture.

== Release and promotion ==
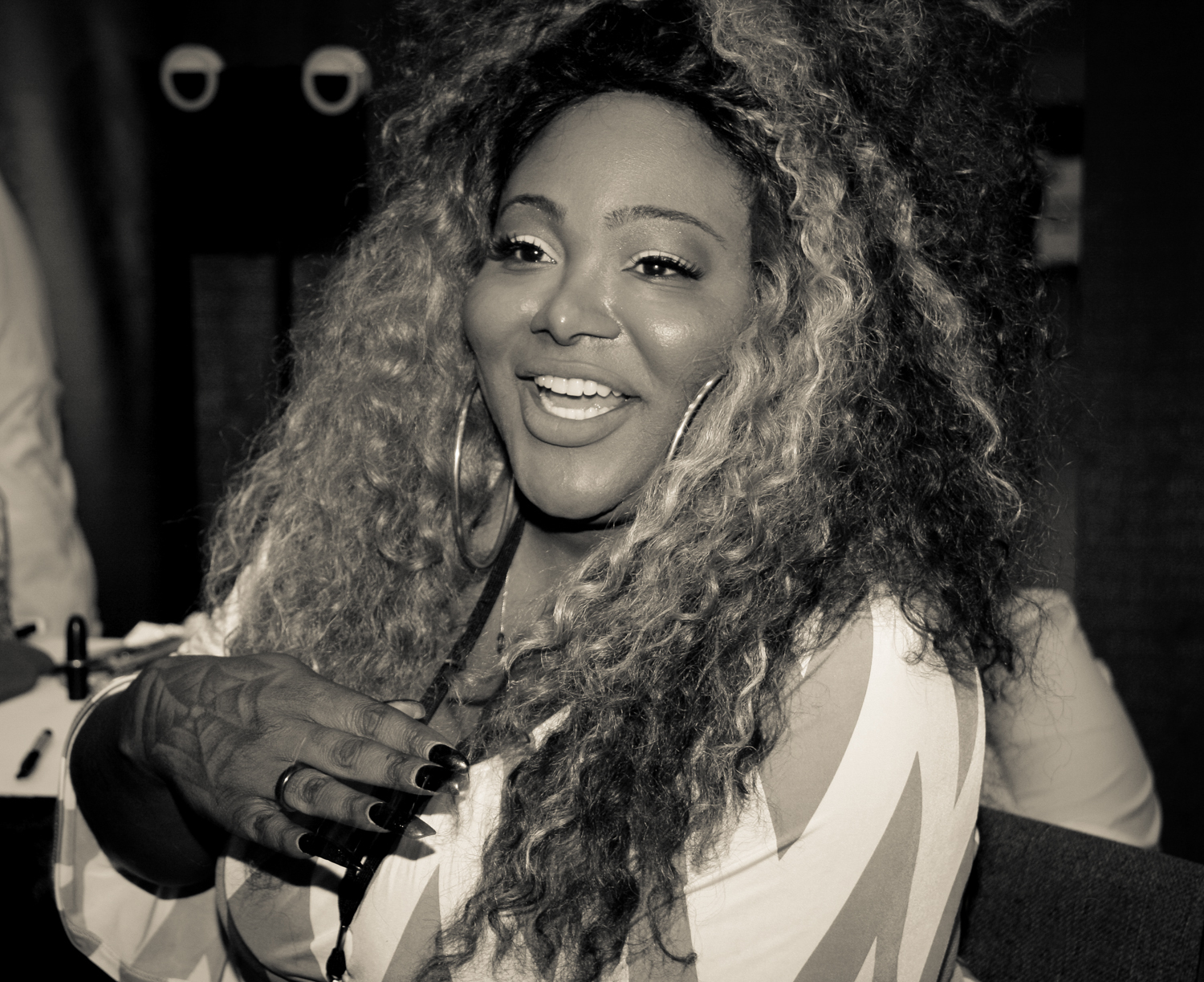
Ts Madison (pictured) is featured on the Cor.Ece remix of the song, alongside Neverending Nina.

"Not a Soul Can Clock (MBH Is Back)" was released to music streaming services on July 14, 2023, coinciding with the premiere of the RuPaul's Drag Race All Stars episode "The Fame Games Variety Extravaganza", in which the song was performed. A music video for the song was released on Monica Beverly Hillz's YouTube channel on July 27.

On July 7, 2024, a remix of the song by disc jockey Cor.Ece and featuring vocals by American entertainers Ts Madison and Neverending Nina was released through SocialScope Productions. On the same day, a music video for the remix was released on YouTube. The remix was released as a collaboration with Transformations, an advocacy group for transgender people. As part of its release, Monica Beverly Hillz and the organization published a toolkit created for sex workers, providing tips and strategies on topics including client verification and negotiating prices.

An extended play of remixes titled Not a Soul Can Clock (The EP) was released on July 27, 2024, through SocialScope Productions on music streaming services.

== Composition ==
"Not a Soul Can Clock (MBH Is Back)" was written by Monica Beverly Hillz, Thomas Morgan and Merrique Jenson, with the latter two producing it as well. In an Instagram post, Beverly Hillz said the song drew inspiration from house music, songs from the 1990s, the character Chi-Chi Rodriguez from the film To Wong Foo, Thanks for Everything! Julie Newmar (1995) and her own experiences as a sex worker in Chicago.

== Track listing ==
- Streaming/digital download
1. "Not a Soul Can Clock (MBH Is Back)" – 1:04
- Streaming/digital download – Cor.Ece remix
1. "Not a Soul Can Clock" (featuring Ts Madison and Neverending Nina; Cor.Ece remix) – 3:04
- Streaming/digital download – Not a Soul Can Clock (The EP)
1. "Not a Soul Can Clock" (featuring Ts Madison and Neverending Nina; Cor.Ece remix) – 3:04
2. "Not a Soul Can Clock" (featuring Ts Madison, Neverending Nina and Donato Fatuesi; Cor.Ece remix extended mix) – 4:02
3. "Not a Soul Can Clock" (featuring Ts Madison and Neverending Nina; Cor.Ece remix radio edit) – 3:04
4. "Not a Soul Can Clock" (featuring Ts Madison, Neverending Nina and Donato Fatuesi; Cor.Ece remix extended radio edit) – 4:02
5. "Not a Soul Can Clock" (featuring Ts Madison and Neverending Nina; Cor.Ece remix acapella version) – 3:04
6. "Not a Soul Can Clock" (featuring Ts Madison, Neverending Nina and Donato Fatuesi; Cor.Ece remix acapella extended version) – 4:02
7. "Not a Soul Can Clock" (instrumental version) – 3:04
8. "Not a Soul Can Clock" (instrumental extended version) – 4:03
9. "Not a Soul Can Clock" (featuring Ts Madison and Neverending Nina; Cor.Ece remix karaoke version) – 3:05
10. "Not a Soul Can Clock" (featuring Ts Madison, Neverending Nina and Donato Fatuesi; Cor.Ece remix karaoke extended version) – 4:03

== Personnel ==
Credits were adapted from Tidal.

- Monica Beverly Hillz – composer, lyricist
- Thomas Morgan – producer, composer, lyricist, beat maker, engineer, guitar, keyboard
- Merrique Jenson – composer, background vocals, executive producer

=== Cor.Ece remix ===
- Anthony Mclean – composer
- Cor.Ece – composer, lyricist, featured artist
- Mark Anthony Cole – composer
- Monica DeJesus Anaya – composer, lyricist
- Samuel Obey – composer
- Ts Madison – lyricist, featured artist
- Merrique Jenson – lyricist
- Neverending Nina – lyricist, featured artist

== Release history ==
Release dates and formats
Region	Date	Format	Version	Label	Ref.
Various	July 14, 2023	Music download; streaming	Original	Self-released	
Various	July 7, 2024	Music download; streaming	Cor.Ece remix	SocialScope	
Various	July 27, 2024	Music download; streaming	The EP	SocialScope	
