= Reunion (RuPaul's Drag Race) =

Episode of RuPaul's Drag Race

- RuPaul's Drag Race episode
- Episode no.: Season 4 Episode 14
- Presented by: RuPaul
- Original air date: April 30, 2012

Guest appearance
- Charo

Episode chronology
← Previous "The Final Three"	Next → "RuPaullywood or Bust"
- RuPaul's Drag Race (season 4)

"Reunion" (sometimes called "Reunited) is the fourteenth and final episode of the fourth season of the American television series RuPaul's Drag Race. It originally aired on April 30, 2012. The episode sees the season's contestants reunited and a winner crowned by RuPaul. Charo makes a guest appearance. Latrice Royale and Sharon Needles are named Miss Congeniality and the season's winner, respectively.

== Episode ==
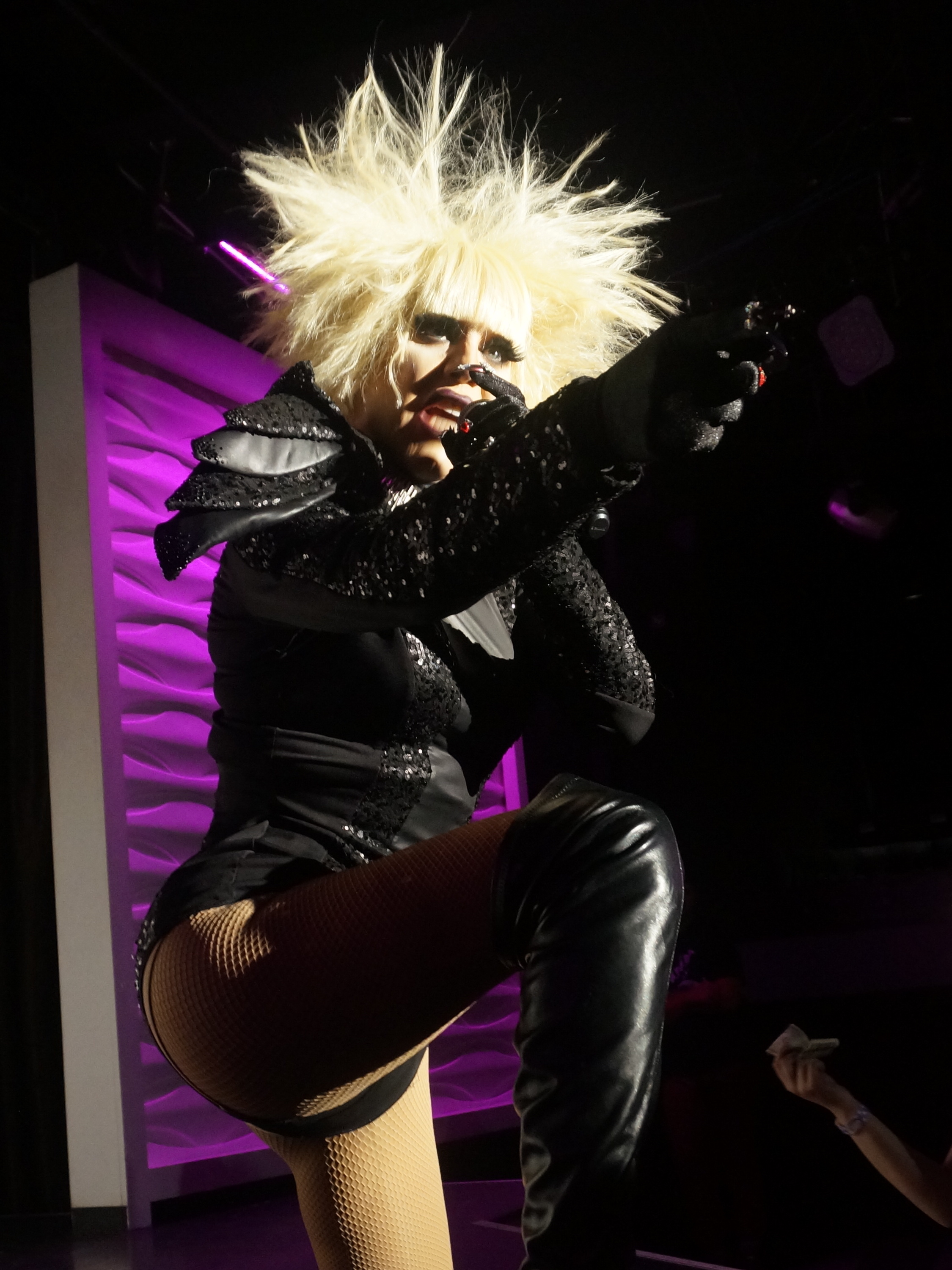
The episode sees Sharon Needles (pictured) crowned the season's winner.

The contestants return for the live grand finale at the El Portal Theater in Los Angeles. Michelle Visage introduces RuPaul, who initially appears via satellite before entering the main stage. RuPaul catches up with all the eliminated contestants, starting with Alisa Summers, Lashauwn Beyond, The Princess, and Madame LaQueer. RuPaul gives the group an opportunity to "read" (or playfully insult) fellow contestants.

RuPaul then interviews Milan, Jiggly Caliente, DiDa Ritz (and her mother in the audience), and Kenya Michaels. RuPaul invites "special translator" Charo to the stage to translate English and Spanish for Kenya Michaels. With assistance from members of the Pit Crew, RuPaul invites out Willam, who reveals that she invited over her husband to her hotel, which is a violation of the competition's rules. RuPaul then interviews Latrice Royale.

RuPaul interviews the three finalists. Sharon Needles, Chad Michaels, Jiggly Caliente, and Willam explain why they had issues with Phi Phi O'Hara's behavior. Members of the Pit Crew help RuPaul crown Latrice Royale as the season's Miss Congeniality. RuPaul also speaks with Chad Michaels's partner Adam. Sharon Needles's mother Joan and partner Alaska Thunderfuck, and Phi Phi O'Hara's mother. Before announcing the winner, judges Visage, Billy B, and Santino Rice offer final comments. RuPaul declares Sharon Needles the season's winner, making Chad Michaels and Phi Phi O'Hara the runners-up.

== Production and broadcast ==
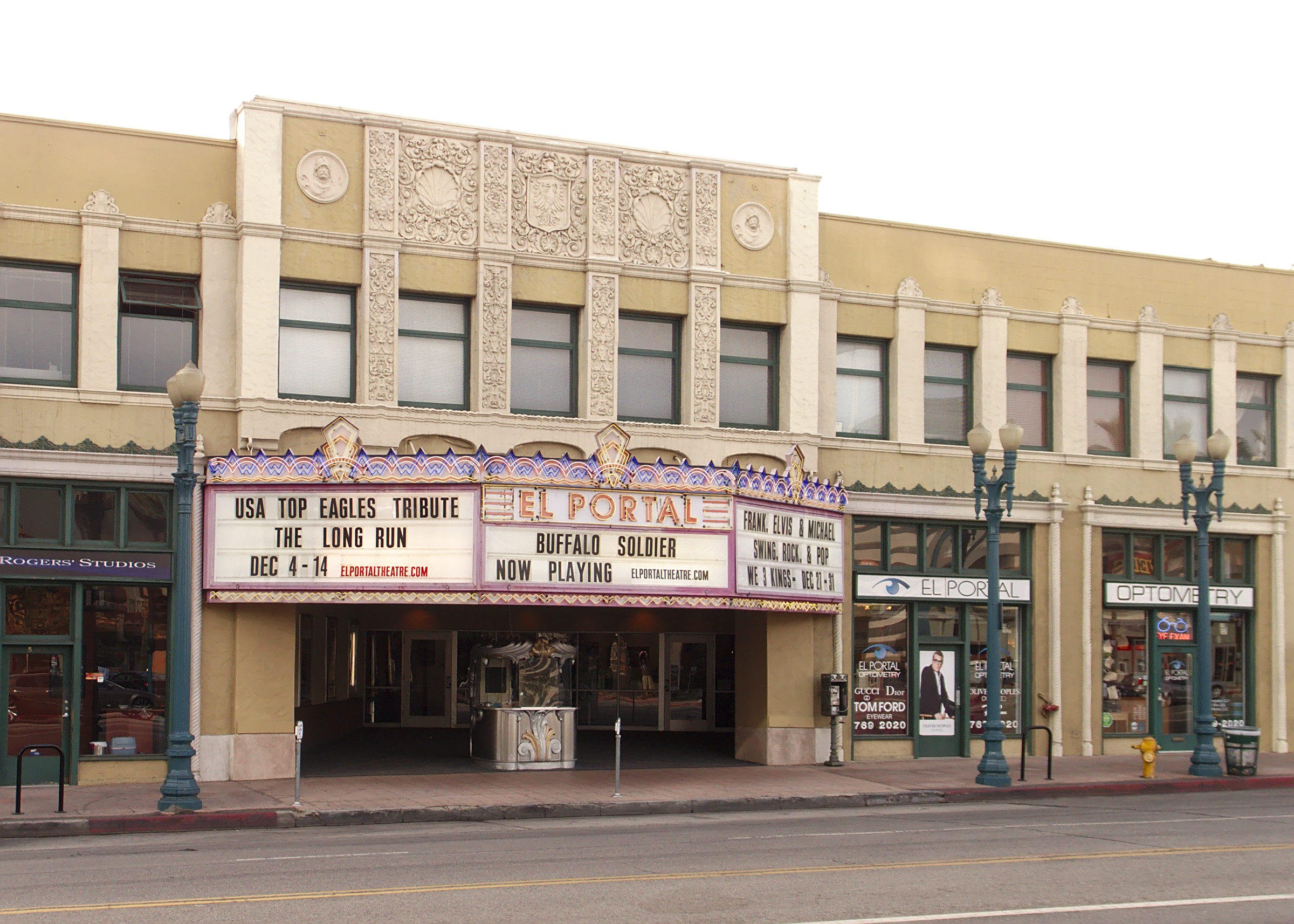
The episode was filmed at El Portal Theater (exterior pictured in 2014) in Los Angeles, California.

The episode originally aired on April 30, 2012. There are many former contestants in the audience, including Carmen Carrera, Morgan McMichaels, and Victoria "Porkchop" Parker, who gets a shout out from the host. Other audience members include Candis Cayne and Lady Bunny. Shawn Morales is among members of the Pit Crew. After being crowned the winner, Sharon Needles says, "Happy Halloween, everybody."

All three finalists were filmed winning, in order to avoid spoilers. The finalists attended a viewing party for the finale at the nightclub XL in New York City. Willam later spoke out about the disqualification.

=== Fashion ===
RuPaul wears a red dress with a matching fascinator and a blonde wig. For the opening number, Alisa Summers has a short black dress with matching boots. Lashauwn Beyond has a black outfit with a headpiece. The Princess has a black dress and a short blonde wig. Madame LaQueer has a black outfit with toile and a brown Wig. Jiggly Caliente wears a short dress and large earrings. She also sucks on a lollipop. DiDa Ritz has a short skirt with an animal print, gold jewelry, and a red wig. Kenya Michaels has a black dress and a dark wig. Latrice Royale wears a long black dress with feathers, a matching fascinator, and a red wig. Chad Michaels has a short gold dress with matching leggings and a blonde wig. Sharon Needles resembles a mug of beer. Phi Phi O'Hara has a showgirl-inspired gold outfit with a matching headpiece and a red wig.

For her interview, Willam wears a short tan dress with black stars and a long blonde wig. For the interview with RuPaul, Chad Michaels has a long dress and a long brown wig. Phi Phi O'Hara wears a short pink outfit with matching gloves and a large blonde wig. Sharon Needles wears a long green lace dress and a wig that is half black and half blonde.

== Reception ==
Oliver Sava of The A.V. Club gave the episode a rating of 'A'.
