= The Final Three =

2012 episode of RuPaul's Drag Race

- RuPaul's Drag Race episode
- Episode no.: Season 4 Episode 13
- Presented by: RuPaul
- Original air date: April 23, 2012

Guest appearances
- Candis Cayne (guest choreographer); Mathu Andersen (guest director); Raja; Tyra Sanchez

Episode chronology
← Previous "RuPaul Rewind"	Next → "Reunion"
- RuPaul's Drag Race (season 4)

"The Final Three" is the thirteenth episode of the fourth season of the American television series RuPaul's Drag Race. It originally aired on April 23, 2012. The episode's main challenge tasks the three finalists with performing in a music video for RuPaul's song "Glamazon" and acting in a separate dramatic scene. American actress Candis Cayne and Australian artist Mathu Andersen are the guest choreographer and director, respectively. Tyra Sanchez and Raja, the winners of the show's second and third seasons, respectively, also make guest appearances. While the episode has a lip-sync contest between the finalists, the winner is not revealed until the reunion episode.

== Episode ==
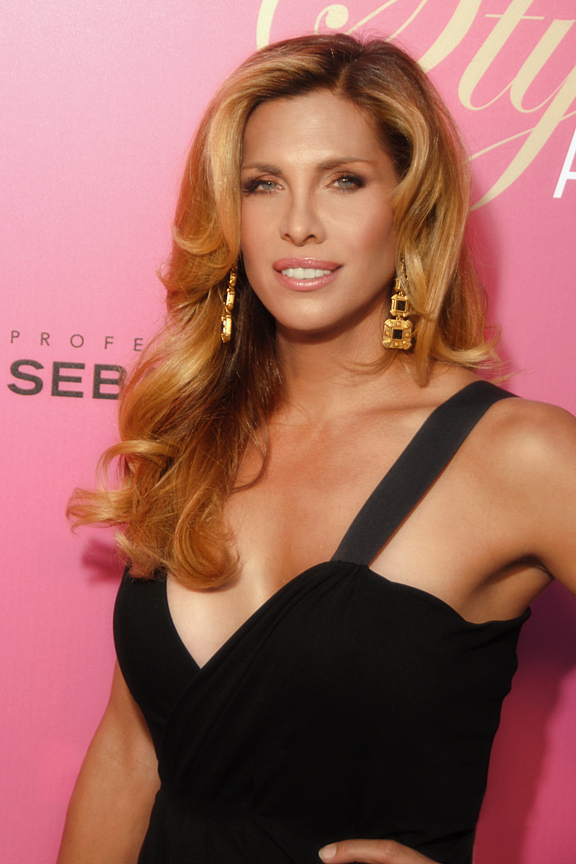
Candis Cayne (pictured in 2009) is a guest choreographer.

The three finalists return to the workroom and read Latrice Royale's message on the mirror. RuPaul greets the group and reveals the season's final main challenge, which tasks the contestants with performing in a music video for RuPaul's song "Glamazon", with assistance from guest director Mathu Andersen and guest choreographer Candis Cayne. The contestants rehearse choreography with Cayne, then film the music video with Andersen.

The contestants meet with former winners Tyra Sanchez and Raja, and have separate individual conversations with RuPaul. Back in the workroom, Chad Michaels apologizes for calling Phi Phi O'Hara immature. The contestants then film dramatic scenes with RuPaul. On elimination day, the contestants make final preparations for the fashion show.

On the main stage, RuPaul welcomes fellow judges Michelle Visage and Santino Rice. RuPaul shares the assignment of the main challenge, then the fashion show commences. After the contestants present their looks, the judges watch the dramatic scene and the music video. The judges deliver their critiques, deliberate, then share the results with the contestants. RuPaul asks all three finalists to participate in a lip-sync contest to "Glamazon". RuPaul says that the winner will be announced during the reunion.

== Production and broadcast ==
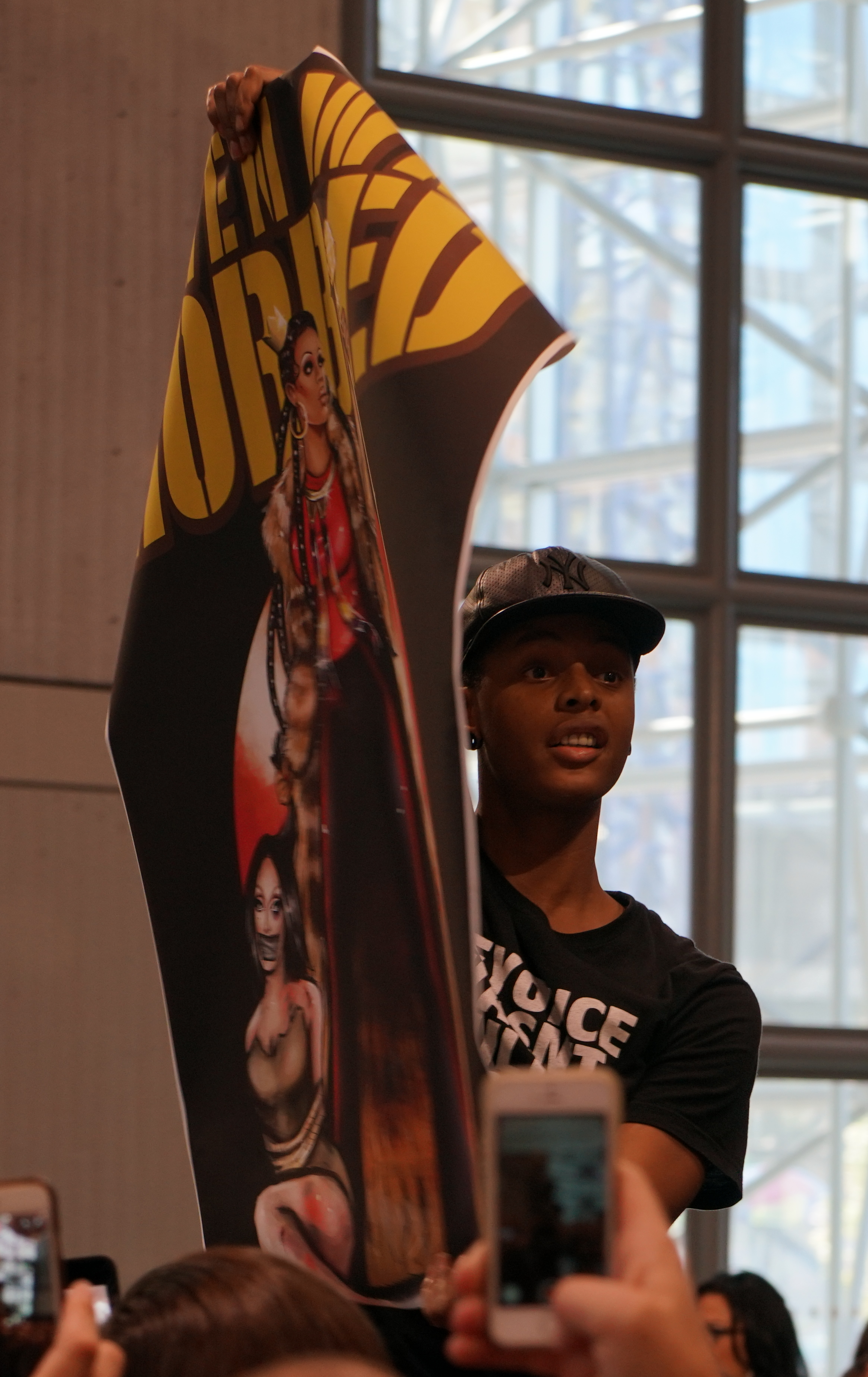
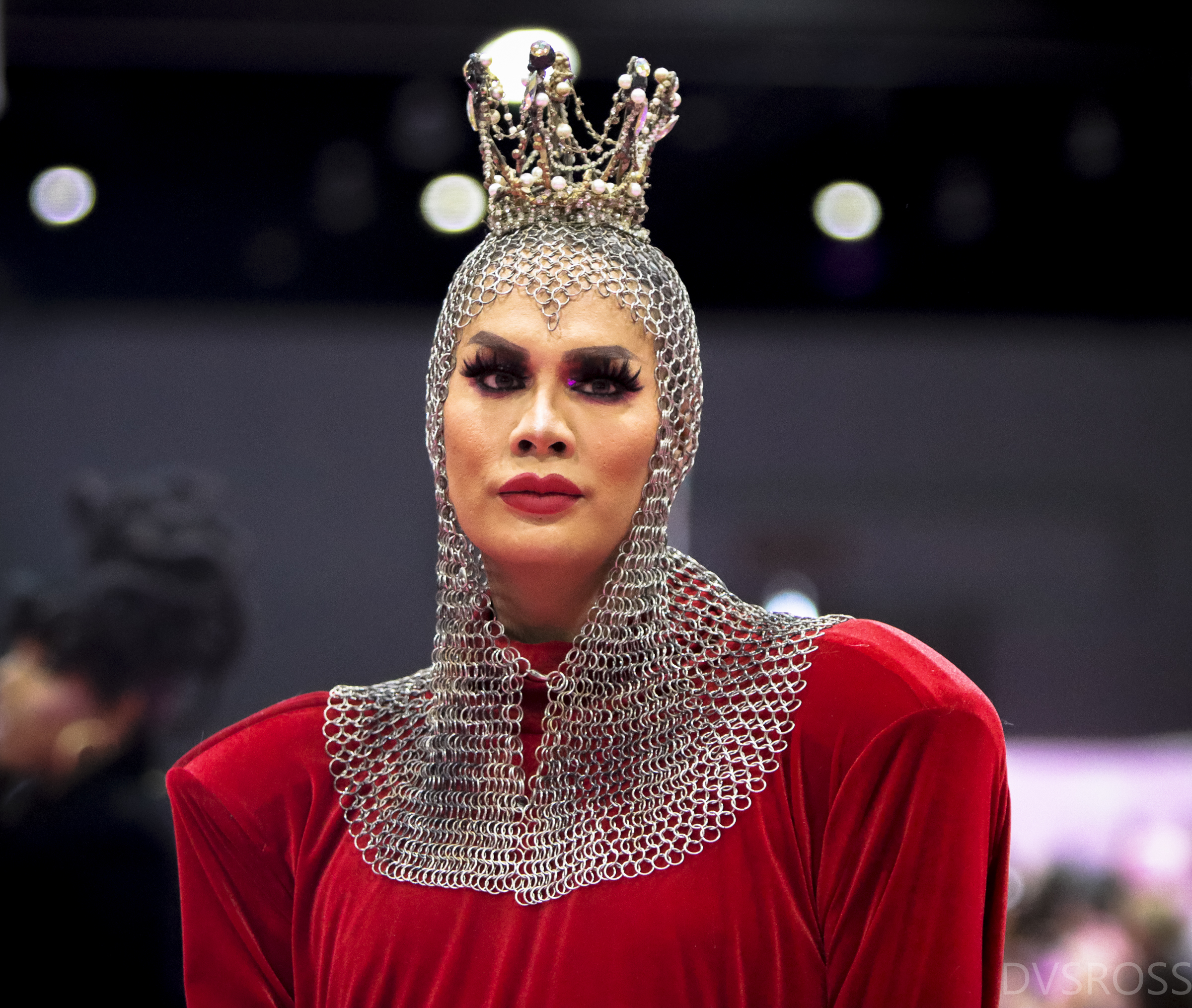
Tyra Sanchez (left, pictured at RuPaul's DragCon NYC in 2017) and Raja (right, pictured at RuPaul's DragCon LA in 2022) make guest appearances.

The episode originally aired on April 23, 2012.

=== Fashion ===
For the music video, the finalists wear similar outfits of different colors. Chad Michaels, Phi Phi O'Hara, and Sharon Needles wear orange, red, and blue, respectively. During the dramatic scene, RuPaul has a black outfit with purple boots and matching tights. Chad Michaels wears a pink dress and a large blonde wig. Phi Phi O'Hara has a short black dress and a red wig. Sharon Needles wears a short brown dress and a short blonde wig.

For the main stage, RuPaul wears a yellow dress with black polka dots, as well as a blonde wig and a black fascinator. Chad Michaels has a Versace-inspired black-and-gold outfit with many straps and a blonde wig. Sharon Needles wears a black-and-tan outfit with black lace tights. She also has tentacles as fingers and a blonde wig. Phi Phi O'Hara wears a bodysuit with black-and-pink animal print and a large brown wig.

== Reception ==
Billy Nilles of E! Online said Sharon Needles's performance in the main challenge "proved she was also capable of melding her unique vision with Mama Ru's eleganza approach to drag". Sam Brooks ranked the "Glamazon" performance number 49 in The Spinoff's 2019 "definitive ranking" of the show's 162 lip-sync contests to date.
