= List of Juliette Lewis performances =

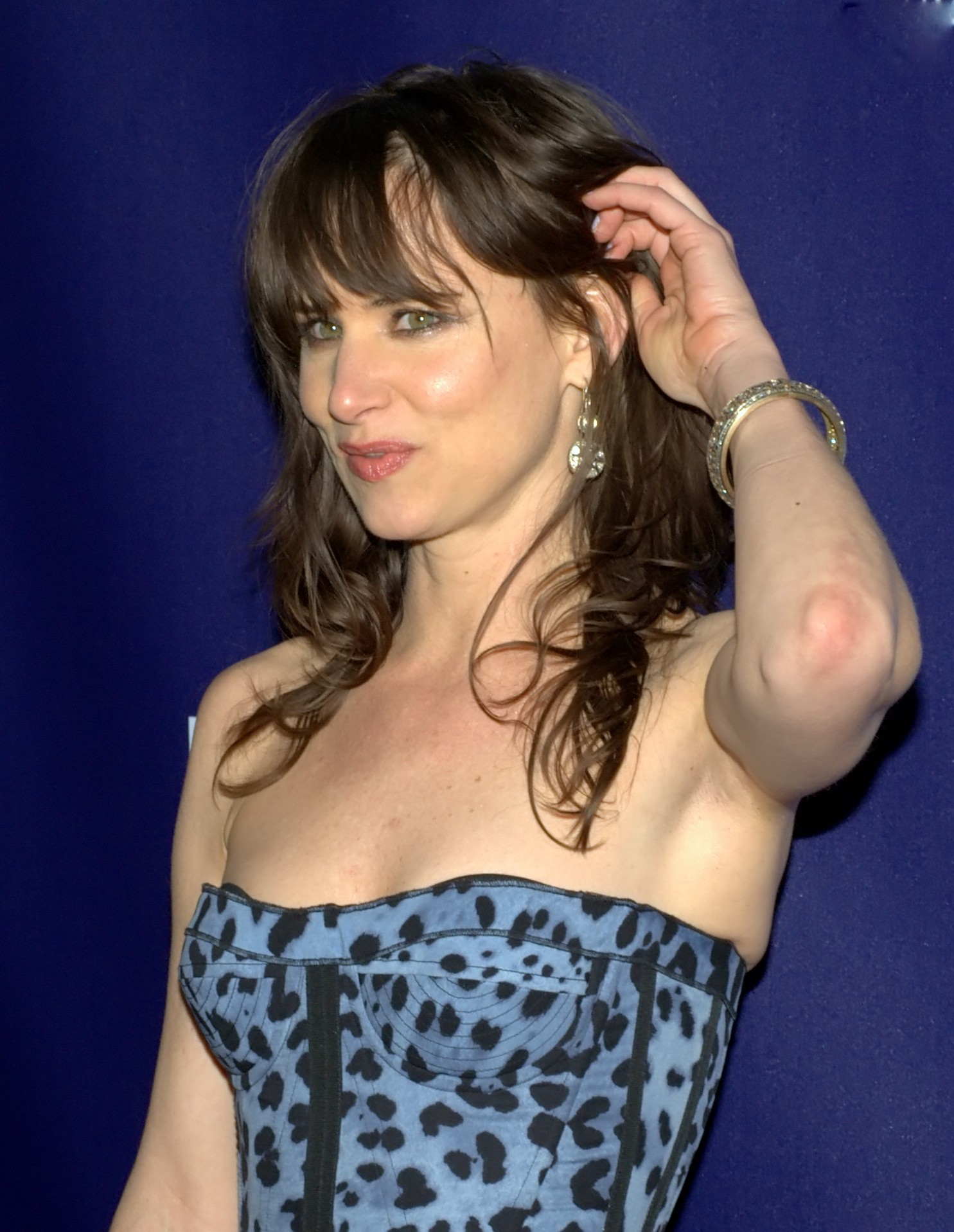
Lewis at the 2010 Tribeca Film Festival

Juliette Lewis is an American actress who came to prominence in the early 1990s after appearing in numerous independent and mainstream films. After appearing in National Lampoon's Christmas Vacation (1989), she garnered widespread fame for her performance in Martin Scorsese's Cape Fear (1991), which earned her Academy Award and Golden Globe Award nominations for Best Supporting Actress.

She followed this with a supporting role in Woody Allen's Husbands and Wives (1992), the thriller Kalifornia, and drama What's Eating Gilbert Grape (the latter two both released in 1993). She gained further notice for her role as murderous woman Mallory Knox in Oliver Stone's controversial satirical crime film Natural Born Killers (1994). Lewis subsequently starred in Kathryn Bigelow's science fiction film Strange Days (1995), playing a musician, and appeared as a teenager in Robert Rodriguez's vampire film From Dusk till Dawn (1996). In 1999, Lewis had a leading role as a mentally-disabled woman in the drama The Other Sister.

The 2000s saw Lewis appearing in a series of supporting roles in independent features as well as studio films, and in 2003 she earned an Emmy nomination for Outstanding Supporting Actress for her role in the television film Hysterical Blindness (2002). She went on to appear in supporting parts in such comedies as Todd Phillips's Old School (2003) and Starsky & Hutch (2004). Subsequent film roles include the sports comedy Whip It (2009), the biographical crime film Conviction (2010), and the drama August: Osage County (2013). In the later 2010s, Lewis worked more frequently in television, appearing in lead roles on the series The Firm (2012), Wayward Pines (2015), Secrets and Lies (2015–2016), and The Act (2019).

== Film ==
Key
†	Denotes films that have not yet been released

Year	Title	Role	Notes	Ref.
1988	My Stepmother Is an Alien	Lexie		
1989	National Lampoon's Christmas Vacation	Audrey Griswold		
1989	Meet the Hollowheads	Cindy Hollowhead		
1989	The Runnin' Kind	Amy Curtis		
1991	Cape Fear	Danielle Bowden		
1991	Crooked Hearts	Cassie		
1992	Husbands and Wives	Rain		
1992	That Night	Sheryl O'Connor		
1993	What's Eating Gilbert Grape	Becky		
1993	Romeo Is Bleeding	Sheri		
1993	Kalifornia	Adele Corners		
1994	Natural Born Killers	Mallory Knox		
1994	Mixed Nuts	Gracie Barzini		
1995	Strange Days	Faith Justin		
1995	The Basketball Diaries	Diane Moody		
1996	The Evening Star	Melanie Horton		
1996	From Dusk till Dawn	Katherine Fuller		
1998	Some Girl	April		
1999	The Other Sister	Carla Tate		
1999	The 4th Floor	Jane Emelin		
2000	Room to Rent	Linda		
2000	The Way of the Gun	Robin		
2001	Picture Claire	Claire Beaucage		
2001	Gaudi Afternoon	April		
2002	Enough	Ginny		
2002	Armitage: Dual Matrix	Naomi Armitage	English dub	
2003	Cold Creek Manor	Ruby Ferguson		
2003	Old School	Heidi		
2004	Blueberry (aka Renegade)	Maria Sullivan		
2004	Starsky & Hutch	Kitty		
2005	Daltry Calhoun	Flora Flick		
2005	Aurora Borealis	Kate		
2005	Grilled	Suzanne		
2006	The Darwin Awards	Joleen		
2007	Catch and Release	Maureen		
2009	Whip It!	Iron Maven		
2009	Metropia	Nina	Voice	
2010	Sympathy for Delicious	Ariel Lee		
2010	The Switch	Debbie Epstein		
2010	Conviction	Roseanna Perry		
2010	Due Date	Heidi		
2011	Hick	Tammy Cutter-McMullen		
2011	Foreverland	Vicky		
2012	Open Road	Jill		
2013	August: Osage County	Karen Weston		
2014	Hellion	Pam		
2014	Kelly & Cal	Kelly		
2015	Jem and the Holograms	Erica Raymond		
2016	Nerve	Nancy Delmonico		
2018	Back Roads	Bonnie Altmyer		
2018	A Million Little Pieces	Joanne		
2019	Ma	Erica Thompson		
2019	Dreamland	The Countess		
2021	Music	Evelyn		
2021	Mayday	June/Bathroom Attendant		
2021	Breaking News in Yuba County	Gloria Michaels		
2024	The Thicket	Cut Throat Bill		
2025	By Design	Camille		
2025	Opus	Clara Armstrong		
2026	Over Your Dead Body	Allegra Weaver		
2026	DreamQuil	Nurse Chapman		

== Television ==
Year	Title	Role	Notes	Ref.
1987	Home Fires	Maty	Television film	
1987–1988	I Married Dora	Katie Ferrell	13 episodes	
1988	The Facts of Life	Terry Rankin	2 episodes	
1989–1990	The Wonder Years	Delores	4 episodes	
1990	Too Young to Die?	Amanda Sue Bradley	Television film	
1990	A Family for Joe	Holly Bankston	8 episodes	
2001	My Louisiana Sky	Dorie Kay	Television film	
2001	Dharma & Greg	September	Episode: "Try to Remember This Kind of September"	
2002	Hysterical Blindness	Beth Toczynski	Television film	
2003	Free for All	Paula Wisconsin (voice)	7 episodes	
2004	Chasing Freedom	Libby	Television film	
2006	My Name Is Earl	Jessie	Episode: "The Bounty Hunter"	
2010	Memphis Beat	Cleo	Episode: "Baby, Let's Play House"	
2012	The Firm	Tamara Inez "Tammy" Hemphill	19 episodes	
2015	Wayward Pines	Beverly Brown	3 episodes	
2015–2016	Secrets and Lies	Detective Andrea Cornell	20 episodes	
2017	Graves	Bailey Todd	2 episodes	
2018	Camping	Jandice	8 episodes	
2018–2019	The Conners	Blue	3 episodes	
2019	At Home with Amy Sedaris	Tandy Tucker	Episode: "Hospital-tality"	
2019	The Act	Kathy Godejohn	Episode: "Bonnie & Clyde"	
2020	Sacred Lies	Harper	10 episodes	
2020	I Know This Much Is True	Nedra Frank	2 episodes	
2020	Filthy Rich	Juliette	3 episodes	
2021–2023	Yellowjackets	Adult Natalie Scatorccio	19 episodes	
2022	Queer as Folk	Judy	6 episodes	
2022	Welcome to Chippendales	Denise	6 episodes	
2023	I'm a Virgo	Justin (voice)	4 episodes	
2024	It's Florida, Man	Kim	Episode: "Bunnies"	
2026	Cape Fear	Crystal Cady	5 episodes	

== Music videos ==
Year	Song	Artist	Notes	Ref.
1993	"Come to My Window"	Melissa Etheridge	Directed by Samuel Bayer	
2003	"Buried Alive By Love"	HIM		
2013	"City of Angels"	Thirty Seconds to Mars		
2013	"Prisoner"	Har Mar Superstar	Directed by Matt Powers	

== Video games ==
Year	Show	Role	Notes	Ref.
2008	Grand Theft Auto IV	Herself as a radio DJ		

== See also ==
- List of awards and nominations received by Juliette Lewis
