= Monica Beverly Hillz =

American drag performer and transgender activist

- Born: 1985 (age 40–41); Chicago, Illinois, U.S.
- Other name: Monica Dejesus-Anaya
- Occupation: Drag queen
- Known for: RuPaul's Drag Race (season 5) RuPaul's Drag Race All Stars (season 8)

Monica Dejesus-Anaya, known by the stage persona Monica Beverly Hillz, is an American drag queen, reality television personality, and transgender activist best known for appearing on the fifth season of RuPaul's Drag Race in 2013, as well as for returning in 2023 on the eighth season of RuPaul's Drag Race: All Stars. She was the second contestant in the show's history to come out as a transgender woman, on the show, after Kylie Sonique Love of season 2 (who came-out during the show's reunion special). Hillz came-out during the judges' critiques for that episode's main challenge; her coming-out was especially historic, as it was a first for network television or a reality competition show.

In 2014, after her run on season five of Drag Race, she was included by the Windy City Times on their list of "30 Under 30" for individuals displaying the "best LGBTQIA activism, business, culture, non-profit work and more". Bustle named her one of the "most popular" RPDR alum. In 2015, she performed at the MTV Video Music Awards with Miley Cyrus for her live performance of "Dooo It!", along with a cast of other well-known drag queens and RPDR alum.

== Biography ==
Dejesus-Anaya is of Afro-Puerto Rican-American descent. After the age of four, she was raised by her maternal aunt, Gladys, in Chicago's Latino Northwest Side. She is cousins with Rimanelli "Rima" Mellal from Bad Girls Club season 9.

She began performing in professional dance groups at the age of 13. While in school, she was the victim of physical violence and bullying, with other students kicking, punching, and slapping her for simply being herself; due to the struggles with her peers, she attempted suicide as a high school sophomore, and subsequently dropped-out of school. Her Aunt Gladys died when Dejesus-Anaya was 15, leaving five children behind. At that point, Dejesus-Anaya moved back in with her mother. In Chicago, Dejesus-Anaya started performing at Latino gay clubs before deciding to move to Kentucky, where she became a performer at Owensboro's only gay bar. She struggled for a time with poverty, compounding issues she faced while as an adolescent and young adult.

At age 17, Dejesus-Anaya attended her first drag show, stating that she "loved it". After deciding to perform in drag herself, Dejesus-Anaya chose the name "Monica" as a tribute to the Bollywood actress Monica, and adding "Beverly Hills" after the area in Los Angeles where she hoped to one day live. She originally went only by "Monica Beverly" in Chicago, but added the "Hills" as a surname when she moved to Kentucky; she eventually replaced the "s" in "Hills" with a "z" for "Latin spice". Dejesus-Anaya considers her look in drag to be a mix of Aaliyah and Faith Evans. She has stated she is inspired by fellow trans women such as Drag Race alum Carmen Carrera, the iconic Amanda Lepore, Calpernia Addams, and Maria Roman.

While living in Kentucky, Dejesus-Anaya worked at Macy's for a year and nine months, where she experienced discrimination from certain individuals. In Illinois, she worked as an escort while using narcotics, during which time she stated she was robbed and sexually assaulted. Due to the experiences while working as an escort, she has dealt with sleep issues and nightmares.

Hillz had her name legally changed sometime around 2021. In August 2023, she revealed that she was dating Josh Seiter, a previous contestant on the eleventh season of The Bachelorette. The two eventually separated, on August 22, after only three weeks of dating. Less than a week later, Seiter was falsely reported dead, of which Monica believes was Seiter's own doing out of internal shame.

== Career ==
=== RuPaul's Drag Race ===
In 2013, Dejesus-Anaya was a contestant on the fifth season of the American television reality competition RuPaul's Drag Race. Previously, she had auditioned for season 1 and season 3. During the show, it was widely commented that she seemed "excessively distracted". The reason became clear when during the show she came out as transgender during the elimination portion of episode 2 in which she fell into the bottom two. Speaking to the judges, she stated, "I feel I'm not here. I've just been holding a secret in and trying so hard. I'm not just a drag queen – I'm a transgendered woman." The producers have stated that the reveal was not a contrived part of the show; they found out about her identifying as transgender during the filming of the episode. Guest judges Kristen Johnston and Juliette Lewis both responded with supportive statements. As producer Tom Campbell stated, "We discovered at the same time as everyone else. It was not revealed at any time during the casting process and everyone learned about it at the same time." Fellow competitor and eventual season winner Jinkx Monsoon called Dejesus-Anaya her "hero" during the announcement. By this, she became the first “out” transgender person to publicly identify as such while competing on the show, and although fellow transgender alumni Kylie Sonique Love, Carmen Carrera, Stacy Layne Matthews, Kenya Michaels, Jiggly Caliente, and Lashauwn Beyond had competed before her, they all came out publicly as transgender after their runs on the show.

While distracted, Dejesus-Anaya did well in week 1. RuPaul commented that Dejesus-Anaya looked like Lady Miss Kier, with L'Etoile Magazine calling her face "fabulous". In week 2, she fell into the bottom two against Serena ChaCha, with the two of them lipsyncing to Rihanna's "Only Girl in the World". Dejesus-Anaya won the lipsync battle, with Serena ChaCha being sent home. The following week, Dejesus-Anaya was the third contestant eliminated on the show when she again fell into the bottom two and competed against contestant Coco Montrese.

Monica Beverly Hillz later competed on the eighth season of RuPaul's Drag Race All Stars (2023). In the first episode, she placed in the bottom alongside Darienne Lake. The winner of the week's challenge, Kahanna Montrese, then lost a lip-sync of Beyoncé’s "Freakum Dress" to the "lip-sync assassin" of the week, Aja. Aja revealed which of the two queens in the bottom had been voted to be eliminated by the majority of the safe queens, which was Monica, making her the first boot of the season. She was subsequently the first-ever queen to be entered in the "Fame Games" twist, where eliminated queens would show their unaired runway looks with hopes of being voted "Queen of the Fame Games" by fans, winning a prize of $50,000 (later upped to $60,000). Monica Beverly Hillz's performance of her original song "Not a Soul Can Clock" during the 11th episode went viral.

=== Post-RuPaul's Drag Race ===
Dejesus-Anaya joined the Chicago-based gay Feast of Fun podcast in 2013.

In December 2014, Dejesus-Anaya was one of the subjects of a photo series called WERKS, shot by Nestor Photography. The show was held at Chicago designer Michelle Tan's boutique Michelle Tan Clothing. Other drag queens featured in the series included RPDR alum Gia Gunn (season 6), DiDa Ritz (season 4), and Jade Jolie (season 5).

In 2015, Dejesus-Anaya joined other drag queens to film the music video for singer Glenn Stewart's cover of "(Here it Comes) Around Again", originally performed by RuPaul. Other drag queens who joined for the video included RPDR alum JujuBee (season 2), Kelly Mantle (season 6), Jade Sotomayor (season 1), Jade Jolie (season 5), Joslyn Fox (season 6), and Jaidynn Diore Fierce (season 7). In 2015, Puerto Rican gay scholar Lawrence La Fountain-Stokes presented a talk titled "The Drag of Poverty" in which he discussed Dejesus-Anaya's experiences in relation to those of other Puerto Rican performers, namely Erika Lopez and Holly Woodlawn. The talk is part of a book project La Fountain-Stokes is working on called Translocas: Trans Diasporic Puerto Rican Drag.

Dejesus-Anaya has continued to perform and make appearances up through 2015, including RuPaul's first Drag Con, held May 16–17, 2015, at the Los Angeles Convention Center.

After her first appearance on Drag Race, in around 2021, she nearly quit drag entirely with the goal of making time for her mental health after years of traveling and publicity as a result of her fame. However, after personal introspection brought upon by her quarantine during the COVID-19 pandemic, she decided not to quit drag.

=== Activism ===
In 2013, American actress Amanda Bynes insulted RuPaul on Twitter, tweeting, "My dad is as ugly as RuPaul! So thankful I look nothing like you both! I had nose surgery after my mug shots so my nose and I are gorgeous!" Dejesus-Anaya came to RuPaul's defense, telling Bynes to "clean herself up" and "get a better wig".

In 2014, Dejesus-Anaya and Carmen Carrera, another trans former RPDR contestant, both spoke out against the perceived transphobic language that was included on RPDR. The phrases included "she-male" and "tranny", which Dejesus-Anaya stated "were not cute at all".

In 2015, when unconfirmed rumors began circulating that Caitlyn Jenner was undergoing a gender transition, In Touch Weekly released a cover with a male-presenting Caitlyn in photoshopped makeup. The cover was widely criticized, and Dejesus-Anaya released a statement saying "I think it's so wrong in so many ways for them to poke fun and do such things to someone... They know nothing about just to make money and make a mockery of trans people everywhere. They need to educate instead of just doing nonsense like that."

In 2018, Dejesus-Anaya spoke out against RuPaul for stating that contestants who were in the process of a physical transition would "probably not" be allowed on Drag Race, with Monica retorting back that "I've always been a woman, so what I've done to my body or that I hadn't started hormones while on the show doesn't take away my identity". RuPaul has since let openly transgender competitors such as Gottmik, Kerri Colby, and Sasha Colby compete on the show.

In 2023, after her elimination from Season 8 of RuPaul's Drag Race All Stars, Monica announced that she would be focusing more on her career as an activist rather than her career as a drag queen, but assured her supporters that she will continue to perform as a drag queen and will "always be Monica Beverly Hillz".

== Discography ==
=== Singles ===
==== As lead artist ====
Title	Year	Album
"Not a Soul Can Clock (MBH Is Back)"	2023	Non-album single

==== As featured artist ====
Title	Year	Album
"Money, Success, Fame, Glamour" (Glam Rock version) (with the cast of RuPaul's Drag Race All Stars, season 8)	2023	Non-album single

== Filmography ==
Year	Title	Role
2012	TheQU: Dida Ritz & Monica Beverly Hillz talk Vogue for Tots	Self
2012	I Am Monica: Monica Beverly Hillz Documentary	Self
2013	RuPaul's Drag Race	12th Place (Eliminated in Episode 3)
2013	Rupaul's Drag Race: Untucked!	3 Episodes
2013	SocialScope Interview: Monica Beverly Hillz Gets Personal in New SocialScope Interview	Self
2023	RuPaul's Drag Race All Stars	Herself / Contestant
2023	RuPaul's Drag Race All Stars: Untucked	Herself / Contestant

=== Web series ===
Year	Title	Role	Notes	Ref.
2019	Detailz	Herself	Guest	
2023	Meet the Queens	Herself	Stand-alone special RuPaul's Drag Race All Stars 8	
2023	EW News Flash	Herself	Guest	
2023	BuzzFeed Celeb	Herself	Guest	
