= Jade Jolie =

American drag performer

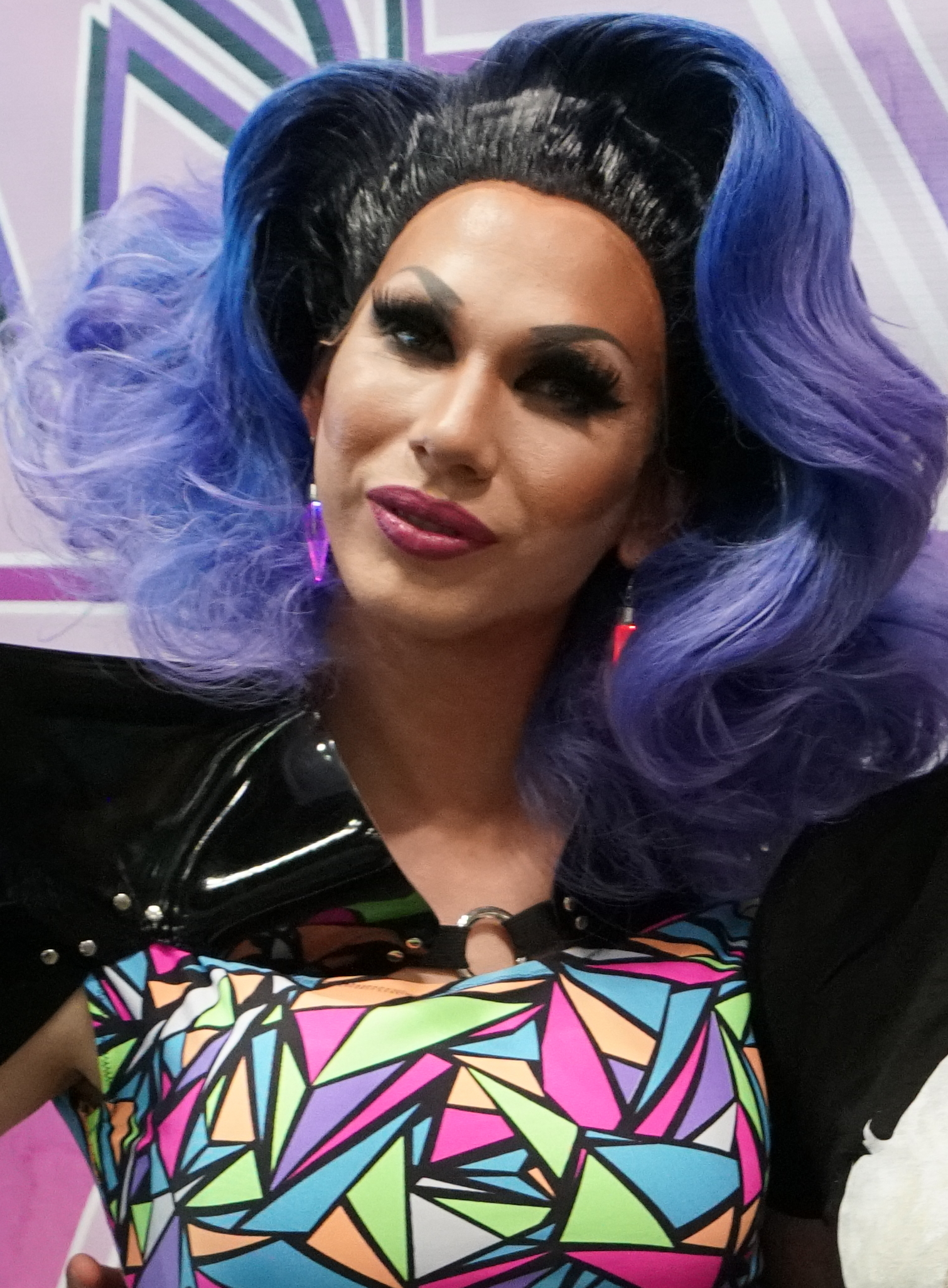
- Jolie in 2017
- Born: November 2, 1986 (age 39); Fort Myers, Florida, U.S.
- Other names: Jules Green
- Occupations: Drag queen, performer, impersonator, actor
- Known for: RuPaul's Drag Race (season 5); The Boulet Brothers' Dragula (season 4); The Boulet Brothers' Dragula: Titans (season 2)

Jade Jolie (born November 2, 1986) is the stage name of Jules Green, an American drag queen and impersonator of Taylor Swift, known for competing in the fifth season of RuPaul's Drag Race, the fourth season of The Boulet Brothers' Dragula, and the second season of The Boulet Brothers' Dragula: Titans.

She featured in Swift's "You Need to Calm Down" music video and joined her at the 2019 MTV Video Music Awards in the opening act, as well as receiving two awards with Swift, including Video of the Year.

== Early life ==
Jolie was born on November 2, 1986, and raised in Fort Myers, Florida and Alachua, Florida. She started doing drag at the University Club in Gainesville, Florida. Her drag mom is Dana Douglas and her drag father is Bob Taylor. The name Jade Jolie is a combination of the Mortal Kombat character Jade and Angelina Jolie. She originally auditioned for season five of Drag Race, where she reached the top eight.

== Career ==
Jolie was announced as one of fourteen contestants for the fifth season of RuPaul's Drag Race in 2013. She placed among the bottom-three in the first episode, but was safe, over Serena ChaCha and Penny Tration. She portrayed singer Taylor Swift for the impersonation challenge, "Snatch Game". Jolie was later eliminated on the sixth episode after losing a lip sync battle of The Pointer Sisters' song "I'm So Excited" against Coco Montrese. Portions of a backstage argument between Jolie and fellow contestant Alyssa Edwards—during an episode of Untucked—became viral internet memes; following several workroom clashes during the day, Jolie and Edwards (with Coco Montrese present) had a heated exchange in the backstage lounge while their fellow competitors were being critiqued by the judges. In addition to telling Edwards "them shoulders should match them hips, but they don't", Jolie infamously commented on Edwards' apparent "back rolls" being on-display "everywhere" earlier in the day, with Edwards' subsequent confessional reaction becoming equally meme-worthy. Jolie appeared as a guest attending the series' eighth season's grand finale.

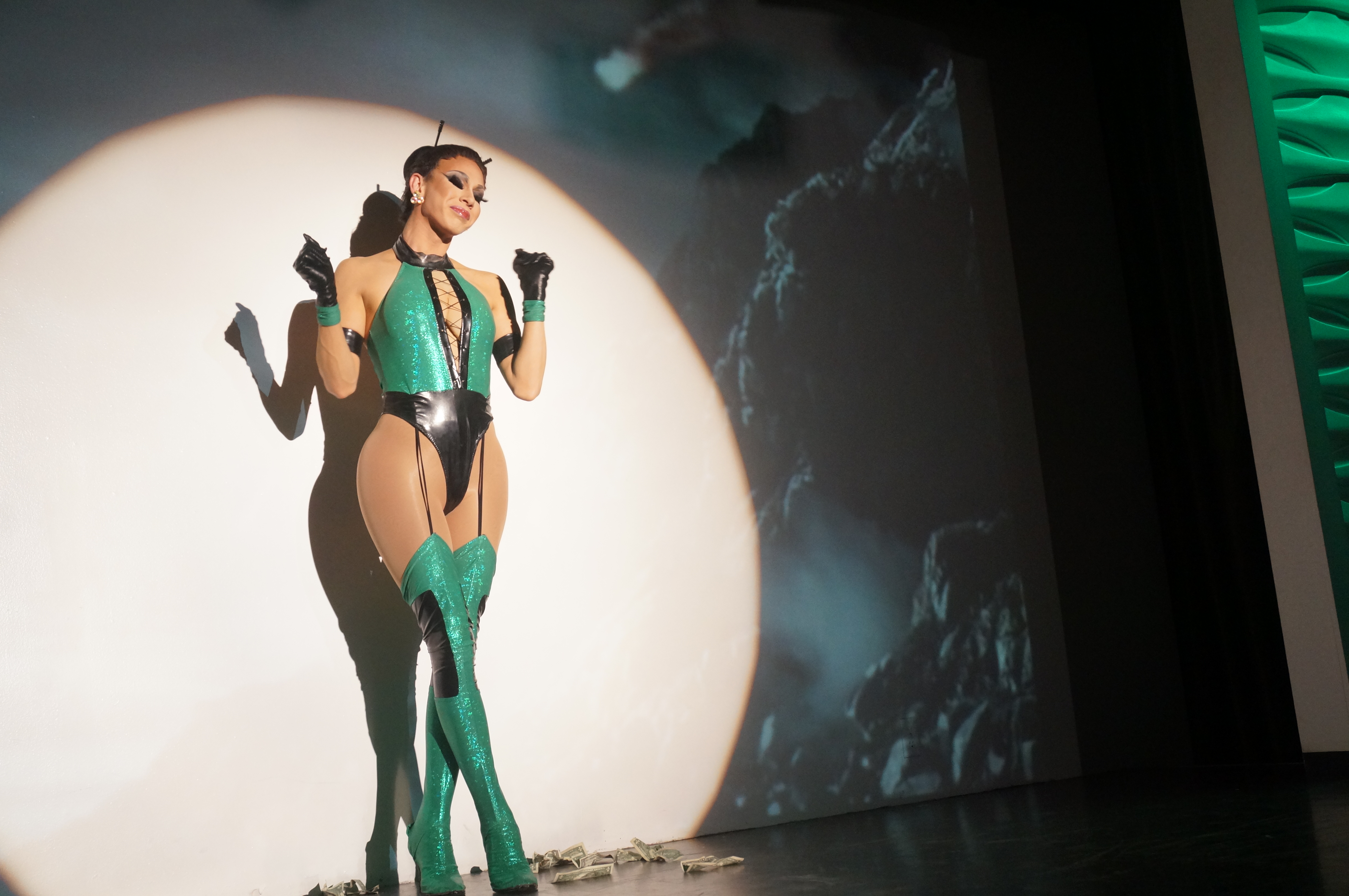
Jade Jolie performing in 2017

After appearing on Drag Race, Jolie was featured in a music video by season two competitor Pandora Boxx, "Knew You Seemed Shady!", released on July 23, 2013. In 2017, Jolie was part of season four contestant Jaremi Carey (formerly Phi Phi O'Hara)'s drag benefit show to raise funds for the victims of Hurricane Maria in Puerto Rico, along with other Drag Race alumni. She was also in the music video for fellow season five queen Alaska's "Snaked", released on December 24, 2018, again portraying Taylor Swift. She played the part of Swift again in the music video for Swift's "You Need to Calm Down", released on June 17, 2019.

On August 26, 2019, Jolie performed alongside Taylor Swift during her 2019 MTV Video Music Awards performance. After Swift won the Video of the Year Award, presenter John Travolta confused Jolie for Swift herself, and attempted to hand her the award.

In September 2021, Jolie was announced as part of the cast of the fourth season of The Boulet Brothers' Dragula, becoming the first Drag Race alum to compete on the show, where she placed sixth.

In October 2021, Jolie performed at Dragathon: Halloween Night Spooktacular.

== Personal life ==
In 2013, Jolie was involved in a Twitter fight with Mimi Imfurst, presumably from the way Imfurst introduced Jolie at Logo's NYC Pride event, which Jolie took offense to. The fight included Imfurst stating Jolie was in prostitution, and Jolie calling Imfurst a "loser". Judge Michelle Visage stepped in to break up the fight. In September 2021, Jolie issued a public apology for portraying a Nazi soldier in a pornographic film years prior. Jade came out as a trans woman on October 8, 2023.

== Filmography ==
=== Film ===
Year	Title	Role	Notes	Ref
2020	Miss Americana	Herself	Cameo	

=== Television ===
Year	Title	Role	Notes	Ref
2013	RuPaul's Drag Race (season 5)	Contestant	8th place (7 episodes)	
2013	RuPaul's Drag Race: Untucked	Contestant	Season 4 (6 episodes)	
2020	AJ and the Queen	Guest	1 episode	
2021	The Boulet Brothers' Dragula season 4	Contestant	6th Place (7 episodes)	
2025	The Boulet Brothers' Dragula: Titans season 2	Contestant	12th Place (5 episodes)	

=== Music videos ===
Year	Title	Artist
2013	"Knew You Seemed Shady!"	Pandora Boxx
2018	"Snaked"	Alaska
2019	"You Need to Calm Down"	Taylor Swift

=== Web series ===
Year	Title	Role	Ref.
2014	Ring My Bell	Herself	
2014	WOW Shopping Network	Herself	
2023	Give It To Me Straight (with Maddy Morphosis)	Herself	
