= Penny Tration =

American drag performer

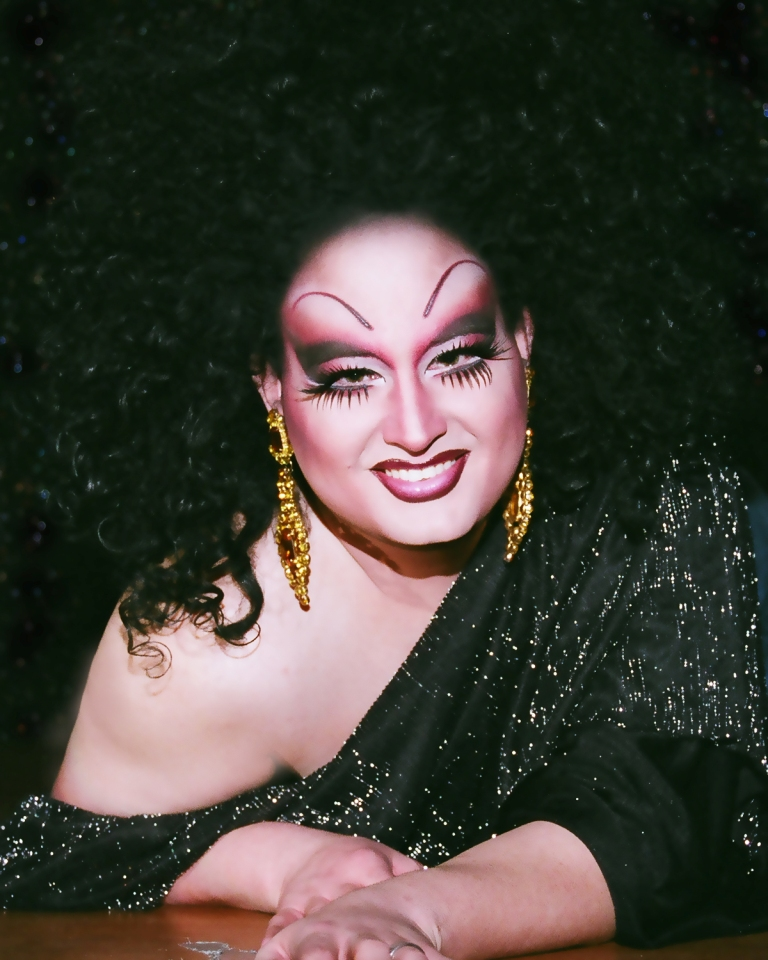
- Penny Tration in 2007
- Born: Anthony Cody
- Occupation: Drag queen
- Television: RuPaul's Drag Race (season 5)

Penny Tration is the stage name of Anthony "Tony" Cody, an American drag queen. Penny Tration competed on season 5 of RuPaul's Drag Race, where she was the first to be eliminated.

== Early life ==
Anthony "Tony" Cody was raised in Los Angeles.

== Career ==
Penny Tration has been described as a "premier" drag performer of Cincinnati. Her original drag name was The Drag Queen Helga. She founded The Cabaret above Below Zero Lounge, and has performed in the annual K-State Drag Show many times.

Penny Tration competed on season 5 of RuPaul's Drag Race. She was the season's oldest contestant, competing at the age of 39. She was voted onto the show by fans and was the first contestant eliminated, placing fourteenth overall. On the first episode ("RuPaullywood or Bust"), she placed in the bottom two of a design challenge and lost a lip sync against Serena ChaCha to "Party in the U.S.A." (2009) by Miley Cyrus, having not learnt the song's lyrics. Penny Tration continues to perform, mostly in Ohio.

Out of drag, Cody has been a waiter and he has made and sold wigs. He was also a product manager for a design firm.

== Personal life ==
Cody is based in Ohio and married.

== See also ==
- List of people from Cincinnati

== Filmography ==
=== Television ===
- RuPaul's Drag Race (season 5)
