= Serena ChaCha =

Panamanian-American drag performer

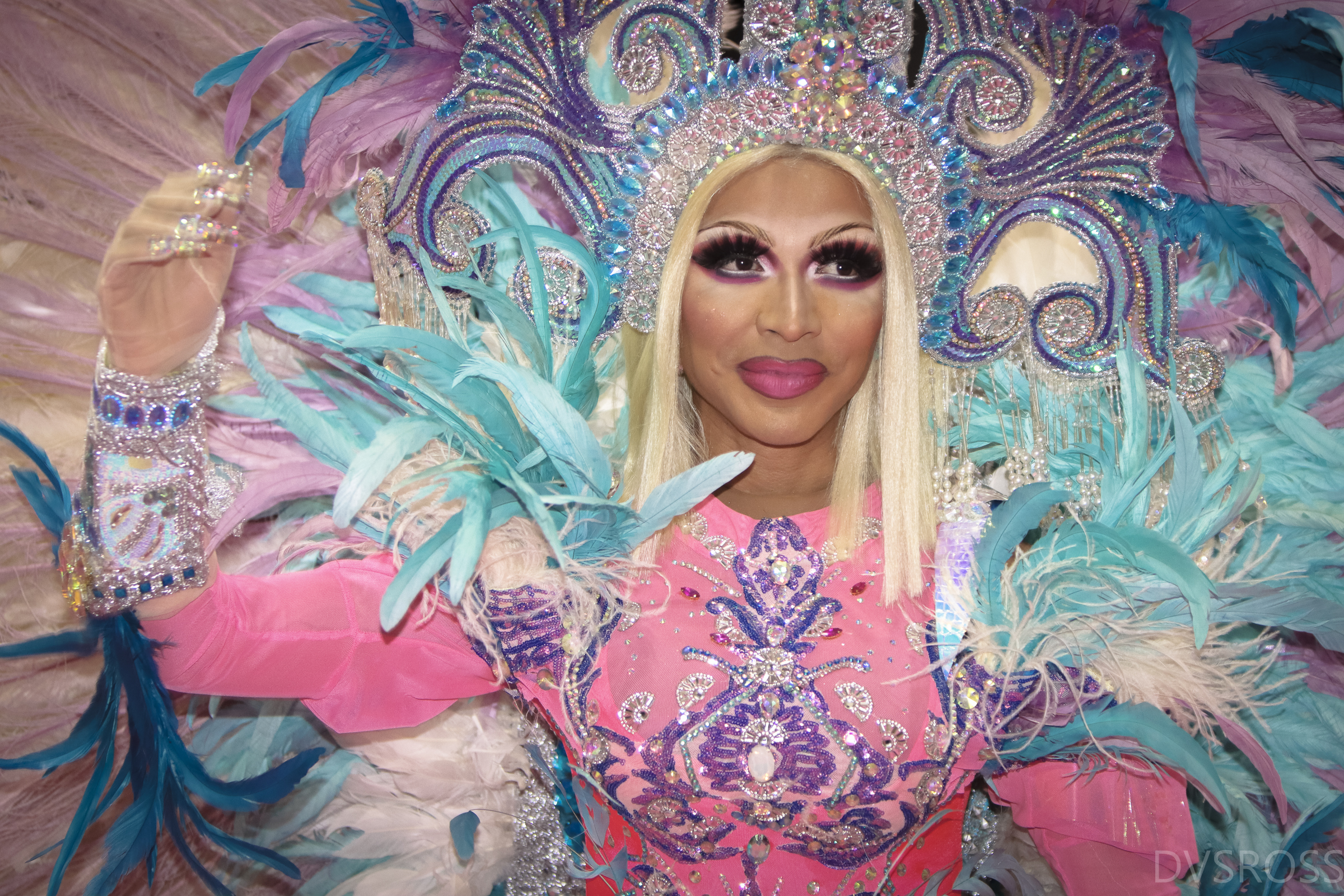
- Serena ChaCha at RuPaul's DragCon LA, 2022
- Born: Myron Arturo Morgan; September 17, 1990 (age 36); La Chorrera, Panamá Oeste, Panama
- Education: Florida State University (BFA)
- Occupation: Drag queen
- Known for: RuPaul's Drag Race (season 5); RuPaul's Drag Race All Stars (season 6)

Myron Arturo Morgan (born 17 September 1990), better known by the stage name Serena ChaCha, is a Panamanian-American drag performer and wigstress, best known for appearing on the fifth season of RuPaul's Drag Race, and on the sixth season of RuPaul's Drag Race: All Stars, placing 13th in both.

== Early life and education ==
Morgan was born and raised in La Chorrera, Panama. Morgan later moved to the United States. He graduated with a BFA from Florida State University in 2012.

== Career ==
Morgan first performed in drag in 2010.

In 2013, ChaCha was announced as one of 14 contestants competing in the fifth season of RuPaul's Drag Race. At 21, she was the youngest contestant. ChaCha was in the bottom two in the first episode, eliminating Penny Tration in a lip-sync to "Party in the U.S.A." by Miley Cyrus; the following episode, she was eliminated by Monica Beverly Hillz following a lip-sync to "Only Girl (In the World)" by Rihanna. Following ChaCha's appearance on the show, she released a single, "Cha Cha".

In 2021, ChaCha was announced as one of the returning drag queens competing in the sixth season of RuPaul's Drag Race: All Stars. At the time, ChaCha was the lowest-placing queen to return for an All Stars season. ChaCha was eliminated in the first episode as a result of a group vote following her talent show performance. She was offered a chance to return to the competition in the tenth episode's 'Game within a Game', but lost in a lip-sync against Jiggly Caliente to "Free Your Mind" by En Vogue.

Outside of drag, Morgan owns Serena ChaCha Wigs, a wig company.

== Personal life ==
Morgan is currently based in Tallahassee, Florida.

== Filmography ==
=== Television ===
Year	Title	Role	Notes
2013	RuPaul's Drag Race	Herself	Season 5 (13th place)
2013	RuPaul's Drag Race: Untucked	Herself	Season 5 (13th place)
2021	RuPaul's Drag Race All Stars	Herself	Season 6 (13th place)
2021	RuPaul's Drag Race All Stars: Untucked	Herself	Season 6 (13th place)
