= April Harris-Holmes =

American singer (born 1967)

April Harris-Holmes (born March 25, 1967) is an American singer and businesswoman from Hawthorne, New Jersey, best known for being in the group Seduction.

== Early life ==
April Harris-Holmes was born in Paterson, New Jersey, to Georgia B. Harris, a caterer. She was raised in Passaic, New Jersey, and attended Passaic High School, where she was selcted as homecoming queen in 1982.

Growing up, Harris was a singer, and realized she could perform in front of a crowd at age 12 when singing "Evergreen" by Barbra Streisand. Her music teacher would take her around the local area to perform, where she sang songs by singers like Billie Holiday and Betty Carter.

Harris went to Howard University in Washington D.C. While at college, Harris was a part of a band who opened for other bands like The Whispers and Atlantic Starr.

== Career ==
After graduating university in 1988, Harris was a part of the original lineup of the girl group Seduction with members Michelle Visage and Idalis DeLeón as a main vocalist. One of the founders of the group, David Cole, was her sister's best friend and lived near them for five years. Cole and Robert Clivillés ran into April at a concert and scouted her due to Cole's connection with her.

in 1989, Seduction released songs like "(You're My One and Only) True Love" (which was recorded by Martha Wash as the group was still finding members) and "Two to Make It Right", with the latter winning a Gold Recording Industry Association of America award.

The group disbanded in 1991, but Harris trademarked the name and revived the group in 2015 with new members Maria Flora and Eunice Foster.

Her mother Georgia's death in 2011 inspired Harris-Holmes to start her business, Keeping You Sweet in 2017. As of 2022, Keeping You Sweet is in 15 locations, including Harlem and Chelsea in New York City, and Wayne, New Jersey.

In 2019, Harris-Holmes won the Girl Scouts Heart of New Jersey cook off.

== Personal life ==
Her inspirations growing up were Holiday, Streisand, and Aretha Franklin.
