= Super Troopers (RuPaul's Drag Race) =

- RuPaul's Drag Race episode
- Episode no.: Season 5 Episode 10
- Presented by: RuPaul
- Original air date: April 8, 2013

Guest appearances
- Clinton Kelly; George Kotsiopoulos

Episode chronology
← Previous "Drama Queens"	Next → "Sugar Ball"
- RuPaul's Drag Race season 5

"Super Troopers" is the tenth episode of the fifth season of the American television series RuPaul's Drag Race. It originally aired on April 8, 2013. The episode's main challenge tasks the contestants with giving makeovers to gay veterans. Clinton Kelly and George Kotsiopoulos are guest judges.

Roxxxy Andrews wins the episode's main challenge. Coco Montrese is eliminated from the competition after placing in the bottom and losing a lip-sync contest against Detox to "Two to Make It Right" by Seduction.

== Episode ==
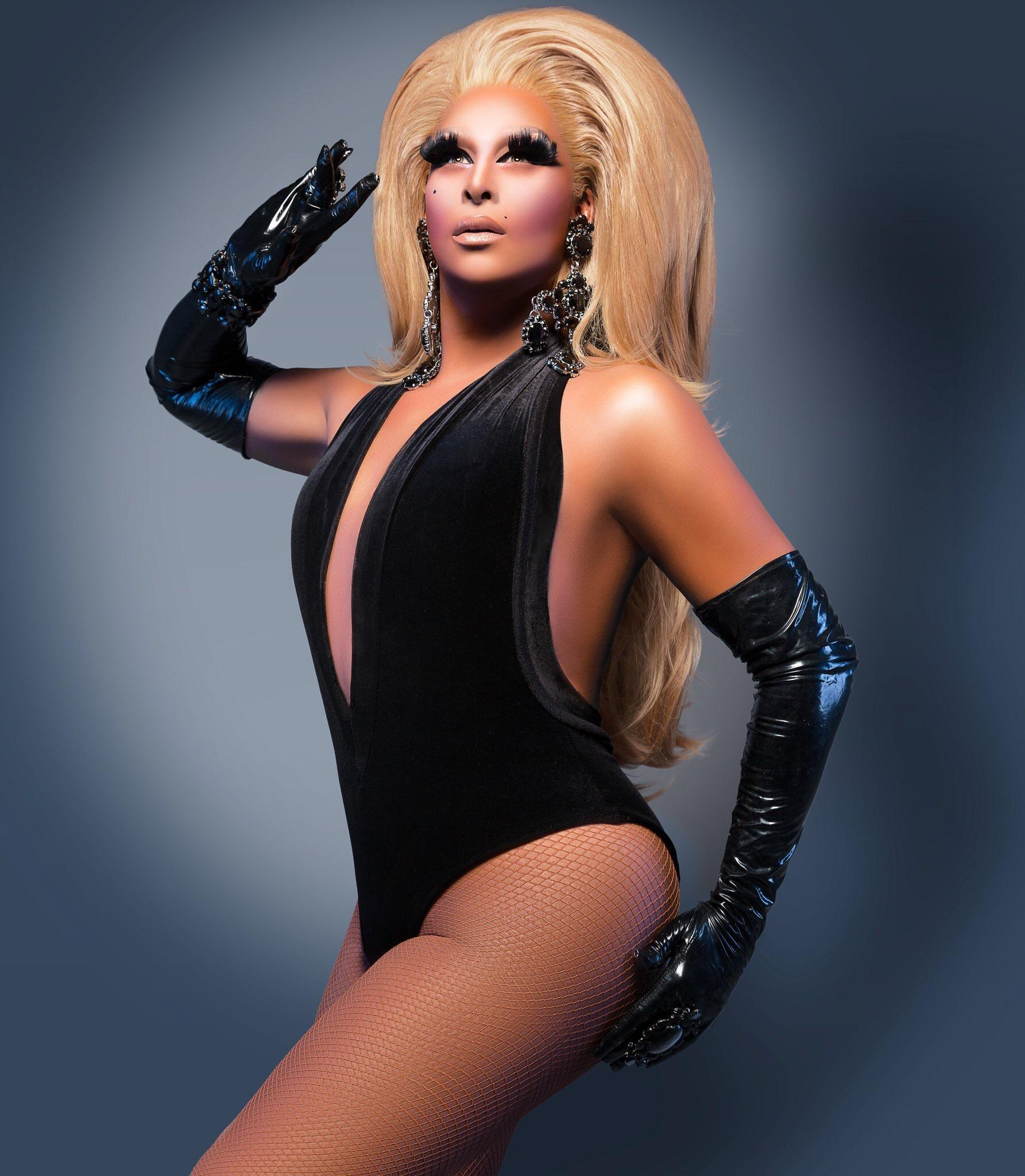
Roxxxy Andrews wins the episode's main challenge.

The contestants return to the workroom after Alyssa Edwards's elimination on the previous episode. On a new day, RuPaul greets the group and reveals the mini-challenge, which tasks the contestants with outlasting one another during "drag booty camp" with a fitness coach. Alaska is declared the winner of the mini-challenge. RuPaul then reveals the main challenge, which tasks the contestants with giving makeovers to gay veterans. As the winner of the mini-challenge, Alaska gets to pair the contestants and veterans.

The contestants and veterans get acquainted. Jinkx Monsoon and Dave talk about Judy Garland. RuPaul returns to the workroom to meet with each pair, asking questions and offering advice. Jinkx Monsoon and Dave share their intent to pay homage to Garland and her daughter Liza Minnelli. Dave suggests he "might have killed" Garland. Before leaving, RuPaul reveals that Clinton Kelly and George Kotsiopoulos are guest judges and that each team must also perform in a patriotic color guard presentation. The pairs rehearse their color guard routines on the main stage.

On elimination day, the contestants and veterans make final preparations in the workroom for the fashion show. Dave describes being discharged from the military for being gay. Detox talks about being injured from a traffic collision and how she found support from the drag community. On the main stage, RuPaul welcomes fellow judges Michelle Visage and Santino Rice, as well as guest judges Kelly and Kotsiopoulos. RuPaul shares the assignment of the main challenge, then the judges watch the color guard performances and fashion show. The judges deliver their critiques, deliberate, then share the results with the contestants. Roxxxy Andrews is declared the winner of the main challenge. Coco Montrese and Detox place in the bottom and face off to a lip-sync contest to "Two to Make It Right" (1989) by Seduction. Detox wins the lip-sync and Coco Montrese is eliminated from the competition.

== Production and broadcast ==
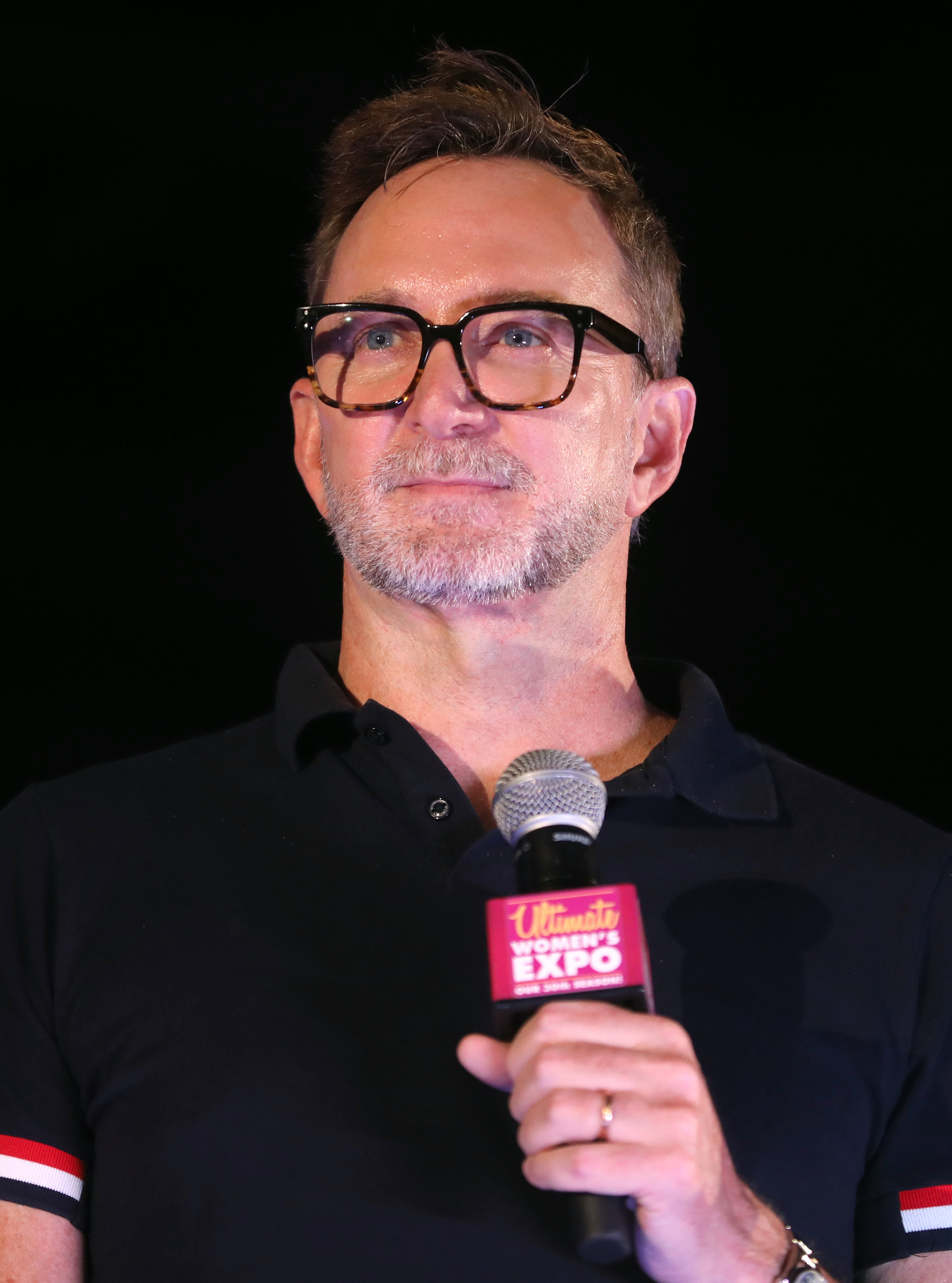
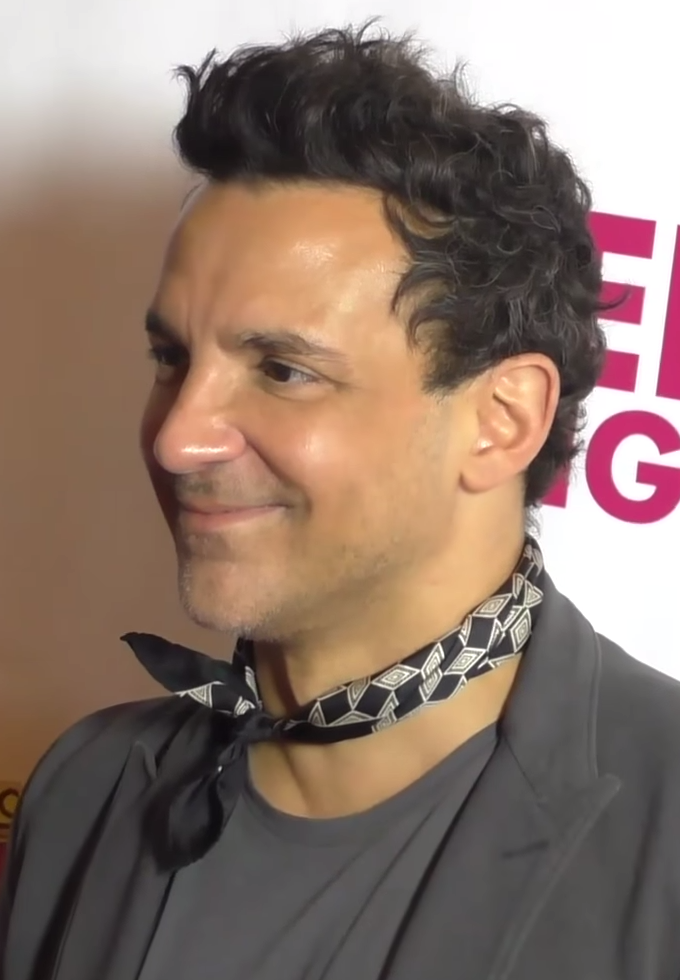
Clinton Kelly (left) and George Kotsiopoulos (right) are guest judges.

The episode originally aired on April 8, 2013.

Shawn Morales is among members of the Pit Crew in the episode.

=== Fashion ===
For the main stage, RuPaul wears a black dress and a blonde wig. For the fashion show, Jinkx Monsoon and Fortuna Monsoon have black outfits with matching headpieces. Roxxxy Andrews and Isabella Andrews have matching black-and-silver outfits, hoop earrings, and red wigs. Alaska and Nebraska have matching burglar-inspired black outfits with blonde wigs. Detox and Beth Adone have similar red-and-white outfits. Detox has a blonde wig and a red hat, while Beth Adone has a red wig with a white hat. Coco Montrese and Horchata Montrese have similar red outfits with matching boas and dark wigs.

== Reception and legacy ==
Oliver Sava of The A.V. Club gave the episode a rating of 'B+'. Kevin O'Keeffe ranked the "Two to Make It Right" performance number 63 in INTO Magazine's 2018 "definitive ranking" of the show's lip-sync contests to date.

Jinkx Monsoon referenced Dave "killing" Garland during her Snatch Game performance on the seventh season of RuPaul's Drag Race All Stars.
