= The S.O.U.L. S.Y.S.T.E.M. =

American R&B and dance music group

- Origin: United States
- Genres: R&B, dance
- Years active: 1992–1993
- Labels: Arista
- Members: Michelle Visage; Octahvia; Gary Michael Wade; Jamal Alicea

The S.O.U.L. S.Y.S.T.E.M. was an American R&B and dance music group, assembled by Robert Clivillés and David Cole of C&C Music Factory, that was active in 1992. The group featured lead vocals by Michelle Visage, who was formerly a member of another Clivilles & Cole group, Seduction (whose debut CD, Nothing Matters Without Love, had been produced by Clivillés & Cole in 1989). Rounding out the quartet were Octavia Lambertis (often credited simply as Octavia or Octahvia), Gary Michael Wade, and Jamal Alicea. The S.O.U.L. S.Y.S.T.E.M. produced one hit single, "It's Gonna Be a Lovely Day!", a pop/house song that was a cover version of the 1978 Bill Withers song "Lovely Day". The song appeared on the 1992 film soundtrack The Bodyguard. It reached number 1 on the Billboard Hot Dance Club Play chart, and peaked at number 34 on the Billboard Hot 100, number 17 on the UK Singles Chart in 1993, and number 90 in Australia on the ARIA Chart in 1993. The song "It's Gonna Be a Lovely Day!" was the only song on the soundtrack performed by an artist other than Whitney Houston released as a single in the US.

Visage was the recording artist by contract on this song (thus the single cover read "Introducing Michelle Visage") and the group was born out of a production deal for her as contracted by Clive Davis himself. Her contract included recording three albums but the entire first album was lost after completion and the contract then broken. Visage also shares a writing credit on "It's Gonna Be a Lovely Day!". The S.O.U.L. S.Y.S.T.E.M.'s debut album, Anything Goes!, was supposed to be released during 1993's first quarter. Per Michelle Visage, Clivillés + Cole failed to deliver the album's original master tapes (which was completed in early 1993) to Arista Records for reasons that are unknown to this day. Because the master tapes of the album were never delivered to the label, Arista never issued the album and the act was soon dropped thereafter.

Visage went on to become a TV and radio talk show host, along with RuPaul in NYC and on the cable channel VH1 and can be seen as a current judge on the reality competition show RuPaul's Drag Race. She was also a judge on Ireland's Got Talent and Queen of the Universe. Lambertis went on to provide vocals for several other artists throughout the 1990s.

== See also ==
- List of artists who reached number one on the US Dance chart
