= Sugar Ball =

- RuPaul's Drag Race episode
- Episode no.: Season 5 Episode 11
- Presented by: RuPaul
- Original air date: April 15, 2013

Guest appearances
- Marg Helgenberger (guest judge); Bob Mackie (guest judge)

Episode chronology
← Previous "Super Troopers"	Next → "The Final Three, Hunty"

"Sugar Ball" is the eleventh episode of the fifth season of the American television series RuPaul's Drag Race. It originally aired on April 15, 2013. The episode's main challenge tasks the contestants with creating three looks for the Sugar Ball. Marg Helgenberger and Bob Mackie are guest judges.

Alaska wins the main challenge. Detox is eliminated from the competition after placing in the bottom and losing a lip-sync contest against Jinkx Monsoon to "Malambo No. 1" by Yma Sumac.

== Episode ==
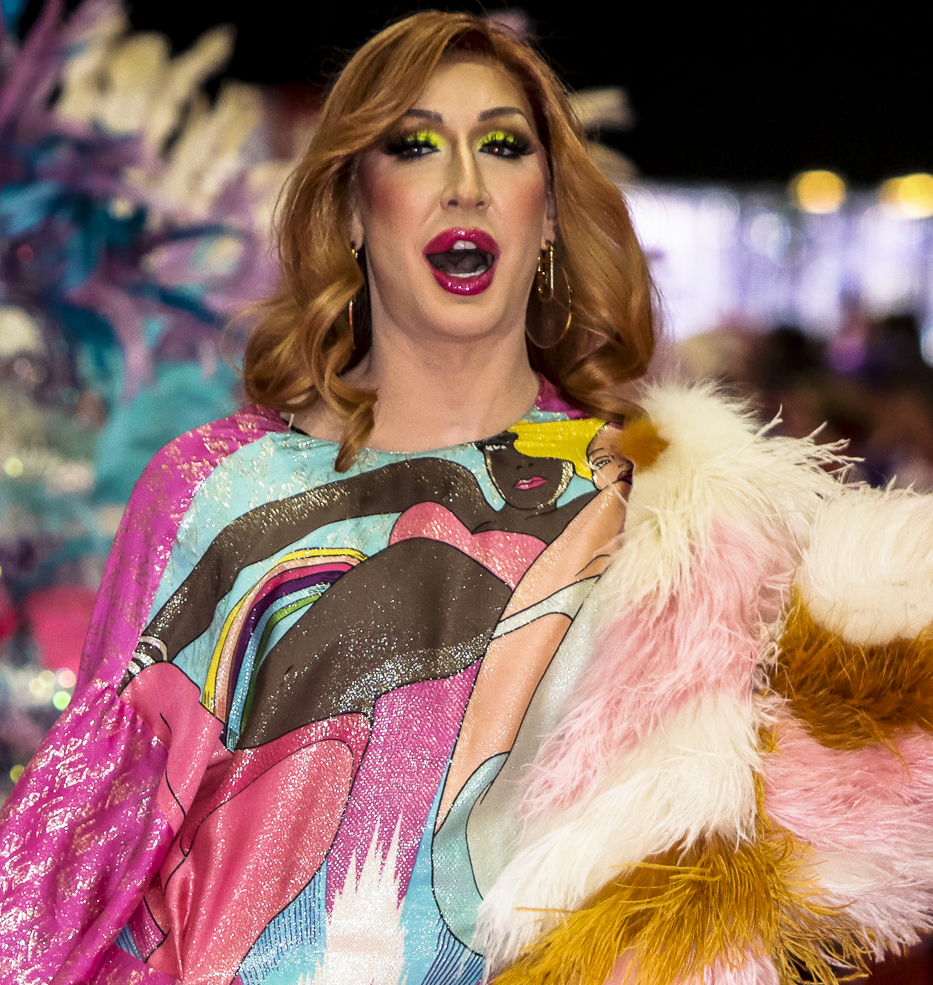
Detox is eliminated from the competition.

The contestants return to the workroom after Coco Montrese's elimination on the previous episode. On a new day, RuPaul greets the group and reveals the mini-challenge, which tasks the contestants with having a "bitch fest" in the form of a puppet show and impersonating each other. The contestants select their puppets and get them into "drag", then the puppet show commences. Alaska is declared the winner of the mini-challenge.

RuPaul reveals the main challenge, which tasks the contestants with creating three looks for the Sugar Ball. The categories are Super Duper Sweet 16, Sugar Mama ("executive realness"), and Candy Couture ("edible elaganza"). As the winner of the mini-challenge, Alaska gets a fifteen-second head start at selecting her materials. The rest of the contestants join to gather materials.

The contestants begin to create their looks. RuPaul returns to the workroom to meet with each contestant, asking questions and offering advice. Before leaving, RuPaul shares that Marg Helgenberger and Bob Mackie are guest judges. RuPaul also tasks the contestants with performing an opening number. For winning the mini-challenge, Alaska must oversee choreography. The contestants continue working on their outfits and rehearse choreography on the main stage. On elimination day, the contestants make final preparations in the workroom for the fashion show.

On the main stage, RuPaul welcomes fellow judges Michelle Visage and Santino Rice, as well as guest judges Helgenberger and Mackie. RuPaul shares the assignment of the main challenge, then the opening number and fashion show commence. The judges deliver their critiques. RuPaul asks each contestant to say who they think should be eliminated from the competition and why. The judges deliberate, then share the results with the contestants. Alaska is declared the winner of the main challenge. Detox and Jinkx Monsoon place in the bottom and face off in a lip-sync contest to "Malambo No. 1" by Yma Sumac. Jinkx Monsoon wins the lip-sync and Detox is eliminated from the competition.

== Production and broadcast ==
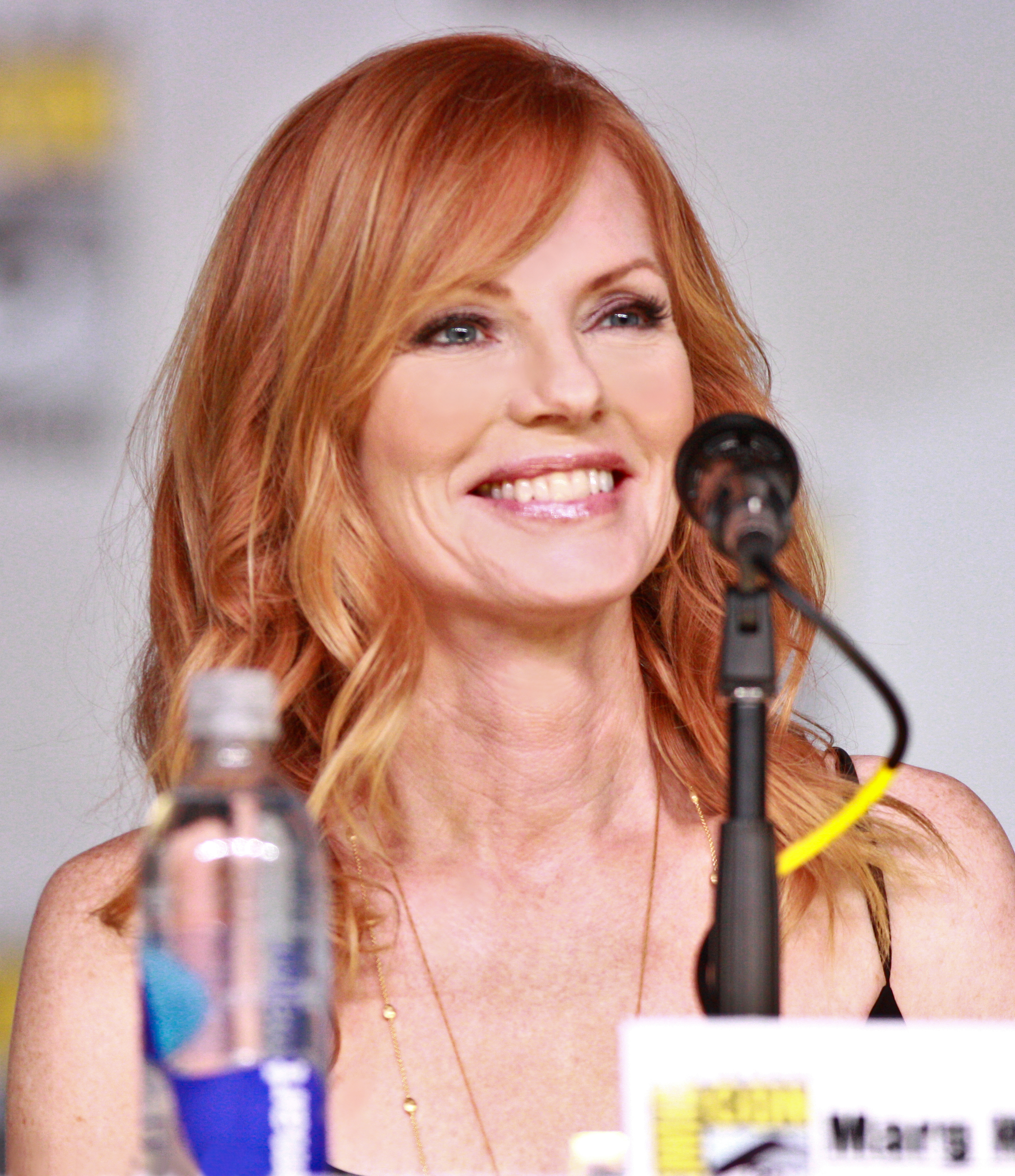
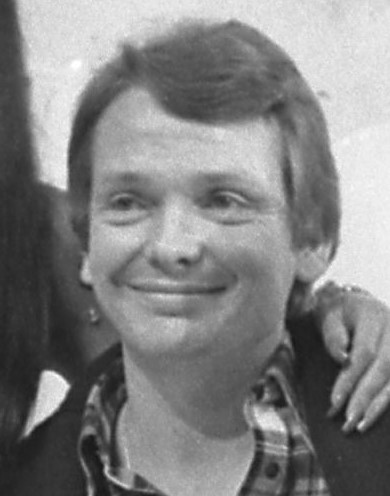
Actress Marg Helgenberger (left, pictured in 2013) and fashion designer Bob Mackie (right, pictured in 1975) are guest judges.

The episode originally aired on April 15, 2013.

Detox has said the lip-sync song was changed.

=== Fashion ===
For the main stage, RuPaul wears a pink dress with an animal print, as well as black earrings and a blonde wig. For the opening number, the contestants wear similar monochromatic outfits of different colors. For the category Super Duper Sweet 16, Alaska wears a short black dress and a blonde wig. She carries a pink purse. Jinkx Monsoon has a "Pacific Northwest stoner chick"-inspired outfit. Roxxxy Andrews wears a blue dress with sequins and a matching headband. Detox has a black dress with white polka dots, a pink jacket, and a matching headband.

For Sugar Mama, Alaska wears a black outfit with a yellow hard hat. Jinkx Monsoon has an orange dress and a red wig. She has pencils in her hair. Roxxxy Andrews wears a black velvet dress and a red wig. Detox has a blue dress, a black purse, and a blonde wig. She sprays perfume from a bottle. For Candy Couture, Alaska has a cotton candy-inspired pink outfit and a pink wig. Jinkx Monsoon has a red-and-white outfit and a blonde wig. Roxxxy Andrews wears a colorful liquorice-inspired dress. Detox has a black-and-green 1980s-inspired outfit.

== Reception and legacy ==
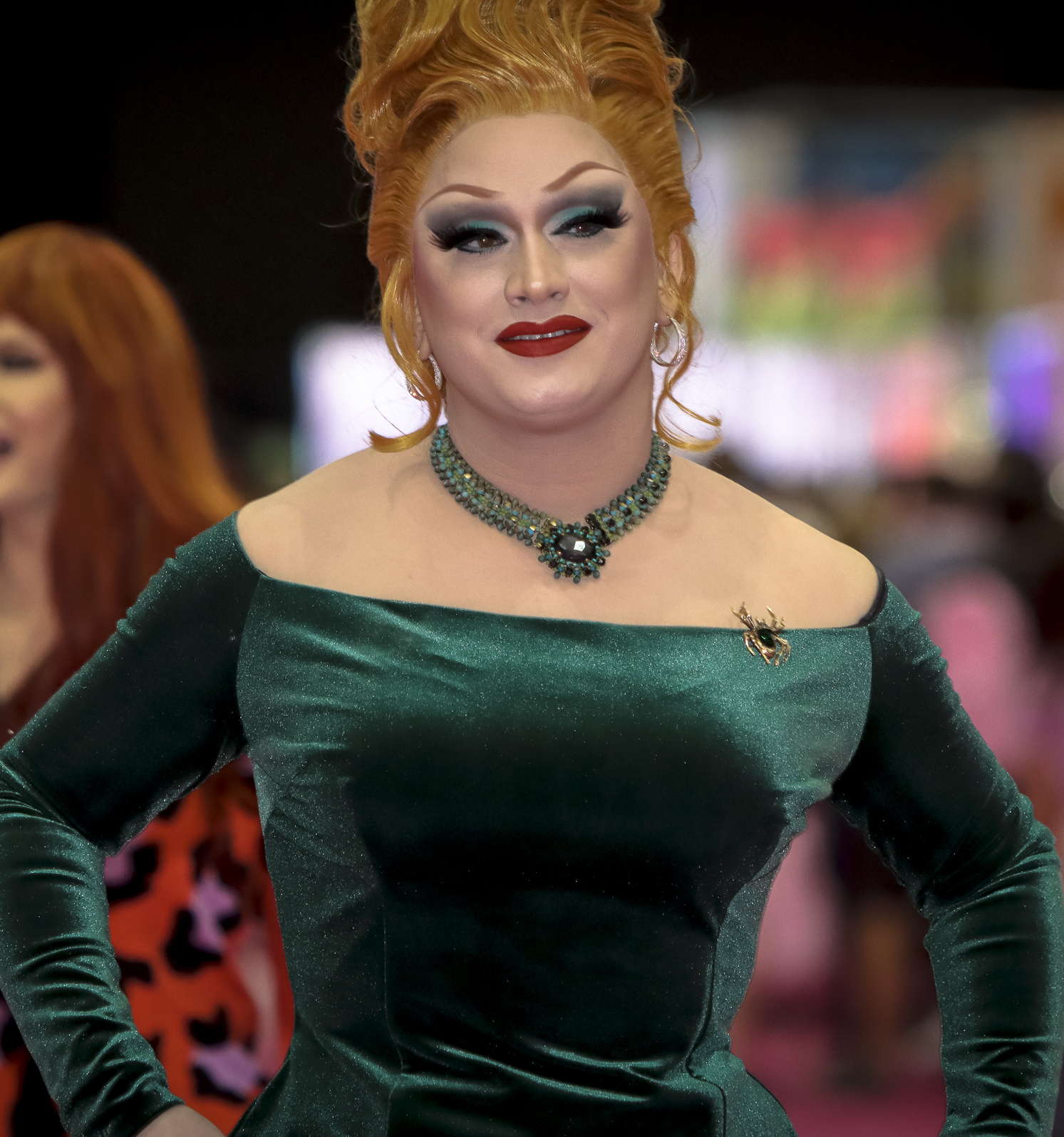
Jinkx Monsoon (pictured in 2022) wins the episode's lip-sync contest.

Oliver Sava of The A.V. Club gave the episode a rating of 'A'. In 2014, Marcus Wratten of PinkNews included one of Roxxxy Andrews's runway looks in an overview of the "best self-made Drag Race ball looks in herstory" and wrote: "With her 'Candy Couture' look ... Roxxxy Andrews made a startlingly strong case for turning Willy Wonka's chocolate factory into a gay club. Making a fringe rainbow dress out of candy laces? Give her the golden ticket right now."

In 2019, Kate Ng of Grazia said, "Probably everyone's personal highlight of season 5 was Monsoon’s Lip Sync For Your Life moment... Those lip-curling, hip-grinding dance moves and totally on-point syncing had the world torn up with laughter and yes, Monsoon won that round hands down." Keisha Hatchett ranked the lip-sync contest eighth in TV Guide's 2019 list of the show's thirteen best lip-syncs. Bernardo Sim included Jinkx Monsoon defeating Detox in Out magazine's 2023 list of the show's 25 "most iconic and gag-worthy moments".

The episode is referenced in the ninth episode of the show's fifteen season.
