= Drama Queens (RuPaul's Drag Race) =

- RuPaul's Drag Race episode
- Episode no.: Season 5 Episode 9
- Presented by: RuPaul
- Original air date: April 1, 2013

Guest appearances
- María Conchita Alonso (guest judge); Jamie-Lynn Sigler (guest judge); Wilmer Valderrama

Episode chronology
← Previous "Scent of a Drag Queen"	Next → "Super Troopers"
- RuPaul's Drag Race season 5

"Drama Queens" is the ninth episode of the fifth season of the American television series RuPaul's Drag Race. It originally aired on April 1, 2013. The episode's main challenge tasks the contestants with performing in telenovela-inspired sketches. María Conchita Alonso and Jamie-Lynn Sigler are guest judges. Wilmer Valderrama also makes a guest appearance.

Jinkx Monsoon wins the main challenge. Alyssa Edwards is eliminated from the competition after placing in the bottom two and losing a lip-sync against Coco Montrese to "Cold Hearted" by Paula Abdul.

== Episode ==
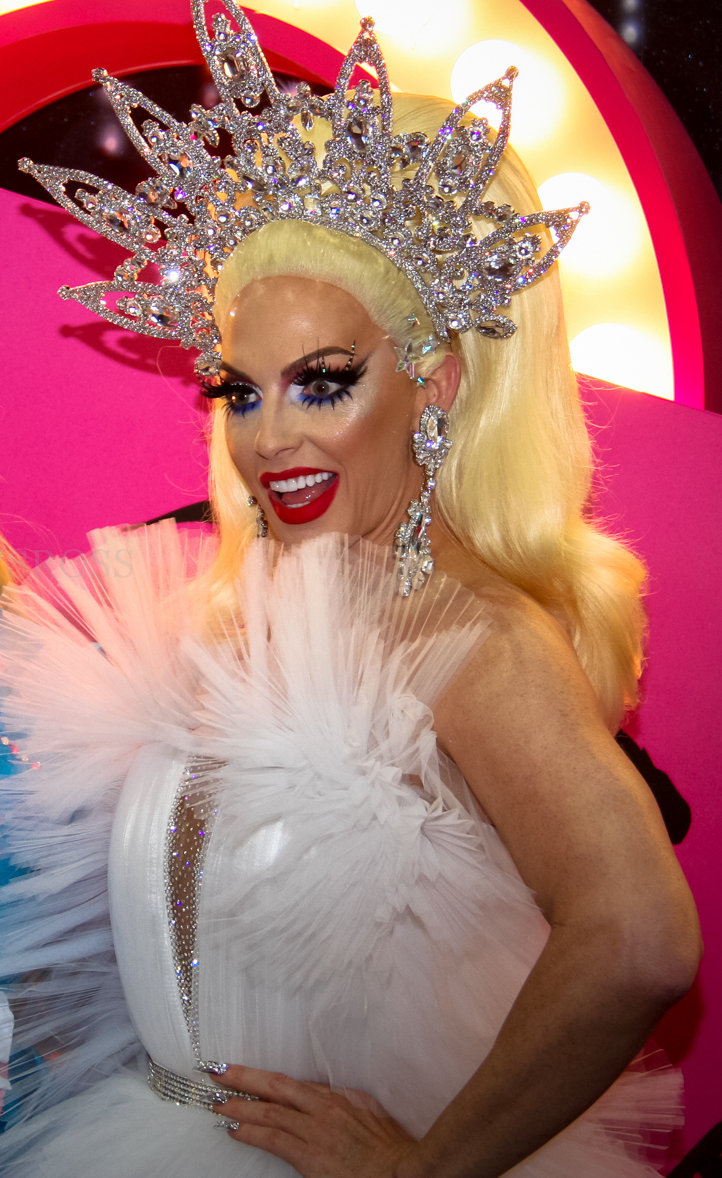
Alyssa Edwards is eliminated from the competition.

The contestants return to the workroom after Ivy Winters's elimination on the previous episode. On a new day, RuPaul greets the group and reveals the mini-challenge, which tasks the contestants with creating a fake "sob story" and producing real tears. Detox talks about the real life death of her boyfriend. Alyssa Edwards and Detox win the mini-challenge.

RuPaul then reveals the main challenge, which tasks the contestants with performing in one of two telenovela-inspired sketches. As the winners of the mini-challenge, Alyssa Edwards and Detox select teammates. Alyssa Edwards, Coco Montrese, and Jinkx Monsoon are on Team Casa de Locas ("Crazy House"). Alaska, Detox, and Roxxxy Andrews are on Team Ella No Es Dama ("She's Not a Lady"). The contestants get into teams and review the characters and scripts. RuPaul returns to the workroom to meet with both teams, asking questions and offering advice. Before leaving, RuPaul reveals the runway category for the fashion show ("Latina Glamarose Eleganza"). The teams film with RuPaul, Alonso, and guest actor Wilmer Valderrama.

On elimination day, the contestants make final preparations in the workroom for the fashion show. Detox talks again about her ex-boyfriend's death. On the main stage, RuPaul welcomes fellow judges Michelle Visage and Santino Rice, as well as guest judges Alonso and Jamie-Lynn Sigler. RuPaul shares the assignment of the main challenge and the runway category, then the fashion show commences. The judges and contestants watch the two sketches. The judges then deliver their critiques, deliberate, and share the results with the contestants. Jinkx Monsoon is declared the winner. Alyssa Edwards and Coco Montrese place in the bottom and face off in a lip-sync contest to "Cold Hearted" (1989) by Paula Abdul. Coco Montrese wins the lip-sync and Alyssa Edwards is eliminated from the competition.

== Production and broadcast ==
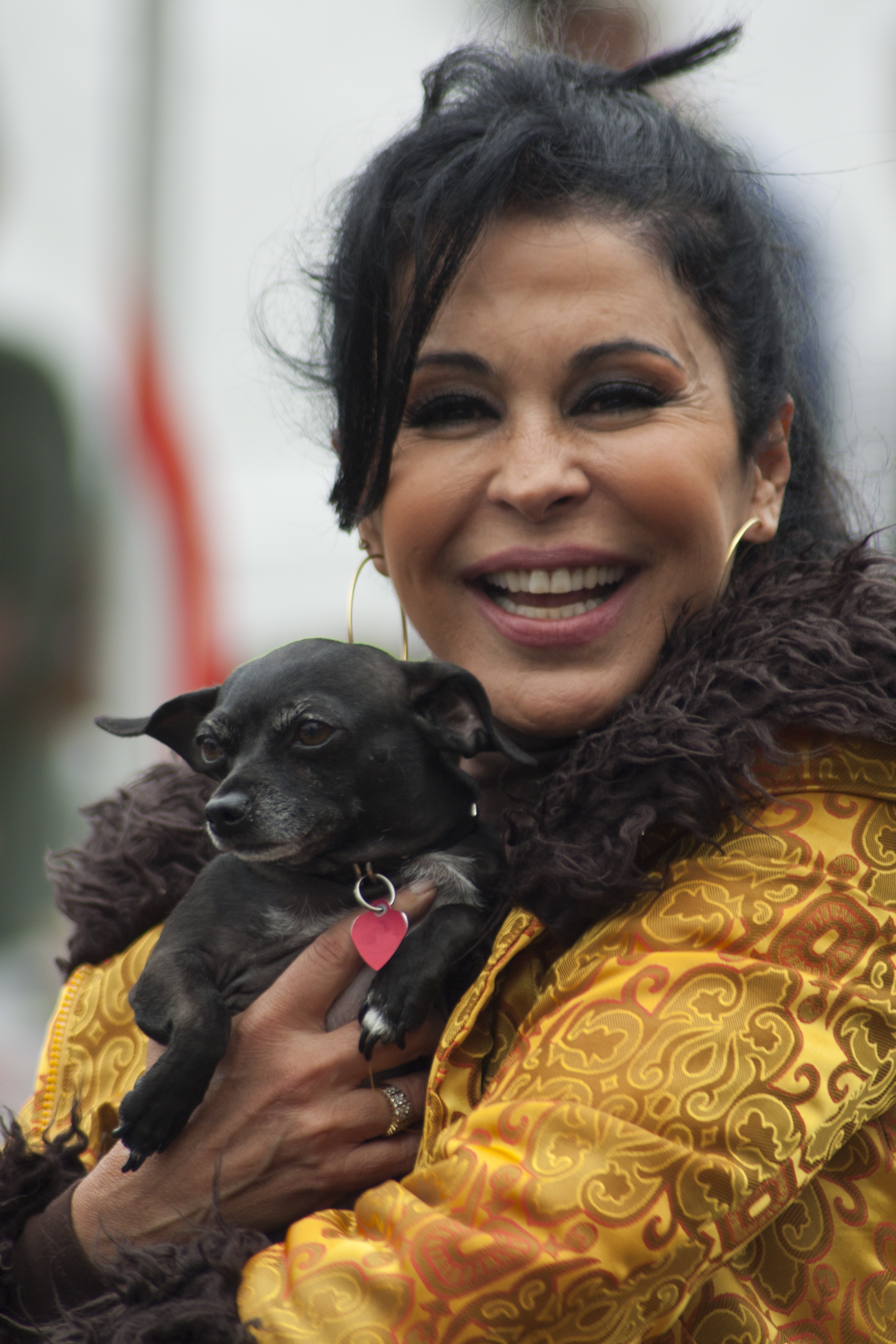
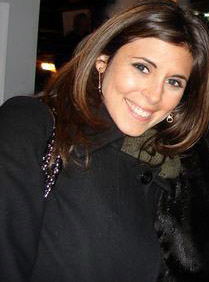
María Conchita Alonso (left) and Jamie-Lynn Sigler (right) are guest judges.

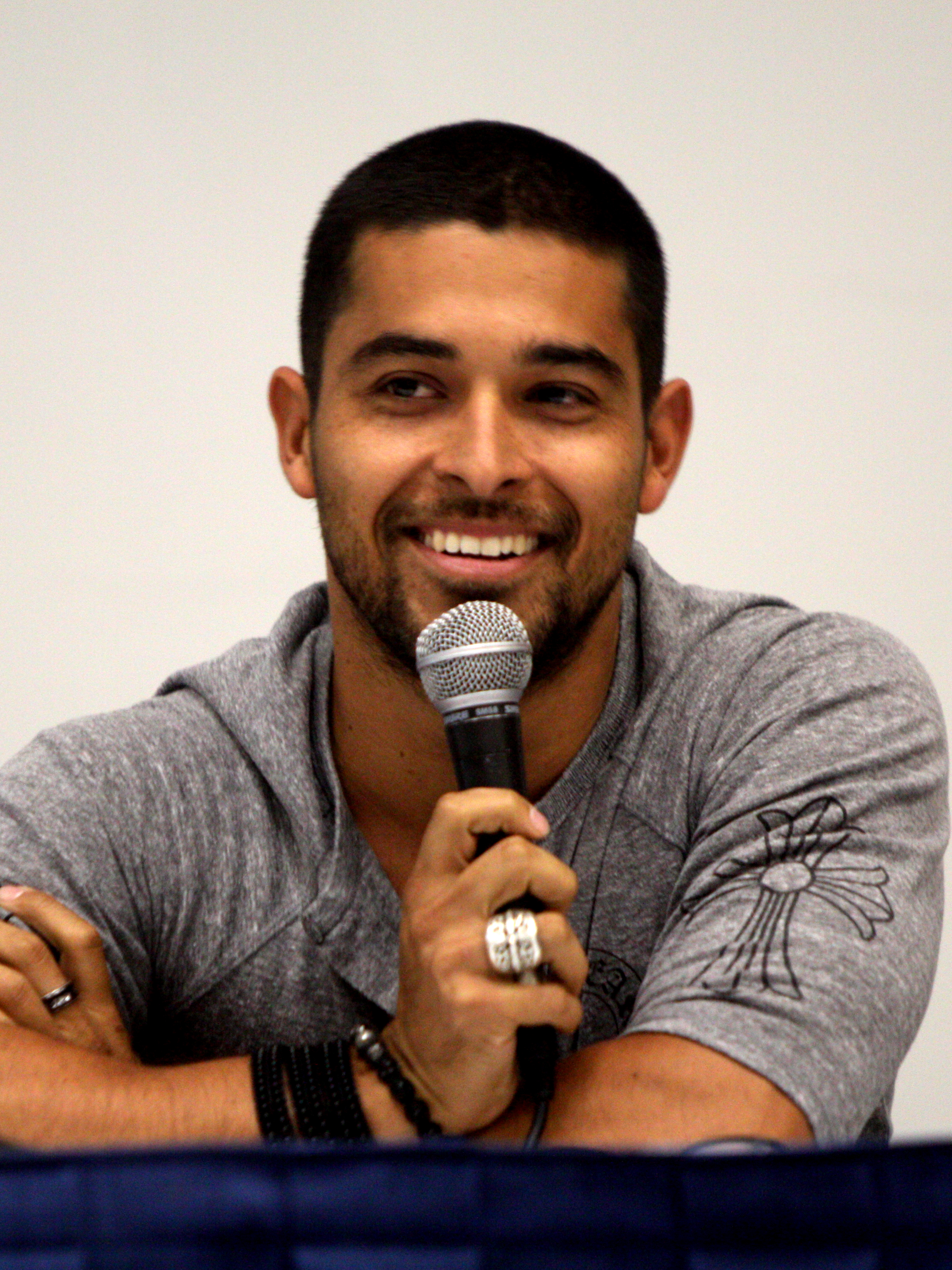
American actor Wilmer Valderrama (pictured in 2012) also makes a guest appearance for the main challenge.

The episode originally aired on April 1, 2013.

During the lip-sync contest, Alyssa completes splits and death drops, and Coco Montrese points to her mouth as she mouths fast lyrics.

=== Fashion ===
For the main stage, RuPaul wears a green dress and a long blonde wig. For the fashion show, Detox has a pink outfit with matching high-heeled shoes, a sombrero, and a red wig. Roxxxy Andrews and Alaska wear red dresses and dark wigs. Roxxxy Andrews also has a black corset and Alaska carries maracas. Alyssa Edwards has a black dress with red accents, as well as a hand fan and a dark wig. Coco Montrese wears a yellow jumpsuit with colorful flowers and large sleeves. Jinkx Monoson has a Day of the Dead-inspired look.

== Reception ==
Oliver Sava of The A.V. Club gave the episode a rating of 'B+'. Queerty called the lip-sync contest "rousing". E! said the lip-sync was "amplified" by the history and rivalry between Alyssa Edwards and Coco Montrese. E. Alex Jung gave the performance "honorable mention" in Vulture's 2014 list of the show's ten best lip-syncs. Josh Lee ranked the contest third in Digital Spy's 2016 list of the show's ten best lip-syncs. Mikelle Street included Coco Montrese's performance in Out magazine's 2020 list of nine "lip syncs that prove you don't need stunts and reveals".

In 2022, Cailyn Szelinski of Screen Rant included the lip-sync in a list of the ten best Drag Race lip-syncs of all time, according to Reddit, and wrote: "Some things about RuPaul's Drag Race are fake, but one thing that isn't was the feud between Alyssa Edwards and Coco Montrese that resulted in one of the best lip-syncs on the show... Both queens pulled out all the stops, Alyssa turning big tricks and Coco using her outfit to pull focus. But when Coco literally pointed to her mouth to show the judges she knew every single word to Paula Abdul's difficult rap ... she secured the win." The website's Mariana Fernandes also included the contest in a 2022 list of the show's fifteen best lip-syncs.
