= Scent of a Drag Queen =

- RuPaul's Drag Race episode
- Episode no.: Season 5 Episode 8
- Presented by: RuPaul
- Original air date: March 18, 2013

Guest appearances
- Aubrey O'Day (guest judge); Joan Van Ark (guest judge); Andrew Christian; Shawn Morales (Pit Crew)

Episode chronology
← Previous "RuPaul Roast"	Next → "Drama Queens"
- RuPaul's Drag Race season 5

"Scent of a Drag Queen" is the eighth episode of the fifth season of the American television series RuPaul's Drag Race. It originally aired on March 18, 2013. The episode's main challenge tasks the contestants with creating, marketing, and filming commercials for signature fragrances. Aubrey O'Day and Joan Van Ark are guest judges. Shawn Morales is among members of the Pit Crew in the episode.

Alaska wins the episode's main challenge. Ivy Winters is eliminated from the competition after placing in the bottom and losing a lip-sync contest against Alyssa Edwards to "Ain't Nothin' Goin' On but the Rent" by Gwen Guthrie.

== Episode ==
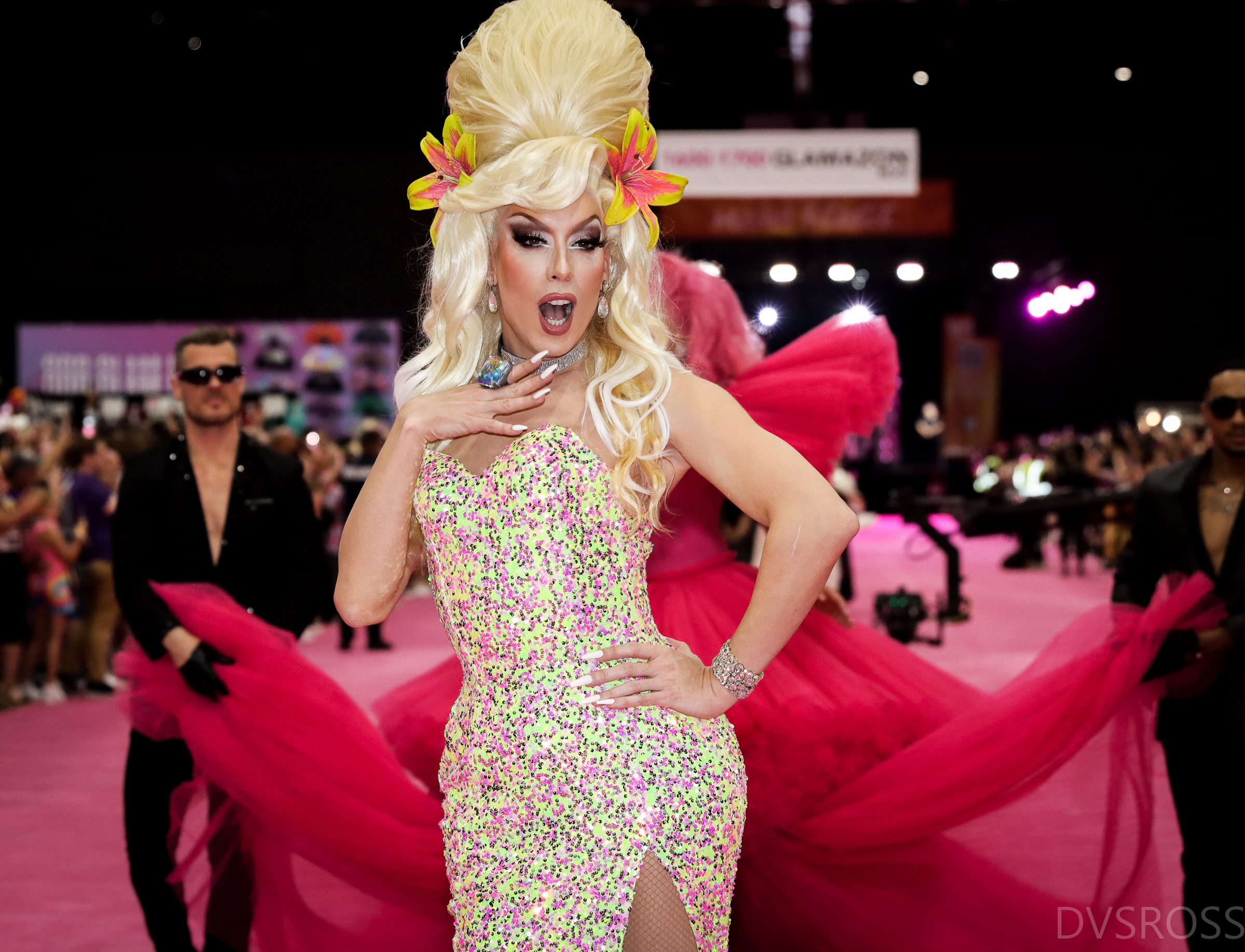
Alaska Thunderfuck (pictured at RuPaul's DragCon LA in 2024) wins the episode's main challenge.

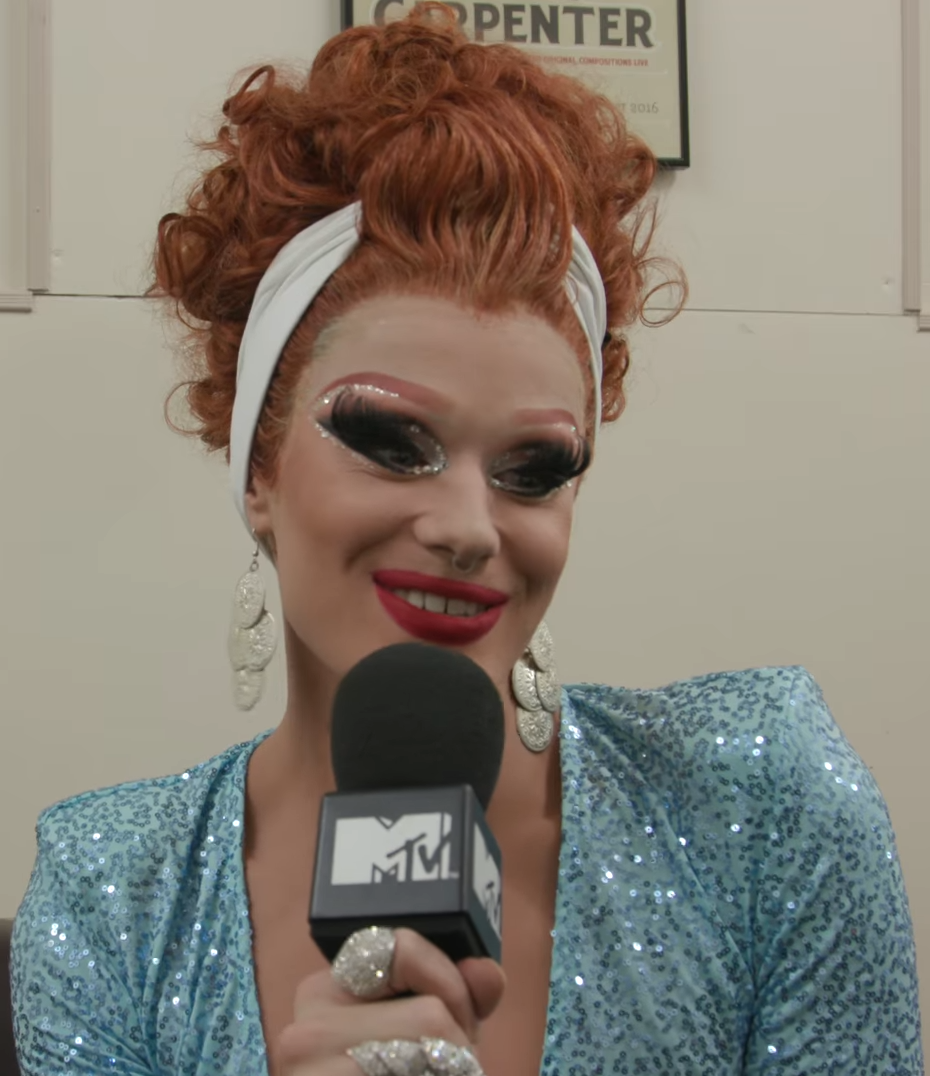
Ivy Winters (pictured in 2018) is eliminated from the competition.

The contestants return to the workroom after no one was eliminated on the previous episode. Roxxxy Andrews talks about her mother leaving her at a bus stop and going to an orphanage. She apologizes to Jinkx Monsoon for her behavior. On a new day, RuPaul greets the group and invites Andrew Christian and the Pit Crew to assist. The game Whatcha Packin'? tasks the contestants with matching Pit Crew members wearing the same type of underwear. Ivy Winters wins the mini-challenge.

RuPaul then reveals the main challenge, which tasks the contestants with creating, marketing, and filming commercials for signature fragrances. The contestants start to develop their scents and concepts. RuPaul returns to meet with each contestants, asking questions and offering advice. Before leaving, RuPaul reveals that Michelle Visage and Aubrey O'Day will be directing the commercials, and that Joan Van Ark is a guest judge. The contestants film the commercials in front of a green screen. Following are the contestants and their fragrances:

- Alaska – Red for Filth
- Alyssa Edwards – Alyssa's Secret
- Coco Montrese – Ru Animale by Coco
- Detox – Heroine
- Ivy Winters – Dress Code
- Jinkx Monsoon – Delusion
- Roxxxy Andrews – Thick and Juicy

On elimination day, the contestants make final preparations in the workroom for the fashion show. Alaska shares a book of photographs, which includes images of her partner Sharon Needles, with the group. For winning the mini-challenge, Ivy Winters has a video call with her mother. Jinkx Monsoon reveals to the group that she has a crush on Ivy Winters.

On the main stage, RuPaul welcomes fellow judges Visage and Santino Rice, as well as guest judges O'Day and Van Ark. RuPaul shares the main challenge and fashion show assignments, then the contestants present their runway looks. The judges and contestants watch the commercials. The judges then deliver their critiques, deliberate, then share the results with the group. Alaska, Detox, and Jinkx Monsoon receive positive critiques, and Alaska wins the challenge. Alyssa Edwards, Ivy Winters, and Roxxxy Andrews receive negative critiques, and Roxxxy Andrews is deemed safe. Alyssa Edwards and Ivy Winters place in the bottom and face off in a lip-sync contest to "Ain't Nothin' Goin' On but the Rent" by Gwen Guthrie. Alyssa Edwards wins the lip-sync and Ivy Winters is eliminated from the competition.

== Production and broadcast ==
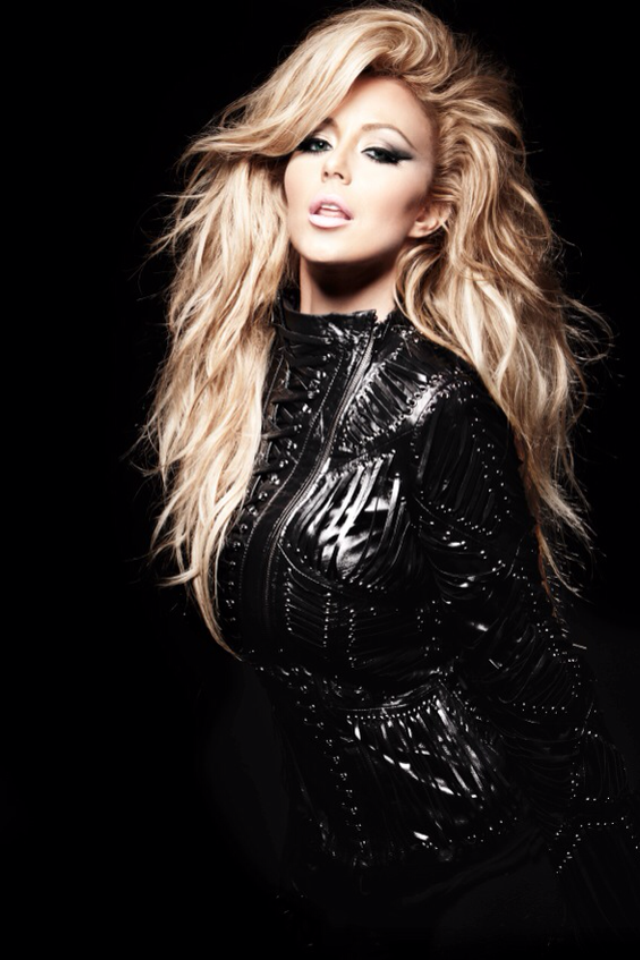
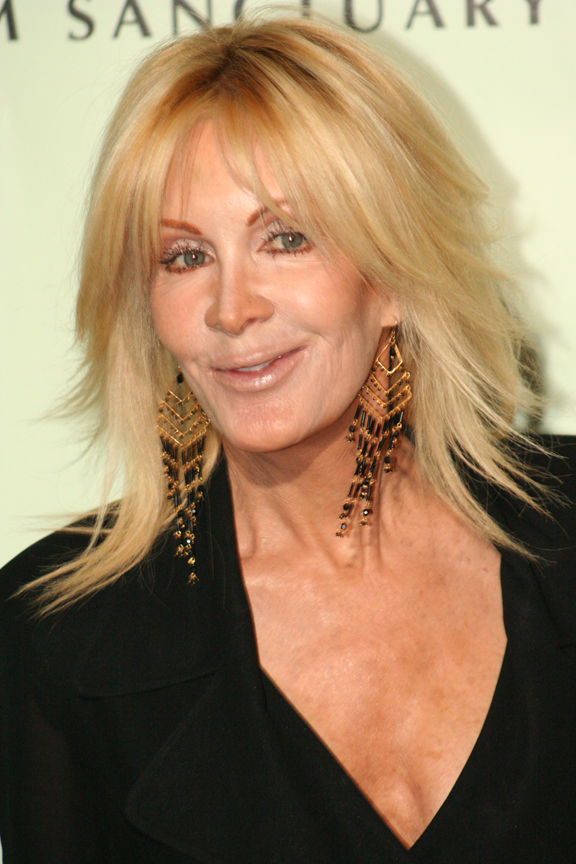
Aubrey O'Day (top) and Joan Van Ark (bottom) are guest judges.

The episode originally aired on March 18, 2013.

In her commercial, Alaska says, "Your makeup is terrible." Alaska has said that she stole another one of the lines in her commercial from RuPaul.

Shawn Morales is among members of the Pit Crew in the episode.

=== Fashion ===
For her commercial, Coco Montrese wears a leopard print. Detox has a black dress with a floral print. Alyssa Edwards wears a short black dress, gold high-heeled shoes, and a dark wig. Roxxxy Andrews has a yellow outfit with matching gloves, as well as large earrings and a brown wig. Alaska wears a red dress with matching high-heels, black gloves, and a large blonde wig.

For the main stage, RuPaul wears a bright dress and a large blonde wig. For the fashion show, the contestants are tasked with presenting a look as the spokesperson of their fragrance. Coco Montrese wears a black-and-white outfit with gold accessories. Alaska wears a short red dress with a black jacket and a red wig. Ivy Winters has a light pink outfit and a red wig. Detox has a black-and-tan outfit with black high-heels. Alyssa Edwards has a black-and-green outfit. Jinkx Monsoon wears a flapper and a red wig. Roxxxy Andrews has a pink backless catsuit and a red wig.

== Reception and legacy ==
Oliver Sava of The A.V. Club gave the episode a rating of 'A-'. Kevin O'Keeffe ranked the "Ain't Nothin' Goin' On but the Rent" performance number 64 in INTO Magazine's 2018 "definitive ranking" of the show's lip-sync contests to date. Sam Brooks ranked the performance number 93 in The Spinoff's 2019 "definitive ranking" of the show's 162 lip-syncs to date. Writing for Xtra Magazine n 2021, O'Keeffe called Alaska's concept "very clever" and said the line "your makeup is terrible" is " instantly iconic". Jom Elauria included the line "delusion: convince yourself" in Screen Rant's 2022 list of the ten best Jinkx Monsoon quotes, writing: "The commercial challenge in season 5 has spawned some of the catchiest taglines in the show, from [Alaska's] 'Red for Filth' to Alyssa Edwards's 'Alyssa's Secret.' As one of the funniest queens in Drag Race herstory, Jinkx also created a tagline commercial that still lives rent-free in fans' heads today."

Alaska released the song "Your Makeup Is Terrible" in 2014. She subsequently released an album called Red 4 Filth (2022), which included the song "Red". Alyssa Edwards subsequently hosted the web series Alyssa's Secret and Alyssa's Secret: The Reboot. In 2024, after Jinkx Monsoon released a fragrance, Jude Cramer of INTO Magazine wrote, "The question remains: why not base the perfume on her viral Delusion perfume from Season 5 of Drag Race? The much-memed clip from a challenge where the queens had to create and promote their own fragrances is an iconic part of Jinkx’s history with the show."
