= The Expendables (2000 film) =

- Written by: Patricia Resnick; Peter Geiger; Bruno Heller
- Directed by: Janet Meyers
- Starring: Brett Cullen; Robin Givens; Idalis DeLeón
- Music by: Frankie Blue
- Country of origin: United States
- Original language: English

Production
- Executive producer: Jana Sue Memel
- Producer: Anthony Santa Croce
- Cinematography: João Fernandes
- Editor: Virginia Katz
- Running time: 100 minutes
- Production company: USA Cable Entertainment

Original release
- Network: USA Network
- Release: April 25, 2000

The Expendables is a 2000 American made-for-television action film directed by Janet Meyers. It was written by Patricia Resnick, Peter Geiger and Bruno Heller. It stars Brett Cullen, Robin Givens, Idalis DeLeón and Tempestt Bledsoe. It aired April 25, 2000 on the USA Network.

== Plot ==
A group of female convicts volunteer for a mission to rescue a woman from a Cuban prison.

== Cast ==
- Brett Cullen as Deacon
- Robin Givens as Randy
- Idalis DeLeón as Ver
- Tempestt Bledsoe as Tanika
- Jenica Bergere as Sue
- Cristi Conaway as Nicoline
- Jennifer Blanc as Christine
- Julie Carmen as Jackie
- Megan Cavanagh as Prison Warden (as Megan Cavenagh)
- Thom Barry as Tyler
- Annette Helde as Rosa
- Eileen Weisinger as Anna (as Ayleen Weisinger)
- Wil Cesares as Jorge
- David Norona as Ramone
- Omar Ynigo as Maquito
