= Idalis DeLeón =

American singer (born 1969)

- Born: Idalis M. DeLeón; June 15, 1969 (age 56); Brooklyn, New York City, New York, U.S.
- Other names: Idalis De Leon; Idalis Deleon; Idalis; Idalis Leon
- Occupations: Singer; actress; model; television personality; television host
- Years active: 1988–present
- Known for: MTV – VJ (1994–98)
- Musical career
- Genres: R&B; Dance; House
- Website: idali5.wixsite.com/coming-soon

Idalis M. DeLeón (born June 15, 1969) is an American singer, actress, and television host. DeLeón is best known as an MTV VJ from June 1994 until March 1997. DeLeón is also known for her acting roles as Roni De Santos during the fifth season of the sitcom Living Single (1997–1998) and Charity in the 1998 comedy film Ride.

== Career ==
DeLeón, who is of Puerto Rican ancestry, first began her career in the South Bronx, New York City, as a member of the girl group Seduction, who scored a top ten hit "Two to Make It Right" in 1989. As an entertainment reporter and anchor, DeLeón has worked for VH1, Fox Family, Fox Sports, Access Hollywood, and since 2003 as the weekend hostess for Extra. Since 2004 DeLeón has also been the co-host of the Sí TV show Breakfast, Lunch, and Dinner. She also has several acting credits including a recurring role on the Sci Fi Channel series The Invisible Man. In 2004, she played the stripper Sophia in eight episodes of Six Feet Under. Her most recent appearances include roles on FX's Nip/Tuck, and as "Concha" on the USA Network's Burn Notice.

== Filmography ==
=== Film ===
Year	Title	Role	Notes
1997	B*A*P*S	Herself	
1998	Ride	Charity	
1999	Ugly Naked People	Rose	Short
2000	The Expendables	Ver	TV movie
2000	Very Mean Men	Argentine	
2000	Celebrity	Tatiana	TV movie
2002	Man of the Year	Joan	
2002	Naked Movie	Jodi	
2004	Woman Thou Art Loosed	Nicole	
2005	Brothers in Arms	Sheriff Sanchez	
2006	Running Scared	Divina	
2007	Safe Harbour	Millie	Video
2009	Vicious Circle	Helena	

=== Television ===
Year	Title	Role	Notes
1990	Dionne and Friends	Herself/musical guest	Episode: "Episode #1.8"
1990	Soul Train	Herself/musical guest	Episode: "Angela Winbush/David Peaston/Seduction"
1996	Baywatch	Herself	Episode: "Beachblast"
1996	Moesha	Herself	Episode: "A Concerted Effort: Part 1 & 2"
1997–98	Living Single	Brenda "Roni" De Santos	Recurring cast: season 5
1998	Outrageous!	Host	TV series
1999	The Wayans Bros.	Sandra	Episode: "Big Brother"
1999	The Love Boat: The Next Wave	Pilar Sanchez	Episode: "Cuba"
1999	For Your Love	Sonya	Episode: "The Thanks You Get"
1999	Mondo Picasso	Jennifer Rome	TV series
1999	The King of Queens	Jill	Episode: "I, Candy"
2000	Shasta McNasty	Maria	Episode: "Big Brother"
2000	Beverly Hills, 90210	Julie	Episode: "Spring Fever"
2000	Happily Ever After: Fairy Tales for Every Child	Guillermina Scarlett (voice)	Episode: "Robinita Hood"
2001	The Invisible Man	Allianora	Recurring cast: season 1
2001	The Beast	Sylvia	Recurring cast
2001	The District	Jennifer Roscoe	Episode: "Tug of War"
2001	Men, Women & Dogs	Danielle	Episode: "Old Dog, New Tricks"
2002	Body & Soul	Yolanda Rosales	TV series
2003–04	Six Feet Under	Sophia	Guest: season 3, recurring cast: season 4
2005	Missing	Anna Delores	Episode: "Phoenix Rising"
2006	Nip/Tuck	Gala Gallardo	Episode: "Gala Gallardo"
2007	Burn Notice	Concha Ramirez	Episode: "Broken Rules"
2008	Commuter Confidential	Carmen	TV series
2017	Sangre Negra	Captain Rachel Garcia	Episode: "Coupe de E'tat"
