= Two to Make It Right =

Single by Seduction

from the album Nothing Matters Without Love
- B-side: "Original 7-inch"
- Released: November 30, 1989
- Genre: House-pop
- Length: 4:13 (7-inch remix); 4:11 (Original 7-inch); 5:23 (LP version)
- Label: Vendetta
- Songwriter: David Cole
- Producers: David Cole, Robert Clivillés

Seduction singles chronology
"(You're My One and Only) True Love" (1989)	"Two to Make It Right" (1989)	"Heartbeat" (1990)

"Two to Make It Right" is a song by the American girl group Seduction, released as a single in late 1989. It appears on the group's first album, Nothing Matters Without Love (1989), featuring April Harris and Michelle Visage on lead vocals. "Two to Make It Right" peaked at number two on the US Billboard Hot 100. The accompanying music video was directed by Stu Sleppin and produced by Bob Teeman.

The song was performed by drag queens Coco Montrese and Detox on an episode of the fifth season of the reality competition RuPaul's Drag Race, in which Visage is a main judge. "Two to Make It Right" was covered by British rock band Busted in 2018.

== Composition ==
"Two to Make It Right" contains a sample of the song "Kiss" as performed by the Art of Noise featuring Tom Jones, and a sample of "It Takes Two" by Rob Base and DJ E-Z Rock, which itself contains a sample of Lyn Collins's "Think (About It)"; the latter song has its roots in James Brown's famous and often sampled "Yeah! Woo!" drum break.

== Commercial reception ==
"Two to Make It Right" reached number two on the Billboard Hot 100 chart in the US in February 1990, staying there for two weeks. The song also spent one week at the top of the Billboard Hot Dance Club Play chart in January 1990 and twelve weeks on the chart.

Two notable live performances of the song have been uploaded to YouTube. One was during the 1990 MDA Telethon, which is the only known version to include a rap by Michelle Visage, which was performed live, while the song was likely lip-synced. The other was a performance on The Mickey Mouse Club in 1989. What is notable about this performance is that a pre-recorded version of the song was played afterward, when the members taught two of the hosts the basics of voguing, which sounded exactly the same. This shows that the group was lip-syncing.

== Track listings ==
- 7-inch single – Europe
1. "Two to Make It Right" (the radio mix) – 4:11
2. "Two to Make It Right" (the house dub) – 5:12
- 7-inch single – US
1. "Two to Make It Right" (7-inch remix) – 4:13
2. "Two to Make It Right" (Original 7-inch) – 4:11
- 12-inch maxi – Europe
1. "Two to Make It Right" (the club mix) – 6:20
2. "Two to Make It Right" (the hip house vocal) – 6:18
3. "Two to Make It Right" (the house dub) – 5:12
- 12-inch maxi – US
1. "Two to Make It Right" (Cole / Clivillés club mix) – 6:20
2. "Two to Make It Right" (Cole / Clivillés dub mix) – 5:02
3. "Two to Make It Right" (7-inch remix) – 4:11
4. "Two to Make It Right" (Hip house vocal mix) – 6:18
5. "Two to Make It Right" (Cole / Clivillés house dub) – 5:12
- CD maxi
1. "Two to Make It Right" (the radio mix) – 4:11
2. "Two to Make It Right" (the club mix) – 6:20
3. "Two to Make It Right" (the hip house vocal) – 6:18

== Credits ==
- Mixed by Bob Rosa
- Engineered by Steve Griffin
- Mastered by Ted Jensen
- Executive producer: Bruce Carbone and Larry Yasgar
- Edited by Clivillés, Cole and Ricky Crespo
- Produced by Clivillés & Cole

== Charts ==
=== Weekly charts ===
Weekly chart performance for "Two to Make It Right"
Chart (1990)	Peak position
Canada Top Singles (RPM)	10
Canada Dance/Urban (RPM)	1
France (SNEP)	34
New Zealand (Recorded Music NZ)	17
UK Singles (Official Charts)	79
US Billboard Hot 100	2
US Dance Club Songs (Billboard)	1
US Dance Singles Sales (Billboard)	1
US Top 40/Dance (Billboard)	1
West Germany (GfK)	43

=== Year-end charts ===
Year-end chart performance for "Two to Make It Right"
Chart (1990)	Position
Canada Top Singles (RPM)	94
Canada Dance/Urban (RPM)	28
US Billboard Hot 100	30
US 12-inch Singles Sales (Billboard)	8
US Dance Club Play (Billboard)	8
US Cash Box Top 100	34

== See also ==
- List of number-one dance singles of 1990 (U.S.)
