= Nothing Matters Without Love =

Studio album by Seduction
- Released: September 25, 1989
- Studios: Axis, Skyline, and Right Track, NYC
- Genres: Dance; R&B; freestyle
- Length: 54:42
- Label: A&M
- Producers: David Cole; Robert Clivilles

Seduction chronology
Nothing Matters Without Love (1989)	Feel Brand New (2005)

Singles from Nothing Matters Without Love
- 1. "Seduction's Theme" Released: 1989; 2. "(You're My One and Only) True Love" Released: 1989; 3. "Two to Make It Right" Released: November 30, 1989; 4. "Heartbeat" Released: 1990; 5. "Could This Be Love" Released: 1990; 6. "Breakdown" Released: 1990

Professional ratings
Review scores
Source	Rating
AllMusic	2/5 stars
Robert Christgau	B+

Nothing Matters Without Love is the debut album released by the dance-pop group Seduction.

== Commercial performance ==
Released on September 25, 1989, the album reached No. 36 on the Billboard pop albums chart and No. 28 on the Billboard R&B albums chart. The album spawned four hit singles: "(You're My One and Only) True Love" (reaching No. 23 on Billboard's top 100 singles), "Two to Make It Right" (No. 2), "Heartbeat" (No. 13), and "Could This Be Love" (No. 11).

By the end of 1990, the album was certified gold by the RIAA. The album was produced by David Cole and Robert Clivilles.

== Track listing ==
Nothing Matters Without Love track listing
No.	Title	Writer(s)	Length
1.	"(You're My One and Only) True Love" (Lead vocals: Martha Wash (uncredited))	Robert Clivillés; David Cole; Fredrick Williams	3:50
2.	"Two to Make It Right" (Lead vocals: April Harris & Michelle Visage)	Cole	5:23
3.	"Could This Be Love" (Lead vocals: April Harris & Michelle Visage)	Clivillés	6:40
4.	"Breakdown" (Lead vocals: Michelle Visage & April Harris)	Clivillés; Cole; Williams	5:03
5.	"One Mistake" (Lead vocals: Idalis DeLeón)	Cole	5:41
6.	"Give My Love to You" (Lead vocals: April Harris)	Cole	3:59
7.	"Heartbeat (Extended Mix)" (Lead vocals: April Harris)	Kenton Nix	7:03
8.	"(Nothing Matters) Without Love" (Lead vocals: Michelle Visage)	Andy "Panda" Tripoli	5:07
9.	"Seduction's Theme" (Lead vocals: Carol Cooper (uncredited))	Clivillés; Cole	6:37

CD bonus track
No.	Title	Length
10.	"Could This Be Love" (Quiet Storm Mix)	6:21

== Charts ==
=== Weekly charts ===
Weekly chart performance for Nothing Matters Without Love
Chart (1989–1990)	Peak position
Australian Albums (ARIA)	142
New Zealand Albums (RMNZ)	37
US Billboard 200	36
US Top R&B/Hip-Hop Albums (Billboard)	28

=== Year-end charts ===
Year-end chart performance for Nothing Matters Without Love
Chart (1990)	Position
US Billboard 200	72
