= Seduction (group) =

Female dance-pop trio

- Origin: New York, New York, U.S.
- Genres: Dance; freestyle; urban contemporary; house; dance-pop
- Instrument: Vocals
- Years active: 1988–1991, 2003–present
- Label: A&M
- Members: April Harris-Holmes; Eunice Quiñones; Bianca Gonzalez
- Past members: Idalis DeLeón; Maria Flora; Sinoa Loren; Michelle Visage

Seduction is an American female dance-pop, house and freestyle trio from New York assembled and produced by Robert Clivillés and David Cole (later of C+C Music Factory), originally consisting of members April Harris, Michelle Visage, and Idalis DeLeón.

== History ==
Intended as a studio project, and prior to any assemblage of the aforementioned trio, the first track produced, "Seduction" (later renamed "Seduction's Theme" on their album), featured vocals by Carol Cooper, and was released to dance clubs and became a top 20 hit on the dance charts. The second single, "(You're My One and Only) True Love" featured uncredited vocals by Martha Wash. Against its producers' expectations, it ended up becoming a hit. Envisioning a potential hit phenomenon, Cole and Clivillés set to the task of assembling a group of women who displayed talent, sex appeal, and multi-format potential. Visage, DeLeon and Harris were assembled as a group to promote the single.

The group quickly recorded the album Nothing Matters Without Love and subsequent singles. Their biggest hit came in early 1990 with "Two to Make It Right" (featuring April and Michelle on Lead Vocals), a No. 2 pop hit. The hit music video was created and produced by the production team of Director Stu Sleppin and Producer Bob Teeman. In mid–1990, DeLeon left the group and was replaced by Sinoa Loren (born December 6, 1966). After a pair of hits with this lineup, the group disbanded in 1991. Harris owns the rights to the name Seduction and reassembled the group with two new members, Maria Flora and Eunice Foster, and released an album of new material, Feel Brand New, through AVH Entertainment (her own label) under the name Seduction in 2005.

== Discography ==
=== Studio albums ===
Year	Album details	Peak chart positions					Certifications
Year	Album details	US	US R&B	AUS	CAN	NZ	Certifications
1989	Nothing Matters Without Love: Release date: September 25, 1989; Label: Vendetta	36	28	142	48	37	RIAA: Gold
2004	Feel Brand New: Release date: September 21, 2004; Label: AVH Entertainment	—	—	—	—	—	
"—" denotes a recording that did not chart or was not released in that territory.

=== Remix albums ===
Year	Album details
1990	The Re-Mixes: Released: November 21, 1990; Label: A&M

=== Singles ===
Year	Single	Peak chart positions									Certifications	Album
Year	Single	US	US Dan	US R&B	AUS	CAN	FRA	GER	NZ	UK	Certifications	Album
1989	"Seduction"	—	17	—	—	—	—	—	—	87		Nothing Matters Without Love
1989	"(You're My One and Only) True Love" (Note: Song features lead and background vocals by Martha Wash.)	23	3	56	—	—	—	—	—	92		Nothing Matters Without Love
1989	"Two to Make It Right"	2	1	—	—	10	34	43	17	79	RIAA: Gold	Nothing Matters Without Love
1990	"Heartbeat"	13	2	21	169	47	—	—	23	75		Nothing Matters Without Love
1990	"Free Your Body"	—	2	—	—	—	—	—	—	—		Non-album song
1990	"Could This Be Love"	11	—	38	—	36	—	—	—	—		Nothing Matters Without Love
1990	"Breakdown"	82	4	—	162	—	—	—	—	—		Nothing Matters Without Love
1990	"Groove Me"	—	4	—	—	—	—	—	—	—		The Re-Mixes
2003	"All Night Long" (with Saddler)	—	—	94	—	—	—	—	—	—		Non-album song
2004	"Feel Brand New"	—	28	—	—	—	—	—	—	—		Feel Brand New
"—" denotes a recording that did not chart or was not released in that territory.
