= (You're My One and Only) True Love =

Single by Seduction

from the album Nothing Matters Without Love
- B-side: "Club Mix"
- Released: July 1989
- Recorded: 1989
- Genre: Dance-pop
- Length: 3:52 (7-inch single & album version); 6:29 (12-inch single)
- Label: A&M
- Songwriters: Robert Clivillés; David Cole
- Producers: Clivillés; Cole

Seduction singles chronology
"Seduction's Theme" (1989)	"(You're My One and Only) True Love" (1989)	"Two to Make It Right" (1989)

"(You're My One and Only) True Love" is a single by Seduction. Although uncredited, the lead vocals and background vocals were performed by Martha Wash, with additional background vocals by Seduction.

== Background ==
In 1989, Wash recorded a song "(You're My One and Only) True Love" as a demo, produced by David Cole who would later form the C+C Music Factory. Cole later gave the song to then-upcoming female group Seduction. The song appeared on Seduction's debut album Nothing Matters Without Love, released in September 1989, retaining the use of Wash's lead vocals and added Seduction's background vocals to the song. In addition, she was only credited for her background vocals and Cole remixed and altered Wash's lead vocals of the song to make her voice less recognizable on the song.

"(You're My One and Only) True Love" was released as Seduction's second single in July 1989. The single became an unexpected success when it peaked at number twenty-three on the Billboard Hot 100 chart and number three on the Dance chart. Wash would file a lawsuit against the producers and A&M Records for unauthorized use of her voice. The case reached an out-of-court settlement in December 1990.

== Track listing ==
7-inch single

1. "(You're My One And Only) True Love" - 3:46
2. "(You're My One And Only) True Love" (Underground Bonus Beats) - 4:00

12-inch single

1. "You're My One And Only (True Love)" (Club Mix) - 7:47
2. "You're My One And Only (True Love)" (Dub Mix) - 5:23
3. "You're My One And Only (True Love)" (Freedom's Here (with RC/DC)) - 6:40
4. "You're My One And Only (True Love)" (Underground Mix) - 5:04
5. "You're My One And Only (True Love)" (Hot Mix) - 3:47

Maxi single

1. "You're My One And Only (True Love)" (Club Mix) - 7:47
2. "You're My One And Only (True Love)" (New York House Mix 2) - 5:23
3. "You're My One And Only (True Love)" (The Hot 7" Mix) - 3:47

== Charts ==
Chart (1989)	Peak position
UK Singles (Official Charts Company)	92
US Billboard Hot 100 (Billboard)	23
US Dance Club Songs (Billboard)	3
US Hot R&B/Hip-Hop Songs (Billboard)	56
