= Michelle Visage =

American singer and television personality (born 1968)

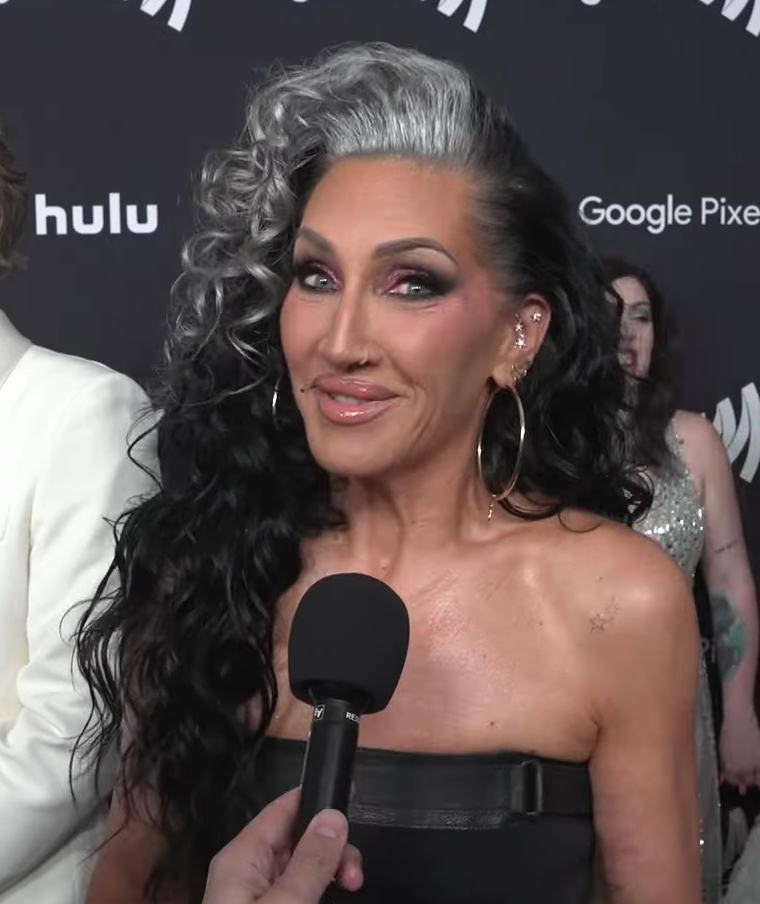
- Visage in 2024
- Born: Michelle Lynn Shupack; September 20, 1968 (age 58); Perth Amboy, New Jersey, U.S.
- Occupations: Singer; television personality; broadcaster; producer; actress
- Years active: 1988–present
- Television: RuPaul's Drag Race; Celebrity Big Brother; Ireland's Got Talent; Strictly Come Dancing; Queen of the Universe; RuPaul's Drag Race UK; Drag Race Down Under
- Spouse: David Case (m. 1997)
- Children: 2
- Musical career
- Genres: R&B; dance; pop
- Instrument: Vocals
- Formerly of: Seduction; The S.O.U.L. S.Y.S.T.E.M.
- Website: michellevisage.com

Michelle Lynn Shupack Case (née Shupack; born September 20, 1968), known professionally as Michelle Visage, is an American television personality, singer, broadcaster, producer, and actress. She gained recognition as a member of the dance-pop group Seduction, who charted five singles on the Billboard Hot 100 between 1989 and 1990. She later served as lead vocalist of the R&B and dance group The S.O.U.L. S.Y.S.T.E.M., who reached the top of the dance charts with the single "It's Gonna Be a Lovely Day" in 1993.

In 2011, Visage joined the American reality competition series RuPaul's Drag Race, and has served as a permanent judge since season three. She is also a permanent judge on its spin-off series RuPaul's Drag Race All Stars, RuPaul's Drag Race UK, RuPaul's Drag Race: UK vs. the World, and Drag Race Down Under, later becoming the host of the lattermost iteration and its vs. the World spin-off. She has won four Primetime Emmy Awards as an executive producer of RuPaul's Drag Race.

Visage was a contestant on the British reality shows Celebrity Big Brother (2015) and Strictly Come Dancing (2019), and was a judge on the talent competition show Ireland's Got Talent (2018–2019).

== Early life ==
Visage grew up in New Jersey. She was adopted and was aware of this from an early age. Visage, adopted by two Jewish parents, was raised Jewish. Her biological father was also Jewish, while her biological mother was a Catholic of Hungarian, Irish, and Italian descent. Despite living in a town without many Jewish people, her parents worked to make sure she could attend Hebrew school and have a bat mitzvah, as well as having a Catholic confirmation. She attended South Plainfield High School in South Plainfield, New Jersey, graduating in 1986.

When Visage was 16, she won a Madonna lookalike competition. She then moved to New York and attended the American Musical and Dramatic Academy in Manhattan for two years. Growing up, Visage looked up to Madonna, Belinda Carlisle, Pat Benatar, Stevie Nicks, Cyndi Lauper and Dale Bozzio. After finishing her studies she stayed in New York City to pursue a career as an actress.

In New York she was active in the club scene. Her mother Arlene gave her a fake ID so she could make connections to help further her career. Visage's mother died when she was 30. Visage became prominent in the New York drag ball scene and learned voguing from various people including Willi Ninja. She also became involved with Cesar Valentino and the pair appeared voguing together on the television show The Latin Connection in 1988, which they said was the first time voguing had appeared on national TV.

Michelle adopted her surname, Visage, after gaining the nickname "cara" ("face" in Spanish) from walking the face category while in the New York ball scene. However, because people pronounced it incorrectly she decided to change it to "visage" ("face" in French). She has kept the name since that time. Visage also met her future friend and co-star RuPaul for the first time in the late 1980s, when she attended club nights and parties hosted by Susanne Bartsch. In 1989, Visage performed at "The Love Ball", which was organized by Bartsch as a benefit for the Design Industries Foundation For AIDS. It is said that The Love Ball is where Madonna first witnessed voguing, the inspiration for her song "Vogue". During the day she worked as a receptionist at the shop Casablanca and Fundamental Things in the New York garment district.

== Career ==
=== Music recording and music videos ===
Visage auditioned and won a place for Seduction, an R&B and dance vocal trio assembled by Robert Clivilles and David Cole that signed with A&M Records in 1990. The group had several hits, the most famous being "Two to Make It Right". After the group's breakup, Visage collaborated with the freestyle dance act TKA as a guest vocalist on the song "Crash (Have Some Fun)". Visage provided lead vocals and was the recording artist of another dance act assembled by Clivilles and Cole, The S.O.U.L. S.Y.S.T.E.M. The song "It's Gonna Be a Lovely Day", which was a cover version of the Bill Withers song "Lovely Day", was included on the soundtrack to The Bodyguard. "It's Gonna Be a Lovely Day" became a number-one dance single and peaked at number 34 on the Billboard Hot 100 in January 1993.

Visage has also been featured on several of RuPaul's music albums, and appears in the music videos for "New York City Beat" and "From Your Heart", which originally premiered on RuPaul's Green Screen Christmas Special (2015), and were later uploaded to World of Wonder's YouTube channel. Visage has also made guest appearances in the videos for RuPaul's songs "Glamazon", "Responsitrannity", "The Beginning" and "Nothing for Christmas".

In February 2021, it was confirmed that Visage had teamed up with Steps on a reworked version of "Heartbreak in This City".

=== Radio and podcasts ===
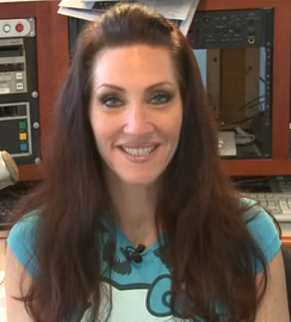
Visage in 2009 for CW News in West Palm, Florida

Visage was the co-host of the morning show on WKTU in NYC from 1996 to 2002 where she and co-host RuPaul started working together professionally. When RuPaul left radio, Visage continued on to many morning shows including: Hot 92 Jamz (KHHT) in Los Angeles between 2002 and 2005. In 2005, Visage returned to New York City, where she served as co-host of The Morning Mix on WNEW-FM until December 2006. She also hosted on Sirius Satellite Radio's The Beat 66 from 2003 to 2006 On March 12, 2007, she became a co-host of the morning show on SUNNY 104.3 in West Palm Beach, Florida. On January 10, 2011, she joined 93.9 MIA in Miami as the host of the new MIA Morning Show. She left Miami and MIA in December 2011, moving back to Los Angeles.

Visage started co-hosting the weekly podcast RuPaul: What's the Tee? on April 9, 2014. The pair interview celebrities and discuss many topics ranging from their personal lives to RuPaul's Drag Race. The podcast won a 2018 Webby Award. Visage also presented Michelle Visage's Fabulous Divas on BBC Radio 2, with episodes broadcast in December 2019 and August 2020. In October and November 2020, she covered for Rylan Clark on his BBC Radio 2 show and in February 2022 she covered for Dermot O'Leary on his Saturday weekend breakfast show. As of 15 July 2022, she has begun presenting her own show each Friday night from 7 until 9pm on BBC Radio 2. In February and March 2025 Michelle covered for Elaine Paige on Sunday.

=== Television ===
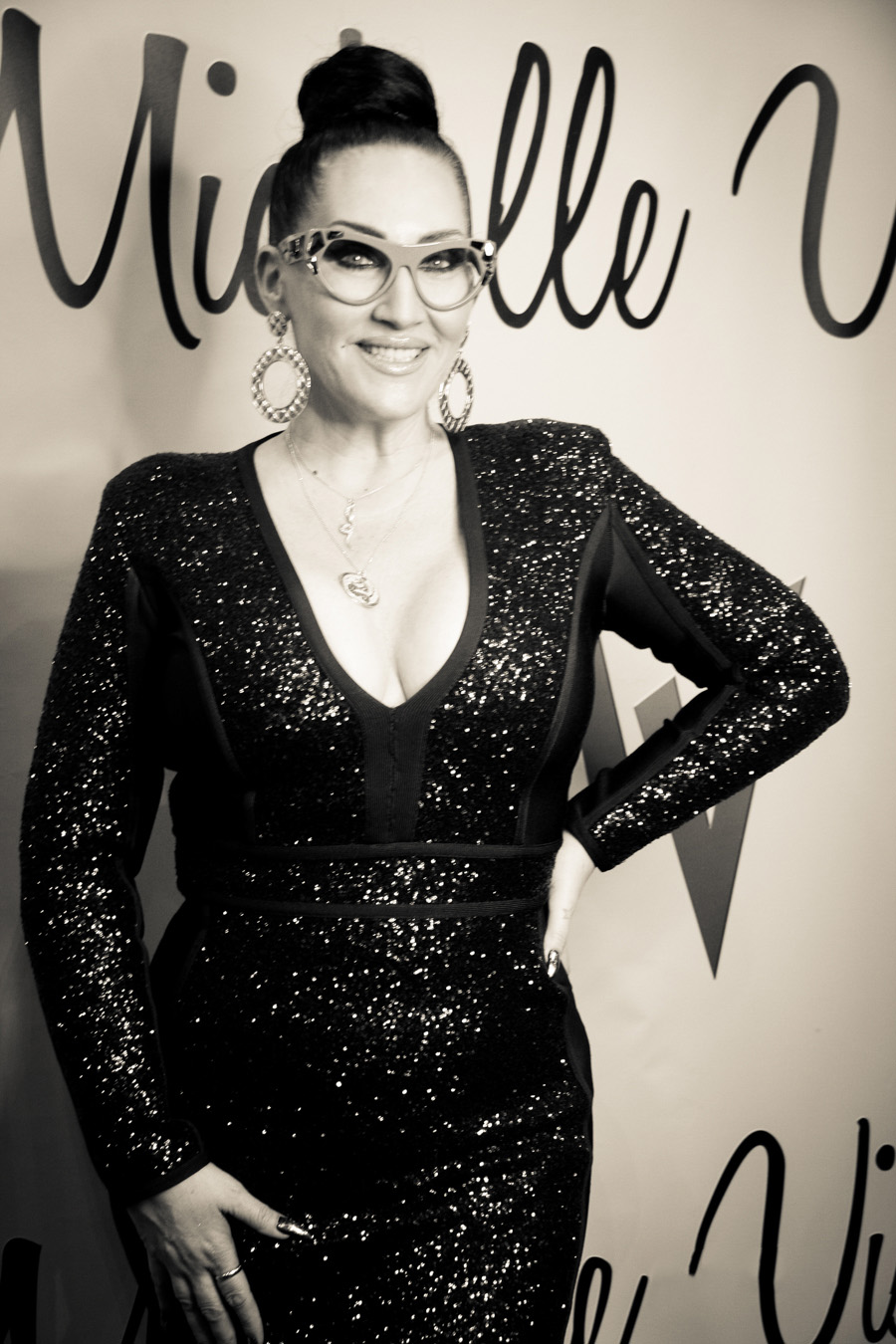
Visage at RuPaul's DragCon LA 2018

Visage has worked with RuPaul on a variety of television shows throughout her career. In 1996, she became the co-host of RuPaul's VH1 talk show The RuPaul Show. She also co-hosted WKTU's morning show with RuPaul from 1996 to 2002. When RuPaul began casting judges for season one of RuPaul's Drag Race, he invited Visage to become a permanent member of the show. At the time she was on a five-year contract with a CBS radio station in West Palm Beach; after asking her boss if she could join the show he said no, which Visage put down to the show's links with the LGBTQ community.

==== RuPaul's Drag Race ====
Two years later, Visage was contacted again by RuPaul and invited to appear on season three of the show. After her boss once again said she was not able to appear, she was persuaded by her friend Leah Remini to contact CBS officials who allowed her to join the show as a judge. On January 24, 2011, Visage debuted as a permanent judge, along with Santino Rice and Billy B, on season three of RuPaul's Drag Race, replacing Merle Ginsberg. She has also appeared on all eleven seasons of the spin-off show, RuPaul's Drag Race All Stars.

In 2019, she received her first Primetime Emmy Award for Outstanding Competition Program, having been a producer of Drag Race since its eleventh season. That same year, she became a judge on RuPaul's Drag Race UK, which airs on BBC Three. In 2021, Visage served as a judge on RuPaul's Drag Race Down Under.

In 2024, it was confirmed that Visage would be the permanent host on the fourth season of Drag Race Down Under, taking over for RuPaul who had hosted the first three seasons.

==== Other appearances ====
On January 7, 2015, Visage became one of the contestants on the fifteenth series of the British reality series Celebrity Big Brother on Channel 5. On February 6, 2015, Visage left the house in fifth place. Since leaving the house she has appeared on some episodes of Celebrity Big Brother's Bit on the Side, a companion show that airs straight after Celebrity Big Brother.

Visage has made several other TV appearances including hosting VH1's red carpet coverage of the 1998 Grammys and in 2002, Grease's 25th-anniversary re-release party. On May 13, 2017, she and Ross Mathews were the commentators for Logo TV's coverage of the Live Grand Final of the Eurovision Song Contest. More recently she has appeared as a judge on the first two seasons of Ireland's Got Talent, the first of which began airing on TV3 in February 2018. And in 2020, Visage joined fellow Ireland's Got Talent judge Louis Walsh on the judging panel of teen recycled-fashion competition Junk Kouture. She appeared on the televised Grand Final in February 2021, after the plans for the original live Grand Final were scuppered by COVID-19.

==== Strictly Come Dancing ====
On August 5, 2019, it was announced that Visage would be taking part in the seventeenth series of Strictly Come Dancing in the UK on BBC. On September 7, it was confirmed that she was partnered with Giovanni Pernice.

Week No.	Dance/Song	Judges' score				Total	Result
Week No.	Dance/Song	Horwood	Mabuse	Ballas	Tonioli (Note: In week 5 guest judge Alfonso Ribeiro replaced Tonioli)	Total	Result
1	Cha-Cha-Cha / "So Emotional"	8	8	7	7	30	No Elimination
2	Viennese Waltz / "That's Amore"	8	8	8	8	32	Safe
3	Quickstep / "Cabaret"	8	9	9	9	35	Safe
4	Salsa / "Quimbara"	7	8	8	8	31	Safe
5	Rumba / "Too Good at Goodbyes"	7	7	7	7	28	Safe
6	Foxtrot / "The Addams Family Theme"	9	10	10	10	39	Safe
7	Paso Doble / "Another One Bites The Dust"	8	9	9	8	34	Safe
8	American Smooth / "I Just Want to Make Love to You"	9	9	9	9	36	Bottom two
9	Street dance / "Vogue"	8	8	8	9	33	Eliminated

- Green number indicates Michelle & Giovanni were at the top of the leaderboard.
- Red number indicates Michelle & Giovanni were at the bottom of the leaderboard.

=== Theater ===
Visage performed in her West End debut as "Miss Hedge" in Everybody's Talking About Jamie between October 18, 2018, and January 26, 2019.

She played Morticia in the West End premiere of The Addams Family in concert opposite Ramin Karimloo as Gomez in February 2024.

== Personal life ==
In her early years, Visage had anorexia, which she says began when she was around 13 years old and continued into her adult life. Visage is vegan.

She lives in California with her husband, David Allen Case, whom she married in 1997, and her two children. On November 10, 2015, she published her first book, The Diva Rules.

On What's the Tee?, her podcast with RuPaul, Visage said that as an adult, she has had sex with men and women. "I've been with women; I've had sex with women... But I realized I never wanted to have a relationship [with them]."

In April 2019, Visage revealed she had Hashimoto's disease, and so had her breast implants removed.

== Discography ==
=== Albums ===
Album	Year	Group
Nothing Matters Without Love	1989	Seduction

=== Singles ===
Song	Year	Artist	Album
"Seduction Theme"	1989	Seduction	Nothing Matters Without Love
"(You're My One and Only) True Love"	1990	Seduction	Nothing Matters Without Love
"Two to Make It Right"	1990	Seduction	Nothing Matters Without Love
"Heartbeat"	1990	Seduction	Nothing Matters Without Love
"Could This Be Love"	1990	Seduction	Nothing Matters Without Love
"Breakdown"	1990	Seduction	Nothing Matters Without Love
"It's Gonna Be a Lovely Day"	1992	The S.O.U.L. S.Y.S.T.E.M.	The Bodyguard soundtrack
"Heartbreak in This City"	2021	Steps	What the Future Holds Pt. 2

=== Guest appearances ===
Song	Year	Artist	Album
"Crash (Have Some Fun)"	1991	TKA	Single
"Hard Candy Christmas"	1997	RuPaul	Ho, Ho, Ho
"With Bells On"	1997	RuPaul	Ho, Ho, Ho
"Let the Music Play"	2014	RuPaul	Born Naked
"Manila Radio (Interlude)"	2014	Manila Luzon	Eternal Queen
"New York City Beat"	2015	RuPaul	RuPaul Presents: CoverGurlz2
"L.A. Rhythm"	2015	RuPaul	Realness
"L.A. Rhythm" (Remix)	2015	RuPaul	Realness
"From Your Heart"	2015	RuPaul	Slay Belles
"Category Is..."	2016	RuPaul	Butch Queen

== Filmography ==
=== As herself ===
Year	Title	Notes
1989	Dance Party USA	
1990	Club MTV	
1996–1998	The RuPaul Show	Co-host
2011–present	RuPaul's Drag Race	Judge (season 3–present); Producer (season 11–present)
2011–present	RuPaul's Drag Race: Untucked	
2012–present	RuPaul's Drag Race: All Stars	Judge
2013	That Sex Show	
2014–present	Whatcha Packin'	Host; Web series
2015	Celebrity Big Brother 15	Housemate, 5th Place (Series 15)
2017	Eurovision Song Contest	Commentator for the United States
2018–2019	Ireland's Got Talent	Judge
2018	The X Factor	Simon Cowell's Judges Houses Guest (Series 15)
2019	The Only Way Is Essex	Cameo
2019	RuPaul	Guest
2019	Guest Grumps	Episode: "Playing Viva Pinata with Michelle Visage + Lillie"
2019	Strictly Come Dancing	Contestant; 7th place (Series 17)
2019–present	RuPaul's Drag Race UK	Judge (Series 1–present)
2020	How's Your Head, Hun?	Host
2020	Glow Up: Britain's Next Make-Up Star	Guest Judge (Series 2, Episode 4)
2020	Canada's Drag Race	Guest Host/Judge (Season 1, Episode 9)
2021	Ant & Dec's Saturday Night Takeaway	Star Guest Announcer
2021–present	RuPaul's Drag Race Down Under	Judge (Seasons 1–3); Host & Head Judge (Season 4–present)
2021	Celebrity Gogglebox for Su2c	Stand Up to Cancer special (Series 18, episode 5)
2021	The Wendy Williams Show	Guest (3 episodes)
2021–2023	Queen of the Universe	Judge
2022–present	RuPaul's Drag Race: UK vs. the World	Judge
2023	Survival of the Thickest	Recurring role
2024	RuPaul's Drag Race Global All Stars	Judge
2026	Drag Race Down Under vs. the World	Host & Head Judge

=== As an actress ===
Year	Title	Role	Notes
2002	Maybe It's Me	Tania	Film
2013–2015	The Most Popular Girls in School	Mrs. Zales	Web series
2018–2019	Everybody's Talking About Jamie	Miss Hedge	West End debut
2021	Dragging the Classics: The Brady Bunch	Helen	Television special
2021	The Bitch Who Stole Christmas	Narrator	Film
2023	Survival of the Thickest	Avery	Streaming series
2024	Smoggie Queens	Elaine	Episodes 2 & 6
2026	Stop! That! Train!	Reporter 1	Film

== Awards and nominations ==
=== Primetime Emmy Awards ===
Year	Category	Work	Result	Ref.
2019	Outstanding Competition Program	RuPaul's Drag Race (as producer)	Won	
2020	Outstanding Competition Program	RuPaul's Drag Race (as producer)	Won	
2021	Outstanding Competition Program	RuPaul's Drag Race (as producer)	Won	
2022	Outstanding Competition Program	RuPaul's Drag Race (as producer)	Nominated	
2022	Outstanding Short Form Nonfiction or Reality Series	RuPaul's Drag Race Whatcha Packin' with Michelle Visage	Nominated	
2023	Outstanding Reality Competition Program	RuPaul's Drag Race (as senior producer)	Won	
2024	Outstanding Reality Competition Program	RuPaul's Drag Race (as senior producer)	Nominated	
2025	Outstanding Reality Competition Program	RuPaul's Drag Race (as co-executive producer)	Nominated	
2026	Outstanding Reality Competition Program	RuPaul's Drag Race (as co-executive producer)	Nominated	

=== Miscellaneous awards and honors ===
Year	Award Show	Category	Work	Result	Ref.
2015	The Icon Awards	Straight Ally Award	Herself	Awarded	
2017	WOWIE Awards	Best Twitter	Herself	Won	
2017	WOWIE Awards	Best Podcast	RuPaul: What's the Tee?	Won	
2018	Webby Awards	Best Host (Podcast, as co-host)	RuPaul: What's the Tee?	Won	
2019	WOWIE Awards	Best Podcast	RuPaul: What's the Tee?	Won	
2019	WOWIE Awards	Best TV Moment	Strictly Come Dancing	Nominated	
2019	Critic's Choice Real TV Awards	Female Star of the Year	Herself	Nominated	
2019	Producers Guild of America Awards	Outstanding Producer of Game & Competition Television	RuPaul's Drag Race (as producer)	Won	
2020	Producers Guild of America Awards	Outstanding Producer of Game & Competition Television	RuPaul's Drag Race (as producer)	Won	
2020	British Academy Television Awards	Best Reality and Constructed Factual	RuPaul's Drag Race UK	Nominated	
2020	British LGBT Awards	Deutsche Bank – Celebrity Ally	Herself	Nominated	
2020	Queerty Awards	Drag Royalty	Herself	Nominated	
2020	Queerty Awards	Podcast	RuPaul: What's the Tee?	Runner-up	
2020	Attitude Awards	Ally Award	Herself	Awarded	
2020	Critics' Choice Real TV Awards	Female Star of the Year	Herself	Nominated	
2020	National Television Awards	Bruce Forsyth Entertainment Award	RuPaul's Drag Race UK	Nominated	
2021	Critics' Choice Real TV Awards	Female Star of the Year	Herself	Nominated	
2021	Producers Guild of America Awards	Outstanding Producer of Game & Competition Television	RuPaul's Drag Race (as producer)	Won	
2021	National Television Awards	Talent Show	RuPaul's Drag Race UK	Nominated	
2022	WOWIE Awards	Best TV Moment	The Wendy Williams Show (with Leah Remini)	Nominated	
2022	WOWIE Awards	Best Documentary	Explant	Won	
2022	British Academy Television Awards	Best Reality and Constructed Factual	RuPaul's Drag Race UK	Nominated	
2022	National Television Awards	Talent Show	RuPaul's Drag Race UK	Nominated	

== See also ==
- List of Celebrity Big Brother (British TV series) housemates
- List of Strictly Come Dancing contestants
