= Hitman (2007 film) =

2007 film by Xavier Gens

- British theatrical release poster
- Directed by: Xavier Gens
- Written by: Skip Woods
- Based on: Hitman by IO Interactive
- Produced by: Daniel Alter; Adrian Askarieh; Luc Besson; Chuck Gordon
- Starring: Timothy Olyphant; Dougray Scott; Olga Kurylenko
- Cinematography: Laurent Barès
- Edited by: Carlo Rizzo; Antoine Vareille
- Music by: Geoff Zanelli
- Production companies: 20th Century Fox; EuropaCorp; Anka Film; Daybreak Productions; Dune Entertainment; Prime Universe Productions; IO Interactive
- Distributed by: 20th Century Fox (Worldwide); EuropaCorp Distribution (France)
- Release dates: November 21, 2007 (United States); November 30, 2007 (United Kingdom); December 26, 2007 (France)
- Running time: 92 minutes
- Countries: France; United States; United Kingdom
- Languages: English; Russian
- Budget: $24 million
- Box office: $101.3 million

Hitman is a 2007 action-thriller film based on the video game series by IO Interactive. It was directed by Xavier Gens, written by Skip Woods, and produced by Luc Besson. Timothy Olyphant stars as Agent 47, a professional hitman engineered to be an assassin by the Organization. He becomes ensnared in a political conspiracy and finds himself pursued by both Interpol and the FSB. Dougray Scott and Olga Kurylenko star in supporting roles.

An international co-production between France, the United States and the United Kingdom, Hitman was released by 20th Century Fox in the US on November 21, 2007, followed by the UK on November 30 and France on December 26. The film received mostly negative reviews from critics, who criticized its convoluted plot but praised Olyphant's performance. Despite this, the film was a box office success, grossing $101.3 million against a $24 million budget. A sequel was canceled during the film's production due to its mostly negative reception, but the film was eventually followed by the reboot Hitman: Agent 47 in 2015.

== Plot ==
Inside a heavily guarded facility, a group of young boys are given tattoos of bar codes on the backs of their shaved heads and are then trained in weapons, demolitions, unarmed combat, stamina, and strength to become professionally trained hitmen who operate around the globe. In the present day, Interpol agent Mike Whittier arrives home and is met at gunpoint by Agent 47. The two talk about 47's life as a professional hitman, raised and trained by a clandestine group known simply as the Organization.

Three months prior to that, 47 is completing a hit on a Nigerien warlord named Bwana Ovie. In a subsequent change of plans, 47 is told by his Organization handler, Diana Burnwood, that he is to kill his next target, Russian president Mikhail Belicoff, publicly instead of privately. Agent 47 completes his mission by shooting the man in the head, but before he can leave Russia, he is contacted by his superiors. He is mystified when told the hit was a failure and that Belicoff survived the attack on his life. The Organization notifies him of a witness to the assassination and orders him to intercept and kill her. However, when 47 realizes she has never seen him before, he does not shoot her; instead, he narrowly avoids an assassination attempt on himself by another agent and realizes he is being set up.

His employers send his location and identity to the FSB, but Diana secretly calls 47 and tips him off, revealing that Belicoff himself had ordered the hit. After escaping from his hotel, 47 intercepts Nika, Belicoff's mistress and the woman who supposedly witnessed his hit. He interrogates her and discovers that Belicoff had a double, who ordered the hit on the real Belicoff in order to take his place as the president of Russia. The Organization, hoping to gain influence with the new government, ordered 47 to kill Nika and then set him up to be erased and thus cover their tracks.

Nika and 47, attempting to leave Russia by train, are pursued by Organization agents, whom 47 subdues and kills in a sword fight. Whittier then attempts to arrest 47 himself, only to be easily overpowered. Nika persuades 47 to let Whittier go free, and Whittier is forced to leave Russia by FSB officer Yuri Marklov, who is overseeing the manhunt, for interfering. 47 contacts his associate, CIA officer Carlton Smith, to offer him a deal: 47 will kill Udre Belicoff (Mikhail's brother and a wealthy arms dealer and human trafficker) in exchange for a favour. Smith informs 47 that Udre had been planning something with a German gunrunner named Price.

47 and Nika travel to Istanbul, where 47 abducts Price, poses as him to meet Udre at a club, and kills him, forcing Belicoff's double to attend Udre's public funeral. 47 kidnaps Marklov and forces him to order his own agents to disrupt the funeral and create a distraction while 47, disguised as a soldier, deals with the imposter's bodyguards and kills him before Whittier arrives with backup from Interpol to take him into custody. Smith delivers on his end of the deal and has his operatives intercept the convoy that is transporting 47 to the airport, allowing the hitman to escape.

Back in Whittier's home, 47 threatens Whittier into notifying the police that he has killed (a fake) Agent 47. Nika is seen picking up an envelope containing the deed to a vineyard, a dream of hers to own. Agent 47 is watching her from afar, through the scope of a sniper rifle. Looking at the corpse of another agent lying at his feet, he muses that he had warned him (meaning the Organization) to leave her alone, and then walks away.

== Cast ==
- Timothy Olyphant as Agent 47: An orphaned child, taken in and trained by the Organization to become a professionally trained, internationally operating hitman for hire.
  - Borislav Parvanov as Young Agent 47
- Dougray Scott as Mike Whittier: An Interpol agent who has been tracking Agent 47 for quite some time and finally confronts his mysterious target.
- Robert Knepper as Yuri Marklov: Lead agent of an FSB force. He joins in the chase to capture Agent 47.
- Olga Kurylenko as Nika Boronina: Mikhail Belicoff's mistress who is swept into companionship with Agent 47 as events unfold.
- Ulrich Thomsen as Mikhail Belicoff and his body double: The President of Russia. He is targeted by Agent 47 as a mark early on in the film.
- Henry Ian Cusick as Udre Belicoff: An international criminal wanted by the CIA and the FSB, while protected by his brother Mikhail Belicoff, who is President of Russia.
- Michael Offei as Jenkins: Whittier's right-hand man at Interpol.
- James Faulkner as Carlton Smith: A CIA agent who helps Agent 47 evade Interpol.
- Eriq Ebouaney as Bwana Ovie
- Émil Abossolo-Mbo as General Ajunwa
- Lisa Jacobs as Diana Burnwood
- Sabine Crossen as June: A young woman who tries to seduce Agent 47 at a bar.
- Susan White as Mia
- Asen Blatechki as FSB Driver
- Vladimir Kolev as HRT Guy
- Desislava Bakardzhieva as Female News Reporter

== Production ==
=== Development ===
In February 2003, Hitman makers Eidos and IO Interactive entered negotiations with Hollywood production companies to adapt the video game to film. 20th Century Fox eventually acquired the rights and hired screenwriter Skip Woods to pen the screenplay, with actor Vin Diesel executive producing and starring in the film.

=== Casting ===
In December 2006, Diesel stepped down from the role. In January 2007, Olyphant was cast as the lead with director Xavier Gens at the helm. In March, actor Dougray Scott was cast as Agent 47's nemesis, with Olga Kurylenko, Robert Knepper, Ulrich Thomsen, and Michael Offei also joining the cast.

=== Filming ===
Principal photography began the week of March 27, 2007 in Sofia, Bulgaria and lasted 12 weeks. A second unit also shot in locations including London, Istanbul, St. Petersburg, and Cape Town.

The release of the film was set back a few months to allow for the re-shooting of several scenes. These included a sword fight between four assassins in a train car, which replaced the original train platform sequence where Agent 47 fought only one assassin. Reports before the film's release confirmed that not only were reshoots taking place, but that Fox had fired Gens and denied him final cut. Nicolas de Toth was brought in at this stage to soften the edit and cut down material.

47's origins were also changed at this stage, with a decision to add footage from the TV series Dark Angel, which was also owned by Fox, in an effort to save money. Gens told an interviewer that whilst they are not directly dealing with the clone storyline, one scene (the original train station sequence) showing a bald, barcoded assassin (Jean-Marc Bellu) following Agent 47 (Olyphant), another bald, barcoded assassin, is very explicit and showed his intention to keep him as a clone. The detail was likely changed to accommodate for the casting of actors of multiple races during reshoots, making it impossible for them to be clones (or at least clones of the same person).

Olga Kurylenko revealed she refused to have a body double for her sex scenes.

== Release ==
=== Box office ===
Hitman was originally slated to be released on October 12, 2007, in the United States and Canada, but the film's release was postponed to November 21, 2007. Hitman opened in 2,458 theaters in the United States and Canada, grossing $13,180,769 in its opening weekend, ranking fourth at the box office. The following weekend, Hitman opened in 12 markets, having the following highlights: $150,355 in 38 theaters in Indonesia, $224,449 in 37 theaters in Malaysia. and $244,329 in 32 theaters in the Philippines. In Taiwan, the film opened in fourth place with approximately $100,000. The film also performed weakly in Lebanon with $19,321 in 6 theaters. As of March 13, 2008, the film has grossed $39,687,694 in the United States and Canada and $60,278,098 in other territories for a worldwide total of $99,965,792, exceeding its estimated $24 million budget. The DVD sales equal $27,858,148 in the US alone, putting the total gross for Hitman at around $128 million, not counting television airing rights.

=== Critical response ===
On Rotten Tomatoes the film holds an approval rating of 16% based on 104 reviews, with an average rating of 3.9/10. The website's critics consensus reads, "Hitman features the unfortunate combination of excessive violence, incoherent plot, and inane dialogue." On Metacritic, it has a weighted average score of 35 out of 100 based on 22 critics, indicating "generally unfavorable" reviews. Audiences surveyed by CinemaScore gave the film an average grade of "B" on an A+ to F scale.

Critics found fault with several aspects of the film, including a weak and often confusing plot, dry acting, and extreme violence. Roger Ebert notably gave it a positive, three-stars-out-of-four review, and said "Hitman stands right on the threshold between video games and art. On the wrong side of the threshold, but still, give it credit". In 2008, Time listed the film on their list of top ten worst video game movies.

Despite Hitman's mostly negative reception, Slovenian philosopher and film theorist Slavoj Žižek included the film in his personal list of 10 greatest films in a 2012 poll conducted by the Sight & Sound magazine. Commenting on his picks, he said the list contains "only 'guilty pleasures'" and he made "no compromises for high quality or good taste".

=== Home media and streaming release ===
An unrated version of Hitman was released in the high-definition Blu-ray format on March 11, 2008, and features extras including deleted scenes, an alternate ending and a gag reel. This version also features a special digital copy of the film which can be transferred to a portable media device like an iPod. A standard-definition DVD was released on the same date in three versions. A single-disc theatrical version, a single-disc unrated version, and an unrated special edition including many extras, and the digital copy mentioned above. The unrated DVD is one minute longer than the theatrical cut and includes a few extended scenes with more blood. The UK version of the film was available on Blu-ray and DVD from 31 March 2008.

The French Blu-ray version of the film came with 10 deleted scenes, accompanied with French audio commentary by Xavier Gens. Some of the scenes included are the original assassination, in which Ovie survives, is taken to hospital only to be killed via lethal injection by 47 disguised as a doctor; the alternate train platform sequence which features no sword fight, as well as showing the older assassin biting off his tongue to avoid giving answers to 47; and an extended departure sequence between 47 and Nika, which shows Yuri and his men stopping their train and boarding it to look for 47.

An alternate ending in the special features of the DVD shows 47 watching Nika through his sniper scope as she opens the envelope. She then turns down a corner of a small street to be shot dead in a drive-by, possibly by men loyal to the organization behind the fake Belicoff, all while 47 watches.

In 2019, Rupert Murdoch sold most of 21st Century Fox's film and television assets to Disney, and Hitman, as well as its 2015 reboot Agent 47, were among two of the many films included in the deal. As such, and in an effort to appeal to mature audiences instead of just family audiences, Hitman was one of the very first R-rated films released on Disney+ in the United States on April 2022, but the decision was eventually dropped by the time it became available in Canada instead.

== Reboot ==
IESB had confirmed that 20th Century Fox hired writer Kyle Ward to pen the script for the sequel to Hitman. Adrian Askarieh, Daniel Alter and Chuck Gordon were to return as producers. American actor David Hess, who died in October 2011, had been reported to have an as-yet-unnamed role. Daniel Benmayor had signed to direct the sequel. Olyphant stated on the Nerdist podcast that he had no interest in returning for a sequel and only did the original film in order to pay for his new house following the sudden cancellation of Deadwood.

On February 5, 2013, it was reported that the film would be rebooted with the title of the film being Hitman: Agent 47, and would have starred Paul Walker as Agent 47 prior to his death on November 30, 2013, with commercials director Aleksander Bach making his feature film debut helming the project. The screenplay was written by Skip Woods and Mike Finch. Shooting was expected to take place in Berlin and Singapore in summer 2013. On January 9, 2014, actor Rupert Friend was in talks to replace Walker as the character. On January 31, 2014, actor Zachary Quinto was cast in an unnamed role. On February 6, 2014, actress Hannah Ware was cast in the female lead role. On February 19, 2014, production on film began filming with Friend as Agent 47.

The film was theatrically released in the United States on August 21, 2015, and was panned by critics, even further than the original film, receiving even worse ratings than the 2007 movie.

== See also ==
- List of films based on video games
