= Jerry Hoffmann =

German actor

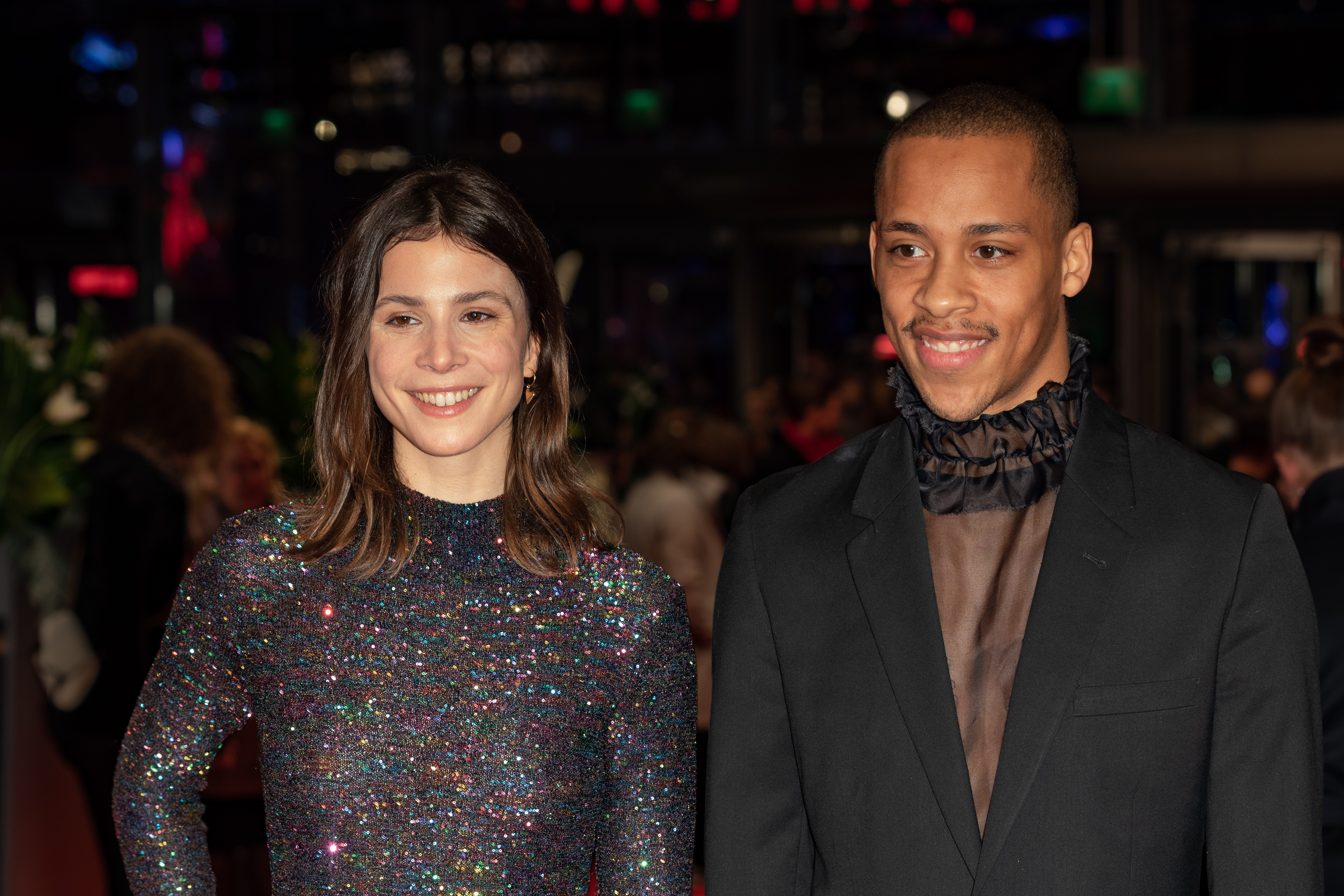
- Aylin Tezel and Jerry Hoffmann
- Born: Jerry Hoffmann; 30 May 1989 (age 36); Hamburg, West Germany
- Occupations: Actor, Director, Writer
- Notable work: Hitman: Agent 47; Yakamoz S-245; I Am
- Awards: Martha's Vineyard African-American Film Festival; Filmtage Friedrichshafen

Jerry Hoffmann (born 30 May 1989) is a German actor, writer and director. He is known for Hitman: Agent 47 and Yakamoz S-245.

== Life and career ==
Hoffmann was born in Hamburg. He made his début at the age of 18 in the film Shahada, in the major role of Samir. The film had its world première at the 2010 Berlin International Film Festival and won awards both in Germany and at various film festivals abroad.

He began drama studies in 2009 at the Otto Falckenberg School of the Performing Arts in Munich and continued at the Berlin University of the Arts. Before completing his training he had been seen in a number of stage and screen productions. For example, beginning in 2011 he appeared with Martin Wuttke and Margit Carstensen in Schmeiß dein Ego weg at the Volksbühne.

In the film Wir sind wieder wer, he plays a young member of the American occupying force who falls in love with a German (Henriette Confurius). The film received the 2012 No Fear Award at the First Steps Awards.

In the miniseries Zeit der Helden, produced by Westdeutscher Rundfunk and Arte, Hoffmann plays a nurse who has a relationship with his co-worker (played by Jasna Fritzi Bauer). The series won the Deutscher Fernsehpreis for Best Series in 2013 and the Grimme-Preis in 2014.

In 2013, he was selected as a talent at the Berlinale Talents. In the ARD two-parter Grzimek, featuring Ulrich Tukur, Barbara Auer and Katharina Schüttler, he plays Grzimek's adoptive son, Thomas.

Hoffmann has a part in the 20th Century Fox action film Hitman: Agent 47 (2015), with Rupert Friend, Hannah Ware, and Zachary Quinto. In the stage play I call my brothers, Hoffmann plays the lead role of Amor; the production received invitations to the 2014 Radikal jung Festival in Munich and the 2014 International Theater Festival in Belo Horizonte.

Jerry successfully applied for the prestigious Fulbright Scholarship, and then went on to study Film and TV production at the Loyola Marymount University in Los Angeles with an emphasis on writing & directing. Jerry’s first short CELINE was a 360-degree immersive experience tackling linear storytelling in virtual reality. Accepted onto the Hamburg Media School he completed his studies in 2020 with an MFA. His various shorts, including MALL and 90%, have been very well received. Both premiered at the Max Ophüls Festival, one the most important Film festivals for upcoming filmmakers in Germany, and have been shown at various international film festivals.

His thesis movie I AM, A sci-fi thriller with two female black leads, has been awarded with the HBOMax Best Short Film Award at the St. Martha’s Vineyard African-American Film Festival, was nominated for the Student Academy Awards and Qualified for the Academy Awards 2022.

In addition he can be seen in a leading role in the dystopian Turkish Netflix series Yakamoz S-245 that launched globally on April 20, 2022.

== Filmography ==
- Shahada (2010), as Sammi
- Wir sind wieder wer (2011), as Sgt. Charlie Murdoch
- Nemez (2012), as Buddy
- Zeit der Helden (2012, TV series), as Steve
- Ein weites Herz – Schicksalsjahre einer deutschen Familie (2013), as American Soldier
- Grzimek (2014), as Thomas Grzimek
- Heil (2015), as Sebastian Klein
- Hitman: Agent 47 (2015), as Franco
- Needle Park Baby (2019), as André
- The Witchprincess (2020), as Prince Tanka
- Yakamoz S-245 (2022, TV series), as Felix
- Falling Into Place (2023), as Jann

== Theatre ==
- 2013: Ich rufe meine Brüder
- 2011: Schmeiß dein Ego weg
