= Paulina Porizkova =

Model and author (born 1965)

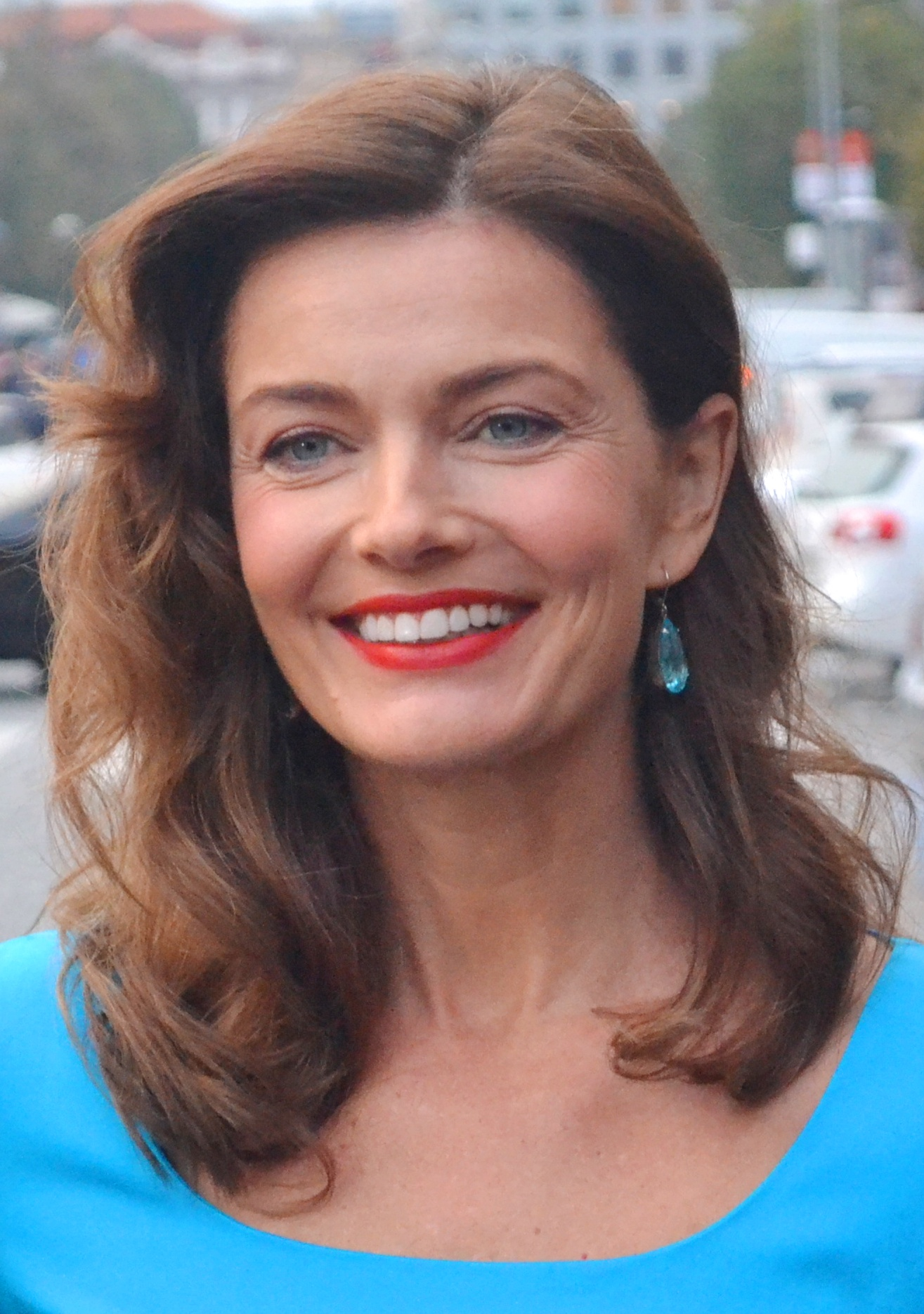
- Porizkova in 2014
- Born: 9 April 1965 (age 61); Prostějov, Czechoslovakia
- Citizenship: Sweden; U.S.
- Occupations: Model; author; actress
- Spouse(s): Ric Ocasek (m. 1989; died 2019) (Note: Porizkova and Ocasek had separated in 2017 and filed for divorce, but Ocasek died before the divorce could be finalized.) Jeff Greenstein (m. 2026)
- Children: 2
- Modeling information
- Height: 1.80 m (5 ft 11 in)
- Agency: The Model CoOp (New York); Premium Models (Paris); IMG Models (Milan); Models 1 (London); Traffic Models (Barcelona); Place Models (Hamburg)

Paulina Porizkova (Czech: Pavlína Pořízková [ˈpavliːna ˈpor̝iːskovaː]; born 9 April 1965) is a fashion model, author and actress. In 1984, she became the first Central European woman to appear on the cover of the Sports Illustrated swimsuit issue.

Born in Prostějov, Czechoslovakia, Porizkova immigrated to Sweden as a child and began modelling in Paris at the age of 15. After immigrating to the United States, she made her film debut in the comedy drama Anna (1987).

== Early life ==
Porizkova was born to anti-Soviet dissidents Anna Pořízková and Jiří Pořízka on 9 April 1965 in Prostějov, then part of Czechoslovakia and now part of the Czech Republic. After her parents moved to Sweden to escape the 1968 Warsaw Pact invasion, she was left in the care of her maternal grandmother. Czechoslovakia's communist government would not allow the couple to reclaim Porizkova, and the ensuing battle was widely publicized in the Swedish press, making her a cause célèbre.

When Porizkova was seven years old, a pregnant Anna returned to Czechoslovakia with a fake passport in a failed attempt to rescue her, after which the latter was briefly detained by the national police and then was placed under house arrest with her family. In 1973, international political pressure led by Swedish prime minister Olof Palme caused the Czechoslovak authorities to allow the Pořízka family to be reunited.

Anna and Jiří divorced after the latter had an affair. Porizkova and Jiří, who refused to pay child support for her and her younger brother, have been estranged since her youth. Anna, a midwife, remarried at least twice and, as of 2010, was reported to be serving in the Peace Corps in Uganda.

== Career ==
=== Modeling ===
External images
- Porizkova's Sports Illustrated Swimsuit Issue cover from 13 February 1984
- Porizkova's Sports Illustrated Swimsuit Issue cover from 11 February 1985

Porizkova shared the photo that got the attention of modeling scout John Casablancas. She was 13. One of her friends, who wanted to be a makeup artist, painted Porizkova's face, along with other friends, and sent the photographs to modeling agencies in Paris in the hopes of getting hired. "Soon after, a modeling agent called inviting me to Copenhagen to meet the famed model scout John Casablancas. ... He took one look at me and asked: 'Want to go to Paris?' As if I'd say no! The rest, as they say, is history."

Porizkova rose to become a top model in Paris during the early 1980s. She appeared as a model in Sports Illustrated in 1983, and in 1984, at 18 years old, she became the first woman from Central Europe to be on the cover of the swimsuit issue. She appeared again on the cover in 1985. She was the second woman (after Christie Brinkley) to be featured on the swimsuit issue's front cover in consecutive years (1984 and 1985). She appeared on the cover of New York magazine in July 1985. Harper's Bazaar named her one of its ten most beautiful women in 1992 and American Photo magazine in its first issue declared her to be the model of the 1980s. Porizkova appeared on the covers of numerous magazines around the world during the 1980s and 1990s, including Vogue, Elle, Harper's Bazaar, Self, Cosmopolitan, and Glamour.

She has been featured in advertising campaigns for Chanel, Versace, Hermes, Christian Dior, Oscar De La Renta, Mikimoto, Perry Ellis, Laura Biagiotti, Anne Klein, Ellen Tracy, Barneys New York, Ann Taylor, Guerlain, and Revlon and appeared on the runway for Calvin Klein.

In 1988, Porizkova won what was then the highest-paying modeling contract: a $6,000,000 contract with Estée Lauder, replacing Willow Bay. The black-and-white television and print advertising campaign won praise from critics. The Estée Lauder makeover transformed Porizkova's public image from a swimsuit model to that of European sophisticate and she remained the company's face until 1995. She soon landed another multimillion-dollar contract, with Escada.

=== Television work ===
Porizkova was part of the panel of judges on America's Next Top Model (ANTM), starting on Cycle 10, replacing fashion icon Twiggy.

Porizkova continued to conduct regular weekly evaluations of ANTM participants on the show until she announced during a 12 May 2009, appearance on The Late Late Show with Craig Ferguson that she had been fired from the show. Although Porizkova maintained she was told by producers that she had an "ego problem," especially when she "consistently complained" about Tyra Banks' reported lateness to the set, ANTM executive producer Ken Mok and Banks released a statement claiming Porizkova's firing was due to "the current state of the economy," forcing ANTM to "make major budget cuts…unfortunately, Paulina was a casualty of these cuts." When questioned by ABC News journalist Cynthia McFadden about the firing of Porizkova as well as former ANTM colleague, Janice Dickinson, both of whom had complained Banks was "difficult," Banks refused to address the issue.

She appeared on Andy Warhol's Fifteen Minutes.

Porizkova was a participant on the fourth season of Dancing with the Stars in spring 2007, but was voted off on the first results show which aired on 27 March 2007.

In 2009 and 2010, she played Clarissa on about five episodes of the CBS Daytime soap opera As the World Turns. Porizkova appeared in the fourth episode of Celebrity Ghost Stories' second season.

=== Acting ===
Porizkova's film debut was in the 1983 modeling mockumentary, Portfolio. She appeared in the 1987 film Anna. In 1989, she co-starred with Tom Selleck in the film Her Alibi; she was nominated for a Golden Raspberry Award for Worst Actress for her appearance.

Porizkova appeared in Emir Kusturica's 1993 film Arizona Dream, with Johnny Depp and Jerry Lewis, in a minor role as Lewis's young Polish fiancée. She had the main female role in the 1998 film Thursday. Porizkova wrote and directed the 2001 film, Roommates. She also starred in the 2001 thriller film Dark Asylum, alongside Judd Nelson. In 2004, she starred in the romantic comedy Knots. She appeared in an episode of the Starz comedy series Head Case which aired on 24 April 2009. She appeared in a 6th-season episode of Desperate Housewives, "Chromolume No. 7", alongside model Heidi Klum. She appeared on the ABC Family drama-comedy series Jane by Design in an episode which aired on 6 March 2012, and made a guest appearance on The Mysteries of Laura in February 2015.

=== Writing ===
Porizkova co-authored a children's book, The Adventures of Ralphie the Roach (ISBN 978-0385424028) with British model Joanne Russell and illustrated by her stepson Adam Ocasek, that was published in September 1992. She published her first novel, A Model Summer (ISBN 978-1401303266; Modellsommar in Swedish), in 2007, which is about a 15-year-old Swedish girl (Jirina) chosen by a modeling agent to spend a summer working in Paris in 1980. Porizkova is a blogger for Modelinia and The Huffington Post. She published a memoir-in-essays titled No Filter: The Good, the Bad, and the Beautiful on 15 November 2022.

== In popular culture ==
Porizkova is the subject of three songs: "Friends of P" by The Rentals, "Paulina" by No Doubt, and "Dear Paulina" (written for the film Thursday in which she appeared) by Luna. She is one of several women referenced in Sonic Youth's song "Swimsuit Issue", from the 1992 album Dirty. She was the inspiration of the late transgender model and ballroom performer Octavia St. Laurent who spoke glowingly about her in the documentary film Paris is Burning. She has said that St. Laurent's praise and idolization in the documentary was the favorite moment of her modeling career.

== Personal life ==
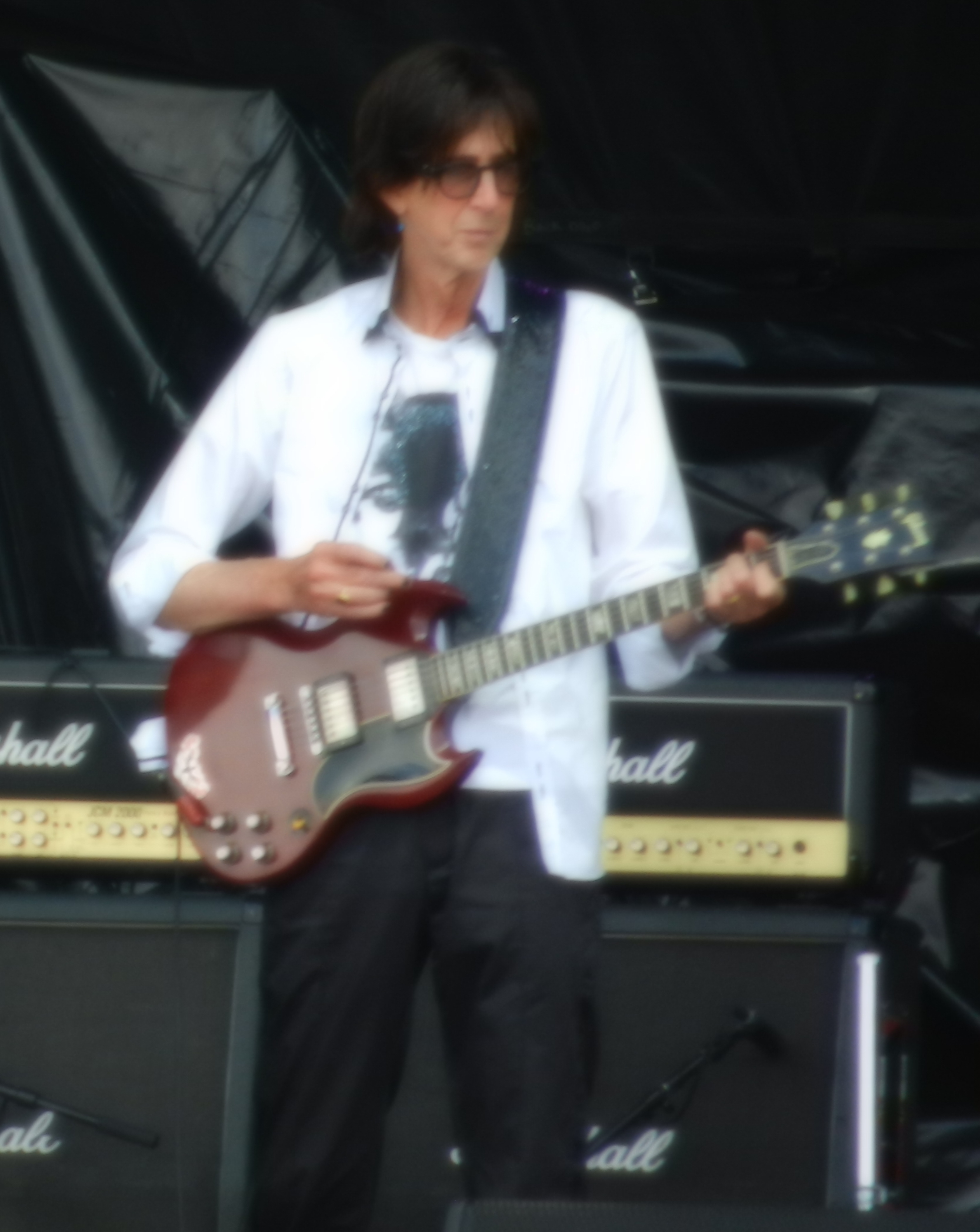
Porizkova's longtime husband, musician Ric Ocasek in 2011

Porizkova holds dual Swedish and U.S. citizenship. In 1984, she met Ric Ocasek, lead singer of the rock band the Cars, during the filming of their music video "Drive". The two married on 23 August 1989. They had two sons, Jonathan Raven Ocasek (born 4 November 1993) and Oliver Ocasek (born 1999). In May 2018, Porizkova announced she and Ocasek had separated a year earlier.

In September 2019, while caring for Ocasek following an unspecified surgery, Porizkova found him dead in his home. At the time of his death, they were still in the process of their divorce. In a new will, he had disinherited her and his two eldest sons (from his first wife), claiming that before his recent surgery she had abandoned him (a legally significant claim). In 2021, her dispute with Ocasek's estate was settled. Porizkova commented, "They gave me what is mine under New York state law, and we're done." She later stated that she had received a third of their joint assets.

In 2021, Porizkova briefly dated screenwriter Aaron Sorkin. Since February 2023, she has been in a relationship with screenwriter Jeff Greenstein. In July 2025, she announced that the two were engaged. They married in July of 2026.

In "America Made Me a Feminist", an article she wrote for The New York Times in 2017, Porizkova stated that she considered herself a feminist.

== Filmography ==
Film
Year	Film	Role	Notes
1987	Anna	Krystyna	
1989	Her Alibi	Nina Ionescu	
1993	Arizona Dream	Millie	
1996	Female Perversions	Langley Flynn	
1996	Wedding Bell Blues	Tanya Touchev	
1998	Long Time Since	Diane Thwaite	
1998	Thursday	Dallas	
2000	The Intern	Chi Chi Chemise	
2001	Dark Asylum	Dr. Maggie Bellum	
2004	Knots	Lily Kildear	
2012	About Face: The Supermodels, Then and Now	Herself	Documentary
2017	Kevyn Aucoin Beauty & The Beast in Me	Herself	Documentary
2026	O Horizon	Zuzana	
2026	Bardotky	Valerie	
Television
Year	Title	Role	Notes
1987	Saturday Night Live	Herself	"Bronson Pinchot" (season 12: episode 11)
2008–2010	America's Next Top Model	Judge	Judge for cycles 10–12
2009–2010	As the World Turns	Clarissa	
2010	Desperate Housewives	Herself	
2010	Celebrity Ghost Stories	Herself	
2013	RuPaul's Drag Race	Herself	"Draggle Rock" (season 5: episode 3)
2015	The Mysteries of Laura	Charlotte Bernice	
2016	Nightcap	Ana	
2017	Bull	Nella Wester	Episode: "Dressed to Kill"
2022	Beyond the Edge	Herself	
Music Videos
Year	Title	Role	Notes
1984	"Drive"	Herself	
1984	"Cold Blood"	Herself	

== Bibliography ==
- "America Made Me a Feminist". The New York Times, 10 June 2017
- A Model Summer. Hyperion, 8 April 2008
- No Filter: The Good, the Bad, and the Beautiful. 15 November 2022

== See also ==
- List of Sports Illustrated Swimsuit Issue cover models
