= Betrayal (American TV series) =

2013 American drama television series

- Genre: Drama
- Based on: Overspel by: Frank Ketelaar; Robert Kievit
- Developed by: David Zabel
- Starring: Hannah Ware; Henry Thomas; Wendy Moniz; Chris Johnson; Braeden Lemasters; Elizabeth McLaughlin; Stuart Townsend; James Cromwell
- Composers: Brian Transeau; Michael DiMattia
- Country of origin: United States
- Original language: English
- No. of seasons: 1
- No. of episodes: 13

Production
- Executive producers: Alon Aranya; David Zabel; Frank Ketelaar; Rob Golenberg; Robert Kievit
- Running time: 60 minutes
- Production companies: Remainder Men Productions; Scripted World Productions; Omroepvereniging VARA; ABC Studios

Original release
- Network: ABC
- Release: September 29, 2013 – January 19, 2014

Betrayal is an American drama television series that aired on ABC from September 29, 2013, to January 19, 2014. The series was developed by David Zabel and starred Hannah Ware. It is based on the Dutch drama series Overspel, broadcast by VARA. The pilot episode was directed by Patty Jenkins. Betrayal joined ABC's Sunday line-up after ABC's dramas, Once Upon a Time and Revenge. On May 9, 2014, ABC canceled Betrayal after one season.

== Premise ==
The series stars Hannah Ware as photographer Sara Hanley who begins an affair with Jack McAllister (played by Stuart Townsend), a lawyer for a powerful family. Both married to other people, Jack and Sara find themselves drawn to one another. The premise also revolves a murder trial which involves both of them on separate sides, complicating matters further.

== Cast and characters ==
=== Main ===
- Hannah Ware as Sara Hanley
- Henry Thomas as T.J. Karsten
- Wendy Moniz as Elaine McAllister
- Chris Johnson as Drew Stafford
- Braeden Lemasters as Victor McAllister
- Elizabeth McLaughlin as Valerie McAllister
- Stuart Townsend as Jack McAllister
- James Cromwell as Thatcher Karsten

=== Recurring ===
- Helena Mattsson as Brandy Korskaya
- Ora Jones as Quincy Theringer
- Merrin Dungey as Alissa Barnes
- Brendan Hines as Aidan
- Roxana Brusso as Serena Sanguillen
- Sofia Black-D'Elia as Jules
- Carmen Roman as Constance Mrozek

== Episodes ==
No.	Title	Directed by	Written by	Original release date	U.S. viewers (millions)
1	"Pilot"	Patty Jenkins	David Zabel	September 29, 2013	5.16
2	"...Except When the Bear is Chasing You"	Michael Morris	David Zabel & Lisa Zwerling	October 6, 2013	3.90
3	"If You Want the Fruit..."	Constantine Makris	David Zabel & Lisa Zwerling	October 13, 2013	2.88
4	"...That is Not What Ships Are Built For"	Jim McKay	Paul Davies & David Zabel	October 20, 2013	3.51
5	"...Nice Photos"	Stephen Cragg	Yahlin Chang	October 27, 2013	3.30
6	"...The Things That Drive Men Crazy"	Paul McCrane	Julia Cho	November 3, 2013	3.44
7	"...We're Not Going to Bailey's Harbor"	Michael Morris	Joe Hortua	November 10, 2013	3.20
8	"...One More Shot"	Stephen Cragg	Alison Tatlock	November 17, 2013	3.39
9	"It's Just You and Me Now..."	Bethany Rooney	David Zabel & Lisa Zwerling	December 8, 2013	3.05
10	"...Number 16"	Andrew Bernstein	Paul Davies	December 15, 2013	3.60
11	"...The Karsten Way"	John Scott	Yahlin Chang	January 5, 2014	3.38
12	"Sharper Than a Serpent's Tooth..."	Stephen Herek	Julia Cho & Joe Hortua	January 12, 2014	2.74
13	"...A Better Place"	David Zabel	David Zabel & Lisa Zwerling	January 19, 2014	3.31

== Broadcast ==
The show premiered in South Africa on M-Net on Saturday 19 October 2013 at 20:30. The Republic of Ireland's public service broadcaster RTÉ Television's RTÉ Two broadcasts the series at 22:00 every Tuesday from October 29, 2013. On August 29, 2013, it was announced that Channel 5 had bought the UK rights to the series, which it began airing Friday 18 April 2014. Italy's public service broadcaster RAI 1 broadcast the series from July 25, 2014, with the title of the show being translated literally as Tradimenti. In Australia on Network Seven the series was broadcast from November 23, 2015.

== Ratings ==
No.	Title	Air date	Rating/share (18–49)	Viewers (millions)	DVR (18–49)	DVR Viewers (millions)	Total (18–49)	Total viewers (millions)
1	"Pilot"	September 29, 2013	1.2/4	5.16	—N/a	—N/a	—N/a	—N/a
2	"...Except When the Bear Is Chasing You"	October 6, 2013	1.1/3	3.90	—N/a	—N/a	—N/a	—N/a
3	"If You Want the Fruit..."	October 13, 2013	0.8/2	2.88	—N/a	—N/a	—N/a	—N/a
4	"...That Is Not What Ships Are Built For"	October 20, 2013	0.9/2	3.51	—N/a	—N/a	—N/a	—N/a
5	"...Nice Photos"	October 27, 2013	0.9/2	3.30	—N/a	—N/a	—N/a	—N/a
6	"...The Things That Drive Men Crazy"	November 3, 2013	1.0/3	3.44	—N/a	—N/a	—N/a	—N/a
7	"...We're Not Going to Bailey's Harbor"	November 10, 2013	0.8/2	3.20	—N/a	—N/a	—N/a	—N/a
8	"...One More Shot"	November 17, 2013	0.9/2	3.39	—N/a	—N/a	—N/a	—N/a
9	"It's Just You and Me Now..."	December 8, 2013	0.7/2	3.05	TBA	TBA	TBA	TBA
10	"...Number 16"	December 15, 2013	0.8/2	3.60	TBA	TBA	TBA	TBA
11	"...The Karsten Way"	January 5, 2014	0.7/2	3.38	TBA	TBA	TBA	TBA
12	"Sharper Than a Serpent's Tooth..."	January 12, 2014	0.8/2	2.74	TBA	TBA	TBA	TBA
13	"...A Better Place"	January 19, 2014	0.7/2	3.31	TBA	TBA	TBA	TBA
