= Swordfish (film) =

2001 thriller movie directed by Dominic Sena

- Theatrical release poster
- Directed by: Dominic Sena
- Written by: Skip Woods
- Produced by: Joel Silver; Jonathan D. Krane
- Starring: John Travolta; Hugh Jackman; Halle Berry; Don Cheadle; Vinnie Jones; Sam Shepard
- Cinematography: Paul Cameron
- Edited by: Stephen E. Rivkin
- Music by: Christopher Young; Paul Oakenfold
- Production companies: Village Roadshow Pictures; NPV Entertainment; Silver Pictures
- Distributed by: Warner Bros. Pictures
- Release date: June 8, 2001
- Running time: 99 minutes
- Country: United States
- Language: English
- Budget: $102 million
- Box office: $147.1 million

Swordfish is a 2001 American action-thriller film directed by Dominic Sena, written by Skip Woods, produced by Joel Silver, and starring John Travolta, Hugh Jackman, Halle Berry, Don Cheadle, Vinnie Jones, and Sam Shepard.

Stanley Jobson is an ex-con and computer hacker who is recruited into a bank robbery conspiracy.

Swordfish was released by Warner Bros. Pictures on June 8, 2001. The film received mostly negative reviews, and grossed over $147.1 million in worldwide box office receipts on a production budget of $102 million.

== Plot ==
Cyber-hacker Stanley Jobson becomes notorious for infecting the FBI's Carnivore program with a computer virus. Stanley's parole forbids him from accessing the internet and computers while his ex-wife, Melissa, an alcoholic and part-time porn star, issued a restraining order against him. This also prevents him from seeing his daughter, Holly.

Ginger Knowles persuades Stanley to work for Gabriel Shear, who forces him into cracking a secure Defense Department server. After the hack, Gabriel offers Stanley $10 million to program a multi-headed worm, a "hydra", to siphon $9.5 billion from the government slush funds.

Stanley begins work on the worm, learning that Gabriel leads Black Cell, a secret organization created by J. Edgar Hoover to attack terrorists that threaten the United States. He also privately discovers Ginger is a DEA agent working undercover and is further surprised to discover a corpse that resembles Gabriel.

After taking Holly home from school, Stanley discovers he is being followed by FBI agent J.T. Roberts, who had previously arrested him. Roberts, though monitoring Stanley, is more interested in Gabriel as he does not appear on any government database, and after learning that another hacker, Axl Torvalds, was killed by Gabriel's men, warns Stanley to be cautious.

Stanley opts to secretly code a backdoor in his hydra that reverses the money transfer after a short period. Meanwhile, Senator Jim Reisman, who oversees Black Cell, learns the FBI started tracking Gabriel and orders him to stand down. He refuses and defeats a hit team dispatched against him by Reisman. In retaliation, Gabriel continues with the plan and kills Reisman.

Stanley delivers the hydra to Gabriel and leaves to spend time with Holly, only to find that Gabriel's men abducted her and framed him for the murders of Melissa and her porn producer husband. He is then forced to participate in a bank heist to get Holly back.

At the site of the heist, Gabriel and his men storm a branch and secure its employees and customers as hostages, fitting each of them with ball-bearing-based explosives similar to Claymore mines. When police and FBI surround the branch, Gabriel takes Stanley to a nearby coffee shop across the street to meet with Roberts, but Gabriel spends the time discussing the film Dog Day Afternoon and the nature of misdirection.

In the bank, Gabriel has one of his men escort a hostage out to demonstrate how they are rigged with explosives, so a sharpshooter kills the man. As other agents start to pull the hostage away from the bank, the bomb detonates, pulverizing her and much of the street.

Gabriel instructs Stanley to launch the hydra and turns Holly over to him once completed. However, the back door triggers before they can leave the bank, leading to Stanley being recaptured while Holly is rescued. Gabriel threatens to kill Ginger, whom he knows is a DEA agent, unless Stanley re-siphons the money back to a Monte Carlo bank. Although Stanley complies, Gabriel shoots down Ginger.

Gabriel and his men load the hostages onto a bus and demand a plane wait for them at the local airport, but while en route, the bus is lifted off by a Sikorsky S-64 Skycrane and carried across the city. The bus is then deposited on the roof of a skyscraper, where Gabriel deactivates the bombs and attempts to escape with his surviving men on a waiting helicopter. Stanley shoots down the helicopter using a rocket-propelled grenade (RPG) that Gabriel's men had left on the bus.

Roberts takes Stanley to verify a corpse they found, believing Gabriel was a Mossad agent. There is no record of a DEA agent named Ginger Knowles, and her body was not found. Stanley recognizes the corpse as the one he discovered earlier and realizes that the whole scenario was a deception; Ginger was wearing a bulletproof vest and was working with Gabriel all along, who escaped via a different route.

Despite Stanley not telling the police that Gabriel and Ginger are still alive, Roberts arranges for Stanley to have full custody of Holly, where they depart to places elsewhere.

In Monte Carlo, Gabriel and Ginger, now in new disguises, withdraw the stolen money and later watch as a yacht at sea explodes. A news report reveals the destruction of the yacht, carrying a known terrorist, as the third such incident in weeks.

== Cast ==
- John Travolta as Gabriel Shear
- Hugh Jackman as Stanley "Stan the Man" Jobson
- Halle Berry as Ginger Knowles
- Don Cheadle as FBI Agent J.T. Roberts
- Sam Shepard as Senator James Reisman
- Vinnie Jones as Marco
- Drea de Matteo as Melissa
- Rudolf Martin as Axl Torvalds
- Zach Grenier as FBI Assistant Director Bill Joy
- Camryn Grimes as Holly Jobson
- Angelo Pagan as Torres
- Kirk B. R. Woller as Axl's Lawyer
- Carmen Argenziano as Agent
- Tim DeKay as FBI Agent
- Laura Lane as Helga
- William Mapother as Gabriel’s Crew

== Production ==
The opening explosion was the most complicated visual effect in the film. It was shot using "Matrix-like effects" by Frantic Films. The effect has so many composites in it that the producers and director Dominic Sena could not determine what was real and what was created by computer. The dramatic explosion at the start of the film was captured using 135 synchronized still cameras.

== Reception ==
Swordfish received early press coverage because word leaked out that Halle Berry was doing her first topless scene. Berry received $2.5 million for her role. Contrary to popular belief, Berry was not paid an extra $500,000 to go topless. Critics said the scene looked forced, just to garner press. "Halle Berry Nude" jumped to the top of search engine results. Berry said she did the topless scene, knowing it was gratuitous, to overcome the fear of appearing nude onscreen.

As of 2024, 26% of the 139 reviews compiled on Rotten Tomatoes are positive, with an average rating of 4.35/10. The website's critical consensus reads: "Swordfish is big on explosions, but critics dislike how it skimps on plot and logic. Also, the sight of a person typing at a computer just isn't that interesting." Metacritic, which uses a weighted average, assigned the film a score of 32 out of 100, based on 33 critics, indicating "generally unfavorable" reviews. Audiences polled by CinemaScore gave the film an average grade of "B" on an A+ to F scale.

In a review for The Washington Post, Desson Howe described the film as "an action opera designed to elicit Beavis and Butt-head-level appreciation, rather than effete applause from the critics".

In a review for The New York Times, Stephen Holden described the film as "a meticulously choreographed bang-by-the-numbers action fantasy that I would accuse of peddling evil if the film weren't so dumb and incoherent", concluding that:

With its blasé blend of bogus international intrigue and action-for-action's-sake, Swordfish suggests a James Bond movie stripped of humor. True, there are a few moments of wit, like the opening sequence. But the dominant tone masquerading as humor is a snide, rancid nihilism devoid of laughs, unless wholesale destruction and gloating stupidity are what tickle your funny bone.

The film grossed over $147 million in worldwide box office receipts on a production budget of $102 million. John Travolta's performance in the film earned him a Razzie Award nomination for Worst Actor (also for Domestic Disturbance).

The film's hacking scenes have consistently been highlighted in retrospectives for their highly unrealistic 3D user interface.

== Soundtrack ==
The soundtrack was produced by Paul Oakenfold, under Village Roadshow and Warner Bros. and distributed through London Sire Records, Inc. It contains 15 tracks. The film's orchestral score was written by Christopher Young with several electronic additions by Paul Oakenfold. Fragments from the score were added to the official soundtrack but were remixed by Oakenfold. A more complete release was issued as an award promo, which is known for its rarity.

== Rodney Cox myth ==
The Rodney Cox myth is an urban legend which purports that a man, whose name is sometimes given as Robert Cox, was personally executed by U.S. President Thomas Jefferson for treason. There is no substantive evidence that Cox existed or that Jefferson personally executed anybody, yet the urban legend has persisted. The rumor seems to originate from Swordfish, which presents the story.
