= The First (TV series) =

2018 British-American TV drama series

- Genre: Science fiction Drama
- Created by: Beau Willimon
- Starring: Sean Penn; Natascha McElhone; LisaGay Hamilton; Hannah Ware; Keiko Agena; Rey Lucas; James Ransone; Anna Jacoby-Heron; Brian Lee Franklin; Oded Fehr; Norbert Leo Butz; Annie Parisse; Melissa George; Jeannie Berlin; Bill Camp; Ana Lucia Souza
- Composer: Colin Stetson
- Countries of origin: United States; United Kingdom
- Original language: English
- No. of seasons: 1
- No. of episodes: 8

Production
- Executive producers: Beau Willimon; Jordan Tappis
- Producers: Joseph Incaprera; Peter Chomsky
- Cinematography: Adam Stone
- Camera setup: Single-camera
- Running time: 45–48 minutes
- Production companies: Westward; Endeavor Content

Original release
- Network: Hulu (US); Channel 4 (UK)
- Release: September 14, 2018

The First is an American-British science fiction drama television series, about a team of astronauts who prepare to become the first humans to visit Mars. It was created by Beau Willimon and stars an ensemble cast including Sean Penn, Natascha McElhone, LisaGay Hamilton, Hannah Ware, Keiko Agena, Rey Lucas, James Ransone, Anna Jacoby-Heron, Brian Lee Franklin, Oded Fehr, Norbert Leo Butz, Annie Parisse, Melissa George, Jeannie Berlin, and Bill Camp.

The series, a co-production between American streaming service Hulu and British television network Channel 4, debuted on September 14, 2018, in the United States and on November 1, 2018 in the United Kingdom. On January 18, 2019, Hulu canceled the series after one season.

== Premise ==
The First follows the planning of "the first human mission to Mars, while exploring the challenges of taking the first steps toward interplanetary colonization. The story focuses not only on the astronauts, but also on their families and loved ones, as well as the ground team on Earth."

== Cast and characters ==
=== Main ===
- Sean Penn as Tom Hagerty, one of five astronauts chosen to be the first people to visit Mars.
- Natascha McElhone as Laz Ingram, the CEO of commercial launch provider Vista. Julia Badinger portrays a young Laz in a recurring role.
- Anna Jacoby-Heron as Denise Hagerty, Tom's estranged daughter struggling with drug addiction.
  - Eden Grace Redfield as young Denise Hagerty in a recurring role.
- LisaGay Hamilton as Kayla Price, one of five astronauts chosen to be the first people to visit Mars. Mikaela Kimani Armstrong portrays a young Kayla in a guest appearance in the episode "Cycles".
- Hannah Ware as Sadie Hewitt, one of five astronauts chosen to be the first people to visit Mars.
- Keiko Agena as Aiko Hakari, one of five astronauts chosen to be the first people to visit Mars.
- Rey Lucas as Matteo Vega, one of five astronauts chosen to be the first people to visit Mars.
- James Ransone as Nick Fletcher, one of five astronauts chosen to be the first people to visit Mars.
- Brian Lee Franklin as Lawrence, the father of Laz Ingram.
- Oded Fehr as Eitan Hafri, the leading Vista scientist
- Norbert Leo Butz as Matthew Dawes, an astronaut killed while leading a previous mission.
- Annie Parisse as Ellen Dawes, Matthew's wife.
- Melissa George as Diane Hagerty, Tom's wife.
- Jeannie Berlin as President Cecily Burke
- Bill Camp as Aaron Shultz, a journalist.
- Ana Lucia Souza as the ballet dancer.

=== Recurring ===
- T. C. Matherne as Jason
- D. W. Moffett as Robert Cordine
- Tracie Thoms as Nancy, Kayla's wife
- Fernanda Andrade as Camila Rodriguez
- Patrick Kennedy as Ollie Bennett, Sadie's husband
- Anthony Marble as Engineer #1
- Kelly Murtagh as Engineer #2
- Amber Patino as Amanda Ingram
- Alex Rubin as Devon Ingram
- John "Spud" McConnell as Senator Thibodeaux
- Scott Takeda as Todd
- Sharon Omi as Edith
- Miguel Najera as Mr. Castillo
- Sol Miranda as Mrs. Castillo
- Billy Slaughter as Vista Lawyer
- Cara Ronzetti as Myk
- Devyn Tyler as Samantha
- Fallon Katz as Charlotte Dawes
- Marcus Lyle Brown as Launch Director
- Galen Lee as Aiko's Son #1
- Asher Lee as Aiko's Son #2

== Episodes ==
No.	Title	Directed by	Written by	Original release date
1	"Separation"	Agnieszka Holland	Beau Willimon	September 14, 2018
In 2031 New Orleans, Louisiana, the crew of Providence 1, the first crewed mission to Mars, board their capsule for the journey to Mars. Commander Tom Hagerty, the original mission commander, watches the launch on television, via national telecast, at his New Orleans house, not from Mission Control. The launch is a disaster, the rocket malfunctions and the crew are all killed. Hagerty races to Vista headquarters (a private sector company in New Orleans, that is jointly running the mission in coordination with NASA), to provide support for family members and confronts Vista CEO Laz Ingram. Hagerty returns home to find Denise, his estranged teenaged daughter, who has come to reunite with him after watching the horrifying launch. Vista opens an investigation to determine what caused the fatal launch disaster.
2	"What's Needed"	Agnieszka Holland	Beau Willimon	September 14, 2018
Laz Ingram testifies in front of Congress in favor of continuing the crewed space mission to Mars, while simultaneously settling a legal battle with the families of the Providence 1 crew. Denise has begun working as a waitress and wishes to use her late mother's tattoo studio, which Tom has locked up and is resistant to allow her in. He begins preparing the studio when he receives a call from Ingram to travel to Washington, DC to testify in support of another attempt at crewed exploration to Mars. Tom refuses to speak in favor of another mission in front of Congress, but meets privately with the parents of the late Providence 1 commander and explains the need to continue exploring space. Over the next few days, Tom and Ingram gradually gain support for another mission. On the flight home, Ingram offers Tom the chance to command the next mission and he asks Denise if he should go.
3	"Cycles"	Daniel Sackheim	Carla Ching	September 14, 2018
Tom, the new commander of the mission to Mars, is arguing with Kayla, the previous commander, as to who he will bump for his spot on the mission, Nick or Sadie. Tom is in favor of Nick, while Kayla argues on behalf of Sadie, as she feels personally responsible for Sadie becoming an astronaut. After Sadie fails a training exercise, Tom makes his decision that he will take her place. The Mars Ascent Vehicle, already on Mars, is no longer transmitting, causing concern that it may be inoperative when the crew arrives. Denise goes out with some of her coworkers, including her love interest Finn. After bringing them back to Tom's house, he confronts her with his concerns that she will relapse into her drug use and attends a twelve-step meeting with her.
4	"Where Life Is"	Daniel Sackheim	AJ Marechal	September 14, 2018
As the crew continues training, Laz speaks privately to Kayla and asks if she thinks they made the right decision to take Nick instead of Sadie on the mission. Kayla becomes angry at Laz and feels that she is not a respected member of the crew. Speaking about the matter with her wife and Tom, she admits that much of her frustration is from being replaced as mission commander. As the crew trains, Nick struggles with the science portion and is assisted by Sadie. Sadie, while pretending that she wants to get pregnant, has been secretly taking birth control pills. She admits this to her husband, who suspected it all along and she realizes she has been avoiding pregnancy because she is holding out hope that she will still be on the mission. Tom and Ellen, the wife of the late Providence 1 commander, sleep together; Denise is upset with her father for bringing her into her art studio. Laz visits the bar at which Denise works and offers her support while her father is away; Denise angrily rebuffs her attempt. While working at home, Laz identifies a possible solution to fix the Mars Ascent Vehicle.
5	"Two Portraits"	Deniz Gamze Ergüven	Francesca Sloane	September 14, 2018
As Denise paints a portrait of her late mother, Diane, a series of flashbacks reveal the family's history. Tom is shown to have been away during his Navy career and struggled with parenting Denise when he returned home. He moved the family to their house in New Orleans, but Diane continued to struggle and eventually committed suicide in the river by their house as Denise watched. Tom insisted that Denise go to New York for school, where she began abusing drugs and eventually overdosed. Tom enrolled her in rehab, but she relapsed after returning home, angering Tom and forcing her to leave. Due to Tom's struggles with his home life, he was replaced as Providence 1 mission commander. In the present, Denise destroys her portrait of her mother and goes to a party, where she relapses into drugs.
6	"Collisions"	Deniz Gamze Ergüven	Julian Breece	September 14, 2018
Denise wakes up in a jail cell, after she was injecting drugs at a party that was broken up by the police. She calls Laz, who takes her to Tom's house and recalls Tom from a training simulation. Tom and Denise argue about what she should do, culminating in Denise staying in Laz's guesthouse. A reporter interviews Laz about the Providence 2 mission, where she acknowledges the risks of the mission, and states that it is the price of exploration. Despite unsuccessful tests, Laz has the reporter view the research in repairing the Mars Ascent Vehicle.
7	"The Choice"	Ariel Kleiman	Christal Henry	September 14, 2018
Tom drafts a letter for the crew to sign acknowledging the increased risk to their lives should the repairs to the Mars Ascent Vehicle fail. Matteo notices hearing issues and finds that his eardrum has ruptured. The repairs fail and the US president informs Laz that she will not be supporting the mission and the crew considers the increased risk. Matteo chooses to withdraw from mission and Sadie replaces him, despite her husband's anger at her decision. Tom meets Denise at Laz's house and she informs him that she will be cutting off contact should he elect to go on the mission, to protect herself from heartbreak. Tom asserts that she no longer needs him, but the crew does, and signs the letter.
8	"Near and Far"	Ariel Kleiman	Francesca Sloane & Beau Willimon	September 14, 2018
The crew of Providence 2 prepare for launch. Denise is resistant to attend, but eventually decides to view the launch. Providence 2 takes off and successfully docks with the Mars Transfer Vehicle in orbit. Denise returns to Tom's house to close up her studio and move out, but she decides to send Tom a video before she departs. The series ends as the crew prepares for the trans-Mars injection burn.

== Production ==
=== Development ===
On May 3, 2017, Hulu and Channel 4 had given the production a straight-to-series order. The show was created by Beau Willimon who was also set to write for the series and executive produce alongside Jordan Tappis. Production companies involved with the series were slated to consist of Westward Productions. The series reportedly has been given a budget of around $54.6 million. On July 16, 2018, it was reported that the series would premiere on September 14, 2018 on Hulu in the United States. On October 22, 2018, it was reported that the series would premiere on November 1, 2018 on Channel 4 in the United Kingdom. On January 18, 2019, Hulu canceled the series after one season.

=== Casting ===
In September 2017, Sean Penn and Natascha McElhone were cast as the series' leads. In October 2017, it was reported that LisaGay Hamilton, Oded Fehr, James Ransone, and Hannah Ware had also joined the main cast. On November 3, 2017, Anna Jacoby-Heron was cast in a series regular role.

=== Filming ===
The series was set to finish pre-production and enter principal photography on September 18, 2017 in New Orleans, Louisiana. The shoot was scheduled to last about 85 days though it was later reported that the series would film in the city through March 9, 2018.

== Release ==
=== Marketing ===
On July 16, 2018, a series of "first look" images from the series were released. On July 24, 2018, a teaser trailer for the series was released. On August 28, 2018, the official trailer for the series was released.

=== Premiere ===
On June 9, 2018, creator/executive producer Beau Willimon appeared at the annual ATX Television Festival where he discussed the series and debuted a "first look" at the series through a short trailer featuring narration from cast member Sean Penn. On September 7, 2018, the series took part in the 12th annual PaleyFest Fall Television Previews, which featured a preview screening of the series.

== Reception ==
=== Critical response ===
The series was met with a mildly positive response from critics upon its premiere. On the review aggregation website Rotten Tomatoes, the series holds an approval rating of 68% with an average rating of 6.3 out of 10, based on 59 reviews. The website's critical consensus reads, "Sean Penn gives an intensely poignant performance as the driven but conflicted Tom Hagerty in The First's rather slow-moving first season." Metacritic, which uses a weighted average, assigned the series a score of 61 out of 100 based on 28 critics, indicating "generally favorable reviews".

John Anderson of the Wall Street Journal wrote: "This is not a space show, or at least it won't be till the end of the season. But it does what it does with a high degree of intelligence. ... There's nothing pedestrian about The First, though. It orbits high above the cable traffic." Matt Zoller Seitz of New York Magazine notes that some have given the series negative reviews and says "Not all of the series' risks pay off, and the overall approach is so counterintuitive that it's bound to frustrate audiences who expected more of a problem-solving space mission story along the lines of Apollo 13 or The Martian." But gives the series a positive review saying "it weaves a spell that's somewhere between a '90s John Wells drama (think ER or The West Wing) and a slowed-down TV answer to Terrence Malick (The Tree of Life especially)."

Willa Paskin of Slate.com wrote: "The First is a glossy, often-inert tale of devotion and spaceflight. Its first two episodes treat inevitabilities as questions, and unfold with the zip of a DVR-ed sporting event for which you already read the box score. ... But The First does get better after its first two episodes (before getting worse again) by jettisoning inevitability. ... As flawed as I found the first season, I'll admit, it hooked me enough that I'm interested to see how they live life on Mars." Alan Sepinwall of Rolling Stone wrote: "The First is under no burden to be as quippy or feel-good as The Martian, as awestruck as The Right Stuff, as gee-whiz as Apollo 13 or From the Earth to the Moon. But it needs to have some compelling reason to tell this story, in this way, and it never really finds one."

=== Awards and nominations ===
Year	Award	Category	Nominee(s)	Result	Ref.
2019	Visual Effects Society Awards	Outstanding Supporting Visual Effects in a Photoreal Episode	Karen Goulekas, Eddie Bonin, Roland Langschwert, Bryan Godwin, & Matthew James Kutcher (for "Near and Far")	Nominated	
2019	Golden Reel Awards	Broadcast Media: Short Form Effects / Foley	Brian Armstrong, Thomas DeGorter (supervising sound editors); Owen Granich-Young, Patrick O'Sullivan (sound designers); Michael S. Head, Geordy Sincavage (foley editors) (for "Near and Far")	Nominated	

== See also ==
- Away
- Mars
