= Skip Woods =

American filmmaker

- Born: Houston, Texas, U.S.
- Occupations: Screenwriter, film director, film producer

Skip Woods is an American filmmaker. He has primarily worked in the action genre as the writer of the films Swordfish (2001), Hitman (2007), and A Good Day to Die Hard (2013), in addition to co-writing X-Men Origins: Wolverine (2009) and The A-Team (2010). Woods also wrote and directed the black comedy crime thriller Thursday (1998).

== Personal life ==
Woods lives in Houston, Texas.

== Filmography ==
Year	Title	Director	Writer	Producer
1998	Thursday	Yes	Yes	Co-producer
2001	Swordfish	No	Yes	Co-producer
2007	Live Free or Die Hard	No	Uncredited	No
2007	Hitman	No	Yes	No
2009	X-Men Origins: Wolverine	No	Yes	No
2010	The A-Team	No	Yes	No
2013	A Good Day to Die Hard	No	Yes	Executive
2014	Sabotage	No	Yes	Executive
2015	Hitman: Agent 47	No	Yes	Yes
