= Ana Lúcia Souza =

Brazilian American journalist, ballerina, and filmmaker (born 1982)

- Born: June 10, 1982 (age 43); São Paulo, Brazil
- Years active: 2000s–present
- Known for: Soloist with Stuttgart Ballet and Les Ballets de Monte Carlo

Ana Lúcia Souza (born 10 June 1982, in São Paulo, Brazil) is a Brazilian naturalized American ballet dancer, filmmaker, and journalist. Souza was a soloist at the extinct Das Meininger Ballett, the Stuttgart Ballet, and Les Ballets de Monte Carlo in the Principality of Monaco. In New York, Souza worked as an on-camera correspondent for Brazilian Rede TV network and E! Entertainment Latin America, produced and directed Manhattan Connection's segment with host Pedro Andrade and other independent and commercial productions. Previous work also include the Lee Strasberg Theater and Film Institute, episodic TV (The First, on Hulu), and on commercial and independent film. In 2018, Ana launched a stationery line named Ana.Logica.
