= Sabotage (2014 film) =

2014 American action thriller film by David Ayer

- Theatrical release poster
- Directed by: David Ayer
- Written by: Skip Woods; David Ayer
- Produced by: Bill Block; David Ayer; Ethan Smith; Paul Hanson; Palek Patel
- Starring: Arnold Schwarzenegger; Sam Worthington; Olivia Williams; Terrence Howard; Joe Manganiello; Harold Perrineau; Martin Donovan; Max Martini; Josh Holloway; Mireille Enos
- Cinematography: Bruce McCleery
- Edited by: Dody Dorn
- Music by: David Sardy
- Production companies: Albert S. Ruddy Productions; Crave Films; QED International; Roth Films
- Distributed by: Open Road Films
- Release dates: March 19, 2014 (Los Angeles); March 28, 2014 (United States)
- Running time: 109 minutes
- Country: United States
- Language: English
- Budget: $35 million
- Box office: $22.1 million

Sabotage is a 2014 American action thriller film directed by David Ayer and written by Ayer and Skip Woods. The film stars Arnold Schwarzenegger, Sam Worthington, Olivia Williams, Terrence Howard, Joe Manganiello, Josh Holloway, and Mireille Enos. Schwarzenegger portrays the leader of a DEA team whose members (Worthington, Howard, Manganiello, Holloway, and Enos) find themselves being hunted down after they steal money seized during a cartel raid.

The film was released in the United States on March 28, 2014. Sabotage received generally mixed-to-negative reviews from critics, who praised Schwarzenegger's performance but criticized the screenplay, story, and excessive violence. It was also a box-office bomb, grossing only $22.1 million on a $35 million budget.

== Plot ==
John "Breacher" Wharton is the leader of the DEA's Special Operations Team (DEA SOT), which consists of James "Monster" Murray, Monster's wife Lizzy Murray, Joe "Grinder" Philips, Julius "Sugar" Edmonds, Eddie "Neck" Jordan, Tom "Pyro" Roberts, Bryce "Tripod" McNeely and "Smoke" Jennings.

During a raid on a cartel stronghold, Smoke is killed as the team steals $10 million from a cash stockpile, hiding it in the sewer beneath the building while blowing up the rest thereby depriving the cartel of the remaining $190 million. The stolen money disappears, and their superior Floyd Demel suspends them while the DEA investigates the team for the discrepancy between the amount reported by the team versus the higher amount anticipated because “the FBI was carrying on a parallel investigation” of the cartel. After six months without any confessions or evidence of their participation, the team is reinstated.

After waking from a drunken stupor, Pyro finds his motorhome has been towed onto a railroad crossing, which is rammed by a train, killing him before he can escape. Atlanta Police homicide detective Caroline Brentwood and her partner Darius Jackson are assigned to the case and interrogate Pyro's teammates.

Brentwood notes Neck is deliberately avoiding interrogation, and Breacher accompanies her to Neck's house, hopeful he will cooperate. When they arrive, they find him nailed to the ceiling and disemboweled. Brentwood recognizes the execution as the modus operandi of the cartels, leading Breacher to assume the cartel is hunting the team over the stolen money.

Breacher and Brentwood visit Tripod, who left the DEA after being suspended, and find him dead after a shootout in which he killed an assailant, the latter being identified by Breacher as a cartel enforcer. Monster later visits Brentwood, who is suspicious of Breacher. Monster tells her that Breacher's family was kidnapped by the cartels, who videotaped their murders and later sent the tape to Breacher along with the severed body parts of his wife and son. Breacher spent months searching for his family's killers before the team convinced him to move on. Brentwood apologizes to Breacher, and they have sex.

Jackson traces the dead enforcer's cellphone to a cartel safe house, which is raided by Breacher and his team, but the enforcers are not there. They are later found dead at the bottom of a river near Tripod's house, and Detective Brentwood realizes that they were killed before Pyro and Neck, meaning someone is framing the cartel for killing their team members.

Breacher reunites the team to tell them what happened, and Lizzy lashes out and reveals she's been having an affair with Sugar. Grinder confides in Brentwood that they stole the money. Breacher and Brentwood meet with Grinder in a local restaurant and Lizzy kills Grinder using a sniper rifle, Lizzy and Sugar being responsible for the murders of their teammates. As Lizzy is putting together her gear to leave the country with Sugar, Monster destroys her passport, and Lizzy attacks him with a knife, killing him.

Breacher and Brentwood go to Lizzy's house and find Monster's body stuffed in a refrigerator. Lizzy calls Breacher, pretending to be alone, and arranges a meeting at a parking garage. Breacher goes there with Detective Brentwood, who ducks down in the car, unseen. Lizzy and Sugar ambush Breacher, and Brentwood assists Breacher. Lizzy and Sugar drive away, pursued by Breacher and Brentwood. After a lengthy chase, Sugar and Lizzy's car crashes into a tow truck, the ramp decapitating Sugar.

Breacher and Brentwood confront Lizzy, who accuses the team of stealing the money behind her back, motivating her to seek revenge. Brentwood is puzzled, assuming Lizzy had stolen the money. Breacher tells Lizzy that he took the money. Lizzy tries to reach for her weapon and Breacher shoots her dead. As the local police arrive Breacher disappears, leaving Brentwood frustrated.

Weeks later, Breacher is in Mexico, where he uses the stolen money for its intended purpose – to bribe a corrupt police official into helping him identify Brujo, the man who murdered his family. Breacher finds him in a Mexican bar and kills him and others loyal to him.

Wounded, Breacher sits at a table, takes a shot of whiskey and lights up one last cigar, smiling as he awaits his fate.

== Cast ==
- Arnold Schwarzenegger as DEA Supervisory Special Agent John "Breacher" Wharton
- Sam Worthington as DEA Special Agent James "Monster" Murray
- Olivia Williams as Atlanta Police Investigator Caroline Brentwood
- Mireille Enos as DEA Special Agent Lizzy Murray
- Terrence Howard as DEA Special Agent Julius "Sugar" Edmonds
- Joe Manganiello as DEA Special Agent Joe "Grinder" Phillips
- Harold Perrineau as Atlanta Police Investigator Darius Jackson
- Martin Donovan as Assistant Special Agent-in-Charge Floyd Demel
- Max Martini as DEA Special Agent Tom "Pyro" Roberts
- Josh Holloway as DEA Special Agent Eddie "Neck" Jordan
- Kevin Vance as DEA Special Agent Bryce "Tripod" McNeely
- Troy Garity as DEA Special Agent Spolcheck

== Production ==
=== Filming ===
Filming started on October 15, 2012 and was completed by December 13, 2012.

== Release ==
=== Marketing ===
An unrated red band trailer for the film was released on February 7, 2014. The film was previously titled Ten and Breacher.

To promote the film, Schwarzenegger and Joe Manganiello made a guest appearance on the March 24, 2014 episode of WWE Raw, where they joined Hulk Hogan in the ring before confronting The Miz.

While the initially released poster for the film gave a release date of April 11, it was released on March 28, 2014.

== Reception ==
=== Box office ===
The film, budgeted at $35 million, grossed $5.3 million in its opening weekend, finishing in seventh place. The opening was the worst for a Schwarzenegger film in over thirty years. The worldwide gross as of July 6, 2014 is $17.5 million, with $10.5 million of the total gross coming from America. The total worldwide gross was $22.1 million.

=== Critical response ===
On Rotten Tomatoes, the film has an approval rating of 21% based on 111 reviews, with an average rating of 4.31/10. The site's critics consensus reads, "Sabotage boasts one of Arnold Schwarzenegger's finer post-political performances, but it's wasted in a movie driven by grueling violence that punishes seemingly without purpose." On Metacritic, the film has a weighted average score of 41 out of 100, based on 31 critics, indicating "mixed or average reviews". Audiences surveyed by CinemaScore gave the film a grade "B" on scale of A to F.

Richard Roeper of the Chicago Sun-Times gave the film a positive review and wrote: "This brutal, bloody, dark and at times gruesomely funny thriller isn't some David Fincher-esque mood piece where all the clues come together at the end. It's more like a modern-day, Georgia version of a spaghetti Western."

Jim Vejvoda of IGN gave the film a seven out of ten rating, with the verdict: "Sabotage is far more effective than its action-centric trailers have suggested, with the film more a mystery-thriller that actually offers Arnold Schwarzenegger and the cool ensemble a chance to act and not just shoot guns."

When asked by IndieWire "What happened?" and about the experience of making the film, director David Ayer said, "Oh gosh. I don't know. I think it's better to do my movies starting from scratch, with my own scripts. I learned a lot and everything learned there I brought to the table in theory." He reiterated this statement in an Esquire interview: "Sabotage was an opportunity. That was journeyman work, but the irony is I learned more off that movie on what filmmaking is and isn't than everything else combined. A lot of lessons and it will impact me for the rest of my career."

== See also ==
- List of American films of 2014
- Arnold Schwarzenegger filmography
