= Hitman: Agent 47 =

2015 American action thriller film

- Theatrical release poster
- Directed by: Aleksander Bach
- Screenplay by: Skip Woods; Michael Finch
- Story by: Skip Woods
- Based on: Hitman by IO Interactive
- Produced by: Adrian Askarieh; Charles Gordon; Skip Woods; Alex Young
- Starring: Rupert Friend; Hannah Ware; Zachary Quinto; Ciarán Hinds; Thomas Kretschmann; Angelababy
- Cinematography: Óttar Guðnason
- Edited by: Nicolas de Toth
- Music by: Marco Beltrami
- Production companies: Daybreak Films; Giant Pictures
- Distributed by: 20th Century Fox
- Release dates: August 13, 2015 (New York City); August 21, 2015 (United States)
- Running time: 96 minutes
- Countries: United States; Germany; Singapore; United Kingdom
- Language: English
- Budget: $35 million
- Box office: $82.3 million

Hitman: Agent 47 is a 2015 action thriller film based on the Hitman video game series, developed by IO Interactive, and its main character, a mysterious assassin known only as Agent 47. It is a reboot of the 2007 film Hitman, and was directed by Aleksander Bach (in his directorial debut) and written by Skip Woods (who also wrote the 2007 film) and Michael Finch. The film stars Rupert Friend, Hannah Ware, Zachary Quinto, Ciarán Hinds, Thomas Kretschmann, and Angelababy.

Hitman: Agent 47 premiered in New York City on August 13, 2015, and was theatrically released in the United States on August 21. It was panned by critics, even further than the original film, who took issue with the screenplay, visual effects, and lacking faithfulness to the source material, although the action scenes, score and some performances were praised. Nevertheless, the film grossed $82.3 million worldwide against its $35 million budget.

== Plot ==
47 is an "Agent", a genetically-enhanced super soldier created by Dr. Piotr Litvenko, a skilled Ukrainian geneticist. Litvenko, unable to bear the guilt of his creation, abandoned the Agent project. 47 works as a hitman for the ICA (International Contracts Agency) and has spent the last few years tracking down Litvenko's daughter, Katia; he gets a lead from mercenaries led by Delriego, who have been trying to find Litvenko in order to recreate the Agent program for their own means.

Katia, living in Berlin under the assumed surname of Van Dees, has worked tirelessly to find an unknown man and is plagued by overwhelming anxiety and a superhuman awareness of everything around her. Katia is approached at a subway station by a man calling himself John Smith. He tells her that 47 is on his way to kill her, and offers her protection, while hinting that he has information about the man she's seeking. 47 finds and attacks the pair, who are able to escape, but not before 47 grazes Katia's arm with a sniper bullet.

Smith and Katia hide out in a hotel room. He explains that he is an operative for a corporation known as Syndicate International and that the man she's seeking is her father. Katia shows him the clues she has put together and asks Smith to tell her everything he knows about her father. Based on the languages he knows, his age, his love of orchids and medical condition (lung cancer), Katia deduces where her father must be living. Before she can tell Smith, 47 enters, leaving Smith for dead and capturing Katia.

Once Katia awakens, 47 explains to her that she is an Agent, designed by her father to be better than even 47. He explains that her name "Katia van Dees" is a homophone for her real name, "Quatre-vingt-dix"; which is French for "90". He shows her how to use her heightened senses in combat and the two fight against Syndicate forces. They are confronted by Smith, who is revealed to have surgically implanted subdermal titanium body armor, making him impervious to gunshots. After fighting off Smith, 47 and Katia manage to escape. Katia makes 47 promise that he won't harm her father and finally reveals Litvenko's location — Singapore. Elsewhere, 47's handler Diana, learning of his situation, contacts another Agent with a contract in Singapore.

47 and Katia track down Litvenko, who apologizes to Katia for abandoning her, saying that he only wanted to keep her safe and referring to 47 as her "brother". Just then, Syndicate soldiers attack the group and they are forced to flee. During the escape, Litvenko is captured by the Syndicate, but not before 47 slips him an explosive-rigged inhaler.

Smith tortures Litvenko under the supervision of Syndicate director Antoine Le Clerq, but Litvenko refuses to reopen the Agent program. 47 hacks into the Syndicate announcing system and Katia crashes a stolen helicopter into the building; 47 disguises himself as a firefighter to get inside undetected. The two fight their way through Syndicate security forces, and 47 is once again confronted by Smith. 47 defeats him by electrocuting him.

On the rooftop, 47 and Katia mop up the rest of the Syndicate's troops, but not before Le Clerq escapes in a helicopter with Litvenko. In mid-air, Litvenko detonates the inhaler, killing himself and the director. 47 then calls Diana and confirms his first target (Le Clerq) has been eliminated. When Diana asks about the second target (implied to be Katia), 47 drops his phone off the side of the building. As the two prepare to leave, they are confronted by Agent 48, an exact look-alike of Agent 47, who tells them "Diana says 'Hello'" before he, Agent 47, and Katia fire.

In the mid-credits scene, Smith is shown to be still alive.

== Cast ==
- Rupert Friend as Agent 47, a mysterious assassin who works for a top secret non-government organization called the International Contracts Agency (known as either the ICA or just the Agency) which carries out the assassinations of high-profile targets worldwide. Friend also portrays Agent 48.
  - Jesse Hergt as Young Agent 47
- Hannah Ware as Katia van Dees, a woman with enhanced senses, who is on the run, and is desperately searching for Litvenko
  - Helena Pieske as Young Katia
- Zachary Quinto as John Smith, a high-ranking member of Syndicate International surgically enhanced to counter Agents like 47
- Ciarán Hinds as Piotr Litvenko, doctor and the founder of the Agent program and Katia's father
  - Johannes Suhm as Young Piotr Litvenko
- Thomas Kretschmann as Antoine Le Clerq, the chairman of an organization called Syndicate International, which is described as an international terrorist organization responsible for creating an army of unstoppable assassins in an effort to destroy the ICA.
- Angelababy as Diana Burnwood, the handler of Agent 47
- Dan Bakkedahl as Sanders, an American diplomatic official in Berlin who interrogates Agent 47
- Jürgen Prochnow as Tobias
- Rolf Kanies as Dr. Albert Delriego
- Jerry Hoffmann as Franco

== Production ==
On February 5, 2013, it was reported that 20th Century Fox was developing a new film based on the Hitman video games, with the title Agent 47 derived from the lead character Agent 47. Skip Woods wrote the screenplay with Michael Finch, and commercial director Aleksander Bach directed as his feature film debut.

=== Casting ===
On February 5, 2013, Paul Walker was attached to play the title role as Agent 47, but on November 30, 2013, he died in a car accident, before filming had begun. On January 9, 2014, Rupert Friend was in talks to replace Walker. On January 31, 2014, Zachary Quinto joined the film in a supporting role. On February 5, 2014, Hannah Ware also joined the film to play the female lead. On March 6, 2014, Thomas Kretschmann signed on to play the high-profile villain Le Clerq. On March 13, 2014, Dan Bakkedahl joined the cast of the film. On March 14, 2014, Ciarán Hinds signed on to star in the film as a scientist.

=== Filming ===
Filming was originally set to take place in Berlin, Potsdam and Singapore in summer 2013, but was later postponed to March 2014. Principal photography began on February 18, 2014; an image from the European set was released that week.

=== Soundtrack ===
The official soundtrack was composed by Marco Beltrami.

== Reception ==
=== Box office ===
Hitman: Agent 47 grossed $22.5 million in North America and $59.9 million in other territories for a worldwide total of $82.3 million, against a budget of $35 million.

In its opening weekend, the film grossed $8.3 million, finishing fourth at the box office.

The film opened in 60 markets internationally. It opened in France at number 2 with $1.9 million, third in the United Kingdom with $1.4 million, and first in Colombia.

=== Critical response ===
Review aggregation website Rotten Tomatoes gives the film an approval rating of 8% based on 130 reviews, with an average rating of 3.8/10. The site's critical consensus reads, "Hitman: Agent 47 fails to clear the low bar set by its predecessor, forsaking thrilling action in favor of a sleekly hollow mélange of dull violence and product placement." Metacritic gives the film a score of 28 out of 100, based on reviews from 27 critics, indicating "generally unfavorable" reviews. Audiences surveyed by CinemaScore gave the film an average grade of "B" on an A+ to F scale.

IGN gave the film a score of 6.0/10, saying, "Hitman: Agent 47 is almost certainly going to be too much of a generic action film for those heavily invested in the game franchise, and too video game-like for those who aren't." IrishFilmCritic gave the film 3.5/5 stars, describing the target audience as "those of us who grew up in the 70's and 80's and thrived on overly exaggerated action films with anything that starred Arnold Schwarzenegger, Sylvester Stallone and Bruce Willis... Go to this movie and just have fun, it's that simple." Kotaku also gave the film a positive review.

Tech-savvy site Geek.com awarded the film a decent review. Critic Will Greenwald commented that "It isn't a must-watch, and doesn't stand out as memorable or terrible, but it's enjoyable enough to at least feel like Hitman... The premise feels like The Professional... And, as stupid as that all sounds, it's actually very loosely the plot of the first Hitman game, Hitman: Codename 47... the first hour the film feels like a bizarre take on The Terminator. The action is frantic and creative. Gunplay feels a bit like Equilibrium, which means it's eye-catching, brutal, and incredibly unrealistic... and it's entertaining despite not feeling as genuine and harsh as the action in Dredd or John Wick... I liked Hitman: Agent 47, but it's not a very good movie. It's uneven and weird, and while it's much more enjoyable than the previous Hitman film, it doesn't leave a very lasting impression. It's not Hitman boring and it's not Street Fighter: The Legend of Chun-Li bad or faithless to the source material, but it isn't consistently as strong as it could have been with a bit more logic in the writing and much less reliance on CG and film speed trickery to make the fights seem flashier (and faker). There are just too many little things that feel off for the big, eye-catching things to really stay with you."

The Sci-Fi Movie Page awarded the film two stars out of five. Film critic Tim Janson stated: "First time Director Aleksander Bach makes the mistake in thinking that more characters with special abilities makes for a better film. Unfortunately this is not the case. There's little attempt at developing any of the characters as more than one-dimensional cutouts."

=== Home media ===
20th Century Fox Home Entertainment released Hitman: Agent 47 on DVD and Blu-ray on December 29, 2015.

== Future ==
In 2015, Adrian Askarieh told IGN in an interview that he may oversee a film universe with Just Cause, Hitman, Tomb Raider, Deus Ex and Thief.

A sequel to Hitman: Agent 47 was planned, but was scrapped in 2019 after Disney's acquisition of 21st Century Fox.

== See also ==
- List of films based on video games
