= Knots (film) =

2004 television film

- DVD cover
- Directed by: Greg Lombardo
- Written by: Greg Lombardo; Neil Turitz
- Produced by: Dan Abrams; Oritte Bendory; Scott Cohen; Aaron N. Feldman; Yurgi Ganter; J. Todd Harris; Greg Lombardo; Craig Davis Roth; Neil Turitz
- Cinematography: Michael Fimognari
- Edited by: Joe Landauer
- Music by: Joseph Saba
- Production company: Davis Entertainment Filmworks
- Release date: 2004
- Running time: 93 minutes
- Country: United States
- Language: English

Knots is a comedy film written by Greg Lombardo and Neil Turitz. Directed by Lombardo, the film was screened at the Gen Art Film Festival in 2004 and premiered on cable television in 2005. John Stamos, Michael Leydon Campbell and Tara Reid star.

== Plot ==
The film tells the story of a man (Scott Cohen) who discovers his wife (Annabeth Gish) is having an affair, and the consequences of their resulting relationship with the mistress (Paulina Porizkova).
