= Thursday (film) =

- Theatrical release poster
- Directed by: Skip Woods
- Written by: Skip Woods
- Produced by: Alan Poul; Christine Sheaks; Skip Woods
- Starring: Thomas Jane; Aaron Eckhart; Paulina Porizkova; James LeGros; Paula Marshall; Michael Jeter; Glenn Plummer; Mickey Rourke
- Cinematography: Denis Lenoir
- Edited by: Peter Schink; Paul Trejo
- Music by: Luna
- Production companies: PolyGram Filmed Entertainment; Propaganda Films
- Distributed by: Legacy Releasing
- Release dates: September 10, 1998 (Oldenburg International Film Festival); November 13, 1998 (United States)
- Running time: 87 minutes
- Country: United States
- Language: English
- Box office: $3,121

Thursday is a 1998 American black comedy crime-thriller film written and directed by Skip Woods and starring Thomas Jane, Aaron Eckhart, Paulina Porizkova, Paula Marshall, Michael Jeter and Mickey Rourke. It won the Special Jury Prize at the Cognac Festival.

== Plot ==
On Monday night, Nick, Dallas, and Billy Hill argue with a Los Angeles convenience store cashier, resulting in Dallas shooting her dead. They conceal the killing from a police officer until he sees blood on the floor, at which point they kill him.

Early Thursday morning, in Texas, Casey receives a call from his old drug dealing partner Nick asking to stay a couple of days. Since they parted ways several years previously, Casey has cleaned up, married, and is hoping to adopt a child. Nick borrows Casey's car, and Casey finds Nick's suitcase to be full of heroin. Furious, he calls Nick and gives an ultimatum in which Nick either leaves or Casey calls the cops. Nick promises he'll be along once he has finished some business. Casey puts the heroin down his garbage disposal unit.

At 11:55, Casey answers the door to hitman Ice. Casey asks that they smoke some ganja together before he dies, then takes advantage of a distraction. Ice ends up gagged and bound in Casey's garage just as Dr. Jarvis, the adoption agent, rings the doorbell. Casey, stoned, rushes to clear away the drug paraphernalia before letting Jarvis in to discuss his suitability to adopt. Jarvis expresses curiosity about what Casey did when he lived in Los Angeles, as there is no account of his time there. Casey tries his best to cover up his past as well as his recent encounter with Ice.

During the interview, Dallas shows up at Casey's house, believing that Nick has left some money with Casey along with the heroin. She scares Jarvis away by telling a story about Casey's criminal past. When left alone with Casey, Dallas questions him about the money. Angry that he cannot help her, she decides to kill him, but not before she ties him to a chair, fellates him to force an erection, then proceeds to rape him by forcing him to sexually penetrate her. Dallas says she will not kill Casey until he orgasms and plans to continue until he does so. She orgasms twice, but gets no results from Casey. While Dallas reaches a third orgasm, Billy breaks in and shoots her dead because he believes that she was wasting time.

Billy believes Casey when told that he has not taken the heroin, but plans on torturing him anyway with a saw and a blowtorch. Billy is interrupted by cops raiding the house next door. As Billy is distracted, Casey is able to loosen the tape around his wrists and grabs a frying pan before he sits back down. When Billy returns, Casey catches him off guard, overpowers him with the frying pan, and leaves him in the garage.

Nick calls Casey from a payphone, apologizes for everything, and admits he had stolen the heroin and money from the police. After he hangs up, it is revealed that Nick has been shot and is dying from blood loss. Finally, corrupt cop Kasarov arrives with a bag which contains Nick's head. He gives Casey until 7 p.m. to find the money, but says that he does not care about the heroin. Upon seeing Dallas's body and Ice and Billy in the garage, Kasarov unloads his gun into the latter two. He tells Casey to throw them out, as it is garbage day.

Casey calls Ice's boss and tells him that the heroin is being auctioned off at 7 p.m. at his house, setting up a gun battle between a Jamaican gang and Kasarov's corrupt cops. Casey recalls Nick's earlier words, which lead him to find the money and a wedding present in the spare tire of his car. He takes them, puts them in Dallas's Lamborghini, and leaves to pick his wife up at the airport.

== Cast ==
- Thomas Jane as Casey Wells
- Aaron Eckhart as Nick
- Paulina Porizkova as Dallas
- James LeGros as Billy Hill
- Paula Marshall as Christine
- Michael Jeter as Dr. Jarvis
- Glenn Plummer as "Ice"
- Mickey Rourke as Detective Kasarov
- Shawn Michael Howard as Jimmy
- Gary Dourdan as Lester "Ball-Peen" James
- Luck Hari as The Cashier
- Bari K. Willerford as Cop
- Brian Hooks as Jary

== Critical response ==
On the review aggregator website Rotten Tomatoes, the film has an approval rating of 43%, based on 7 critic reviews, with an average rating of 5.1/10.

Film critic Emanuel Levy rated the film 2 out of 5 stars, while Christopher Null granted it a 3 out of 5 star rating.

In his review of Thursday, Roger Ebert of the Chicago Sun-Times vehemently condemned the film's offensive nature, declaring it crossed a line that left him outraged. He characterized the movie as a disturbing sequence of events involving torture, rape, murder, and dismemberment, all interwoven with derogatory sexist and racist language. Ebert's critique delved into the film's tone, expressing skepticism about its reliance on irony and laughter to shield the audience from a moral response. He questioned the film's choice to portray characters as murderers and torturers without justifiable motives, highlighting the gratuitous violence directed towards black, Asian, and Indian characters. He also drew a pointed comparison between the film and Quentin Tarantino's work, highlighting the distinction between Tarantino's artful treatment of risky subject matter and the exploitative nature of Thursday, which he contended turned depravity into a standup routine. Ebert criticized the audience's lack of moral awareness during the Q&A session after the screening, where he confronted the director about the film's depiction of race and violence.

Brendan Kelly of Variety criticized the film as a subpar Tarantino imitation, stating that it offers only a few funny moments and fails to save itself from being labeled as a derivative retread. Kelly attributed this to director Woods' unapologetic borrowing from Reservoir Dogs (1992) and Pulp Fiction (1994). He suggested that the film's reliance on familiar hip and violent themes might find a more receptive audience in the video market than in theaters, given the current saturation of such content. Kelly praised Thomas Jane and Aaron Eckhart's performances, but characterized Paulina Porizkova's casting as a ruthless mob figure as a misstep.

== Awards and nominations ==
At the Cognac Festival du Film Policier the film won the 1999 Special Jury Prize (tied with A Simple Plan).

It was nominated for an Artios Award in the category of Best Casting of an Independent Feature Film.
