= Aleksander Bach =

German film director

- Born: 1980 (age 45–46); Lublin, Poland
- Occupations: Film director, commercial director, music video director
- Years active: 2015–present
- Notable work: Hitman: Agent 47

Aleksander Bach is a German film director, known for directing the 2015 action thriller Hitman: Agent 47.

== Early life ==
Bach was born in Lublin, Poland, but later moved to Solingen, Germany with his parents in his childhood, where he grew up. He graduated in Audio Visual Engineering from the Robert Schumann Hochschule, and then completed his post-graduate degree from the Film Academy Baden-Württemberg.

== Career ==
Bach started his career as a music video director and then ventured into making advertisements for several major clients.

In 2015, Bach made his feature directorial debut with the action film Hitman: Agent 47, based on the video game series Hitman. Rupert Friend portrayed the lead role of a secret agent named Agent 47, along with Hannah Ware as the female lead. The film was released on August 21, 2015 by 20th Century Fox. The film was rated 8% on Rotten Tomatoes by professional critics, with the consensus being: "Hitman: Agent 47 fails to clear the low bar set by its predecessor, forsaking thrilling action in favor of a sleekly hollow mélange of dull violence and product placement."

== Filmography ==
Year	Title	director	(Executive) Producer	screenWriter	Actor	Role	Film studio	Budget	Box office	Rotten Tomatoes	Metacritic									
Year	Title	director	(Executive) Producer	screenWriter	Actor	Role	Film studio	Budget	Box office	2015	Hitman: Agent 47	Yes	No	No	No	Daybreak Films; Giant Pictures	$35 million	$82,3 million	8% (130 reviews)	28/100 (27 reviews)
TBA	Revoc	Yes	No	No	No		Mandeville Films													
