= Hannah Ware =

English actress

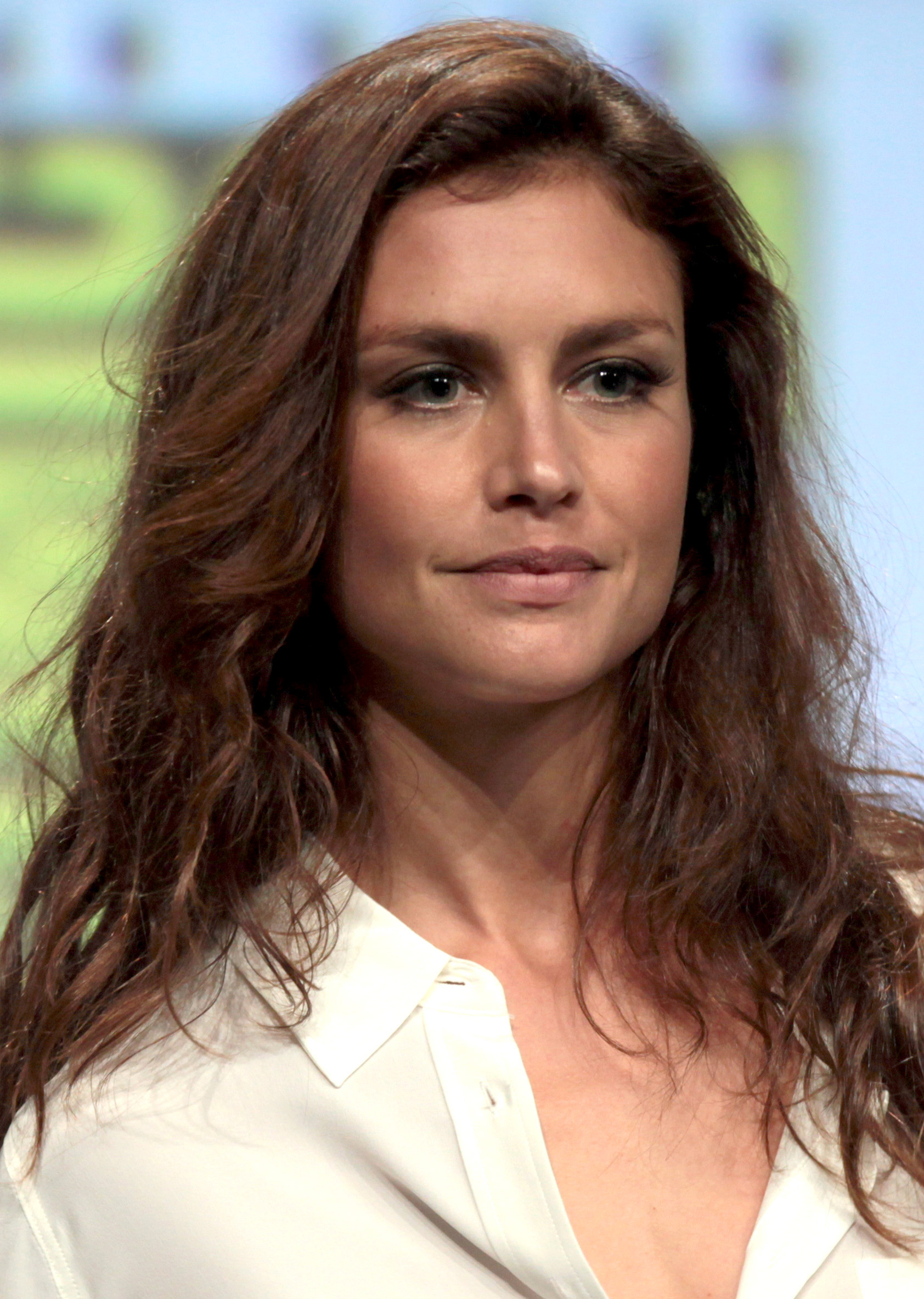
- Ware in 2014
- Born: Hannah Rose Ware; 8 December 1982 (age 43); London, England
- Occupation: Actress
- Years active: 2010–present
- Father: John Ware
- Relatives: Jessie Ware (sister)

Hannah Rose Ware (born 8 December 1982) is an English actress. She is known for the Starz political drama series Boss (2011–2012) and the ABC primetime soap opera Betrayal (2013–2014).

== Life and career ==
Ware was born in Hammersmith and raised in Clapham. She is the daughter of Helena (née Keell), a social worker, and John Ware, a former BBC Panorama reporter, who divorced when she was 12. She is the older sister of musician Jessie Ware. Her mother is Jewish, and both Ware and her sister were raised in the faith. She attended Alleyn's School in Dulwich, then studied acting at the Lee Strasberg Theatre and Film Institute in New York.

Ware appeared in the films Cop Out (2010) and Shame (2011). From 2011 to 2012, she played Emma Kane, the estranged addict daughter of Chicago mayor Tom Kane, in the Starz series Boss. In 2013, she was cast in ABC drama series Betrayal as lead character, and she appeared in Spike Lee's thriller film Oldboy. In 2015, Ware played the female lead, opposite Rupert Friend, in the action film Hitman: Agent 47.

Ware starred in the Hulu series The First in 2018, and played the leading role on the Netflix science fiction series The One in 2021.

== Filmography ==
=== Film ===
Year	Title	Role	Notes
2010	Cop Out	Mrs. Armisen	
2011	Shame	Samantha	
2013	Oldboy	Donna Hawthorne	
2015	Hitman: Agent 47	Katia	
2017	Aftermath	Tessa	
2018	The Angel	Diana Ellis	

=== Television ===
Year	Title	Role	Notes
2011–2012	Boss	Emma Kane	Main role
2013–2014	Betrayal	Sara Hanley	Main role
2018	The First	Sadie Hewitt	Main role
2021	The One	Rebecca Webb	Main role
