= Larry Edwards (entertainer) =

Female impersonator known as Hot Chocolate

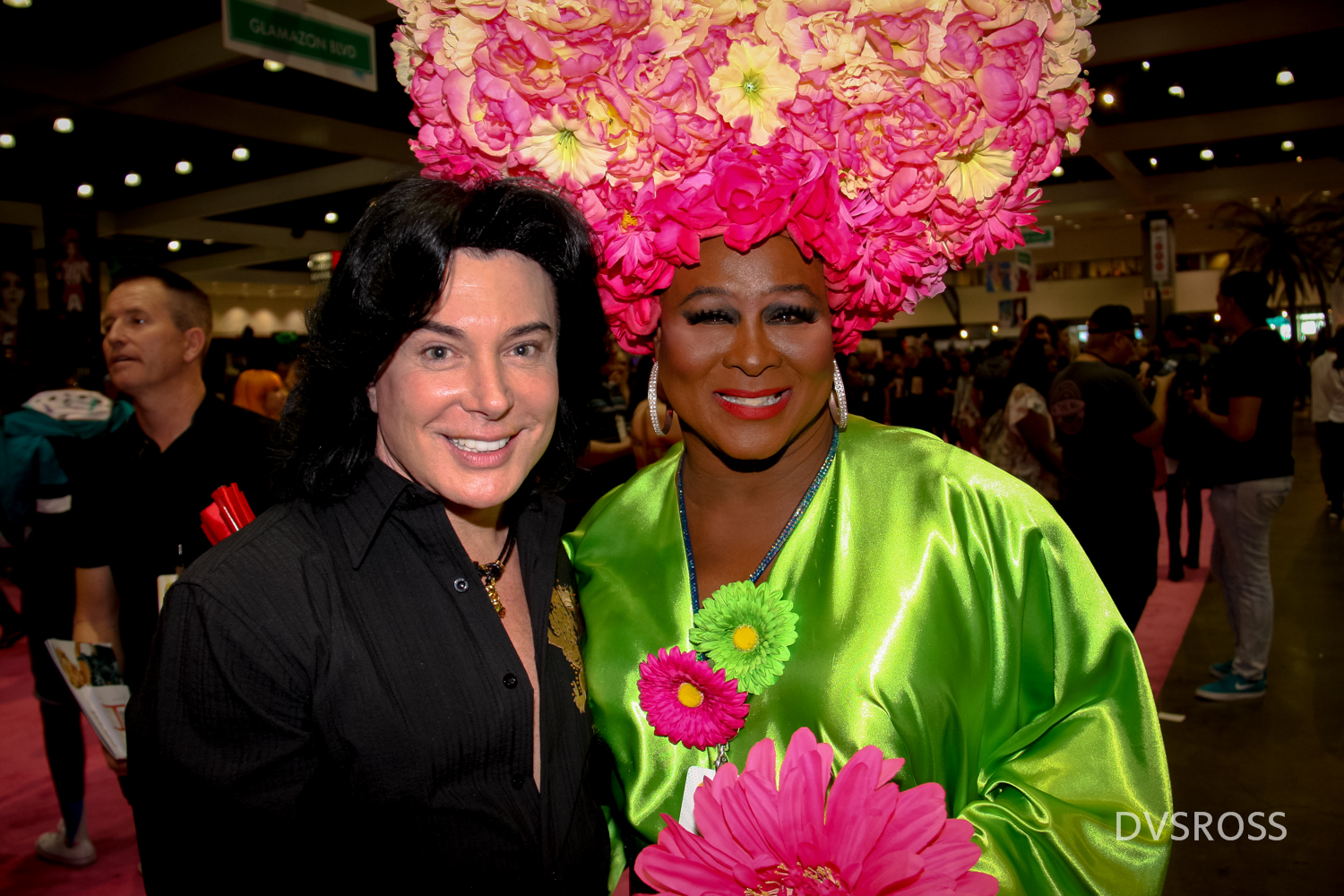
- Edwards (right) with Frank Marino, 2018
- Born: Larry Edwards; Fort Myers, Florida, U.S.
- Other names: Hot Chocolate
- Occupation: female impersonator
- Website: http://www.larryedwardslive.com/

Larry Edwards, also known by his drag persona Hot Chocolate, is an American entertainer. Known for his performances in Las Vegas, primarily as a Tina Turner impersonator and drag queen. Edwards has also competed in national pageants, being crowned as Miss Gay America in 1980.

Edwards has made numerous appearances on film and in television, including Miss Congeniality 2, What's Love Got to Do with It, the documentary Pageant, and the competition series The Next Best Thing.

Edwards studied Fashion Merchandising at Massey Business College in Atlanta, Georgia.

Edwards performed in Frank Marino's Las Vegas drag-revue show Divas as Tina Turner and previously performed in the long-running hit show La Cage at the Riviera Hotel and Casino. Edwards met Tina Turner at a taping of The Oprah Winfrey Show.

Edwards was the Celebrity Grand Marshall of the Las Vegas Pride Parade in 2010. Las Vegas mayor Oscar Goodman awarded Edwards the Keys to the city for his work in promoting the hospitality industry of the area.

In 2019, when Celine Dion announced her 2019/2020 Courage World Tour, she released a video titled "Ciao for now Las Vegas", in which she leaves Las Vegas in a car full of drag queens. Impersonator Steven Wayne stood in for Dion, alongside drag queens; Bryan Watkins, Crystal Woods and Hot Chocolate as Barbra Streisand, Diana Ross and Tina Turner.

He released a music video in 2020 featuring the remixed version of "What's Love Got to Do with It" by Kygo.

== Filmography ==
Film / Television
Year	Title	Role	Notes
1985	The Female Impersonator of the Year Pageant	Self / Contestant	(TV special)
1993	What's Love Got to Do with It	Tina Turner Impersonator (uncredited)	(Film)
1995	Rolling Stones: Voodoo Lounge	Female impersonator	(Video Game)
2005	Miss Congeniality 2: Armed and Fabulous	Patti LaBelle Impersonator / Tina Turner Impersonator #2	(Film)
2007	The Next Best Thing: Who Is the Greatest Celebrity Impersonator?	Tina Turner	(TV Series), 1 episode: "Las Vegas Auditions"
2008	Get Happy	Self	(Short film)
2008	Pageant	Self as Pageant Judge / Miss Gay America 1980	(Documentary Film)
2010	360° Around the World	Self	(Documentary film)
2013	Celebrity Page	Self / Tina Turner	(TV Series), 2 episodes: "22 September 2013" and "4 December 2013"
2013	Toddlers & Tiaras	Celebrity Judge / Tina Turner	(TV Series), 1 episode: "Las Vegas: LalapaZOOza"
2014	Long Island Medium	Tina Turner	(TV Series documentary), 1 episode: "On The Road: Las Vegas Part II"
2014	Travelator	Tina Turner	(Film)
2015	You Have to Believe	Tina Turner	(Video short)
2016	Sharknado 4: The 4th Awakens	Background extra	(Film)
2017	Caraoke Showdown	Proud Mary / Tina	(TV Series), 1 episode: "Proud Mary, Tina, Britney and Cher"
2018	Last Laugh in Vegas	Pamela Manderson and Tina Turner	(TV Series documentary), 2 episodes: "Episode #1.3" and "Episode #1.4"
2019	The Talk	Himself	(TV Series), 1 episode: "Episode #10.39"
