= Dawn Langley Simmons =

English author and biographer

- Born: Gordon Langley Hall; 16 October 1922; Kent, England
- Died: 18 September 2000 (aged 77); Charleston, South Carolina, U.S.
- Occupations: Biographer; Essayist
- Spouse: John-Paul Simmons
- Children: Natasha Simmons
- Writing career
- Language: English

Dawn Langley Pepita Simmons (16 October 1922 – 18 September 2000) was an English author and biographer. Born as Gordon Langley Hall, Simmons lived her first decades as a boy. As a young adult, she became close to British actress Dame Margaret Rutherford, who she considered an adoptive mother, and who was the subject of a biography written by Simmons in her later years.

== Early life ==
Simmons' parents were servants at Sissinghurst Castle, the English estate of biographer Harold Nicolson and his novelist wife, Vita Sackville-West. Simmons was born in Sussex as Gordon Langley Hall to Jack Copper, Vita Sackville-West's chauffeur, and another servant, Marjorie Hall Ticehurst, before they were married. Although she claimed to have been born with an unusual condition causing the swelling of her genitals with the result that she was mistakenly identified as a boy, Charleston author Edward Ball's book Peninsula of Lies (2004) states that she was born male.

As a child, Simmons was raised by her grandmother and at one point visited the castle and met Virginia Woolf, Sackville-West's lover. Woolf made Sackville-West the subject of the novel Orlando: A Biography, which bears a striking resemblance to Simmons' own life story.

== Early career ==
In 1946 Simmons emigrated to Canada. Still living as a man, she crewcut her hair and became a teacher on the Ojibway native reserve on Lake Nipigon, experiences from which were translated into the best-selling Me Papoose Sitter (1955)—the first of many published books.

After a stint as an editor for the Winnipeg Free Press, Simmons moved back to England in 1947, to teach theatre at the Gregg School in Croydon, Surrey. She moved to the United States in 1950, and became the society editor for the Nevada Daily Mail in Missouri before moving to New York and working as the society editor of the Port Chester Daily Item. Shortly after moving to New York, Simmons met artist Isabel Whitney, beginning a friendship that would last until Whitney's death in 1962.

During this time, Simmons began a prolific writing career, including a series of biographies which covered personalities such as Princess Margaret (1958), Jacqueline Kennedy (1964), Lady Bird Johnson (1967), and Mary Todd Lincoln (1970) among many more. While living in Whitney's New York townhouse in the 1950s, Simmons was introduced to Margaret Rutherford and her husband Stringer Davis. Rutherford, interested in meeting Simmons to discuss a role in a possible adaptation of Me Papoose Sitter, became enamored with the young author and she and Davis agreed to serve as unofficial adoptive parents. Subsequently, Simmons and Whitney purchased a house in Charleston, South Carolina, though Whitney died two weeks later, leaving Simmons the house and $2 million.

== Move to South Carolina ==
The mansion Simmons purchased with Whitney was located in the Ansonborough neighbourhood of Charleston, a neighbourhood known for housing the city's queer elite. Simmons began restoring the house, and designed the interior with early American antiques and furniture by Thomas Chippendale. Much later, shortly before her death, her pursuit of Chippendale pieces brought her into contact with Edward Ball, a journalist whose family had owned a Chippendale-style commode, and who would later write a biography about her.

In her autobiographical books, Simmons said she was born intersex with ambiguous genitalia, as well as an internal uterus and ovaries, and was inappropriately assigned male at birth. Simmons underwent gender affirming surgery at Johns Hopkins Hospital in 1968, carried out by Dr. Milton Edgerton. In Ball's Peninsula of Lies, he disputes Simmons' claim that she was intersex, suggesting instead that Simmons had male genitalia and was unable to bear children.

== Marriage ==
Simmons legally changed her name to Dawn Pepita Langley Hall, and became engaged to John-Paul Simmons, then a young Black motor mechanic with dreams of becoming a sculptor. Their marriage on 21 January 1969 was one of the first in South Carolina after Loving v. Virginia invalidated state laws against interracial marriage. The ceremony was carried out in their drawing room, reportedly after threats to bomb the church. After a second ceremony in England, the crate containing their wedding gifts was firebombed in Charleston, and Simmons received a ticket the next day when the charred remains were obstructing a sidewalk.

On 17 October 1971, her daughter, Natasha Margienell Manigault Paul Simmons, was born in Philadelphia, Pennsylvania. Edward Ball claims to have been told by John-Paul Simmons that Natasha was his child from another relationship, although "Natasha fervently believed Dawn was her mother".

After an intruder raped Simmons and broke her arm, the family moved to Catskill, New York.

== Later years and death ==
In 1982, Simmons divorced John-Paul Simmons, who had been abusive and had schizophrenia. After spending several years in Hudson, New York, she moved in with her daughter and three grandchildren, who had returned to Charleston. In 1985, while back in Charleston, Simmons was featured as an extra in several scenes of ABC's miniseries North and South.

In her final years, Simmons developed Parkinson's disease, and died at her daughter's home on 18 September 2000.

== In popular culture ==
In the 1987 film Withnail and I, set in 1969, the character Marwood reads a tabloid newspaper article about Gordon Langley Hall, entitled "I Had to Become a Woman".

Author Jack Hitt profiled Simmons in a 1996 episode of This American Life titled "Dawn". Hitt, a native of Charleston, had grown up down the street from Simmons. From interviews, including with Simmons, Hitt assembled stories of her transsexuality, interracial marriages in the South, her rumoured voodoo powers, and rumoured hosting of a full-fledged debut for her chihuahua. Hitt expanded the piece for publication in the October 1998 GQ.

In 2022, filmmaker Ron Davis directed the 34-minute documentary Dawn: A Charleston Legend, named after her autobiography. This included interviews with her daughter and her sister-in-law.

== Bibliography ==
- Saraband for a saint: A Modern Morality Play in two acts (1954)
- Me Papoose Sitter (1955)
- The Gypsy Condesa (1958)
- Princess Margaret (1958)
- The Enchanted Bungalow (1959)
- Golden Boats from Burma: The Life of Ann Hasseltine Judson, the first American Woman in Burma (1961)
- Peter Jumping Horse (1961)
- The Two Lives of Baby Doe (1962)
- Vinnie Ream: The Story of the Girl who Sculptured Lincoln (1963)
- Jacqueline Kennedy: A Biography (1964)
- The Sawdust Trail: The story of American Evangelism (1964)
- Dear Vagabonds: The story of Roy and Brownie Adams (1964)
- Osceola (1964)
- Mr Jefferson's Ladies (1966)
- Lady Bird and Her Daughters (1967)
- William, Father of The Netherlands (1969)
- A Rose for Mrs. Lincoln: A Biography of Mary Todd Lincoln (1970)
- Man into woman: A Transsexual Autobiography (1971)
- All for Love (1975)
- Rosalynn Carter: Her Life Story (1979)
- Margaret Rutherford: A blithe spirit (1983)
- The Two Worlds of Pearl S. Buck (1992)
- The Great White Owl of Sissinghurst (1993)
- She-Crab Soup (1994)
- Dawn: A Charleston Legend (1995)
