= Victoria "Porkchop" Parker =

American drag queen and actor

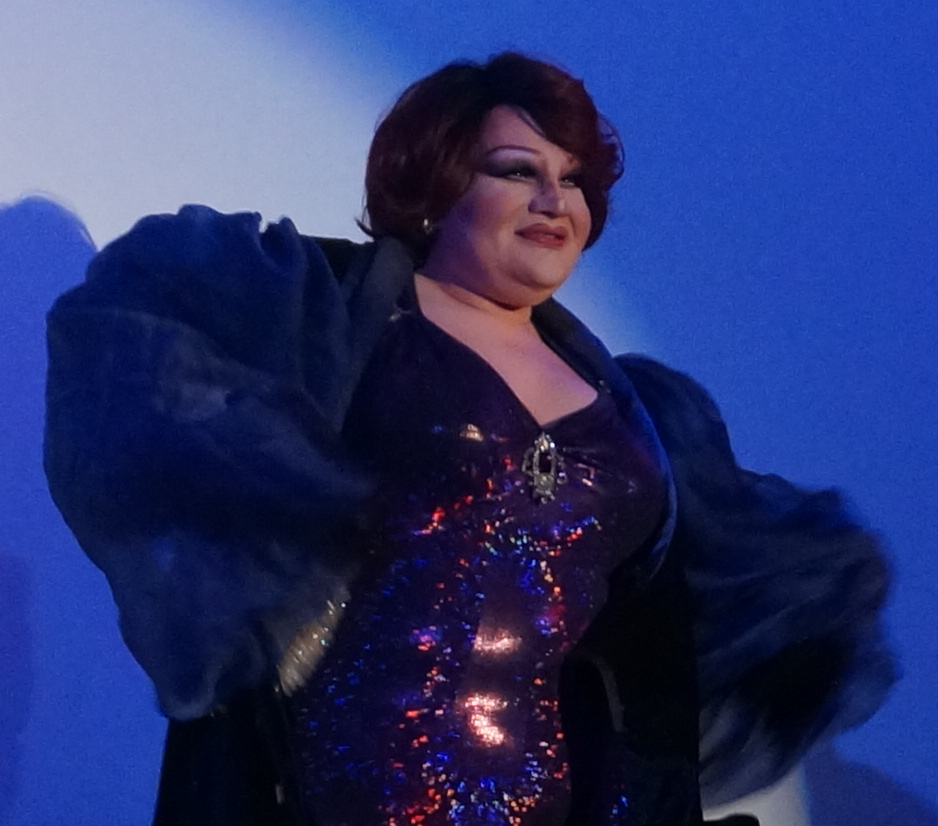
- Victoria "Porkchop" Parker in 2017
- Born: Victor Ray Bowling; January 16, 1970 (age 56); Anderson, South Carolina, U.S.
- Occupations: Drag queen; actor
- Known for: RuPaul's Drag Race (season 1)

Victor Ray Bowling (born 16 January 1970), known by his stage persona Victoria "Porkchop" Parker, is an American drag queen and actor who came to international attention on the first season of RuPaul's Drag Race. He is notable in part for being the first contestant ever eliminated in the history of the franchise. Bowling has also appeared elsewhere on television in and out of drag, and he has also served as a backup dancer for Miley Cyrus.

Bowling has been deemed one of the show's most successful and recognizable drag queens. Although finishing last on his season of Drag Race, Bowling has won over 100 pageants in his career as a drag queen and has toured internationally. He has frequently appeared as a guest on later seasons of Drag Race, with RuPaul often explicitly paying him homage due to his position as the first eliminated contestant in the show's history.

Due to her nickname "Porkchop", the nickname is also given to all queens that are first eliminated from the show.

== Early life ==
Bowling was born in Anderson, South Carolina, and raised in Fayetteville, North Carolina. He attended E.E. Smith High School. During his childhood, he attended youth theater at Cape Fear Regional Theater, and also partook in show choir. He was kicked out of his parents' home for being gay.

== Career ==
=== Pageants ===
Bowling began performing in drag for the first time on January 16, 1987, his seventeenth birthday. He accompanied his friend to a predominantly African American local gay bar, both of them dressed in an attempt at drag, and watched a drag pageant that was occurring at the bar that night. The next month, he performed in a talent show at the bar while dressed in clothes that he had secretly borrowed from his mother and wore no wig, only showing his natural hair, which was styled "like Jessica Fletcher" (from Murder, She Wrote). Despite receiving boos, he was informed that he had potential as an entertainer. In June 1988, he became the first Caucasian person to win the club's pageant title. He started seriously competing in drag pageants in 1990, with his first being the Miss Gay USofA at Large 1990. His original drag name, Victoria Renee Parker, emerged as a combination of "Victoria", a feminized version of his birth name, Victor, "Renee", a name that he simply found "very pretty" (and shared the same first initial of his birth middle name, Ray), and "Parker", a homage to 1985 Miss North Carolina Joni Bennett Parker, who was a Fayetteville native. He almost selected his name to be "Victoria Renee Bennett", still as an homage to Joni, but didn't want a situation to arise where, after a show, his co-performers would say "Oh, she’s Bennett". (Note: ”Bennett” is pronounced the same as “been it”, an expression that describes someone similar to a "has-been".) He was known by the aforementioned name until around 1995–96, where his nickname was given to him by his drag mother, Carmella Marcella Garcia, after Bowling's ability to cook pork chops. Garcia "adopted" Bowling as her drag daughter after watching him compete for the title of Miss Gay North Carolina America. Bowling initially reacted with disdain the first time that Garcia introduced him as "Porkchop Parker", although it eventually grew on him, and he has described it as "more memorable" than his previous drag name, and "a great gimmick". He has won over 100 pageants, including Miss Continental Plus 2003 and Miss'd America 2013. At the time of his Miss Continental Plus win, he had been working at The Connection, a gay bar in Louisville, Kentucky, and had previously placed as first runner-up at the 1996 edition of Miss Continental Plus.

=== Film and television ===
Bowling was in the documentary Trantasia, which documented the undergoing of The World's Most Beautiful Transsexual Contest, and was filmed in Las Vegas. Bowling was scouted for the competition and competed, despite the fact that he did not identify as transsexual. The documentary debuted in 2006. In 2008, he appeared in the documentary film Pageant with Alyssa Edwards and other queens detailing their experience on Miss Gay America.

In 2015, Bowling made a minor appearance along with Chad Michaels in an episode of 2 Broke Girls. He was a backup dancer with 30 other drag queens for Miley Cyrus's 2015 VMA Awards performance.

Bowling was on the E! show Botched (Season 3, episode 4) to fix the silicone problems with his nose, including a point where the skin was starting to decay.

In 2020, Bowling made an appearance in Chappell Roan’s music video for Pink Pony Club.

==== RuPaul's Drag Race ====
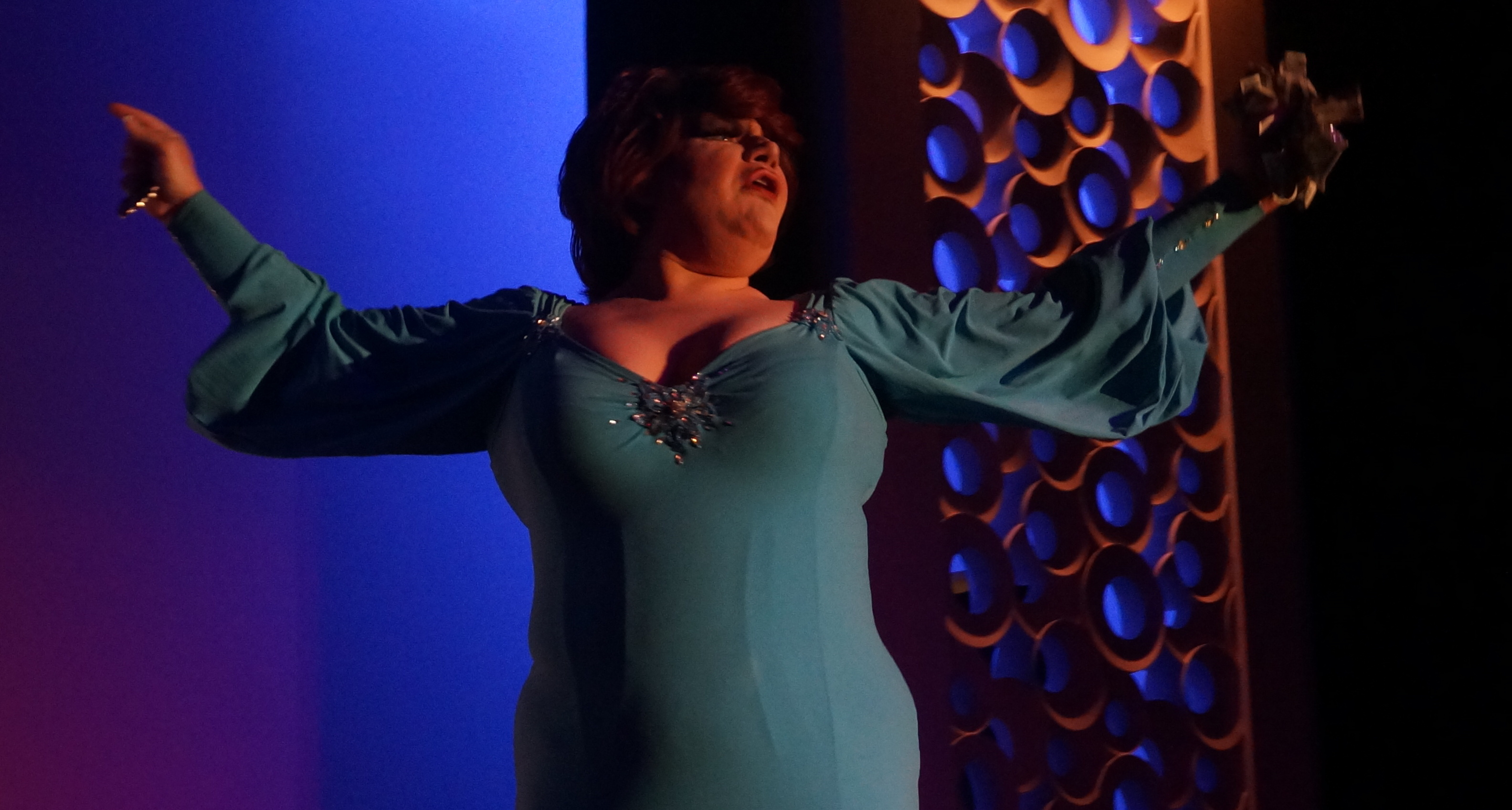
Performing in 2017

Bowling was announced as one of the nine contestants for the inaugural season of RuPaul's Drag Race on February 2, 2009. Prior to his casting, he had been hosting shows at Legends Nightclub in Raleigh, had just won Miss Gay DC, and had competed in the 2008 edition of Miss Gay America. He has been described as the season's only older and plus-sized queen. Bowling was eliminated during the first episode, becoming the very first contestant ever eliminated in the history of the show. He was sent home by Akashia. Because of this, RuPaul always addresses him with "Hey Porkchop" during all of the Drag Race live reunions, starting with season 4.

Bowling has been brought back on the show by RuPaul several times, in homage to being the first contestant ever eliminated. He appeared during the recap episode of RuPaul's Drag Race: All Stars 2 and was featured in winning queen Alaska's rap. Bowling was also brought back for the first episode of season 10 of RuPaul's Drag Race to help judge the mini-challenge. In 2019, he appeared as a guest for the first challenge in the premiere of season eleven of Drag Race posing with Soju.

In the first episode of RuPaul's Drag Race: All Stars 3, Vanessa Hudgens lip synced against "Porkchop", an actual pork chop, which RuPaul said was Bowling.

In March 2018, Variety said that Bowling was one of the 10 most successful drag queens in their careers after the show. He has toured internationally.

As of 2018, Bowling was still publicly vying for a spot on RuPaul's Drag Race: All Stars. Daniel Welsh of Huffington Post wrote "we're surprised contestants like Jessica Wild, Ongina and even Victoria "Porkchop" Parker are still sitting on the shelf, waiting to be plucked up for All Stars." Since then, both Ongina and Jessica Wild have been featured on the fifth and eighth seasons of All Stars, respectively, although Bowling is yet to appear back on the show.

== Personal life ==
Bowling was attacked at a gay bar which resulted in a gunshot wound and acid damage on his face, requiring surgery. He had silicone injections done by an unlicensed nurse in 1999, resulting in granuloma. After his appearance on Drag Race, he moved to Lumberton, North Carolina, and then to Los Angeles, California.

His father died in 1993 of cancer.

== Filmography ==
=== Film ===
Year	Title	Role	Notes
2021	The Bitch Who Stole Christmas	Bertram	

=== Television ===
Date	Title	Character	Work	Ref.
2006	Trantasia	Himself	Documentary	
2008	Pageant	Himself	Documentary	
2009–2025	RuPaul's Drag Race	Himself	Reality television	
2015	2 Broke Girls	Protester	Sitcom	
2015	2015 MTV Video Music Awards	Dancer for Miley Cyrus	Awards show	
2016	Botched	Himself	Reality television	
2017	Hey Qween!	Himself	Talk show	
2020	AJ and the Queen	Porkchop	Netflix original	

=== Music videos ===
Year	Title	Artist	Ref.
2020	"Pink Pony Club"	Chappell Roan	

=== Web series ===
Year	Title	Role	Notes	Ref.
2013	RuPaul Drives	Himself	Guest	
2013	Ring My Bell	Himself	Guest	
2013	WOW Shopping Network	Himself	Recurring guest	
2016	The Pit Stop	Himself	Guest	

== Awards and nominations ==
Year	Award-giving body	Category	Work	Results	Ref.
2022	The Queerties	Future All-Star	Himself	Nominated	
