= Slaves in the Family =

Nonfiction book by Edward Ball

- First edition
- Author: Edward Ball
- Original title: Slaves in the Family
- Language: English
- Published: Ballantine Books
- Media type: Print
- Pages: 505
- Awards: National Book Award; Ambassador Book Award for American Studies
- ISBN: 0345431057

Slaves in the Family (1998) is a biographical historical account written by Edward Ball, whose family historically owned large plantations and numerous slaves in South Carolina.

== Synopsis ==
The author explores his family origins, dating to his English immigrant ancestors to America and their becoming major planters in South Carolina. Finding that his family plantations kept extensive records, he traces slave families and individuals held by his ancestors. Ball follows the stories of these people over many years as the families dispersed. Over time, his family earned the reputation as "the most prominent of South Carolina plantation owners."

The author explores genealogy and history, via interviewing descendants from both groups. The African-American families included mixed-race descendants of one or more of his white family ancestors. Stories from the black families are intense and varied, practically lacking in any kind of bitterness. The book depicts his family as being not the cruelest of slave owners.

== Awards ==
- National Book Award (1998)
- Ambassador Book Award for American Studies (1999)
- New York Times bestseller

== See also ==
- Children of the plantation, a euphemism to describe the mixed-race offspring of enslaved women and their white owners or overseers
