= Dancing Queen (American TV series) =

American documentary reality television series

- Starring: Alyssa Edwards
- Country of origin: United States
- Original language: English
- No. of seasons: 1
- No. of episodes: 8

Production
- Executive producers: Fenton Bailey; Randy Barbato; Tom Campbell; Roy Orecchio; RuPaul Charles
- Running time: 45 mins
- Production company: World of Wonder Productions

Original release
- Network: Netflix
- Release: October 5, 2018

Dancing Queen is an American documentary reality television series featuring Alyssa Edwards, that debuted on Netflix on October 5, 2018.

== Cast ==
- Alyssa Edwards, owner and artistic director at Beyond Belief Dance Company
- Shangela Laquifa Wadley, Alyssa's friend and drag daughter
- Laganja Estranja, Alyssa's friend, drag daughter
- Marcella Raneri, assistant director at Beyond Belief
- Dawn Robbins, manager of Beyond Belief
- Celeste Robbins, choreographer, and assistant director as well as dancer for 8 years at Beyond Belief
- Nick, a dance teacher at Beyond Belief.
- Shelly, a former dance mom at Beyond Belief
- Robbie and Neil, costume designers for Alyssa and some of the students at Beyond Belief
- Kristen, Willow's mother
- Kelly, Ainsley's mother

=== Students ===
- Ainsley, a 7-year-old girl who makes the mini travelling elite team
- Athena, a 7-year-old girl who auditions for the mini travelling elite team but doesn't make the cut
- Leigha, a 10-year-old girl with spina bifida who auditions for the mini travelling elite team.
- Josie, a 15-year-old girl who has been dancing with the company for 9 years.
- Kiana, a 16-year-old girl who has been dancing with the company for 9 years. She makes the senior travelling elite team
- Willow, a 17-year-old girl who makes the senior travelling elite team
- Makenna, a 16-year-old girl who makes the elite travelling team
- Molly, 17-year-old girl who makes the elite travelling team
- Kennedy, 16-year-old girl who makes the elite travelling team
- Riley, 16-year-old girl who makes the elite travelling team
- Brooke, 16-year-old girl who makes the elite travelling team
- Gabe Flowers, 18-year-old boy who makes the elite travelling team

== Episodes ==
No.	Title	Original release date
1	"Get to Werk!"	October 5, 2018
Alyssa announces that Beyond Belief will be going on tour across the country and holds auditions for a Beyond Belief Elite and Mini Elite teams to travel alongside him. Alyssa later officiates the wedding of two of his good friends who are the main designers for costumes for Alyssa and the students at Beyond Belief.
2	"Man, I Feel Like a Woman"	October 5, 2018
Alyssa visits his childhood home while on the journey of buying his own house after being approved for a mortgage. Rehearsals begin for the elite travelling teams and Alyssa hosts an outdoor get together for the mothers of the students at Beyond Belief which gets personal.
3	"Wrecking Ball"	October 5, 2018
4	"Alyssa's Secrets"	October 5, 2018
5	"Music Mishap"	October 5, 2018
6	"Dragsgiving"	October 5, 2018
7	"Reigning Supreme"	October 5, 2018
8	"Always and Forever, Alyssa Edwards"	October 5, 2018

== See also ==
- List of original programs distributed by Netflix
