= Alyssa Edwards =

American drag performer and choreographer (born 1980)

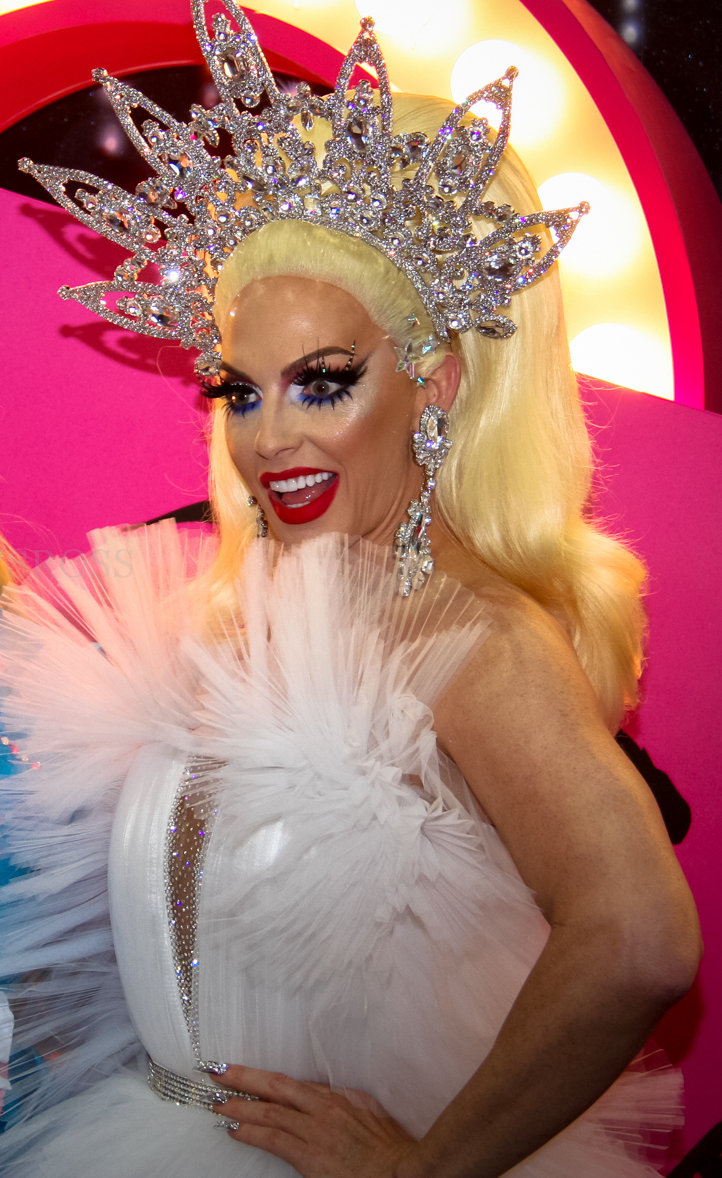
- Alyssa Edwards in 2019
- Born: Justin Dwayne Lee Johnson; January 16, 1980 (age 46); Mesquite, Texas, U.S.
- Education: Ranger College; University of North Texas
- Occupations: Drag queen; dance teacher; dancer; TV personality
- Known for: RuPaul's Drag Race (season 5); RuPaul's Drag Race All Stars (season 2); RuPaul's Drag Race Global All Stars (season 1) winner
- Website: Official website

Justin Dwayne Lee Johnson (born January 16, 1980), best known by the stage name Alyssa Edwards, is an American drag performer, choreographer, and businessperson. Edwards was known for competing in drag pageantry (notably Miss Gay America 2010) before rising to international attention as a contestant on the fifth season of RuPaul's Drag Race, becoming a fan favorite during and after her time on the show. Edwards subsequently appeared on the second season of RuPaul's Drag Race All Stars and starred in her own web series, Alyssa's Secret. She won the first ever season of RuPaul's Drag Race Global All Stars, making her the first queen to be inducted into the "Newly Constructed International Pavilion At the Drag Race Hall of Fame".

Johnson lives in Mesquite, Texas, where he owns and operates a dance studio, Beyond Belief Dance Company. Johnson and his dance studio are the centerpieces of a docuseries, Dancing Queen, produced by RuPaul and World of Wonder that premiered on October 5, 2018, on Netflix.

== Early life ==
Justin Dwayne Lee Johnson was born on January 16, 1980, to Jimmy Harold Johnson and Sherrie Ann Laye in Mesquite, Texas. He was one of seven children in the working-class family, and has described his mother as "the wind beneath (his) wings" and his father as "very, very masculine." Growing up, Justin's sisters were cheerleaders, and he often found himself wishing he could join in on their practices. Described as a shy and creative child with no interest in sports, he enjoyed watching The Wizard of Oz and dancing and singing tunes such as Rod Stewart’s "Forever Young" in his front yard, to the discouragement of his father. Justin was supported by his openly gay Uncle Bobby, who supplied him with a role as an extra in a local production of Brigadoon and financed his enrollment in an all-boys jazz dance class at the Joy Sharp School of Dance in Mesquite, and was only allowed to attend when his father was informed that the son of a local baseball coach attended the class as well. Johnson’s parents divorced around the time he was in high school, when he attended West Mesquite High School and volunteered as an instructor and choreographer for the local peewee drill team. After high school, he attended Ranger College before transferring to the University of North Texas, where he was briefly a part of the college cheer squad and came out as gay.

== Career ==
=== Early career ===
While attending University of North Texas, Johnson became involved in Dallas's drag community after friends took him to the Rose Room at Village Station in Oak Lawn, Dallas, where he saw his first drag show. He soon became a regular at the venue before entering an amateur drag competition, where he performed in drag for the first time. Drawing on the makeup skills his sisters had taught him, he slicked back his platinum blond hair "like Annie Lennox". When the emcee asked for a stage name, he chose "Alyssa" after actress Alyssa Milano, whose television work he had enjoyed as a child. His drag surname, "Edwards", was later given to him by his mentor and drag mother, Laken Edwards.

During this period, Edwards also founded the Haus of Edwards, a drag family that mentors and supports performers. He became drag mother to several future RuPaul's Drag Race contestants, including Shangela, Laganja Estranja, Gia Gunn, Vivienne Pinay, and Plastique Tiara.

=== Pageantry ===
Beginning in the mid-2000s, Edwards competed in drag pageantry across the United States. In 2005, he won Miss Gay Texas America and, over the following several years, competed in regional and national pageants, placing as a finalist or alternate in several editions of Miss Gay America while also winning titles including Miss Gay USofA, Miss Texas Continental, and All American Goddess.

In 2009, Edwards won Miss Gay America 2010. He also appeared in the documentary Pageant, which followed contestants preparing for the 34th Miss Gay America pageant in 2006.

Less than a year later, on December 9, 2010, the Miss Gay America organization stripped Edwards of the title, citing business dealings that conflicted with the organization's rules for titleholders. First alternate Coco Montrese replaced Edwards as the winner of Miss Gay America. Edwards was also stripped of his All American Goddess title later that year.

=== Ongoing career ===
Edwards appeared in the 2008 documentary Pageant. The film focused on the 34th Miss Gay America pageant of 2006.

In November 2012, Logo announced that Edwards was among 14 drag queens who would be competing on the fifth season of RuPaul's Drag Race. Also performing on the show was pageant friend and rival Coco Montrese.

Edwards performed and won in the ballet-themed main challenge in the "Black Swan: Why It Gotta Be Black?" episode of Rupaul's Drag Race. As part of the show, Edwards sang on the "We Are the World"-inspired song "Can I Get an Amen?" The song's proceeds helped benefit the Los Angeles Gay and Lesbian Center. Edwards was eliminated in episode nine, following a lip sync against Coco Montrese, and finished in sixth place. Edwards has also been a special guest on the podcast series run by RuPaul and Michelle Visage called RuPaul: What's The Tee?

She was one of thirty drag queens featured in Miley Cyrus's 2015 VMA performance.

Edwards is also known for her web series titled "Alyssa's Secret". The series stars Alyssa Edwards speaking on a multitude of subjects and often features guests including other members of the Haus of Edwards. The webseries is produced and premieres through World of Wonder Productions.

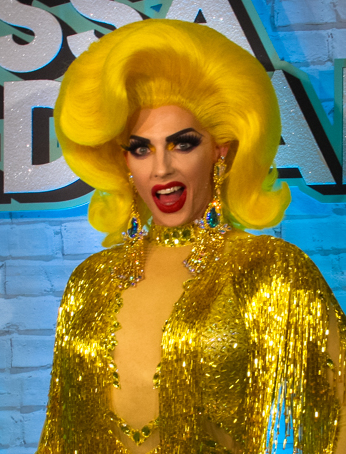
Alyssa Edwards at RuPaul's DragCon LA in 2018

In 2016, Edwards returned as one of 10 contestants in Season 2 of RuPaul's Drag Race: All Stars, ending in fifth place. Edwards won the main challenge of the third episode titled "HERstory of the World", playing Annie Oakley in a performance featuring other famous women throughout history. She was then eliminated in episode four "Drag Movie Shequels", after playing Bland in "Wha' Ha' Happened to Baby JJ", a parody of "What Ever Happened to Baby Jane?", with Alaska as Baby JJ.

Edwards returned in episode five "Revenge of the Queens" by winning a chance to reenter the competition, winning a comedy challenge with Alaska followed by a lip sync of Rihanna's "Shut Up and Drive", in which both Edwards and Tatianna won. Edwards was then controversially eliminated a second time by Detox in episode seven "A Family that Drags Together", coming in fifth place overall.

In 2018, Edwards hosted a three-day promotional retreat for Tazo, called "Camp TAZO".

In 2019, Edwards released a makeup palette in collaboration with Anastasia Beverly Hills. In Episode 2 of All Stars 5, Alyssa made a guest appearance as a "Lip Sync Assassin", where she lip-synced against Shea Couleé, but lost. Edwards was shortlisted for the fourth season of RuPaul's Drag Race but was cast as an alternate and instead was on the fifth season of RuPaul's Drag Race.

Edwards appeared on the tenth season of RuPaul's Drag Race as a choreographer for PharmaRusical and on the seventh episode of the eleventh season of RuPaul's Drag Race as a runway coach. In June 2019, a panel of judges from New York magazine placed her fifth on their list of "the most powerful drag queens in America", a ranking of 100 former RuPaul's Drag Race contestants.

In 2021, Edwards appeared on the 16th season of America's Got Talent, accompanying members of Beyond Belief as they auditioned for a spot in the competition. In June 2021, Edwards had a one-woman show on London's West End entitled Alyssa: Memoirs of a Queen. The autobiographical show ran for eight performances, featuring tales from her childhood to "reality TV apotheosis".

In 2024, Alyssa was crowned as the winner of the debut season of RuPaul's Drag Race Global All Stars, making her the first queen to be inducted into the "Newly Constructed International Pavilion At the Drag Race Hall of Fame".

In 2025, Alyssa appeared on Canada's Drag Race, Season 6, to help the contestants with the Reading Challenge and serve as a judge on one episode.

== Titles ==
Edwards competed in and won numerous pageant titles. They include:

- Miss Gay Texas America 2004, first alternate
- Miss Gay Texas America 2005, winner
- Miss Gay America 2005, second alternate
- Miss Northwest Regional Representative 2005, winner
- Miss Gay America 2006, third alternate
- Miss Texas FFI 2006, winner
- Miss Gay USofA 2006, winner
- Miss Texas Continental 2007, winner
- Miss Shining Star Continental 2009, winner
- Miss Gay Mid East America 2008, first alternate
- Miss Gay America 2009, third alternate
- Miss Gay Heartland America 2009, first alternate
- Miss Gay Heartland America 2010, first alternate
- Miss Gay America 2010, winner
- Southern Elegance All American Goddess 2010, winner
- All American Goddess 2010, winner
- National Entertainer of the Year, FI 2014, first alternate

== RuPaul's Drag Race ==
=== Season 5 ===
In 2012, It was announced that Edwards had been cast on the fifth season of RuPaul's Drag Race. Where she was cast alongside Coco Montrese, who she had fallen out with over Edwards being unable to complete her run as Miss Gay America 2010 and being replaced by Montrese. The two's history led to many arguments and dramatic moments throughout the season. A ballet challenge win in the fourth episode gave Edwards immunity, saving her from being in the bottom two in the following episode after a negatively received Katy Perry snatch game performance, but RuPaul still asked Edwards to apologize to Perry on Twitter due to the performance. In episode 7, after Edwards performed weakly in a stand-up roast challenge she was placed in the bottom two alongside Roxxxy Andrews, where both would be allowed to stay in the competition after a strong lip-sync to “Whip My Hair” by Willow Smith. Edwards would fall in the bottom two for a second time in the following episode where she would send home Ivy Winters in a lip sync to Gwen Guthrie's “Ain't Nothin' Goin' On but the Rent”. Alyssa's time on the season would come to a finish in episode 9, where another poor challenge performance lead to a close lip sync to Paula Abdul's “Cold Hearted” against rival Coco Montrese, where Montrese emerged victorious and Edwards was eliminated in sixth place (a lovely ‘fifth alternative’).

=== All Stars 2 ===
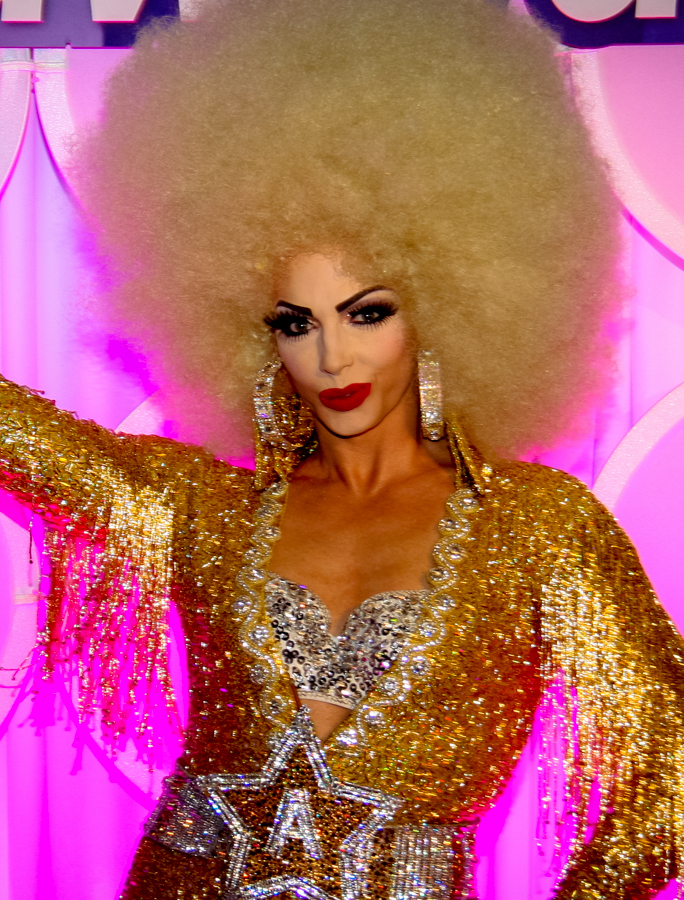
Alyssa Edwards at RuPaul's DragCon LA in 2017

Due to positive fan reception, in 2016 it was announced that Alyssa Edwards had been cast on the second season of RuPaul's Drag Race All Stars. The cast included four other queens from season 5, including her season 5 nemesis, Coco Montrese. However, upon Montrese's entrance, it is revealed that the pair had since reconciled. A solid performance in the episode 1 talent show meant that Edwards was safe, yet her former rival was less lucky as Roxxxy Andrews eliminated Montrese first. In episode 3, Edwards' strong performance as Annie Oakley in a "rusical" challenge placed her in the top 2 for her first time in the season against Detox, where Edwards would win the lip sync to Taylor Dayne's “Tell It to My Heart” and chose to eliminate Ginger Minj over Katya. In the following episode, Edwards was eliminated by Alaska over Roxxxy Andrews and Katya.

In episode 5, eliminated queens were given a chance to re-enter the competition by pairing up with a queen who was still in the game. Edwards was paired with Alaska, and the pair were in the top 2 alongside Detox and the previously eliminated Tatianna. In a lip sync to Rihanna's “Shut Up and Drive,” both queens were allowed to re-enter the competition and eliminate one of the bottom two. Both chose to eliminate Phi Phi O'Hara. In the seventh episode, Edwards was controversially eliminated by Detox over Andrews and Alaska on the anniversary of her mother's death and one episode before the finale, a move which many saw as unfair as Detox, Alaska, and Andrews had a strong friendship and many thought that Edwards had not deserved to be in the bottom for the episode. Edwards finished in fifth place on All Stars 2.

== Filmography ==
=== Film ===
Year	Title	Role	Notes
2008	Pageant	Herself	Documentary
2016	Hurricane Bianca	Ambrosia Salad	Comedy
2018	Hurricane Bianca 2	Ambrosia Salad	Comedy
2020	The Queens	Herself	Documentary

=== Television ===
Year	Title	Notes
2010	My Life as Liz	Episode: ""Liz's Got Talent? (Part 1)""
2013	RuPaul's Drag Race	Contestant; Season 5, 11 episodes (6th place)
2013	RuPaul's Drag Race: Untucked	Companion show to RuPaul's Drag Race
2013	NewNowNext Awards	
2015–16	Skin Wars	2 episodes
2015–16	RuPaul's Drag Race All Stars	Contestant; Season 2, 8 episodes (5th place)
2016–17	Gay for Play Game Show Starring RuPaul	2 episodes
2016	Watch What Happens Live with Andy Cohen	Guest
2018	RuPaul's Drag Race	Season 10, Episode 2
2018	Dancing Queen	Docuseries, 8 episodes
2019	RuPaul's Drag Race	Season 11, Episode 7
2019	The Bachelorette	Season 15, Episode 2
2020	RuPaul's Secret Celebrity Drag Race	Mentor, 2 episodes
2020	RuPaul's Drag Race All Stars (season 5)	Guest ("Lipsync Assassin")
2020	RuPaul's Drag Race All Stars: Untucked (season 2)	Guest ("Lipsync Assassin")
2020	MTV Cribs	Season 2, Episode 4
2021	America's Got Talent	Season 16
2024	The GOAT	Contestant; Season 1, 10 episodes (9th place)
2024	RuPaul's Drag Race Global All Stars	Contestant; 12 episodes (Winner)
2024	Drag Race España	Guest ("The Grand Grand Finale")
2025	RuPaul's Drag Race	Special guest; Season 17, Episode 7
2025	Drag Race Philippines: Slaysian Royale	Guest judge; Season 1, 2 episodes
2025	Slaycation	Main cast; Season 2, 6 episodes
2026	RuPaul's Drag Race	Special guest; Season 18, Episode 11

=== Music videos ===
Year	Title	Artist	Ref.
2019	"The Supreme	Herself	
2020	"I Can't"	Rigel Gemini	
2020	"Mask, Gloves, Soap, Scrubs"	Todrick Hall	

=== Web series ===
Year	Title	Role	Notes
2013–present	Alyssa's Secret	Self	Produced by World of Wonder
2014	Be$tie$ For Ca$h	Self	Guest
2014	Transformations: with James St. James	Self	Guest
2017	Once Upon A Crime	Princess Belle	Produced by Todrick Hall
2019	Werq the World	Self	Produced by World of Wonder
2019	Alyssa Raw	Self	Produced by World of Wonder
2020	Headlines with Alyssa Edwards	Self	Produced by World of Wonder
2020	Served! with Jade Thirlwall	Self	Produced by MTV
2020	God Shave the Queens	Self	Produced by World of Wonder
2021	Drag Queens React	Self	Produced by World of Wonder
2023	The Pit Stop	Self	Produced by World of Wonder

== Awards and nominations ==
Year	Award-giving body	Category	Work	Results	Ref.
2018	WOWIE Awards	People That Inspire Us	Herself	Won	
2019	WOWIE Awards	Best TV Moment	The Bachelorette (with Alaska Thunderfuck)	Nominated	
2019	Queerty Awards	Drag Royalty	Herself	Nominated	
