= Miss Gay America =

Annual competition in the United States

Miss Gay America Pageant
- Formation: 1972
- Type: Beauty pageant
- Headquarters: Frederick, Maryland
- Owner: 2 Queens and a Princess LLC, Monica Mitchells
- Current Titleholder: Tracy La Louisianne
- Website: www.missgayamerica.com

Miss Gay America is a national pageant for female impersonators. Established in 1972, the pageant is based on the Miss America contest and follows a similar format.

Each year, contestants compete at various city, state, and direct regional preliminaries for the opportunity to advance to the official Miss Gay America pageant. Titleholders are often seen as the best in the industry and are frequently hired to entertain in a variety of venues, such as Las Vegas shows, cruise ships, and LGBT events.

The Miss Gay America pageant system is the longest running pageant system for female impersonators. It is one of the four major pageant systems for the art form, in addition to Continental Pageantry, Gay USofA Pageantry, and Entertainer of the Year. Miss Gay America is unique in that it is the only national pageant that prohibits contestants from using female hormones or having undergone any feminizing plastic surgery, such as breast implants or liquid-silicone injections below the neck.

Lady Gaga, on the 10th of September 2017, was crowned as the first Honorary Miss Gay America.

The current Miss Gay America titleholder is Tracy La Louisianne, the 54th titleholder, crowned on January 16, in Little Rock, Arkansas.

== History ==
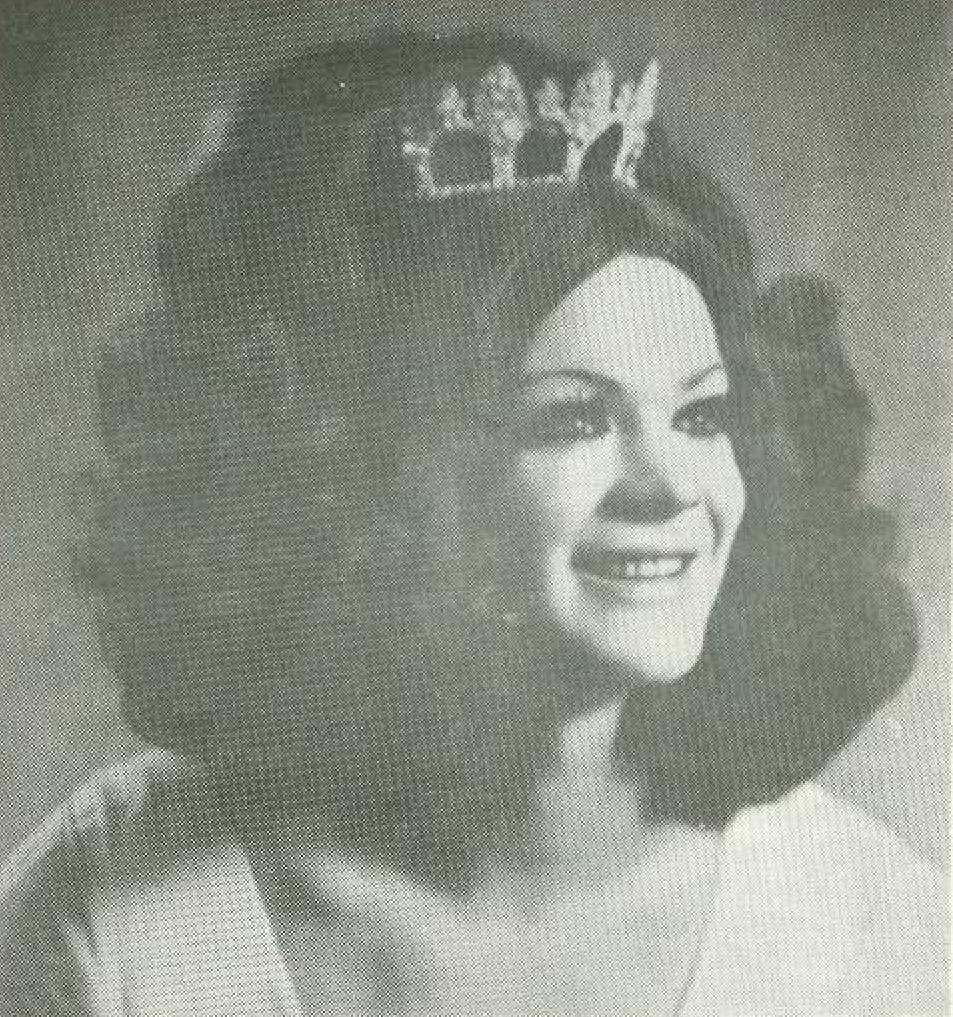
Norma Kristie, the first winner of Miss Gay America.

In 1971, Jerry Peek opened the Watch Your Hat & Coat Saloon in Nashville, Tennessee, the city's first gay dance and show bar. Having an understanding of the female illusionist state pageants occurring in various show bars in other states, Peek decided to establish a national level pageant to further recognize the best entertainers. On June 25, 1972, the first pageant was held at Peek's Nashville saloon. Norman Jones, performing as Norma Kristie, competed representing Arkansas and was crowned the winner of the 1973 pageant and emeritus titleholder of the Miss Gay America Pageant system. In 1975, Jones assumed ownership of the pageant and later formed Norma Kristie, Inc., operating and directing the Miss Gay America pageant and the Mr. Gay All-America Contest systems. In 2005, Norman Jones retired from the pageant's regular operations and sold the Miss Gay America pageantry system to Larry Tyger and Terry Eason of L&T Entertainment. On February 4, 2016, Michael Dutzer and Rob Mansman of Mad Angel Entertainment purchased the Miss Gay America pageant From L & T Entertainment.

At the 2016 pageant in Memphis, Mad Angel Entertainment announced they will be retiring the solo talent category. Starting in 2017 Presentation will be judged for the top 10 contestants in its place. Also starting in 2017 contestants are able to change their talent numbers on the final night of the competition.

Mad Angel Entertainment announced in January 2017 that they will be bringing back Mr. Gay All-American as Mr. Gay America. The pageant was held on July 2, 2017, in Dallas, Texas with the winner being Kyle Ean. The contest winners included Judas Elliot, and Simba Hall in 2018 and 2019. In 2021 following the coronavirus pandemic, Prideland Productions, an entity formed by Simba Hall succeeded to maintain control and operations of the Mr division of the system, with a contest scheduled to be held in August 2021 in Las Vegas, NV.

== Qualification ==
Contestants for the national Miss Gay America pageant qualify through franchised state and direct regional preliminaries. The winner and first alternate of the preliminary contests advance to the national pageant. Many states require contestants to first compete in franchised city preliminaries, where the winner and first alternate advance to the state pageant.

== Competition ==
Historically, pageant competition consisted of interview, evening gown and talent categories. Later a Contemporary Fashion category for sportswear was added. After about a decade it was changed to Creative Fashion, a category that was never fully understood by judges or contestants and was later changed to Creative Costume. It was eventually replaced with Solo Talent. While some of the contestants perform live vocal, dance or comedy skits, the vast majority showcase their talent of lip syncing to prerecorded music. Current categories are Personal Interview, Solo Talent, Evening Gown, On-Stage Interview, and Talent.

Currently, the national pageant consists of 3 nights of preliminary competition, where all contestants compete in male interview, solo talent, evening gown, and production talent. Awards for each night of these categories are presented on the 4th night of the pageant week during the official Miss Gay America Revue Show, where former titleholders return to entertain. The final competition night is held on the fifth night, typically at a larger and more formal venue, and the top 10 finalists are announced. These finalists then compete again in evening gown, stage interview, and production talent. At the end of the final pageant, the top four runners-up are announced and the winner is crowned.

=== List of winners ===
Miss Gay America winners
| Year | Titleholder | Given name | Crowning venue | First Alternate | Second Alternate | Notes |
|---|---|---|---|---|---|---|
| 1973 | Norma Kristie | Norman Jones | Watch Your Hat & Coat Saloon; Nashville, Tennessee | Charlie Brown | Genie Dee | As the first Miss Gay America titleholder, Norma Kristie holds the title of Miss Gay America Emeritus. In 1975, she assumed ownership of the pageant and ran it until his retirement in 2005. |
| 1974 | Lady Baronessa | Carmel Santiago | The Glass Menagerie Nightclub; Nashville, Tennessee | Roski Fenandez | Billie Eggs | Lady Baronessa's full name was "The Lady Baroness Maria Andrea Del Santiago". Lady Baronessa assisted in the operations of Norma Kristie, Inc. until her death in 1992. |
| 1975 | Shawn Luis | Shawn Ocampo | Atlanta Americana Hotel Ballroom; Atlanta, Georgia | Roski Fernandez | | |
| 1976-A | Shan Covington | Shan Covington | The Depository Nightclub; Houston, Texas | Michael Andrews | Dani Daletto, Miss Gay Michigan America | Title revoked for unbecoming conduct. |
| 1976-B | Dani Daletto | Jose Mondelano | Vapors Nightclub; Hot Springs, Arkansas | | | Dani Daletto was crowned in a special ceremony at the 1976 Miss Gay South Pageant held at Vapors Nightclub in Hot Springs, Arkansas. |
| 1977 | Michael Andrews | Michael Androlewicz | The Old Plantation Nightclub; Houston, Texas | Naomi Sims, Miss Gay Texas America | Shannon Forrester | Michael Andrews also held the 1986 emeritus title of Miss Gay USofA. |
| 1978 | Jimi Dee | Jimmy Dillard | Machinist's Hall; St. Louis, Missouri | Hot Chocolate, Miss Gay Texas America | Lady Shawn | Jimi Dee was best known for her illusion of Diana Ross. |
| 1979 | Rachel Wells | John Greenwell | Fox Theater; Atlanta, Georgia | Hot Chocolate | Lady Shawn | |
| 1980 | Hot Chocolate | Larry Edwards | Atlanta Convention Center; Atlanta, Georgia | Lady Shawn, Miss Gay Texas America | Dana Manchester | Hot Chocolate is known for her celebrity female impersonations of Tina Turner. She also appeared in the films What's Love Got to Do With It and Miss Congeniality 2. |
| 1981 | Lady Shawn | Shawn Marshall | Masonic Temple; Detroit, Michigan | Genevieve Ryder, Miss Gay Missouri America | Jennifer Foxx | |
| 1982 | Jennifer Foxx | Bobby Bruno | Dallas Convention Center; Dallas, Texas | Francesca Wakeland | Tasha Kohl | |
| 1983 | Francesca Wakeland | Jon Meadows | Ovens Auditorium; Charlotte, North Carolina | Naomi Sims, Miss Gay South Regional America | Tasha Kohl, Miss Gay Texas | |
| 1984 | Tasha Kohl | Jerry Faulkner | Oklahoma City Convention Center; Oklahoma City, Oklahoma | Naomi Sims, first alternate to Miss Gay Tri-States Regional America | Stella Starr, Miss Gay North Carolina America | Tasha Kohl is notable for her creative and eccentric costuming and performance choices. She has also held the title of Miss National Entertainer of the Year, 1991. |
| 1985 | Naomi Sims | Newman S. Braud | Dallas Convention Center; Dallas, Texas | Fritz Capone, Miss Gay Kansas America | Melinda Ryder, Miss Gay Missouri America | Naomi Sims was known as the "eyes of Texas" and revered for her stellar dancing skills. Naomi also held the 1990 emeritus title to Miss National Entertainer of the Year, and 1985 National Female Impersonator of the Year. |
| 1986 | Lauren Colby | Robb Robinson | Indianapolis Convention Center; Indianapolis, Indiana | Diana Black, Miss Gay Great Lakes America | Toni Lenoir, Miss Gay North Carolina | Lauren Colby has the unique distinction of being the youngest Miss Gay America ever crowned under the age of 21. |
| 1987 | Blaze Starr | David Brazil | Dallas Convention Center; Dallas, Texas | Cherry Lane, Second Alternate to Miss Gay Arkansas | Kelly Ray | |
| 1988 | Cherry Lane | Michael Smothers | Fox Theater; Atlanta, Georgia | Rachel Masters | Valerie Lohr, Miss Gay Texas America | |
| 1989 | Vicki Vincent | Roger Piatt | Dallas Convention Center; Dallas, Texas | Brandi Alexander, Miss Gay North Regional America | Sweet Savage, Miss Gay Texas America | |
| 1990 | Brandi Alexander | Randy Fenoli | Dallas Convention Center; Dallas, Texas | Valerie Lohr, Miss Gay Midwest America | Tiffany Bonet | Randy Fenoli used his prize money to enroll in the Fashion Institute of Technology. He is currently the television host of Say Yes to the Dress. |
| 1991 | Valerie Lohr | Gary Lytle | Dallas Convention Center; Dallas, Texas | Coco, Miss Gay South Regional America | Tiffany Bonet | |
| 1992 | Tiffany Bonet | Acey Hendricks | Majestic Theater; Dallas, Texas | Leslie Rage | Blair Williams, Miss Gay North Carolina America | |
| 1993 | Leslie Rage | Leslie DeLaCruz | Majestic Theater; Dallas, Texas | Coco | Dieta Pepsi, Miss Gay Heart of America | Leslie Rage declined an opportunity to dance with Siegfried & Roy in Las Vegas in order to serve as Miss Gay America. |
| 1994 | Jacqulyn DeVaroe | Darius Cordell Murray | Majestic Theater; Dallas, Texas | Ramona LeGer' | Coppa LeMay | Jacqulyn DeVaroe also held the title of Miss Gay USofA 1997 and Miss Black Universe 1996. |
| 1995-A | Ramona LeGer' | Louis Marcello | Majestic Theater; Dallas, Texas | Patti Le Plae Safe, First Alternate to Miss Gulf States America | Nicole Dubois, Miss Gay Southern Elegance America | Ramona LeGer' died five months into her reign due to spinal meningitis. |
| 1995-B | Patti Le Plae Safe | Rodd Grey | Robinson Center Music Auditorium; Little Rock, Arkansas | | | Patti Le Plae Safe was crowned Miss Gay America 1995 in a special ceremony prior to the 1996 pageant in Little Rock, Arkansas. Patti holds the record for the shortest reign of all time at 5.5 hours. |
| 1996 | Kerri Nichols | Jeff Capell | Robinson Center Music Auditorium; Little Rock, Arkansas | Lauren Taylor, Miss Gay Texas America | Linda Carrero | |
| 1997 | Lauren Taylor | Darrell Cantu | Ovens Auditorium; Charlotte, North Carolina | Laken Edwards | Lana Eastman | Lauren Taylor also held the title of Miss Gay USofA 1998. |
| 1998 | Maya Montana | | Ovens Auditorium; Charlotte, North Carolina | Linda Carrero, Miss Gay Mid-America | Lana Eastman | |
| 1999 | Linda Carrero | Omar Reyes | Athena Theater; Little Rock, Arkansas | Kirby Colby, Miss Gay West Virginia America | Catia Lee Love | |
| 2000 | Catia Lee Love | Aron Harvey | Lincoln Theater; Washington, D.C. | Charity Case, Miss Gay Southern Elegance America | Kirby Kolby | Catia is also former Miss Gay Oklahoma America 1998, and Miss Gay USofA Classic 2011. |
| 2001 | Charity Case | Marc Coleman | Athena Theater; Little Rock, Arkansas | Sabrina White | Dominique Sanchez | Charity Case competed 11 times at Miss Gay America between 1984 and 2001 before winning the Miss Gay America 2001 title. Charity was the first plus size individual to win the title. |
| 2002 | Sabrina White | Russell Marcum | Dallas Convention Center; Dallas, Texas | Kitty Bob Aimes, Miss Gay Oklahoma America | Angela Dodd | |
| 2003 | Dominique Sanchez | Chris Williams | Athena Theater; Little Rock, Arkansas | Jayda Alexander, Miss Gay Louisiana America | Angela Dodd | Dominique has also held the titles of Miss Gay Arkansas America 1998 and Miss Gay USofA 2010. |
| 2004 | Rachael Erikks | | Athena Theater; Little Rock, Arkansas | Alana Steele, Miss Gay Indiana America | Truly Fabu | |
| 2005 | Raquel Chevallier | Scott Peters | Athena Theater; Little Rock, Arkansas | Alina Meletti, Miss Gay Florida America | Alyssa Edwards | |
| 2006 | Nicole DuBois | Tommy Davis | Cannon Center; Memphis, Tennessee | Coti Collins, Miss Gay East Coast America | Victoria Parker | |
| 2007 | Luscious | | Cannon Center; Memphis, Tennessee | Coti Collins, Miss Gay North Carolina | Chantel Reshae | Luscious has also held the title of Miss Gay USofA 2011. |
| 2008 | Mikayla Kay | Josh Bolin | Holiday Inn Select Airport Grand Ballroom; Memphis, Tennessee | Layla Larue, Miss Gay Southern Elegance America | Victoria DePaula, Miss Gay Midwest America | |
| 2009 | Victoria DePaula | Carl Glorioso | Millennium Hotel Grand Ballroom; St. Louis, Missouri | Chantel Reshae, Miss Gay East Coast America | Coti Collins, Miss Gay Mideast America | |
| 2010-A | Alyssa Edwards | Justin Johnson | Millennium Hotel Ballroom; St. Louis, Missouri | Coco Montrese, Miss Gay Heart of America | Jessica Jade, Miss Gay D.C. America | Title revoked due to scheduling conflicts. |
| 2010-B | Coco Montrese | Martin Cooper | The Grey Fox Nightclub; St. Louis, Missouri | | | |
| 2011 | Coti Collins | David Lowman | Lifestyles Pavilion Auditorium; Columbus, Ohio | Jessica Jade, Miss Gay Mid-East America 2010 | Chantel Reshae, Miss Gay Gulf States America 2010 | Coti Collins is the second longest competing Miss Gay America winner. |
| 2012 | Kirby Kolby | | Capitol Theatre at the Riffe Center; Columbus, Ohio | Jessica Jade, Miss Gay Atlantic States America 2011 | Jenna Skyy, Miss Gay Texas America 2011 | |
| 2013 | Sally Sparkles | Michael Sharp | Sheraton Hotel Ballroom; Columbus, Ohio | Blair Williams, First Alternate to Miss Gay Mid-America 2012 | Jessica Jade, Miss Gay Southern Elegance America2012 | Sally Sparkles was the first contestant to win the title Miss Gay America and Miss Congeniality the same year. |
| 2014 | Jessica Jade | Billy Wilson | Millennium Hotel Ball Room; St. Louis, Missouri | Blair Williams, Miss Gay D.C. America 2013 | Krista Collins, Miss Gay Missouri America 2013 | |
| 2015 | Blair Williams | Todd Mauldin | Millennium Maxwell House Hotel Ball Room; Nashville, Tennessee | Truly Fabu, Miss Gay Eastern States America, 1st Alternate | Kelly Ray, Miss Gay North Carolina America | |
| 2016 | Asia O'Hara | Antwan Lee | Holiday Inn Select Airport Ball Room; Memphis, Tennessee | Kelli Ray Shelton, Miss Gay Southeast America | Dextaci, Miss Gay Southern States America | Asia was the first to be crowned Miss Gay America on her first try since Lauren Colby. Asia is also a former Miss Gay USofA (2007) and All-American Goddess (2012). |
| 2017 | Suzy Wong | Arnold Myint | Holiday Inn Select Airport Ball Room; Memphis, Tennessee | Kelly Ray Shelton, Miss Gay Heart of America 2016 | Sofia Anderson, Miss Gay Texas America 2016 | |
| 2018 | Deva Station | Shane Carpenter | Hyatt Regency Empire Ballroom; New Orleans, Louisiana | Brooke Lynn Hytes, 1st Alternate Miss Gay Heart of America 2017 | Kelly Ray Shelton, Miss Gay New York America 2017 | |
| 2019 | Andora Te’Tee | Michael Collins | Ferrara Theatre; St. Louis, Missouri | Dessie Love Blake, 1st Alternate, 1st alt to Miss Gay New York America 2018 | Sofia Anderson, Miss Gay Nevada America 2018 | |
| 2020 | Pattaya Hart | Methawee (Plu) Sayampol | Gateway Classic Cars Venue; O'Fallon, Illinois | Dextaci, 1st Alternate, Miss Gay Mid-Atlantic America 2019 | Ivy Dripp, Miss Gay Louisiana America 2019 | Pattaya won on her first attempt at MGA. The third person overall to achieve this. |
| 2022 | Dextaci | Dex Poindexter | Robinson Center Auditorium; Little Rock, AR | Shelita Hoyle Bonet, 1st Alternate, Miss Gay Southern America 2021 | Tatiana Voche,2nd alternate, Miss Gay Western States America 2021 | Dextaci was the first reigning Miss Gay America to meet both the standing President (Joe Biden) and Vice President (Kamala Harris) at the signing of the Respect for Marriage Act held December 13, 2022. |
| 2023 | Tatiyanna Voche’ | | Robinson Center Auditorium; Little Rock, AR | Dessie Love Blake, Miss Gay Southwest America 2022 | Barbra Seville, Miss Gay Western States America 2022 | Tatiyanna won representing as Miss Gay DC America 2022. The last person to win Miss Gay America from that prelim was Kirby Kolby, Miss Gay America 2012 |
| 2024 | Dessie Love Blake | Ron Kerr | Robinson Center Auditorium; Little Rock, AR | Aria B. Cassadine, Miss Gay Tennessee America 2023 | Emory Starr, Miss Gay Fancy America 2023 | |
| 2025 | Ivy Dripp | Dustin Gaspard | Robinson Center Auditorium; Little Rock, AR | Divinity Cruzz, Miss Gay Maryland America 2024 | | |
| 2026 | Tracy La Louisianne | Travis Guillory | Robinson Center Auditorium; Little Rock, AR | Barbra Seville, 1st Alternate, Miss Gay Sin City America | Princess Prozac, Miss Gay Heart of America | |

=== Mr. Gay All-American ===
The Mr. Gay All-American Contest was founded by Norma Kristie, Inc. in 1983 by the operators of Miss Gay America, Norman Jones and Carmel Santiago (Lady Baronessa, Miss Gay America 1974). The MGAA Contest was started to provide a venue for gay men to showcase their intellect, community service, and talent. It launched careers in professional entertainment for many young gay men. MGAA was the first contest of its kind, and its winner was considered to be the co-titleholder to Miss Gay America.

In 1995, Jones sold the Mr. Gay All-American Contest to Gib Hauersperger, who had been the contest director since the death of Carmel Santiago. Hauersperger operated the pageant until his retirement in 1999. Paul Lopez (Mr. Gay All-American 2000) operated the contest from 1999 to 2003, when Richard Greer (Mr. Gay All-American 1999) assumed the directorial role. John Beebe (Mr. Gay All-American 1996) succeeded Greer as director. In 2009, Beebe and Hauersperger announced that the Mr. Gay All-American Contest system would cease operations indefinitely.

Mr. Gay All-American Titleholders
| Year | Titleholder |
|---|---|
| 1983, 1984 | Ron East |
| 1985 | Keith Mitchell |
| 1986 | Ered Matthew |
| 1987 | Medwin Johnson |
| 1988 | Brad Bemis |
| 1989 | Patrick Boyd |
| 1990 | Milo Masters |
| 1991 | TJ McKay |
| 1992 | John Michael Gordon |
| 1993 | EJ White |
| 1994 | David Pace |
| 1995 | John Reny |
| 1996 | John Martin Beebe |
| 1997 | Jonathan George |
| 1998 | Antonio Edwards |
| 1999 | Richard Greer |
| 2000 | Kristian Martinez |
| 2001 | Paul Lopez |
| 2002 | Ryan Davis |
| 2003 | Enrique Perez |
| 2004 | Dave Morgan |
| 2005 | Lucas Lander |
| 2006 | John Lucas |
| 2007 | Taz Bailey |
| 2008 | Sebastian Armonte |
| 2009 | Rasean Montrese |

=== Mr. Gay America ===
In January 2017, Mad Angel Entertainment announced the return of Mr. Gay All-American as Mr. Gay America. Mr. Gay America operated for three years under Mad Angel Entertainment before being sold following the COVID-19 pandemic in 2020 to Prideland Productions who operated it until 2024.

Mr. Gay America Titleholders
| Year | Titleholder |
|---|---|
| 2017 | Kyle Ean |
| 2018 | Judas Elliot |
| 2019 | Simba R. Hall |
| 2021 | Christopher Iman |
| 2022 | KC Sunshine |
| 2023 | Geo Johnson |
| 2024 | Kristofer Inez Onyx |

=== Gay America Esquire ===
In April 2025, Mad Angel Entertainment in association with KC Sunshine Entertainment (led by Mr. Gay America 2022 KC Sunshine) debuted the Gay America Esquire division. This division would take the place of Mr. Gay America. Mr. Gay America 2024 Kristofer Inez Onyx assumed the inaugural title of Gay America Esquire 2025.

Gay America Esquire Titleholders
| Year | Titleholder |
|---|---|
| 2025 | Kristofer Inez Onyx |
| 2026 | JaredLance |

=== Miss Gay America Femme ===
Held for the first time in 2025, Miss Gay America Femme is described as "Inspired by the esteemed Miss Gay America pageant". The event embraces the spirit of diversity and empowerment while specifically welcoming cis and trans women to showcase their unique journeys and stories.

Miss Gay America Femme Titleholders
| Year | Titleholder |
|---|---|
| 2025 | Naomi St. James |
| 2026 | Anya Marino |

== In film ==
The 2008 documentary film Pageant presents a behind-the-scenes look at the 34th Miss Gay America pageant and some of the competitors, many of whom have since won the title of Miss Gay America.

In 1982, Elizabeth Gracen, Miss America 1982, made her directorial debut with a documentary feature called The Damn Deal. The film is an intimate portrait of three female impersonators participating in the events surrounding the Miss Gay Little Rock Arkansas America pageant.

== See also ==
- Miss Gay Philippines
- Miss International Queen
- Miss Tiffany's Universe
