= Ron Davis (filmmaker) =

American filmmaker

- Occupations: Documentary director, writer, and producer
- Known for: Founding Docutainment Films
- Spouse: Luis Rodriguez (m. 2017)

Ron Davis is an American documentary film director, writer and producer. He is the founder of Docutainment Films.

== Early life and career ==
Davis founded Docutainment Films in Wellington, Florida to produce his documentaries. Davis married Luis Rodriguez in 2017.

== Pageant ==
In 2008 Davis released his directorial debut Pageant, which featured the 2005 Miss Gay America female impersonator pageant. He co-wrote, co-produced and co-directed the feature-length documentary that followed five drag queens as they competed for the title. During its showings at film festivals the movie became "critically acclaimed", and was awarded festival prizes. Pageant received its television broadcast debut on the Sundance Channel after winning a total of ten awards from film festivals. Davis became a full-time documentary maker in 2010, two years after the release of Pageant.

== Miss You Can Do It ==
In 2013, Davis released his second directorial effort Miss You Can Do It, an original HBO documentary. The film featured Abbey Curran, who became Miss Iowa USA in 2008 and the first woman with a disability to compete in the Miss USA Pageant. Miss You Can Do It follows Curran as well as eight young women from around the US with special needs as they participate in the 2008 Miss You Can Do It Pageant in Kewanee, Illinois. The film debuted at the Palm Beach International Film Festival Friday on April 5, 2013 and received its first television broadcast in June 2013.

== Harry & Snowman ==
In 2015, Davis premiered his third feature documentary, Harry & Snowman, at the Full Frame Documentary Film Festival. Snowman was an old Amish plow horse that Dutch immigrant Harry deLeyer rescued off a truck that was bound for the meat and glue factory for only $80. Less than two years after he rescued Snowman, they rose to become the national show jumping champions and were the Cinderella story and media darlings of late 1950s and 1960s.

The film won ten film festival awards, including the 2015 Nantucket Film Festival Audience Award for Best Documentary, the Woods Hole Film Festival, Best of the Fest Audience Award, the New Orleans Film Festival Audience Award for Best Documentary and the Prescott Film Festival Audience Award for Best Documentary. Harry & Snowman was released theatrically on September 30, 2016 by FilmRise. and went on to become one of the top grossing theatrical documentaries of 2016. The film was a NYT Critics' Pick, and the Los Angeles Times praised the film as "captivating".

== Life In The Doghouse ==
In 2019 June, Netflix released Davis’ Life In the Doghouse, a documentary that follows a couple, Danny Robertshaw and Ron Danta, running the Danny & Ron's Rescue from their own home, ever since Hurricane Katrina made catastrophic landfall in the United States’ Gulf Coast in August 2005. With thirteen years operating the business and 10,000 dogs rescued, the documentary aimed to inspire viewers to do the same.

The film won Best Documentary at the Tryon International Film Festival and Audience Award at The Rochester LGBT Film Festival. The documentary was also the Official Selection at the Frameline San Francisco International LGBT Film Festival, Provincetown Film Festival, and Newport Film.
