= Drag pageantry =

Beauty pageants for female impersonators, drag performers and trans women

Drag pageantry is a form of pageantry for female impersonators, drag queens, and trans women, styled after traditional beauty pageants or contests for cisgender women. It has also evolved into a pageantry for male impersonators, drag kings and trans men.

== National pageants in the United States ==
National drag pageants became enmeshed within the gay community during the 1960s with a national circuit of pageants organized by Flawless Sabrina and have become increasingly prevalent since. Drag pageants were held in individual gay bars, and discothèques during the post Stonewall era. Drag pageants evolved independently, in the decade subsequent to the first gay Mardi Gras coronations.

=== Miss Gay America ===
Mirroring the format of the Miss America contest, the first national gay pageant Miss Gay America (MGA) was held in 1972 at the Watch Your Hat & Coat Saloon in Nashville, Tennessee, Nashville's first gay dance and show bar. Jerry Peek opened this bar in 1971, and it was an instant sensation, not only with gay patrons, but also with the straight crowd. Norma Kristie, state representative of Arkansas, was crowned as the winner of the 1973 Miss Gay America Pageant, and in 1975 Norman "Norma Kristie" Jones took ownership of the pageant from Jerry Peek, who founded the Miss Gay America Pageant. Norman Jones would form Norma Kristie, Inc. and operate the pageant and its network of preliminaries for the next 30 years.

=== Miss Continental ===
As Miss Gay America grew in popularity and prestige, many professional female impersonators who lived full-time as women found they were unable to compete in the pageant due to its longstanding rule barring transgender contestants. Aside from the prestige of holding a national title, MGA afforded its winner guaranteed show bookings at every state preliminary held during the title year; thus, the MGA crown turned what was often local, part-time work into a full-time job. Because many trans women also use drag shows as a source of income, it was only natural that a pageantry system would evolve to meet their needs.

In 1980, Chicago nightclub promoter Jim Flint, owner of the Baton Show Lounge, filled this void with the creation of the Miss Continental U.S.A. Pageant. A number of notable winners either were "boy queens" at the time that they won or have never pursued gender transition—including Chilli Pepper, the first Miss Continental, Michelle Dupree, Miss Continental 1998, Naysha Lopez, Miss Continental, 2013 and Brooke Lynn Hytes, Miss Continental 2014–15—but over time the Continental Pageantry System became renowned for its "titty girls," or pre-/non-operative transsexual contestants. On January 7, 2019, Jim Flint released a statement that Continental would be the second pageant out of the top 5 to allow post-operative contestant to compete in its pageants, the only other National System that allowed that until this time was All American Goddess.

== See also ==
- Ball culture
- Cross-dressing ball
- Drag (clothing)
- Drag queens
- Drag kings
- Faux queen
- List of transgender-related topics
- List of drag queens
- RuPaul's Drag Race, a reality show with a similar premise
