= Living Proof (Sylvester album) =

Live album by Sylvester
- Released: 1979
- Recorded: March 11, 1979
- Venue: War Memorial Opera House, San Francisco, California
- Genre: Disco, pop
- Label: Fantasy
- Producer: Harvey Fuqua, Sylvester

Sylvester chronology
Stars (1979)	Living Proof (1979)	Sell My Soul (1980)

Professional ratings
Review scores
Source	Rating
AllMusic	4.5/5 stars
Christgau's Record Guide	B−
Record Mirror	2/5 stars

Living Proof is an album by American singer Sylvester, released in 1979 on the Fantasy label. Living Proof was a double-record set featuring three sides of live material recorded at War Memorial Opera House in San Francisco, California. The fourth side of the album included three new studio recordings.

== Commercial performance ==
The album peaked at No. 45 on the R&B albums chart. It also reached No. 123 on the Billboard 200. The album features the singles "Can't Stop Dancing", which peaked at No. 43 on the Hot Soul Singles chart, and a cover version of Patti LaBelle's "You Are My Friend", which charted at No. 30 on the Hot Soul Singles chart. "Can't Stop Dancing", along with the track "In My Fantasy (I Want You, I Need You)", both reached No. 2 on the Hot Dance Club Play chart.

== Track listing ==
Side one
No.	Title	Writer(s)	Length
1.	"Overture" ("Grateful" / "You Make Me Feel (Mighty Real)" / "Dance (Disco Heat)")	Michael Finden, Sylvester / Sylvester, James "Tip" Wirrick / Eric Robinson, Victor Orsborn	3:25
2.	"Body Strong"	Michael Finden, Sylvester	3:21
3.	"Blackbird"	John Lennon, Paul McCartney	4:52
4.	"Medley" ("Could It Be Magic" / "A Song for You")	Barry Manilow, Adrienne Anderson / Leon Russell	5:58
5.	"Happiness"	Allen Toussaint	5:59

Side two
No.	Title	Writer(s)	Length
6.	"Lover Man (Oh Where Can You Be)"	Jimmy Davis, James Sherman, Ram Ramirez	6:10
7.	"Sharing Something Perfect Between Ourselves"	Harold Johnson, Andrew Porter	6:57
8.	"You Are My Friend"	Patti LaBelle, James Ellison, Armstead Edwards	8:16

Side three
No.	Title	Writer(s)	Length
9.	"Dance (Disco Heat)"	Eric Robinson, Victor Orsborn	11:09
10.	"You Make Me Feel (Mighty Real)"	Sylvester, James "Tip" Wirrick	10:38

Side four
No.	Title	Writer(s)	Length
11.	"Can't Stop Dancing"	Sylvester	6:22
12.	"In My Fantasy (I Want You, I Need You)"	Sylvester	6:30
13.	"Can't Stop Dancing (Reprise)"	Sylvester	2:56

== Personnel ==
- Sylvester - lead vocal
- Martha Wash - backing vocal
- Izora Rhodes - backing vocal
- Jeanie Tracey - backing vocal
- Patrick Cowley - synthesizers and sequencer
- James "Tip" Wirrick - electric guitar
- Eric Robinson, Michael Finden - electric piano, organ and clavinet
- Bob Kingson - bass
- Kelvin Dixon - drums
- David Frazier, Richard Kvistad, Gus Anthony Flores - percussions
- Jay Stolmac, Marc Baum - saxophone and flute
- Dan Reagan - trombone
- Ross Wilson - trombone and trumpet
- Dean Boysen - trumpet
- Randall Pratt - harp

== Charts ==
Album

Chart (1979)	Peaks
U.S. Billboard Top LPs	123
U.S. Billboard Top Soul LPs	45

Singles

Year	Single	Peaks	
Year	Single	US R&B	US Dan
1979	"Can't Stop Dancing"	43	2
1979	"In My Fantasy (I Want You, I Need You)"	—	2
1980	"You Are My Friend"	30	—
