= Izora Armstead =

American singer (1942–2004)

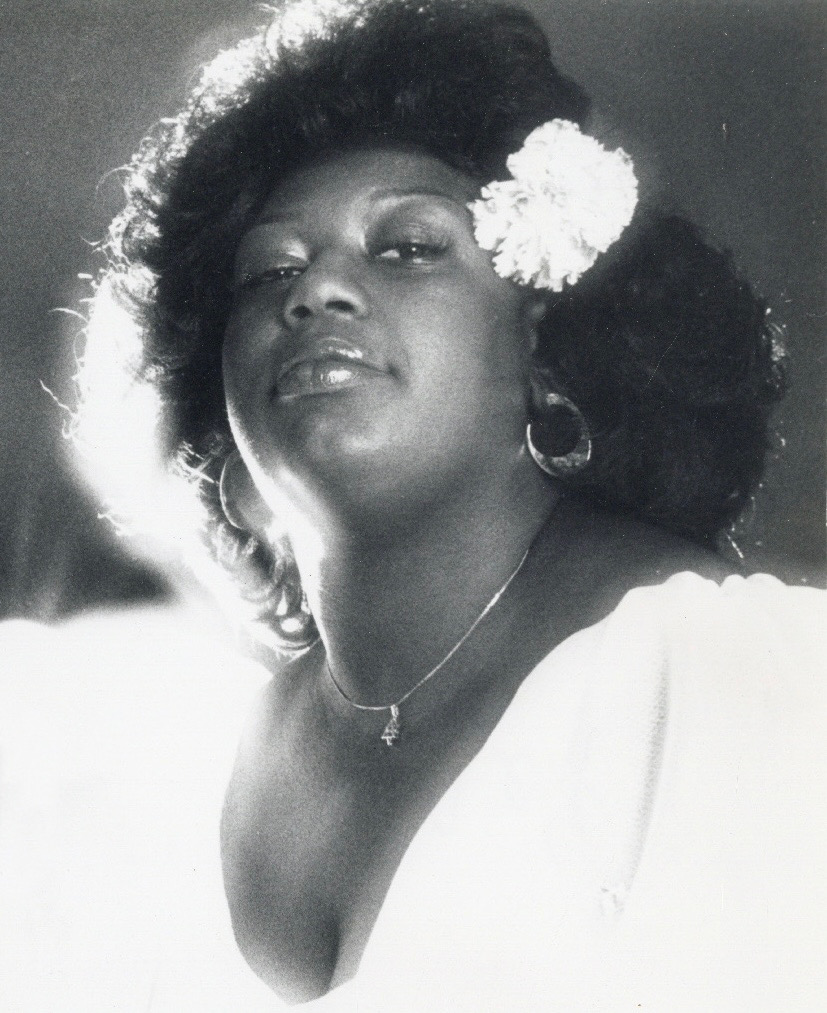
- Armstead c. 1980

Background information
- Also known as: Izora Redman
- Born: Izora M. Rhodes; July 6, 1942; Houston, Texas, U.S.
- Died: September 16, 2004 (aged 62) San Leandro, California, U.S.
- Genres: Disco; house; R&B; post disco; soul
- Occupation: Singer
- Instruments: Vocals; piano
- Years active: 1975–2004
- Labels: eastwest, Columbia

Izora Margaret Rhodes-Armstead (July 6, 1942 – September 16, 2004) was an American singer. Known for her distinctive alto voice, Armstead first achieved success as one half of the duo Two Tons O' Fun, with Martha Wash, as they sang backup for American disco singer Sylvester. The duo obtained their own record deal as Two Tons O'Fun in 1979. They released three consecutive songs that were hits on the Dance Chart. The duo was renamed The Weather Girls in 1982 after the release of their single "It's Raining Men", their most successful single. As a duo, The Weather Girls released five albums and were featured on Sylvester's albums.

After The Weather Girls disbanded in 1988, Armstead released the single "Don't Let Love Slip Away" (1991). In 1991, she reformed The Weather Girls with her daughter Dynelle Rhodes, who had been one of the duo's background singers. Over the course of a decade, they released three albums: Double Tons of Fun (1993), Think Big! (1995), and Puttin' On The Hits (1999).

On September 16, 2004, Armstead died from heart failure in San Leandro, California.

== Early life ==
Izora M. Rhodes was born on July 6, 1942 in Houston, Texas. She moved to San Francisco with her family when she was a child. At the young age of 4, she began playing piano and later began singing at age 8. Rhodes eventually became the lead vocalist and pianist of San Francisco Inspirational Choir. Rhodes studied classical music at San Francisco Conservatory. She modeled herself after her favorite singers Mahalia Jackson and Clara Ward.

By 1975, Rhodes had a total of seven children, six boys and a girl, that she raised as a single parent. To support her children, Rhodes worked as a bartender and a nurse assistant. In addition, Rhodes worked as a piano and vocal teacher. In 1976, Rhodes married a new husband and changed her last name to Armstead. According to the autobiography book The Fabulous Sylvester: The Legend, the Music, the Seventies in San Francisco written by Joshua Gamson, she had a total of eleven children (four of which are allegedly step-children) with then-new husband [Armstead]. Now Izora Armstead, she eventually landed in a short-lived gospel group named N.O.W. (News of the World), which included neighborhood friend Martha Wash.

== Career ==
=== 1976–1981: Sylvester and Two Tons O' Fun ===
In February 1976, Wash auditioned as a backup singer before American singer-songwriter Sylvester and his manager Brent Thomson. Impressed with her vocal performance, Sylvester inquired if she had another large black friend who could sing, after which she introduced him to Izora Rhodes. Although he referred to them simply as "the girls", Wash and Rhodes formed a musical duo named Two Tons O' Fun (sometimes referred to as "The Two Tons"). Two Tons O' Fun debuted as Sylvester's backing vocalists on his self-titled third album Sylvester, released in 1977. The duo sang backup vocals on the album's singles "Down, Down, Down" and "Over and Over", which charted at number 18 on the Billboard Dance chart. In 1978, Sylvester released his fourth album Step II, which featured The Two Tons' background vocals throughout the album. "Dance (Disco Heat)", the album's lead single which featured The Tons, peaked at number one on Billboard Dance chart and became their first number-one single on that chart. In 1979, Two Tons O' Fun sang background on Sylvester's live album Living Proof. Later that year, the duo secured their own record deal with Fantasy Records.

On January 24, 1980, the duo released their debut self-titled album Two Tons of Fun. The album spawned two top-five dance singles: "Earth Can Be Just Like Heaven" and "I Got the Feeling". Their second album Backatcha was released later that year. The album spawned a single "I Depend on You" that peaked at number 72 on the Dance chart.

=== 1982–1988: The Weather Girls ===
In September 1982, the duo released their single "It's Raining Men". The song became their biggest hit, peaking at number one on the Dance chart and number forty-six on Billboard's Hot 100 chart. Following the success of the song, Two Tons o Fun changed their group name to The Weather Girls. On January 22, 1983, they released their third album Success. The album's titled-track "Success" was released as the second single and peaked at number eighty-nine on the R&B chart. In 1985, The Weather Girls released their fourth album Big Girls Don't Cry. In 1988, The Weather Girls released their self-titled fifth album The Weather Girls, the final album featuring Armstead and Wash. Shortly after the release of the album, The Weather Girls were dropped from Columbia and soon disbanded to pursue solo careers.

=== 1989–1991: Solo career ===
Following the disbandment of The Weather Girls, Armstead pursued a brief solo career. She began touring as a solo artist, performing songs from The Weather Girls. In 1991, she released a single "Don't Let Love Slip Away".

=== 1991–2004: Reformation of The Weather Girls ===
After a three-year hiatus and Wash pursuing her solo career, Armstead reformed The Weather Girls with her daughter Dynelle Rhodes and relocated to Germany in 1991. Their first album together, titled Double Tons of Fun, was released in 1993. The album's lead single "Can You Feel It" peaked at number two Billboard's Dance chart. The song peaked at number 75 on Germany's music chart, their second single to enter that chart since "It's Raining Men". While touring the club circuit, the album's third single "We Shall All Be Free" peaked at number 80 on Germany's music chart. Their follow-up album Think Big! was released in December 1995. The album saw Armstead's contribution as a songwriter and penning several songs, including the album's third single "The Sound of Sex (Ooh Gitchie O-La-La-Ay)" which was written with her daughter. The album contained a cover version of Sylvester's 1979 disco hit "Stars", recorded as a duet with Scottish pop singer Jimmy Somerville.

In 1999, The Weather Girls released their eighth studio album Puttin' on the Hits which contained a collection of covered disco songs. In 2002, they joined the Disco Brothers for a participation in the German National Final for the Eurovision Song Contest, with their song "Get Up". Overall, the group finished in 13th place.

== Final years and death ==
Armstead's final recording was the single "Big Brown Girl" with The Weather Girls, released in 2004. In August 2004, Armstead returned to the Bay Area to undergo treatment for heart-related problems. In mid-September 2004, Armstead was checked into San Leandro Hospital after her condition deteriorated. On September 16, 2004, Armstead died from heart failure at the age of 62 in 2004 in San Leandro, California. She was survived by her seven children. Her funeral was held at St. John Missionary Baptist Church in San Francisco, California. She was laid to rest in Cypress Lawn Memorial Park in Colma, California.

== Legacy ==
As of 2004, Armstead's voice has collectively accumulated a total of three number-one dance singles: "Dance (Disco Heat)" (1978) and "You Make Me Feel (Mighty Real)" (1978) with Sylvester; and "It's Raining Men" with The Weather Girls. Her single "It's Raining Men" was ranked the song at 35 on VH1's list of the 100 Greatest Dance Songs in 2000, and at 35 in their 100 Greatest One-Hit Wonders of the 1980s in 2009. Armstead's daughter Dynelle Rhodes received the rights to The Weather Girls name. Rhodes added a then-new member Ingrid Arthur to The Weather Girls and began performing as a tribute to Armstead. The Weather Girls' album Totally Wild! (2005) was dedicated to Armstead. In 2012, Rhodes replaced Ingrid Arthur with Dorrey Lin Lyles.

On September 14, 2014, Mighty Real: A Fabulous Sylvester Musical, a Broadway musical about Sylvester, debuted in New York City. Armstead's likeness was featured in the production and she was portrayed by actress Anastacia McCleskey.

== Discography ==
Singles

- 1991: "Don't Let Love Slip Away"
- 1991: "Let's Get Busy"
