= Stars (Sylvester album) =

Studio album by Sylvester
- Released: 1979
- Studios: Fantasy (Berkeley, California); Island (London, England)
- Genres: Disco; pop
- Length: 33:34
- Label: Fantasy
- Producers: Harvey Fuqua; Sylvester

Sylvester chronology
Step II (1978)	Stars (1979)	Living Proof (1979)

Professional ratings
Review scores
Source	Rating
AllMusic	3/5 stars
Christgau's Record Guide	B+
The Virgin Encyclopedia of R&B and Soul	3/5 stars

Stars is the fifth studio album by American singer Sylvester, released in 1979 on the Fantasy label.

== Chart performance ==
The album peaked at No. 27 on the R&B albums chart. It also reached No. 63 on the Billboard 200. The album features a disco-styled cover version of Ben E. King's "I (Who Have Nothing)", which peaked at No. 27 on the Hot Soul Singles chart and No. 40 on the Billboard Hot 100. It also reached No. 4 on the Hot Dance Club Play chart along with the title track and "Body Strong".

== Track listing ==
Side one
No.	Title	Writer(s)	Length
1.	"Stars"	Patrick Cowley	8:06
2.	"Body Strong"	Michael Finden, Sylvester	8:10

Side two
No.	Title	Writer(s)	Length
3.	"I (Who Have Nothing)"	Jerry Leiber, Mike Stoller	10:40
4.	"I Need Somebody to Love Tonight"	Cowley	6:38
Total length:			33:34

== Charts ==
Album

Chart (1979)	Peak position
US Billboard Top LPs	63
US Billboard Top Soul LPs	27

Singles

Year	Title	Peaks		
Year	Title	US	US R&B	US Dan
1979	"I (Who Have Nothing)"	40	27	4
1979	"Stars"	—	—	4
1979	"Body Strong"	—	—	4
