= I (Who Have Nothing) =

English language cover of Italian song (1963)

"Uno dei tanti"

Song
- Songwriters: Giulio "Mogol" Rapetti (lyrics); Carlo Donida (music)

"I (Who Have Nothing)" (sometimes billed as "I Who Have Nothing") is an English-language cover of the Italian song "Uno dei tanti" (English: "One of Many"), with music by Carlo Donida and lyrics by Giulio "Mogol" Rapetti. The original version, "Uno dei Tanti", was performed by Joe Sentieri in 1961. The song was first recorded in English, with new lyrics from Jerry Leiber and Mike Stoller, and performed by Ben E. King in 1963. King's 2001 re-recording of the song was selected for The Sopranos' Peppers & Eggs soundtrack CD.

Other successful cover versions were released by Shirley Bassey, Tom Jones, and Sylvester.

== Ben E. King version ==
"I (Who Have Nothing)"

Single by Ben E. King

from the album Young Boy Blues
- B-side: "The Beginning of Time"
- Released: June 1963
- Genre: Soul
- Length: 2:30
- Label: Atco
- Songwriters: Carlo Donida, Mogol, Jerry Leiber and Mike Stoller
- Producers: Jerry Leiber & Mike Stoller

Ben E. King singles chronology
"How Can I Forget" (1963)	"I (Who Have Nothing)" (1963)	"I Could Have Danced All Night" (1963)

The English lyrics for "I (Who Have Nothing)" were written by Jerry Leiber. The title is a translation of a line in the Italian lyrics "Io, che non ho niente", but otherwise the English lyrics were written afresh by the lyricists. Leiber and Stoller also produced the first English language release, performed by Ben E. King in 1963. Leiber and Stoller previously had co-written and produced the song "Stand by Me" with Ben E. King in 1961. The record used the same arrangement from Joe Sentieri's record (orchestra conducted by Luis Enriquez Bacalov).

In the US, the Ben E. King version reached No. 29 on the Billboard Hot 100 charts and No. 16 on the Hot R&B Singles chart.

=== Charts ===
Chart (1963)	Peak position
Australia (Music Maker)	8
US Billboard Hot 100	29
US Middle-Road Singles (Billboard)	10
US Hot R&B Singles (Billboard)	16

== Shirley Bassey version ==
"I (Who Have Nothing)"

Single by Shirley Bassey
- B-side: "How Can You Tell?"
- Released: September 1963
- Genre: Pop
- Length: 2:38
- Label: Columbia
- Songwriters: Carlo Donida, Mogol, Jerry Leiber and Mike Stoller
- Producer: George Martin

Shirley Bassey recorded the song with producer George Martin as the song by Ben E. King was rising in the chart in the US, and released the song in the UK in September 1963. Her version reached No. 6 on UK charts. Bassey has performed the song at almost every live concert she gave, and it is included in many of her compilation albums, such as a version in I Am What I Am recorded with the London Symphony Orchestra, and a version in Spanish ("Hoy No Tengo Nada") in her 1989 album La Mujer. She has also performed with the song's composer Donida who conducted his own music on Italian television.

=== Charts ===
Chart (1963)	Peak position
Australia (Music Maker)	4
New Zealand (Lever Hit Parade)	6
Ireland (IRMA)	10
UK Singles (Official Charts)	6

== Tom Jones version ==
Tom Jones recorded a version which was released in 1970. The song is the title track of his album I Who Have Nothing. This became the most popular version of the song in the United States, peaking at No. 14 in 1970 on the Billboard Hot 100, No. 2 on the Easy Listening chart, and No. 10 in Canada. This version also peaked at No. 11 in Cashbox.

=== Charts ===
Chart (1970)	Peak position
Belgium (Ultratop 50 Flanders)	6
Belgium (Ultratop 50 Wallonia)	21
Canada Top Singles (RPM)	10
UK Singles (Official Charts)	16
US Billboard Hot 100	14
US Adult Contemporary (Billboard)	2

== Sylvester version ==
"I (Who Have Nothing)"

Single by Sylvester

from the album Stars
- B-side: "I Need Somebody to Love Tonight"
- Released: March 1979
- Recorded: 1979
- Genre: Soul, Disco
- Length: 3:59
- Label: Fantasy
- Songwriters: Carlo Donida, Mogol, Jerry Leiber and Mike Stoller
- Producers: Sylvester, Harvey Fuqua

Sylvester singles chronology
"You Make Me Feel (Mighty Real)" (1978)	"I (Who Have Nothing)" (1979)	"Stars" (1979)

Sylvester recorded a disco version in 1979. The orchestral arrangement for the song was recorded at Island Records' Basing Street Studios. This version reached No. 40 in US and No. 86 Canada.

=== Charts ===
Chart (1979)	Peak position
Canada Top Singles (RPM)	86
Ireland (IRMA)	23
UK Singles (Official Charts)	46
US Billboard Hot 100	40

== Other versions ==
Other versions which reached the Billboard charts were performed by Terry Knight and the Pack in 1966 (No. 46 US, No. 36 Canada), Liquid Smoke in 1970 (No. 82 US, No. 66 Canada), and Warhorse in 1972. The song was also recorded in Australia by Normie Rowe (1965), the Easybeats, the Dave Bridge Trio (1966) and Rob E. G. (1964/65), and in New Zealand by Shane.

British rock band the Spectres, later known as Status Quo, released their version of the song produced by John Schroeder in September 1966 as a single on Piccadilly Records. This was their debut single, nearly a year before changing their name and finding their way to mainstream popularity. The single, however, failed to chart.

Swedish pop group Tom & Mick & Maniacs recorded the song sporadically between 5–7 and 15 October 1967 at Europafilm Studio in Bromma, Stockholm together with producer Anders Henriksson. In December of that year, it was released on their album Tom & Mick Maniacs, and in February 1968, it was extracted as a single on Columbia Records, backed by "Pandemonium", an original composition. It reached No. 8 on Tio i Topp, becoming their final chart hit. Neil Diamond covered the song which was included on the album Up on the Roof: Songs from the Brill Building, released in 1993 on Columbia Records. No-wave band James Chance & the Contortions recorded it for their 2016 album The Flesh Is Weak (2016). It was also recorded by the Righteous Brothers (1967), Leslie Uggams (1967), Little Milton (1968), Roberta Flack & Donny Hathaway (1972), Cockney Rebel (1974), Brian May & Kerry Elli, and Luther Vandross (1991).
