= The Weather Girls =

American female musical duo

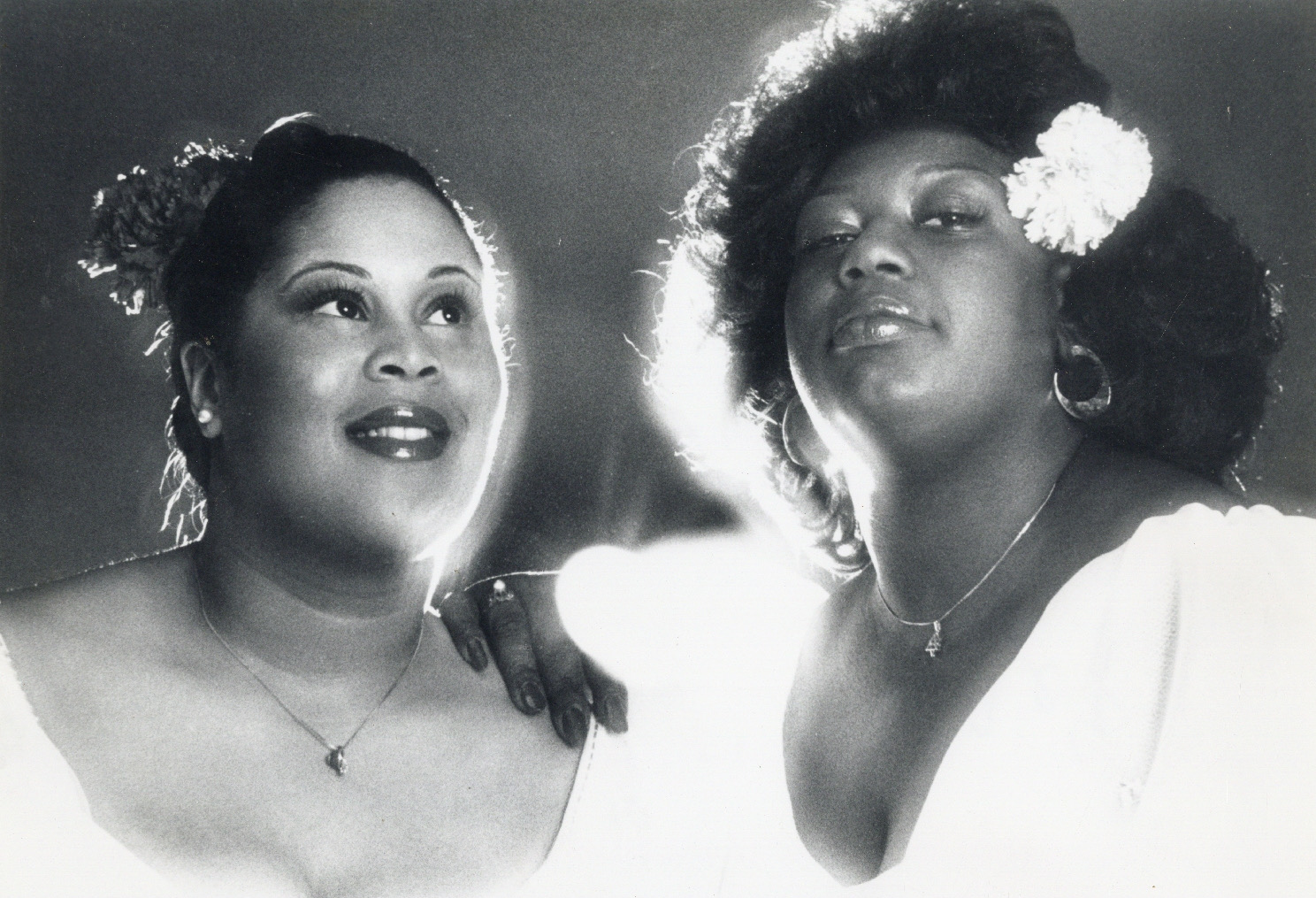
- Martha Wash (left) and Izora Armstead, c. 1980

Background information
- Also known as: Two Tons O' Fun; The Two Tons
- Origin: San Francisco, California, U.S.
- Genres: Hi-NRG; disco; pop; soul
- Years active: 1976–1988; 1991–present
- Labels: Columbia; Fantasy; Carrillo Music
- Members: Dynelle Rhodes; Dorrey Lin Lyles; Darnita Williams; Dawn Tallman
- Past members: Martha Wash; Izora Armstead; Ingrid Arthur

The Weather Girls are an American female duo whose best-known line-up comprised Martha Wash and Izora Armstead. Formed in 1976 in San Francisco, California, Wash and Armstead began their musical careers as Two Tons O' Fun, the female backup duo for disco singer Sylvester. After several years of singing background for Sylvester, the duo was signed in 1979 to Fantasy Records as Two Tons O' Fun. The duo changed their name to The Weather Girls and were launched into somewhat more mainstream recognition following the release of the single, "It's Raining Men" (1982), which became their first number-one song on the US Dance Chart and their biggest hit. Despite having several hit songs on the Dance Chart as Two Tons O' Fun and The Weather Girls, the duo never achieved a top 40 hit on the main US Hot 100 and ultimately disbanded in 1988 after the release of their self-titled fifth album The Weather Girls.

In 1991, Armstead reformed the duo with her daughter Dynelle Rhodes. Over the course of a decade, Armstead and Rhodes released three albums: Double Tons of Fun (1993), Think Big!, and Puttin' On the Hits (1999). In 2004, Armstead died due to heart failure and was replaced with singer Ingrid Arthur. Following the release of two albums Totally Wild! (2004) and The Woman I Am (2009), Arthur left the group and was replaced with singer Dorrey Lin Lyles in 2012. In 2025, Darnita Williams and Dawn Tallman began alternating as vocalist alongside Dynelle Rhodes.

As the Weather Girls with Martha Wash and Izora Armstead, the duo received a Grammy Award nomination for Best R&B Performance by a Duo or Group with Vocal in 1984.

== History ==
=== 1970–1975: Formation and early years ===
Izora Rhodes and Martha Wash met at a young age. Wash attended Church of God in Christ, which was an alley away from the Baptist church Rhodes was attending. Rhodes was the lead vocalist and pianist of the San Francisco Inspirational Choir. Wash and Rhodes eventually landed in a gospel group called N.O.W. (News of the World). While performing part-time in the group, Wash worked as a secretary for UC Hospital while Rhodes worked as a bartender and a nurse assistant. Rhodes also worked as a piano and vocal teacher.

=== 1976–1979: Sylvester and the Two Tons o' Fun ===
In February 1976, Wash auditioned as a backup singer before American singer-songwriter Sylvester and his manager Brent Thomson. Impressed with her vocal performance, Sylvester inquired if she had another large black friend who could sing, after which she introduced him to Izora Rhodes. Although he referred to them simply as "the girls", Wash and Rhodes formed a musical duo called Two Tons O' Fun. Two Tons O' Fun debuted as Sylvester's backing vocalists on his self-titled third album Sylvester, released in 1977. The duo sang backup vocals on the album's singles "Down, Down, Down" and "Over and Over"; the former charted at number eighteen on the Billboard Dance chart.

In 1978, Sylvester released his fourth album Step II, in which The Two Tons also contributed background vocals throughout the album. They performed backing vocals on the singles "Dance (Disco Heat)" and "You Make Me Feel (Mighty Real)" which both peaked at number one on Billboard's Dance chart. In 1979, the duo secured their own record deal with Fantasy Records. That same year, Two Tons O' Fun sang background on Sylvester's live album Living Proof, one of their final performances together. As they began to work on their own album, the duo appeared in fewer shows with Sylvester.

=== 1980–1981: Debut album and Backatcha ===
On January 24, 1980, the duo released their debut self-titled album Two Tons o' Fun. The album spawned two top-five dance singles: "Earth Can Be Just Like Heaven" and "I Got the Feeling". Shortly after the release of the album, they changed their name to The Two Tons after being informed that an Oklahoma gospel act had already registered the group name "Two Tons o Fun" with ASCAP since 1958. Their second album Backatcha was released later that year. The album spawned a single "I Depend On You" that peaked at number seventy-two on the Dance chart. The follow-up single "Never Like This" peaked at number fifty-five on the R&B chart.

=== 1982–1988: The Weather Girls and breakthrough ===
In September 1982, the duo released their single "It's Raining Men", and changed their duo title to The Weather Girls, a name chosen as a pun on the song's subject. The song became their biggest hit to date, peaking at number one on the Dance chart and number forty-six on Billboard's Hot 100 chart. The song also peaked at number two on the UK Singles Chart, and became certified Silver-status for sales exceeding 200,000 copies in the United Kingdom. "It's Raining Men" received a nomination at the 26th Annual Grammy Awards (1983) for Best R&B Performance By A Duo Or Group With Vocal. On January 22, 1983, they released their third album Success. Despite the overall success of the album's lead single, the album experienced mild success. The album's title-track "Success" was released as the second single and peaked at number eighty-nine on the R&B chart. Two additional singles, "I'm Gonna Wash That Man Right Outa My Hair" and "Dear Santa (Bring Me a Man This Christmas)", were also released but failed to chart.

In 1984, The Weather Girls performed backing vocals on the million-selling single "Centipede" by Rebbie Jackson. The song was written, arranged, and produced by Michael Jackson, who also sang background vocals on the song. It reached number 4 on the Black Singles Chart and was certified gold by the Recording Industry Association of America. In 1985, The Weather Girls released their fourth album Big Girls Don't Cry. The album's singles "Well-A-Wiggy" and "No One Can Love You More Than Me" experienced moderate success and had poor promotion. In 1988, The Weather Girls released their self-titled fifth album The Weather Girls, party produced by Full Force and Reggie Lucas, which was ultimately seen as a commercial failure by their record label. Shortly after the album, The Weather Girls disbanded and Wash took up a solo career and also began working as a session vocalist.

=== 1991–2003: Reformation ===
After a three-year hiatus and Wash pursuing her solo career, Armstead reformed The Weather Girls with her daughter Dynelle Rhodes and relocated to Germany in 1991. Their first album together Double Tons of Fun was released in 1993. The album's lead single "Can You Feel It" peaked at number two on Billboard's Dance chart. The song also peaked at number 75 on Germany's music chart, their second single to enter that chart since "It's Raining Men". While touring the club circuit, the album's third single "We Shall All Be Free" peaked at number 80 on Germany's music chart. Their follow-up album Think Big! was released in December 1995. The album saw Armstead's contribution as a songwriter and penning several songs, including the album's third single "The Sound of Sex (Ooh Gitchie O-La-La-Ay)", which was written with her daughter. The album also contained a cover version of Sylvester's 1979 disco hit "Stars", recorded as a duet with Scottish pop singer Jimmy Somerville.

In 1999, The Weather Girls released their eighth studio album Puttin' On The Hits, which contained a collection of covered disco songs. The non-album track "Big Brown Girl" was released as a single in 1999. In 2002, they joined the Disco Brothers for participation in the German National Final for the Eurovision Song Contest with their song "Get Up". In the end, the group only managed a 13th place out of 15.

=== 2004–2012: Lineup change ===
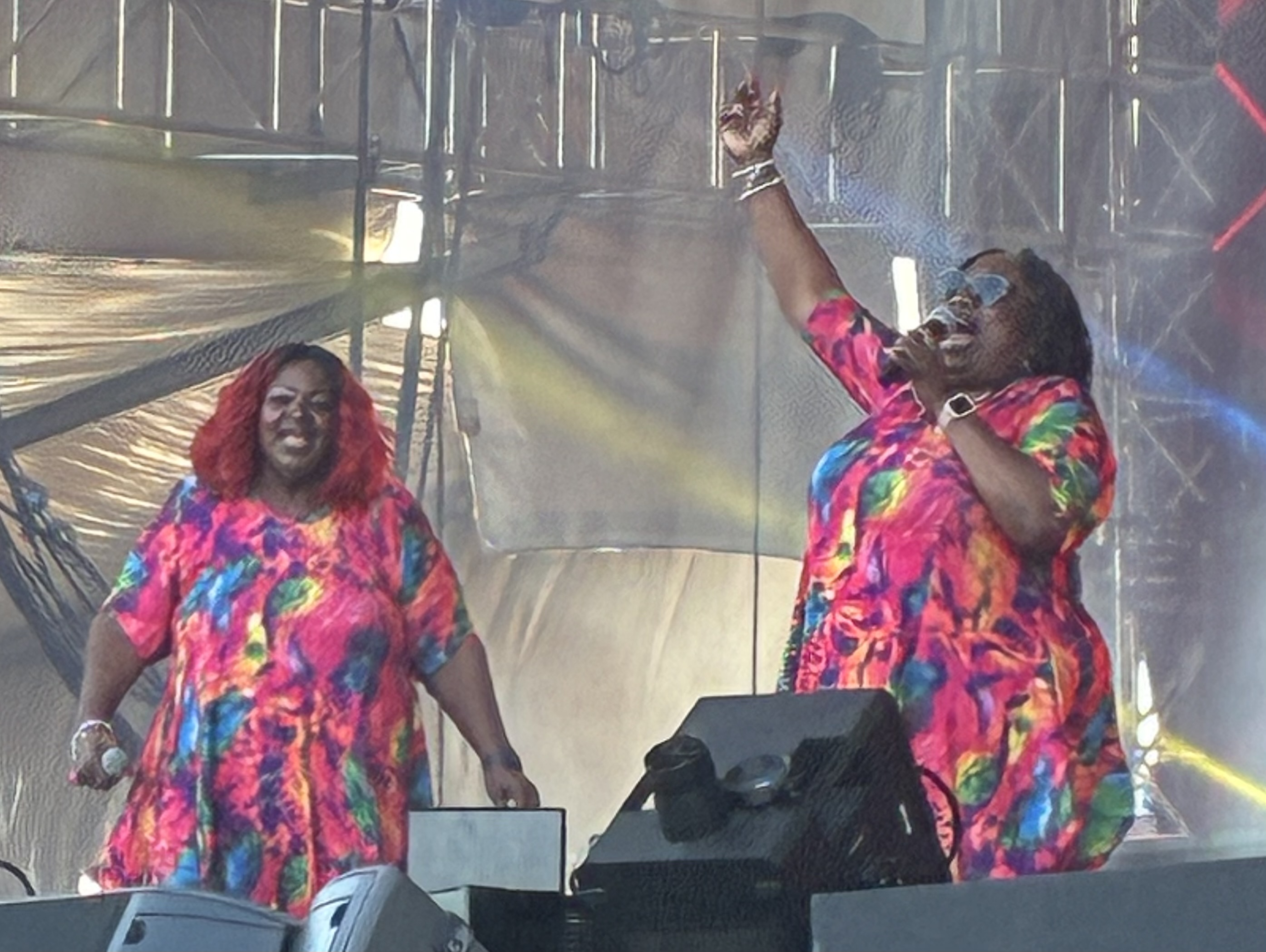
Dynelle Rhodes and Dorrey Lin Lyles at the Rainbow Festival in Cologne, 2025

On September 16, 2004, Izora Armstead died of heart failure at age 62. Prior to Armstead's passing, new member Ingrid Arthur joined The Weather Girls in 2004. Following Armstead's passing, they released the album Totally Wild which spawned the single "Wild Thang" in 2004. In 2006, Joan Faulkner began performing with Rhodes and often substituting for Arthur. In 2008, the Weather Girls released a single "Break You", which topped the Dance chart. In 2009, the duo released a new studio album titled The Woman I Am. In 2012, The Weather Girls released "It's Raining Men 2K12", a newly recorded version of their 1982 hit, produced by Sebo Reed. In the same year, Arthur departed from The Weather Girls to focus on her solo career. Dorrey Lin Lyles, a singer who had worked with the duo in the past, was added to the duo in mid-2012.

=== 2013–present: Recent activity ===
The Weather Girls began touring internationally in 2013. In 2018, they released a new single "We Need Love", produced by Torsten Abrolat, Terri B! and featuring, Jason Anousheh. In 2025, Darnita Williams and Dawn Tallman joined the lineup, as alternate singers in place of Dorrey Lin Lyles, performing alongside Rhodes.

== Legacy ==
Widely associated with their biggest song "It's Raining Men", VH1 ranked the song at thirty-five on their list of the 100 Greatest Dance Songs in 2000, and also at thirty-five in their 100 Greatest One-Hit Wonders of the 1980s in 2009. Paste Magazine ranked the song twelve in their list of The 60 Best Dancefloor Classics in February 2017.

"It's Raining Men" has often been perceived as a gay anthem. A campaign in Facebook was launched on January 19, 2014, to get the song to UK number one in response to a UKIP councillor blaming recent UK floods and adverse weather on divine retribution for the British government's introduction of gay marriage. The campaign was reported widely and The Weather Girls' version reached number 21 on the first day of the chart week. The song re-entered the UK Singles Chart in 2014 at number 31. In 2017, Rolling Stone included the song on their 25 Essential LGBTQ Pride Songs list. In 2018, Billboard ranked the song at number forty-seven on their The 50 Best Gay Anthems Of All Time list. The Gay UK ranked the song at number two on their Top 40 Gay Anthems for Pride list.

To date, The Weather Girls have accumulated an overall total of four number-one dance singles. Dynelle Rhodes holds the rights to the Weather Girls name and performs across Europe.

== Members ==
=== Current members ===
- Dynelle Rhodes – co–lead vocals (1991–present)
- Dorrey Lin Lyles – co–lead vocals (2012–present)

=== Touring members ===
- Joan Faulkner – co–lead vocals (2006–2020)
- Darnita Williams – co-lead vocals (2025–present)
- Dawn Tallman – co-lead vocals (2025–present)

=== Former members ===
- Martha Wash – co–lead vocals (1976–1988)
- Izora Armstead – co–lead vocals (1976–1988, 1991–2004)
- Ingrid Arthur – co–lead vocals (2004–2012)

== Discography ==
=== Albums ===
List of albums, with selected details and chart positions
Title	Album details	Peak chart positions	
Title	Album details	US	US R&B
Two Tons o' Fun	Released: January 24, 1980; Label: Fantasy; Formats: LP, cassette	91	28
Backatcha	Released: 1980; Label: Fantasy; Formats: LP, cassette	—	—
Success	Released: January 22, 1983; Label: Columbia, CBS; Formats: LP, cassette	—	—
Big Girls Don't Cry	Released: 1985; Label: Columbia, CBS; Formats: LP, CD, cassette	—	—
Weather Girls	Released: 1988; Label: Columbia, CBS; Formats: LP, CD, cassette	—	—
Double Tons of Fun	Released: 1993; Label: East West; Formats: CD, cassette	—	—
Think Big!	Released: November 24, 1995; Label: East West; Formats: CD, cassette	—	—
Puttin' on the Hits	Released: January 1, 1999; Label: East West; Formats: CD	—	—
Totally Wild	Released: August 30, 2005; Label: Coconut; Formats: CD	—	—
The Woman I Am	Released: January 13, 2009; Label: Coconut; Formats: CD	—	—
Carry On: The Deluxe Collection 1982–1992	Released: June 23, 2023; Label: SoulMusic; Formats: 4×CD	—	—

=== Singles ===
List of singles, with selected chart positions and certifications
Title	Year	Peak chart positions										Certifications	Album
Title	Year	US	US Dance	US R&B	AUS	GER	NL	NOR	NZ	SWI	UK	Certifications	Album
"Earth Can Be Just Like Heaven"	1980	—	2	—	—	—	—	—	—	—	—		Two Tons o' Fun
"I Got the Feeling"	1980	—	2	29	—	—	—	—	—	—	—		Two Tons o' Fun
"Just Us"	1980	—	—	52	—	—	—	—	—	—	—		Two Tons o' Fun
"Taking Away Your Space"	1980	—	—	53	—	—	—	—	—	—	—		Two Tons o' Fun
"I Depend on You"	1981	—	72	—	—	—	—	—	—	—	—		Backatcha
"Never Like This"	1981	—	—	55	—	—	—	—	—	—	—		Backatcha
"It's Raining Men"	1982	46	1	34	16	43	46	8	13	95	2	BPI: Platinum; BVMI: Gold; RMNZ: Platinum	Success
"Success"	1983	—	—	89	—	—	—	—	—	—	95		Success
"I'm Gonna Wash That Man Right Outta My Hair"	1983	—	—	—	—	—	—	—	—	—	—		Success
"Dear Santa (Bring Me a Man This Christmas)"	1983	—	—	—	—	—	—	—	—	—	—		Success
"Well-a-Wiggy"	1985	107	—	76	—	—	—	—	—	—	—		Big Girls Don't Cry
"No One Can Love You More Than Me"	1985	—	26	—	—	—	—	—	—	—	—		Big Girls Don't Cry
"Big Girls Don't Cry"	1985	—	—	—	—	—	—	—	—	—	—		Big Girls Don't Cry
"Love You Like a Train"	1988	—	—	—	—	—	—	—	—	—	—		The Weather Girls
"Land of the Believer"	1988	—	—	—	—	—	—	—	—	—	—		The Weather Girls
"Can You Feel It"	1993	—	2	—	—	75	—	—	—	—	—		Double Tons of Fun
"We're Gonna Party"	1993	—	—	—	—	—	—	—	—	—	—		Double Tons of Fun
"We Shall All Be Free"	1994	—	—	—	—	80	—	—	—	—	—		Double Tons of Fun
"Oh, What a Night"	1995	—	—	—	—	—	—	—	—	—	—		Think Big!
"Star" (featuring Jimmy Somerville)	1995	—	—	—	—	—	—	—	—	—	—		Think Big!
"The Sound of Sex (Ooh Gitchie O-La-La-Ay)"	1996	—	—	—	—	89	—	—	—	—	—		Think Big!
"Don't Look Any Further" (with Dennis Edwards)	1998	—	—	—	—	—	—	—	—	—	—		Puttin' On The Hits
"I'm So Excited"	1998	—	—	—	—	—	—	—	—	—	—		Puttin' On The Hits
"Get Up" (Disco Brothers featuring The Weather Girls)	2002	—	—	—	—	—	—	—	—	—	—		Non-album single
"Wild Thang"	2004	—	—	—	—	—	—	—	—	—	—		Totally Wild
"Break You" (Ralph Falcon featuring The Weather Girls)	2008	—	1	—	—	—	—	—	—	—	—		Non-album single
"We Need Love" (featuring Jason Anousheh)	2018	—	—	—	—	—	—	—	—	—	—		Non-album single
"Cheek to Cheek"	2019	—	32	—	—	—	—	—	—	—	—		Non-album single
"Stand Up"	2020	—	—	—	—	—	—	—	—	—	—		Non-album single
"Pride Strong"	2021	—	—	—	—	—	—	—	—	—	—		Non-album single
"Mad Love (A Song for Ukraine)"	2022	—	—	—	—	—	—	—	—	—	—		Non-album single
"Earth Can Be Just Like Heaven" (2026 version)	2026	—	—	—	—	—	—	—	—	—	—		Non-album single
"—" denotes a recording that did not chart or was not released in that territory.

=== Uncredited featured singles ===
List of singles, with selected chart positions and certifications
Title	Year	Peak chart positions						Certifications	Album
Title	Year	US	US Dance	US R&B	AUS	NZ	UK	Certifications	Album
"Dance (Disco Heat)"	1978	19	1	4	—	26	29		Step II
"Centipede"	1984	24	29	4	97	4	—	RIAA: Gold	Centipede
"—" denotes a recording that did not chart or was not released in that territory.

== See also ==
- List of number-one dance hits (United States)
- List of artists who reached number one on the US Dance chart
