= Martha Wash =

American singer (born 1953)

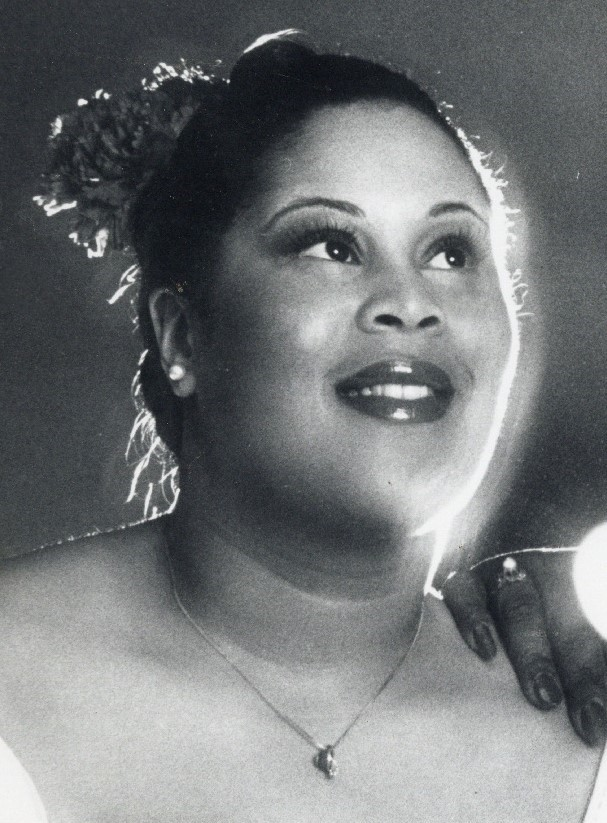
- Wash in c. 1980

Background information
- Born: Martha Elaine Wash; December 28, 1953 (age 72); San Francisco, California, U.S.
- Genres: R&B; house; disco; soul
- Occupations: Singer; songwriter; record producer; actress
- Instruments: Vocals; piano
- Years active: 1975–present
- Labels: Purple Rose; RCA
- Formerly of: The Weather Girls
- Website: marthawash.com

Martha Elaine Wash (born December 28, 1953) is an American singer and songwriter. Known for her distinctive and powerful voice, Wash first achieved fame as half of the Two Tons O' Fun, along with Izora Armstead, as they sang backing vocals for the disco singer Sylvester including on his signature hit "Dance (Disco Heat)". After gaining their own record deal, they released three consecutive commercially successful songs which all peaked at number two in the dance charts. The duo was renamed the Weather Girls in 1982 after they released the top-selling single "It's Raining Men", which brought them to mainstream pop attention. The duo released five albums and were heavily featured on Sylvester's albums.

After disbanding in 1988, Wash transitioned to house music as a featured artist on several successful songs. Her success on the Billboard dance chart has earned her the honorific title The Queen of Clubland, with a total of fifteen number-one songs on the chart to date.

Wash is also noted for sparking legislation in the early 1990s that made vocal credits mandatory on CDs and music videos. Starting in the late-1980s, her studio vocals were used in several successful dance songs without her permission or proper credit. Models lip-synched to her voice in music videos and during live performances, obscuring Wash's contributions and appearance. As a result, she was denied credit and royalties for many of the songs she recorded. This included the multi Platinum-selling song "Gonna Make You Sweat (Everybody Dance Now)" and the house anthem "Everybody Everybody". Subsequently, in Rolling Stone, music critic Jason Newman described Martha Wash as "The Most Famous Unknown Singer of the '90s". In December 2016, Billboard magazine ranked her as the 58th-most successful dance artist of all time.

== Early life ==
Wash attended in McKinley Elementary and graduated from San Francisco Polytechnic High School, where she sang in the school choir. During her time in high school, the school choir traveled and performed throughout Europe for two weeks. Wash also appeared on four albums in the school choir. Shortly after graduating high school, Wash joined a gospel group NOW (News of the World), which also included Izora Rhodes. Wash also worked as a secretary for UC Hospital.

== Career ==
=== 1976–1988: Two Tons O' Fun and the Weather Girls ===
In February 1976, Wash auditioned as a backup singer before a singer-songwriter Sylvester and his manager Brent Thomson. Impressed with her vocal performance, Sylvester inquired if she had another large black friend who could sing, after which she introduced him to Izora Rhodes. Although he referred to them simply as "the girls", Wash and Rhodes formed a musical duo called Two Tons O' Fun (sometimes referred to as "The Two Tons"). Two Tons O' Fun debuted as Sylvester's backing vocalists on his self-titled third album Sylvester, released in 1977. The duo sang backup vocals on the album's singles "Down, Down, Down" and "Over and Over", which charted at number eighteen on the Billboard Dance chart. In an interview with Daily Xtra, Wash stated that working alongside Sylvester helped her hone her own vocal stylings. In 1978, Sylvester released his fourth album Step II, which also featured The Two Tons' background vocals throughout the album. "Dance (Disco Heat)", the album's lead single which prominently featured The Tons, peaked at number one on Billboard Dance chart and became their first number-one single on that chart. In 1979, Two Tons O' Fun sang backup on Sylvester's live album Living Proof. Later that year, the duo secured their own record deal with Fantasy Records.

On January 24, 1980, the duo released their debut self-titled album Two Tons of Fun. The album spawned two top-five dance singles: "Earth Can Be Just Like Heaven" and "I Got the Feeling". Their second album Backatcha was released later that year. The album spawned a single "I Depend On You" that peaked at number 72 on the Dance chart.

In September 1982, the duo released their single "It's Raining Men". The song became their biggest hit, peaking at number one on the Dance chart and number 46 on Billboard's Hot 100 chart. Following the success of the song, Two Tons o' Fun changed their group name to the Weather Girls. On January 22, 1983, they released their third album Success. The album's titled-track "Success" was released as the second single and peaked at number eighty-nine on the R&B chart. In 1985, the Weather Girls released their fourth album Big Girls Don't Cry. In 1986, Wash released a solo song, "Breakin' The Ice", on the soundtrack for the Paramount feature film Gung Ho. In 1988, the Weather Girls released their self-titled fourth album, Wash's final album with the duo. Shortly after the album, the Weather Girls disbanded and Wash took up a solo career and also began working as a session vocalist. Among other appearances, she contributed background vocals on Aretha Franklin's single "Freeway of Love" for her album Who's Zoomin' Who? (1985). Wash's vocals can also be heard in parts of Rebbie Jackson's song, "Centipede".

=== 1989–1991: Seduction, Black Box, and C+C Music Factory ===
In 1989, Wash recorded the song "(You're My One and Only) True Love" as a demo, produced by David Cole who would later form the C+C Music Factory. Cole later gave the song to then-upcoming female group Seduction. The song appeared on Seduction's debut album Nothing Matters Without Love, released in September 1989, retaining the use of Wash's lead vocals and added Seduction's background vocals to the song. In addition, she was only credited for her background vocals and Cole remixed and altered Wash's lead vocals of the song to make her voice less recognizable on the song. "(You're My One and Only) True Love" was released as Seduction's second single in July 1989. The single became an unexpected success when it peaked at number twenty-three on the Billboard Hot 100 chart and number three on the Dance chart. Wash would eventually file a lawsuit against the producers and A&M Records for unauthorized use of her voice. The case reached an out-of-court settlement in December 1990.

In mid-1989, the Italian house music group Black Box recruited Wash as a session singer to demo their upcoming songs. Wash demoed a total of six songs for the group. Black Box retained the use of Wash's vocals on the songs and released them on their debut album Dreamland without crediting Wash. In December 1989, Black Box released their second single "I Don't Know Anybody Else". The song, with Wash's vocals, became an international hit and peaked in the top-ten positions of many countries. The group followed up with release of another single "Everybody Everybody", also containing Wash's vocals, which became another international success. Black Box did not credit Wash for her vocals and instead used the French fashion model Katrin Quinol to lip-sync during music videos, televised performances, and concert performances. Wash sued RCA Records and Black Box for commercial appropriation in September 1990. RCA settled the case out-of-court in December 1990, agreeing to pay Wash a "substantial" financial fee. The company also signed her to an eight-album recording contract and financed her national tour. In addition, many of Black Box's releases that contained Wash's vocals were re-issued with her sleeve credits. Black Box continued releasing singles in 1991 which saw the release of the top-ten international hit "Strike It Up", "Fantasy" and "Open Your Eyes".

In November 1990, C+C Music Factory released their debut single "Gonna Make You Sweat (Everybody Dance Now)", which featured Wash's uncredited vocals on the chorus. The song became an international hit, peaking at number one on Billboard's Hot 100, and selling over a million copies in the United States. After discovering that the group was using model-turned-singer Zelma Davis in the music video, Wash attempted to negotiate with the producers of the C+C Music Factory for sleeve credits and royalties, which ultimately proved unsuccessful. Additionally, the song used an edited compilation of vocal parts that Wash recorded in June 1990 for an unrelated demonstration tape. On December 11, 1991, Wash filed a lawsuit in the Los Angeles Superior Court against C+C Music Factory's Robert Clivilles and David Cole, charging the producers and their record company, Sony Music Entertainment, with fraud, deceptive packaging and commercial appropriation. The case was eventually settled in 1994 and, as a result of the settlement, Sony made an unprecedented request to MTV to add a disclaimer that credited Wash for vocals and Zelma Davis (who lip-synched Wash's vocals in the official music video) for "visualization" to the "Gonna Make You Sweat" music video.

=== 1992–1995: Martha Wash ===
Her self-titled first solo album Martha Wash was released on February 23, 1993. The album peaked at number 169 on the Billboard 200, number 42 on the R&B Albums chart, and number 8 on the Heatseekers Albums chart. The album's lead single, "Carry On", released on October 30, 1992, became Wash's fifth number-one dance single as a solo artist in the US. The second single "Give It to You" also reached number one on the dance chart. The album's third single "Runaround" reached the top-ten on the Dance chart, but the follow-up single "So Whatcha Gonna Do" failed to chart. "Now That You're Gone" was also released as a promotional single.

In 1994, the C+C Music Factory, who had just reached an agreement with Wash and her lawsuit, asked Wash to join the group and record on their album. On August 9, 1994, the group released their second album Anything Goes!. The album's lead single "Do You Wanna Get Funky" featured a collaboration of Wash, C+C Music Factory, Zelma Davis, and Trilogy. "Do You Wanna Get Funky" peaked at number forty on the Hot 100 and number one on the Dance chart. Wash also featured another song "Takin' Over" from the album. In the same year, Wash also recorded and released a cover of Jean Knight's "Mr. Big Stuff" for the soundtrack of American sports comedy-drama film D2: The Mighty Ducks. In 1995, Wash embarked on an international tour with the C+C Music Factory.

=== 1996–1999: The Collection ===
In 1997, American DJ and record producer Todd Terry released his sixth album Ready for a New Day. The album's lead single "Keep on Jumpin'", featuring a collaboration of Terry, Wash, and Jocelyn Brown, was released on June 24, 1996. The song peaked on at number one on the Dance charts and reached the top-ten on the UK Singles chart. On June 9, 1997, they released a follow-up single "Something Goin' On (In Your Soul)". The song topped the Dance charts and peaked at number five on the UK Singles chart. Additionally, the song was also certified Silver-status in the United Kingdom.

In January 1998, Wash released a compilation album The Collection, on Logic Records. The lead single "It's Raining Men...The Sequel", which featured RuPaul, peaked at number twenty-two on the Dance chart. The album's second single "Catch the Light" became Wash's tenth number-one song on the Dance chart. The album's final single "Come" peaked at number four on the Dance chart. Wash was also featured on Todd Terry's single "Ready for a New Day", which peaked at number twenty on the Dance chart.

=== 2000–2010: Single releases ===
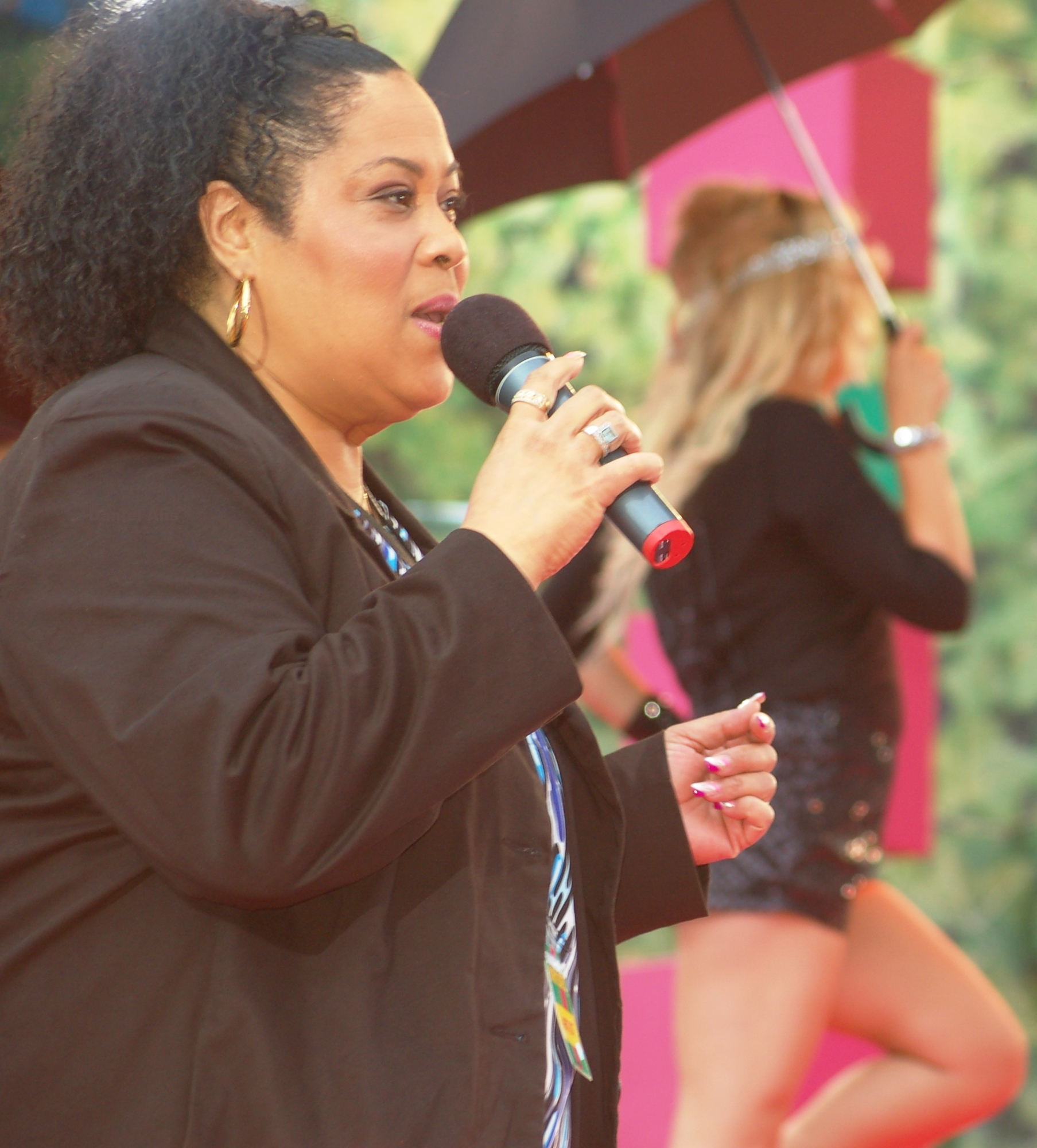
Wash performing at Sommarkrysset, Gröna Lund, in 2008

In 2000, Wash released two singles "Listen to the People" and re-recorded version of "It's Raining Men". In 2004, she released a gospel single "You Lift Me Up". Wash performed at the opening ceremony of the OutGames in Montreal in July 2006. She also performed at numerous Human Rights Campaign events in the U.S. In 2006, Wash appeared as a guest on GSN's I've Got a Secret, and performed "It's Raining Men" for the all-gay panel.

DJ Tony Moran's compilation CD The Event featured a single featuring Martha entitled "Keep Your Body Working". It reached No. 1 on Billboard's Hot Dance Club Play chart for the week ending December 22, 2007. In 2007, Gay Pimpin' with Jonny McGovern, gay-themed podcast, dedicated an episode to Wash and she obliged them with an extended telephone interview.

In March 2008, she performed at the annual Big Gay Day in Brisbane, Australia. She also performed at Chicago Pride Parade in June 2008. In August 2009, she performed at the opening ceremony of the NAGAAA Gay Softball World Series.

=== 2011–2017: Something Good ===
On October 1, 2012, she appeared on the Late Show with David Letterman, celebrating the 30th anniversary of the release of "It's Raining Men". Wash's second solo album Something Good was released on January 10, 2013, worldwide. The album's lead single "I've Got You", released on April 1, 2011, received positive feedback from critics. In March 2013, she was a special guest for the New York City Gay Men's Chorus during their spring production "Big Gay Sing 6: Club Night Out". The second single "It's My Time" was released on September 22, 2013. In the same year, Wash also made an appearance in the documentary film "20 Feet from Stardom". In February 2014, Wash was featured on the song "Can I Get An Amen?" for RuPaul's album Born Naked. In March 2014, Wash released a remix of the third single "I'm Not Coming Down", which peaked at number two on the Dance chart.

In February 2015, Wash and Tony Moran released "Free People", which also reached number one on the Dance Club Songs chart. In 2015, Wash formed a group with disco vocalists Evelyn "Champagne" King and Linda Clifford called First Ladies of Disco. The group released their debut single "Show Some Love" in March 2015, which peaked at number six on the Dance charts. In December 2015, Wash released a single "N2U", produced by Showtek and Eva Shaw on Spinnin' Records. In November 2017, Wash collaborated with Turkish singer Serhat, releasing a single with multi-versions of his Eurovision 2016 entry I Didn't Know.

=== 2018–present: Love & Conflict, First Ladies of Disco, and later career ===
In March 2018, Wash began her YouTube web series called "10 Minutes with Martha Wash". In April 2018, Wash released a single "Come into the Light". The song was featured on the musical film "Wholly Broken" for which Wash plays the role of a woman named "Rose". In September 2018, Wash joined the cast of WaistWatchers: The Musical.

In March 2019, First Ladies of Disco (now composed of Wash, Clifford, and Norma Jean Wright) released their second single "Don't Stop Me Now". On August 10, 2019, Wash released a single "Like Fire". The song served as the lead single from her third album Love & Conflict. Love & Conflict was released on January 6, 2020. In 2026, Wash co-headlined the It's Raining Queen Tour with American comedian Marsha Warfield.

== Legacy ==
As of 2014, songs featuring Wash's voice have earned fifteen number-one dance singles, placing her among the top singers with the most number-one hits on the U.S. Dance Club Songs chart. Her success as one of the leading singers in the genre of house music would garner her honorific title The Queen of Clubland. She has also been referred to as The Voice. In Rolling Stone, the critic Jason Newman described Martha Wash as "The Most Famous Unknown Singer of the '90s".

Martha Wash's work has influenced numerous artists including RuPaul, who stated that "[Wash] merged a gospel voice into pop and dance music seamlessly. Her voice speaks to both the church and a pop ear and was built to cut through the bass of a dance club. The timbre of her voice is so distinctive and beautiful. A lot of gospel-based singers have come and gone in dance music, but she is the one." RuPaul acknowledged Wash's song "Carry On" comforted him during his mother's death. Her single with the C+C Music Factory, "Gonna Make You Sweat (Everybody Dance Now)" was included in the top-ten VH1's "100 Greatest Dance Songs", while "It's Raining Men" ranked at number thirty-five.

On September 14, 2014, Mighty Real: A Fabulous Sylvester Musical, a Broadway musical about Sylvester, debuted in New York City. Wash's likeness was featured in the production and she was portrayed by actress Jacqueline B. Arnold. In 2023, Rolling Stone ranked Wash at number 179 on its list of the 200 Greatest Singers of All Time.

== Business and ventures ==
Purple Rose Records
- Founded: 2004; 22 years ago
- Founder: Martha Wash
- Genre: House, adult contemporary
- Country of origin: United States
- Location: New York City
- Official website: purpleroserecords.com

=== Purple Rose Records ===
In 2004, Wash launched her own independent recording label called Purple Rose Records. James Washington, also Wash's manager, is the label's head of A&R. Intended to be a platform for emerging talent and for artists who may be overlooked by major record labels, Purple Rose Records was established in New York City. The first release on the label was the single "You Lift Me Up" in September 2004, a song by Wash, which peaked in the top five of Billboard's Dance Club Songs chart. Something Good, Wash's second album, was the label's first album released in January 2013. The label has continued to distribute all of Wash's official releases to date.

Purple Rose also began managing other musical acts. First Ladies of Disco, a female group originally composed of Martha Wash, Linda Clifford, and Evelyn "Champagne" King, released their debut single "Show Some Love" on the label in 2015. The song peaked in the top-ten on Billboard's Dance chart. The group has since toured throughout the United States of America on the First Ladies of Disco Tour. In July 2016, The Ritchie Family released a single "Ice" on the label. The song was later remixed and released as a maxi-single of six tracks.

On March 25, 2019, First Ladies of Disco released their second single "Don't Stop Me Now" on Purple Rose Records.

=== Activism ===
In 1990, Wash won lawsuits against music groups C+C Music Factory and Black Box for failing to provide vocal credits for songs she recorded with them as well as committing fraud by using models to lip-sync her vocals in music videos, stage shows, and televised performances. The lawsuit was filed under the truth-in-advertising laws. In the same year, bills were introduced in the New Jersey and New York legislatures to require concert promoters to disclose whether pre-recorded material would be used on stage. Wash's activism and legal wranglings on behalf of recording artists also resulted in eventual federal legislation making vocal credit mandatory for all albums and music videos.

Wash, who is viewed as a gay icon, has been involved in LGBT rights and she remains an outspoken advocate for the gay community. In an open letter addressed to the LGBT community, Wash acknowledged the support she has received back from the community. Wash also stated "It means the world to me when fans tell me they've followed me through the Sylvester years, or they came out to my music, or someone decided not to take their life. These are the people I sing for. So to all you beautiful people out there I say: stand strong, don't give in and carry on." Wash has also been an activist for the fight against HIV/AIDS for more than thirty years after watching close-friend and music mentor Sylvester succumb to the disease. On World AIDS Day in December 2012, she was awarded a Lifetime Achievement Award in San Francisco from the AIDS Emergency Fund for her advocacy and fundraising to provide financial assistance to victims of the disease.

=== Philanthropy ===
Wash is a spokesperson for Quality Services for the Autism Community (QSAC Inc.). The non-profit organization providing comprehensive services to individuals with autism and their families. In 2011, Wash headlined three separate charity concerts for the nonprofit AIDS organization: Fortitude, a President's Day weekend celebration in Fort Lauderdale benefiting amfAR, and two local San Antonio AIDS charities. Wash released a song "Light It Up", included on the 13th Carols for a Cure 2011 charity album to help raise funds benefiting Broadway Cares/Equity Fights AIDS. In 2012, Wash became a supporter of the You Can Play Project. The non-profit organization is dedicated to ensuring equality, respect, and safety for all athletes without regard to sexual orientation.

== Personal life ==
Wash resides in Baldwin, New York, on Long Island.

== Discography ==
=== Albums ===
- 1993: Martha Wash
- 2013: Something Good
- 2020: Love & Conflict

== Filmography ==
List of acting performances in film and television
Title	Year	Role	Notes	Ref.
Wholly Broken	2018	Rose	Supporting role	
If Only We Knew How We Got Here	2019	Hanna	Supporting role	

List of acting performances in theatre
Title	Year	Role	Notes	Ref.
Love on Layaway	2003	Willanetta	Supporting role	
I Want to Eat Brains (or the Day I Killed All My Friends)	2017	Herself	Lead role	
WaistWatchers: The Musical	2018	Herself	Supporting role	

== Tours ==
- Living Proof Tour (with Sylvester and Two Tons o' Fun) (1979)
- It's Raining Men Tour (with the Weather Girls) (1983)
- Martha Wash World Tour (1992–1993)
- C+C Music Factory Tour (with C+C Music Factory and Trilogy) (1995)
- First Ladies of Disco Show (with Linda Clifford, Evelyn "Champagne" King, Norma Jean Wright) (2017–2019)
- WaistWatchers: The Musical (2018)
- It's Raining Queens (with Marsha Warfield) (2026)

== See also ==
- Honorific nicknames in popular music
- List of artists who reached number one in the United States
- List of artists who reached number one on the U.S. Dance chart
- List of artists with the most number ones on the U.S. dance chart
- List of number-one dance hits (United States)
