= Sylvester (album) =

Studio album by Sylvester
- Released: 1977
- Recorded: February–March 1977
- Studio: Fantasy, Berkeley, California
- Genre: Disco
- Length: 34:58
- Label: Fantasy
- Producer: Harvey Fuqua

Sylvester chronology
Bazaar (1973)	Sylvester (1977)	Step II (1978)

Singles from Sylvester
- 1. "Down, Down, Down" Released: 1977; 2. "Over and Over" Released: August 1977

Professional ratings
Review scores
Source	Rating
AllMusic	4/5 stars

Sylvester is an album by the American musician Sylvester, released in 1977. Previously Sylvester had released two albums on the Blue Thumb Records credited to Sylvester and the Hot Band. It was his first disco album in the series of three that were recorded and released by Fantasy Records in the late 1970s. The album was issued with the alternative title Over and Over in France.

Two singles were issued from the album. The first single, a self-penned song called "Down, Down, Down", charted at number 18 on the Billboard Dance chart. The following single "Over and Over" written by Ashford & Simpson failed to make any impression on the charts. On the track "I've Been Down", the lead vocals are performed by Izora Rhodes and Martha Wash, known at the time as Two Tons o' Fun, they later went on to record as The Weather Girls. The album was re-issued on compact disc in the UK by Southbound Records in 1995, together with the album Step II, this release features no bonus tracks.

== Track listing ==
Side A

1. "Over and Over" (Nickolas Ashford, Valerie Simpson) – 6:58
2. "I Tried to Forget You" (Sylvester James, James "Tip" Wirrick) – 4:59
3. "Changes" (James) – 3:07
4. "Tipsong" (James, Wirrick) – 3:59

Side B

1. "Down, Down, Down" (James) – 5:18
2. "Loving Grows Up Slow" (Morgan Ames) – 4:01
3. "I Been Down" (Rob Galbraith, Maury Keener) – 3:39
4. "Never Too Late" (James) – 2:57

== Personnel ==
Musicians

- Sylvester – lead vocals and backing vocals
- The Weather Girls (Izora Armstead, Martha Wash) – lead vocals and backing vocals
- James "Tip" Wirrick – electric guitar
- Dan Reich – synthesizers and electric piano
- John Dunstan – bass
- Jack "Sandyjack" Reiner – drums
- David Frazier – percussion
- Leslie Drayton – string and horn arrangements

Production

- Harvey Fuqua – producer
- Sylvester James – co-production
- Eddie Bill Harris – mixing engineer (tracks 4, 5, 7 and 8)
- Phil Kaffel – mixing engineer (tracks 1, 2, 3 and 6)
- Phil Bray – photographer
- Phil Carroll – art direction
- Jamie Putnam – design

== Release history ==
LP

- 1977 – Fantasy Records F-9531.

CD

- 1995 – Southbound Records CDSEWD 104
