= Someone like You (Sylvester song) =

"Someone Like You"

Single by Sylvester

from the album Mutual Attraction
- B-side: "Someone Like You" (Larry Levan mix)
- Released: 1986
- Length: 6:11
- Label: Warner Bros. Records
- Songwriter(s): Len Barry, McKinley Horton
- Producer(s): Ken Kessie, Morey Goldstein

Sylvester singles chronology
"Living for the City" (1986)	"Someone Like You" (1986)	"Mutual Attraction" (1987)

"Someone Like You" is a 1986 dance single by Sylvester. The song was written by Len Barry and McKinley Horton. It was produced by Ken Kessie and Morey Goldstein. The single was Sylvester's second and last entry to reach number one on the dance charts, where it stayed for one week. "Someone like You", also went to number nineteen on the soul chart, and was Sylvester's highest chart entry, since 1978.

The single sleeve was designed by artist Keith Haring.

== Track listing ==
US 7" single

1. "Someone Like You" - 4:10
2. "Someone Like You" (Larry Levan mix) - 4:30

US 12" Maxi-Single

1. "Someone Like You" - 6:11
2. "Someone Like You" (Joseph Watt remix) - 5:46
3. "Someone Like You" (Larry Levan mix) - 5:58
4. "Someone Like You (Dub)" (Larry Levan mix) - 6:35
