= Step II =

Studio album by Sylvester
- Released: 1978
- Studio: Fantasy (Berkeley, California); Conway (Los Angeles, California); Clark-Brown Audio (Los Angeles, California)
- Genre: Disco; Hi-NRG
- Length: 35:17
- Label: Fantasy
- Producer: Harvey Fuqua, Sylvester

Sylvester chronology
Sylvester (1977)	Step II (1978)	Stars (1979)

Singles from Step II
- 1. "Dance (Disco Heat)" Released: August 1978; 2. "You Make Me Feel (Mighty Real)" Released: October 1978

Professional ratings
Review scores
Source	Rating
AllMusic	5/5 stars
Christgau's Record Guide	B+
Pitchfork	9.2/10
The Virgin Encyclopedia of R&B and Soul	3/5 stars

Step II is the fourth studio album by American singer Sylvester, released in 1978 on the Fantasy label.

== Commercial performance ==
The album peaked at No. 7 on the R&B albums chart. It also reached No. 28 on the Billboard 200. The album features the singles "Dance (Disco Heat)", which peaked at No. 4 on the Hot Soul Singles chart and No. 19 on the Billboard Hot 100, and "You Make Me Feel (Mighty Real)", which charted at No. 20 on the Hot Soul Singles chart and No. 36 on the Billboard Hot 100. Both songs reached No. 1 on the Hot Dance Club Play chart. The album was certified Gold by the RIAA on February 13, 1979.

== Track listing ==
Side one
No.	Title	Writer(s)	Length
1.	"You Make Me Feel (Mighty Real)"	Sylvester, James "Tip" Wirrick	6:39
2.	"Dance (Disco Heat)"	Eric Robinson, Victor Orsborn	5:50
3.	"You Make Me Feel (Mighty Real) – Epilogue"	Sylvester, James "Tip" Wirrick	3:19

Side two
No.	Title	Writer(s)	Length
4.	"Grateful"	Sylvester, Michael Finden	3:27
5.	"I Took My Strength from You"	Burt Bacharach, Hal David	7:16
6.	"Was It Something That I Said"	Sylvester, Harvey Fuqua	4:15
7.	"Just You and Me Forever"	Eric Robinson, Victor Orsborn	4:31

== Personnel ==
- Sylvester – lead vocals and backing vocals, acoustic piano
- Patrick Cowley – string, Electro-comp 101 and 200 models synthesizers and Oberheim DS-2 sequencer, special effects
- Michael Finden – electric piano, organ and clavinet
- James "Tip" Wirrick – electric guitar
- Eric Robinson – acoustic piano (track 7)
- Bob Kingson – bass (tracks 1–6)
- James Jamerson, Jr. – bass (track 7)
- Randy Merritt – drums (tracks 1–6)
- James Gadson – drums (track 7)
- David Frazier – percussion
- George Bohanon – horns
- Charles Veal Jr. – strings, concertmaster
- Izora Rhodes, Martha Wash – backing vocals
- Leslie Drayton – string and horn arrangements

Technical

- Nancy C. Pitts – associate producer
- Eddie Bill Harris – remix
- Phil Bray – photography

== Charts ==
Album

Chart (1978)	Peak position
Australian Albums (Kent Music Report)	74
US Billboard Top LPs	28
US Billboard Top Soul LPs	7

Singles

Year	Title	Peaks		
Year	Title	US	US R&B	US Dan
1978	"Dance (Disco Heat)"	19	4	1
1978	"You Make Me Feel (Mighty Real)"	36	20	1
