= First Ladies of Disco =

American girl group

- Origin: New York City, New York, U.S.
- Genres: Disco; adult contemporary; pop
- Years active: 2015-present
- Label: Purple Rose
- Members: Martha Wash; Linda Clifford; Norma Jean Wright
- Past members: Evelyn "Champagne" King
- Website: firstladiesofdiscoshow.com

First Ladies of Disco is an American girl supergroup originally composed of Martha Wash, Linda Clifford, and Evelyn "Champagne" King. The group was formed in 2015 by James Washington, Wash's manager. Their group name was inspired by James Arena's book First Ladies of Disco: 32 Stars Discuss the Era and Their Singing Careers (2013), which includes interviews from the individual members of the group. In March 2015, the First Ladies of Disco released their debut single "Show Some Love" on Wash's record label Purple Rose Records. A remix of the single peaked at number six on Billboard's Dance chart.

In 2017, the group embarked on their first tour called "First Ladies of Disco Show". In December 2017, King left the group and was replaced with former Chic vocalist Norma Jean Wright in February 2018. In March 2019, the group released their second single "Don't Stop Me Now".

== Discography ==
=== Singles ===
Title	Year	Peak chart positions		Album
Title	Year	US Dance	US Electronic	Album
"Show Some Love"	2015	6	45	Non-album single
"Don't Stop Me Now"	2019	9	42	Non-album single

== Tours ==
- First Ladies of Disco Show (2017–2019)
