= Sylvester (singer) =

American singer-songwriter (1947–1988)

- Sylvester in 1979
- Born: Sylvester James Jr. September 6, 1947; Los Angeles, California
- Died: December 16, 1988 (aged 41); San Francisco, California, U.S.
- Cause of death: HIV/AIDS
- Resting place: Inglewood Park Cemetery, Inglewood, California, U.S.
- Occupations: Singer-songwriter; composer; record producer
- Musical career
- Genres: Disco; hi-NRG; R&B; soul; glam rock (early)
- Instruments: Vocals; keyboards; piano
- Years active: 1962–1988
- Labels: Blue Thumb; Fantasy; Megatone
- Formerly of: Sylvester and his Hot Band
- Website: sylvesterofficial.com

Sylvester James Jr. (September 6, 1947 – December 16, 1988), known simply as Sylvester, was an American singer-songwriter. Primarily active in the genres of disco, rhythm and blues, and soul, he was known for his flamboyant and androgynous appearance, falsetto singing voice, and hit disco singles in the late 1970s and 1980s.

Born in Watts, Los Angeles, to a middle-class African-American family, Sylvester developed a love of singing through the gospel choir of his Pentecostal church. Leaving the church after the congregation expressed disapproval of his homosexuality, he found friendship among a group of Black cross-dressers and transgender women who called themselves the Disquotays. Moving to San Francisco in 1970 at the age of 22, Sylvester embraced the counterculture and joined the avant-garde drag troupe the Cockettes, producing solo segments of their shows, which were heavily influenced by female blues and jazz singers such as Billie Holiday and Josephine Baker. During the Cockettes' critically panned tour of New York City, Sylvester left them to pursue his career elsewhere. He came to front Sylvester and his Hot Band, a R&B and glam rock act that released two commercially unsuccessful albums on Blue Thumb Records in 1973 before disbanding.

Focusing on a solo career, Sylvester signed a recording contract with Harvey Fuqua of Fantasy Records and obtained three new backing singers in the form of Martha Wash and Izora Rhodes – the "Two Tons O' Fun" – as well as Jeanie Tracy. His first solo album, Sylvester (1977), was a moderate success. This was followed with the acclaimed disco album Step II (1978), which spawned the singles "You Make Me Feel (Mighty Real)" and "Dance (Disco Heat)", both of which were hits in the US and Europe. Distancing himself from the disco genre, he recorded four more albums – including a live album – with Fantasy Records. After leaving this label, he signed to Megatone Records, the dance-oriented company founded by friend and collaborator Patrick Cowley, where he recorded four more albums, including the Cowley penned hit Hi-NRG track "Do Ya Wanna Funk". Sylvester was an activist who campaigned against the spread of HIV/AIDS. He died from complications arising from the virus in 1988, leaving all future royalties from his work to San Francisco-based HIV/AIDS charities.

During the late 1970s, Sylvester gained the nickname of the "Queen of Disco" and during his life he attained particular recognition in San Francisco, where he was awarded the key to the city. In 2005, he was posthumously inducted into the Dance Music Hall of Fame, while his life has been recorded in a biography and made the subject of both a documentary and a musical.

== Early life ==
=== 1947–1960: Childhood ===
"Oh God, don't ask me how I got started or how old I am or about The Cockettes. Let's just say that I came from an upper-middle class Black bourgeois family in Los Angeles, and that I left a boring nine-to-five job to move to San Francisco. Better yet, let's say I was the first test tube baby."

— Sylvester

Sylvester James was born on September 6, 1947, in the Watts district of Los Angeles, California, into a middle-class family. His mother, Letha Weaver, had been raised near Palestine, Arkansas, into a relatively wealthy African-American family, who owned their own farmland. Letha's biological mother, Gertha Weaver, was unmarried and too sickly to care for her child, so Gertha's sister Julia, known to the family as JuJu, became Letha's adoptive mother.

In the late 1930s, Letha, Julia, and Julia's husband took part in the Great Migration of African-Americans out of the Southern United States, relocating to Watts, where Letha married her first husband, Sylvester "Sweet" James. The couple moved into a small cottage owned by Letha's parents. Their first child, named Sylvester after his father, was followed by the birth of John Wesley in 1948 and Larry in 1950.

Sylvester and his brothers became better known in their predominantly African-American community by their nicknames, with Sylvester's being "Dooni". Sylvester considered his father to be a "lowlife" because he was an adulterer and left his wife and children when the boys were still young. Letha and her three sons moved to a downtown housing project at Aliso Village before moving back into her parental home at 114th Street in Watts.

Letha was a devout adherent of the Pentecostal denomination of Christianity, regularly attending the Palm Lane Church of God in Christ in South Los Angeles. Sylvester and his brothers accompanied her to the church's services, where he developed a particular interest in gospel music. Having been an avid singer since the age of three, Sylvester regularly joined in with gospel performances. He sang the song "My Buddy" at the funeral of one of the other children in the Park Lane congregation.

The women at his church described him as "feminine" and as "pretty as he could be, just like his mother." "He wasn't rough like the other boys. He was prim and proper. We were always hugging on him and kissing on him, because he was so cute." Family members also described him as "his own kind of boy — 'born funny'" — preferring the company of girls and women like his grandmother to that of other boys. "He stayed inside a lot, reading encyclopedias, listening to music, and playing his grandmother's piano." When Sylvester would turn down the boys' invitations to play with them, they would say things like, "He act like a girl!" or "He's going to be a girl." But his mother would defend him, including his joy at dressing up in her and his grandmother's clothes, saying that he was not a girl, just a different kind of boy, and a valued part of their family.

At the age of eight, he was sexually molested by a man at the church – at the time rumored to be the church organist. Although Sylvester would always maintain that this interaction had been consensual and not sexual molestation, Sylvester was only a child at the time of this incident, while the assailant was an adult. Because of the injuries caused by the rape, Sylvester had to be taken to a doctor, who told Sylvester's mother that her son was gay. Viewing homosexuality as a perversion and a sin, Letha had a difficulty accepting that. News of Sylvester's "homosexual activity" soon spread through the church congregation and, feeling unwelcome, he ceased his attendance at age 13.

During Sylvester's childhood, his mother gave birth to three more children by different fathers before marrying Robert "Sonny" Hurd in the early 1960s, with whom she adopted three foster children. A supervisor at aerospace manufacturer North American Rockwell, Hurd's job increased the family income and they were able to move into a more expensive, predominantly white neighborhood north of Watts. The relationship between Sylvester and both his mother and stepfather was strained; in the midst of one argument with his mother, Sylvester decided to leave their house permanently.

=== 1960–1970: The Disquotays ===
Now homeless, Sylvester spent much of the next decade staying with friends and relatives, in particular, his grandmother Julia, who expressed no disapproval of his homosexuality, having been a friend of a number of gay men in the 1930s. On occasion, he returned to his mother and step-father's house for a few days at a time, particularly to spend time with his younger sisters, Bernadette and Bernadine. Aged 15, he began frequenting local gay clubs and built up a group of friends from the local gay Black community, eventually forming themselves into a group which they called the Disquotays. Sylvester's best friend among the Disquotays was a trans woman named Duchess, who earned her money as a prostitute, a job that Sylvester refused to engage in. The group held lavish house parties, sometimes without permission at the home of their friend, rhythm and blues singer Etta James, in which they dressed up in female clothing and wigs, constantly trying to outdo one another in appearance.

"Dooni [Sylvester] and the Disquotays wandered the streets of South Central in the 1960s done up like women, and threw ferocious gay parties in neighborhoods whose strongest institutions were conservative Black churches. It's tempting to see them as fearless and heroic, defiant sissies who were forerunners of Stonewall and sixties counterculture, part of the dawning of gay liberation and African-American civil rights organizing."

— Biographer Joshua Gamson, 2005

Sylvester's boyfriend during the latter part of the 1960s was a young man named Lonnie Prince; well-built and attractive, many of Sylvester's friends described the pair as being "the It couple". Sylvester often hitchhiked around town while in female dress. Such activity carried a risk of arrest and prosecution, for cross-dressing was then illegal in California. Although avoiding imprisonment for this crime, he was arrested for shoplifting on several occasions.

He found work in a variety of professions, including cooking in McDonald's—where he was fired for refusing to wear a hairnet—cashier at an airport parking garage, working in a hair salon, at a department store, and as a make-up artist at a mortuary, preparing the corpses for their funerals. In the 1960s, the Civil Rights Movement was at its peak, but Sylvester and his friends did not take an active role within it. During the Watts riots between members of the Black community and the predominantly white police force, they joined in with the widespread rioting and looting, stealing wigs, hairspray, and lipstick.

Although he had little interest in formal education and rarely attended classes, Sylvester was enrolled at Jordan High School. He graduated in 1969 at the age of 21. In his graduation photograph, he appeared in drag wearing a blue chiffon prom dress and beehive hairstyle. By the end of the decade, the Disquotays had begun to drift apart, with a number of them abandoning cross-dressing and others recognizing that they were trans women and undergoing sex reassignment surgery. Sylvester always considered himself male and began to modify the feminine nature of his clothing, aiming for a more androgynous look which combined male and female styles, influenced by the fashions of the hippie movement.

=== 1970–1972: The Cockettes ===
"Sylvester shared the Cockettes' affinity for outrageous flaming, their celebration of sex and gayness, their love of acid and good hash, and their bent movie-musical fantasies. Like them, he was making himself up, fantasizing a self into existence. But he usually stood a few feet back, among the Cockettes but never quite one of them. His drag and makeup, for one thing, were almost staid in comparison with the Cockettes'; they preferred facial designs that were almost like war paint, and clothing that didn't make sense. Sylvester wore simple period dresses onstage, and created the face of a sane, pretty woman."

— Biographer Joshua Gamson, 2005

At Los Angeles' Whisky a Go Go bar, Sylvester met Reggie Dunnigan, who invited him to move to the city of San Francisco in Northern California to join the "Chocolate Cockettes"—Black members of an avant-garde performance art drag troupe known as the Cockettes. Founded by drag queen Hibiscus in 1970, the Cockettes parodied popular culture, were involved in the Gay Liberation movement, and were influenced by the ethos of the hippie movement, living communally, embracing free love, and consuming mind-altering substances such as marijuana and LSD.

With the Disquotays disbanded, Sylvester had tired of Los Angeles, and was attracted by San Francisco's reputation as a gay and counter-cultural haven. Arriving in the city, he stayed in the Cockettes' communal home for several days. They were impressed with his falsetto singing voice and his ability to play the piano, asking him to appear in an upcoming show, Radio Rodeo. Sylvester agreed, and one of his first performances involved singing the theme song of The Mickey Mouse Club while dressed in a cowgirl skirt. Moving into the Cockettes' communal residence, he soon found the flat too crowded and had difficulty with the lack of privacy; after a year he moved into a new house on Market Street with two fellow Cockettes.

Although a significant member of the troupe, Sylvester remained a relatively isolated figure; not only was he one of very few African-American members, he eschewed the group's more surrealist activities for what he saw as classier, more glamorous performances onstage. In the Cockettes' performances, he was usually given an entire scene to himself, often with little relevance to the narrative and theme of the rest of the show, although through doing so, he gained his own following. With a piano player named Peter Mintun, Sylvester worked on solo scenes in which he exhibited his interest in blues and jazz by imitating several of his musical idols such as Billie Holiday and Josephine Baker. Adding to his image, Sylvester used the pseudonym "Ruby Blue" and described himself as "Billie Holiday's cousin once removed". Fascinated by Black musical heritage, he read up on the subject and became a collector of "negrobilia"; in some of his Cockette performances, he played up to racial stereotypes of African-Americans to ridicule the stereotypes themselves.

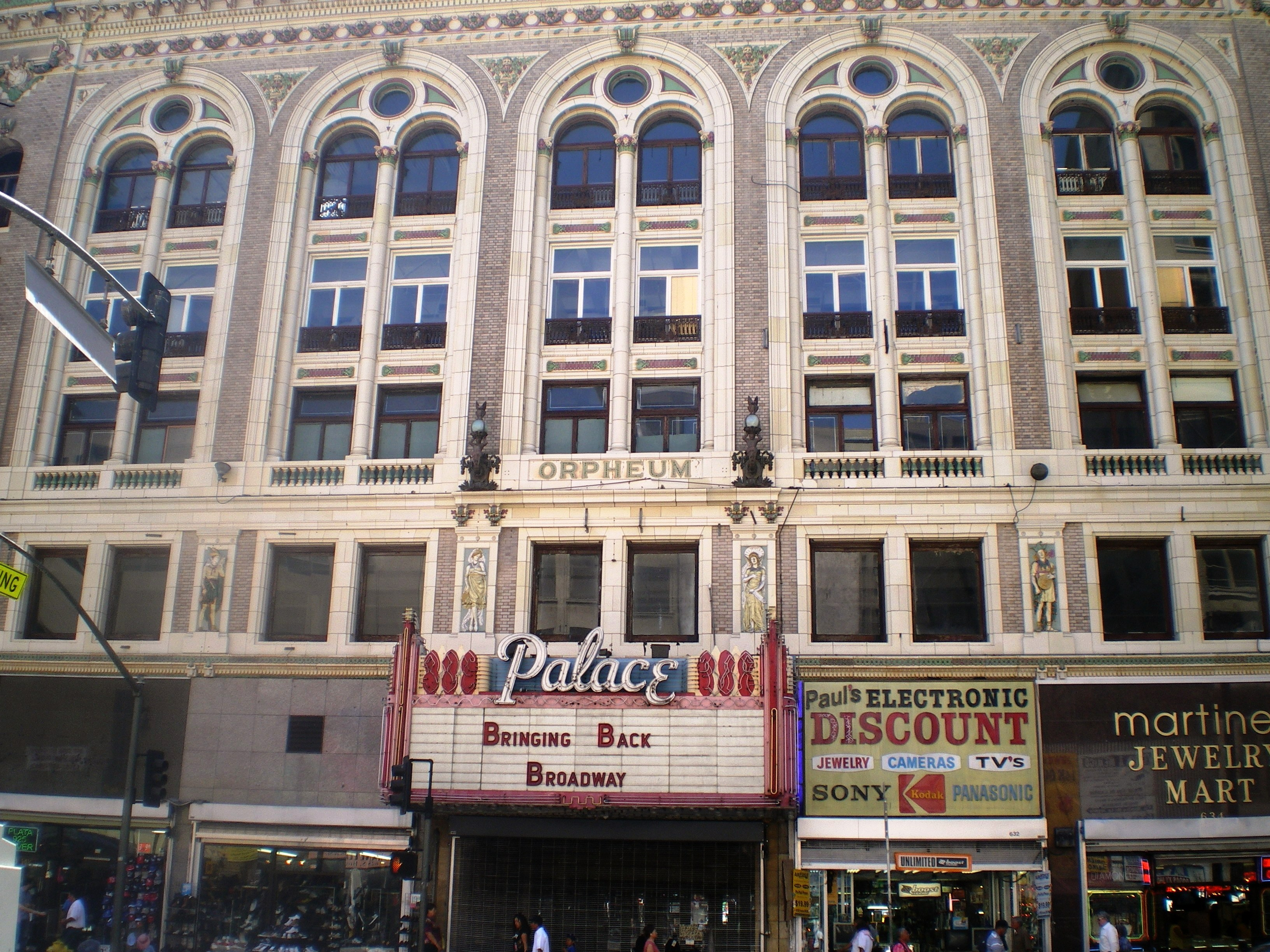
Palace Theater, where Sylvester performed a one-man show

In 1970, Sylvester entered into an open relationship with Michael Lyons, a young white man, and soon proposed marriage to him. Although same-sex marriage was not legally recognized in the US, the couple held a wedding in the Shakespeare Garden of Golden Gate Park. At the invitation of the manager of the Palace Theater, Sylvester appeared in a spoof film, Tricia's Wedding, which parodied the marriage of Tricia Nixon Cox, daughter of President Richard Nixon. In the film, Sylvester played the role of both Coretta Scott King and the African ambassador Uma King.

In 1971, Sylvester was given a one-man show, Sylvester Sings, at the Palace Theater, for which he was accompanied by Peter Mintun. He nevertheless remained a part of the Cockette troupe during their divisive split, in which Hibiscus and his followers left to form the Angels of Light. Following Hibiscus' departure, the Cockettes began to gain increasing media attention, with celebrities such as Rex Reed, Truman Capote, and Gloria Vanderbilt enthusing about their performances. Rolling Stone magazine singled out Sylvester's performances for particular praise, describing him as "a beautiful Black androgyne who has a gospel sound with the heat and shimmer of Aretha".

The success led the troupe to take their show to New York City, a city with a long history of drag culture. Arriving in November 1971, they immersed themselves in the city's avant-garde, attending parties held by Andy Warhol and Screw magazine. Spending so much of their time partying, most of the Cockettes did not rehearse, the exception being Sylvester, who wanted to perfect his act. Although the Cockettes' performance at the Anderson Theater was panned by critics, Sylvester's act was widely praised as a highlight of the show. Realizing that he had far better prospects as a solo artist, on the second New York performance he opened his act by telling the audience, "I apologize for this travesty that I'm associated with", while on the seventh he announced that he would be leaving the Cockettes altogether.

== Emerging solo career ==
=== 1972–1974: Sylvester and his Hot Band ===
Returning to San Francisco, Sylvester was offered the opportunity to record a demo album by Rolling Stone editor Jann Wenner. Financed by A&M Records, the album featured a cover of Bonnie Bramlett and Leon Russell's song "Superstar", which had been a recent hit single for the Carpenters. Nevertheless, A&M felt that the work was not commercially viable and declined to release the album. For the album, Sylvester and his manager Dennis Lopez had assembled a group of heterosexual white males—Bobby Blood on trumpet, Chris Mostert on saxophone, James Q. Smith on guitar, Travis Fullerton on drums, and Kerry Hatch on bass—whom he named the Hot Band.

After A&M's initial rejection, the band provided two songs for Lights Out San Francisco, an album compiled by San Francisco's KSAN radio and released on the Blue Thumb label. Gaining a number of local gigs, they were eventually asked to open for English glam rock star David Bowie at the Winterland Ballroom. The gig did not sell particularly well, and Bowie later commented that San Francisco did not need him, because "They've got Sylvester", referring to their shared preference for androgyny.

In early 1973, Sylvester and the Hot Band were signed by Bob Krasnow to Blue Thumb. On this label, they produced their first album, in which they switched their sound from blues to the more commercially viable rock, while the Pointer Sisters were employed as backing singers. Sylvester named this first album Scratch My Flower due to a gardenia-shaped scratch-and-sniff sticker adhered to the cover, although it was instead released under the title of Sylvester and his Hot Band. The album consisted primarily of covers of songs by artists such as James Taylor, Ray Charles, Neil Young, and Leiber and Stoller. Described by one of Sylvester's biographers as lacking in "the fire and focus of the live shows", it sold poorly on release.

Sylvester and his Hot Band toured the United States, receiving threats of violence in several Southern states, where widespread conservative and racist attitudes led to antagonism between the band and locals. In late 1973, the band recorded their second album, Bazaar, which included both cover songs and original compositions by bassist Kerry Hatch. Hatch later commented that the Hot Band found the album more satisfactory than its predecessor, but nevertheless it again sold poorly. The music journalist Peter Shapiro believed that on these Blue Thumb albums, Sylvester's "cottony falsetto was an uncomfortable match with guitars" and that they both had "an unpleasantly astringent quality". Finding Sylvester difficult to work with, and frustrated by his lack of commercial success, the Hot Band left Sylvester in late 1974, after which Krasnow canceled his recording contract. At the same time, Sylvester's relationship with Lyons ended, with Lyons himself moving to Hawaii.

=== 1974–1977: Two Tons O' Fun and Sylvester ===
Now without the Hot Band or a recording contract, Sylvester set himself up with a new band, the Four As, and a new set of backing singers, two Black drag queens named Gerry Kirby and Lady Bianca. With this new entourage, he continued to perform at a number of local venues including Jewel's Catch One, a predominantly Black gay dance club on West Pico Avenue in Los Angeles, but reviewers were unimpressed with the new line-up, most of whom abandoned Sylvester in December 1974. After a brief sojourn in England, Sylvester returned to San Francisco and assembled three young drag queens to be backing singers: Arnold Elzie, Leroy Davis, and Gerry Kirby. Nevertheless, although he performed at such events as the 1975 Castro Street Fair, success continued to elude him, and he eventually fired Elzie, Davis, and Kirby.

"Something clicked and sighed into place when Sylvester and the Tons got together – something that wasn't there with the Hot Band white boys, for all that they could cook; something that wasn't there with Peter Mintun, for all the beautiful oddness that he and Sylvester shared; something that wasn't even there with the Black drag-queen singers, for all the fierceness they projected. Izora and Martha were whom he came from and who he was ... They were women who got their own. They sounded right with Sylvester, and looked just right, one on either side of him. Plus, next to them, Sylvester, who had grown quite round, looked positively svelte."

— Biographer Joshua Gamson, 2005.

Sylvester employed Brent Thomson as his new manager; she suggested that he rid himself of his androgynous image and wear more masculine clothing to gain a recording contract; as she put it, "nobody is giving out recording contracts to drag queens". Thomson opened auditions for new backing singers, with Sylvester being captivated by one of those auditioning, Martha Wash. Sylvester asked her if she had another large Black friend who could sing, after which she introduced him to Izora Rhodes. Although he referred to them simply as "the girls", Wash and Rhodes named themselves the Two Tons O' Fun (and much later, when they achieved mainstream success, as the Weather Girls), and continued to work with Sylvester intermittently until his death, developing a close friendship with him. They were soon joined by bassist John Dunstan and keyboard player Dan Reich.

Playing gay bars such as The Stud and The EndUp, in September 1976 Sylvester and his band gained a regular weekend job at The Palms nightclub on Polk Street, performing two or three sets a night; most of these were covers, but some were original compositions by Sylvester and his then-guitarist Tip Wirrick. It was through this show that Sylvester came to the attention of Motown producer Harvey Fuqua, and Fuqua subsequently signed Sylvester onto a solo deal with Fantasy Records in 1977.

In the middle of that year, he recorded his third album, the self-titled Sylvester, which featured a cover design depicting Sylvester in male attire. The songs included on the album were influenced by dance music, and included Sylvester's own compositions, such as "Never Too Late", as well as covers of hits such as Ashford & Simpson's "Over and Over". Many reviewers noted that Sylvester's image had been altered since his early career, moving him away from the glittery androgynous appearance to that of a more conventional rhythm-and-blues singer which would have wider commercial appeal. Released as a single, Sylvester's "Over and Over" proved a minor hit in the US, but was more successful in Mexico and Europe. Building on the album's release, Sylvester toured Louisiana and then Mexico City.

=== 1978: Step II and disco success ===
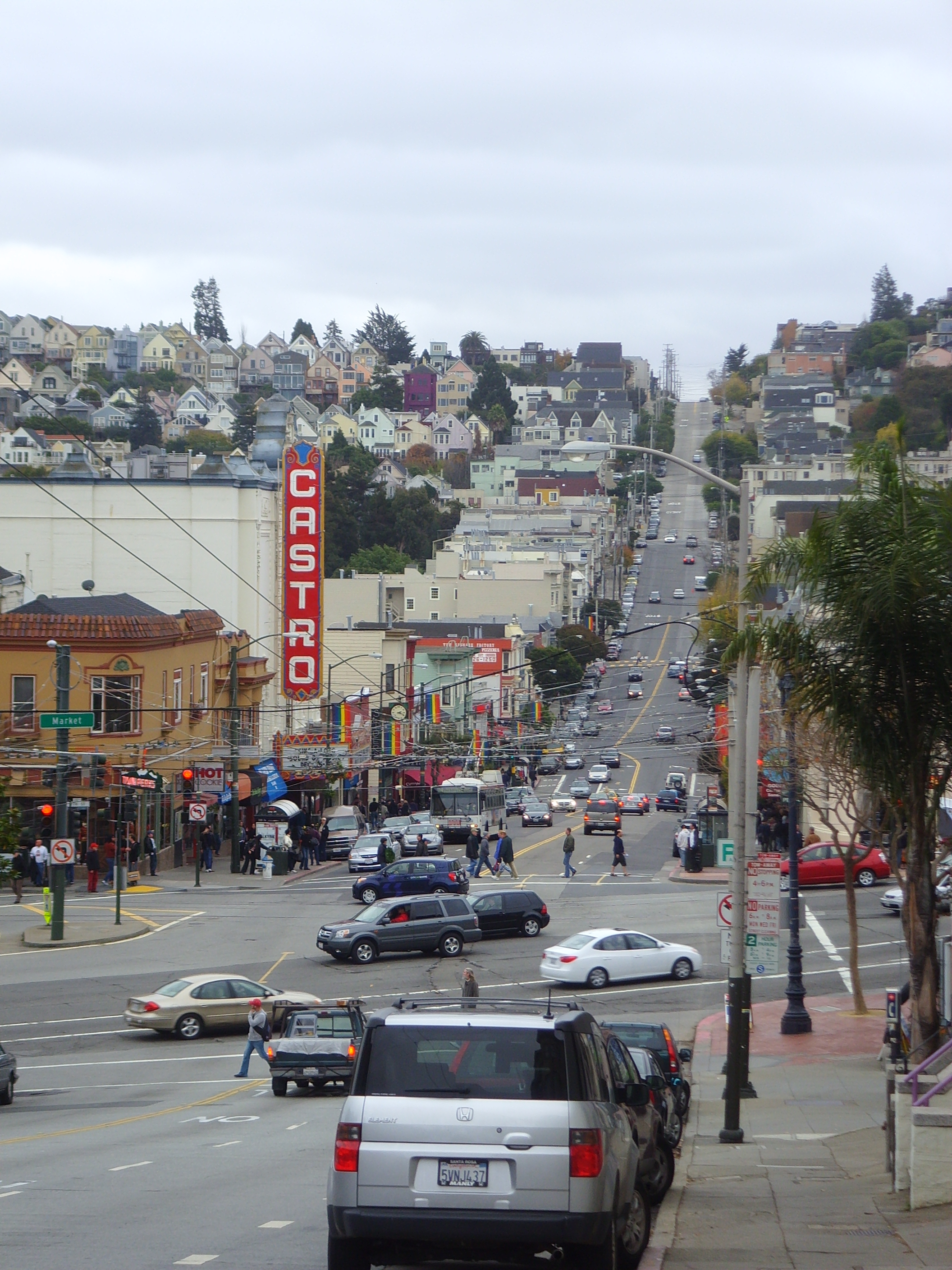
San Francisco's Castro neighborhood, where Sylvester regularly performed and socialized among the LGBT community. Biographer Joshua Gamson described him as Castro's "undisputed First Lady".

Sylvester's fame increased following the release of his solo album, and he was employed to perform regularly at The Elephant Walk gay bar in the Castro, an area of San Francisco known as a gay village. He became a friend of Harvey Milk—known locally as the "Mayor of Castro Street"—who was the first openly gay man to be elected to public office in California, and performed at Milk's birthday party that year. In the spring of 1978, Sylvester successfully auditioned for a cameo appearance in the film The Rose starring gay icon Bette Midler. In the film, he plays one of the drag queens singing along to Bob Seger's "Fire Down Below", in a single scene that was filmed in a run-down bar in downtown Los Angeles.

In September 1978, Sylvester released his second solo album, Step II. For this release, he was particularly influenced by the genre of dance music known as disco which was then becoming increasingly popular across the Western world. Disco was closely associated with the gay, Black, and Latino communities in the US and dominated by Black female artists such as Donna Summer, Gloria Gaynor, and Grace Jones, with Sylvester initially being unsure that it was a suitable genre for him to work in; he nevertheless recognized its increasing commercial potential.

During production of the album, Sylvester invited the musician Patrick Cowley to join his studio band, being impressed by Cowley's innovative techniques using synthesizers. The album landed Cowley a job as a back-up musician on Sylvester's subsequent worldwide tours, and the two started a close friendship and collaboration. Once again co-produced by Harvey Fuqua and released on Fuqua's Fantasy label, Step II contained two disco songs that were subsequently released as singles, "You Make Me Feel (Mighty Real)", written by James Wirrick, and "Dance (Disco Heat)", written by Eric Robinson.

Both singles proved commercial hits both domestically and abroad, topping the American dance chart and breaking into the US pop charts. The album itself was also a success, being certified gold, and was described by Rolling Stone magazine as being "as good as disco gets". In his history of disco, Shapiro described "You Make Me Feel (Mighty Real)" as Sylvester's "greatest record", "the cornerstone of gay disco", and "an epochal record in disco history". Shapiro noted that Sylvester's work brought together elements from both of the main strands of disco; the "gospel/R&B tradition" and the "mechanical, piston-pumping beats" tradition, but that in doing so he went "way beyond either". Shapiro expressed the view that "Sylvester propelled his falsetto far above his natural range into the ether and rode machine rhythms that raced toward escape velocity, creating a new sonic lexicon powerful, camp, and otherworldly enough to articulate the exquisite bliss of disco's dance floor utopia".

In both August and December 1978, Sylvester visited London, England to promote his music; he proved hugely popular in the city, performing at a number of different nightclubs and being mobbed by fans. It was while in the city that he filmed the music video for "You Make Me Feel (Mighty Real)". Back in the US, Sylvester began to appear on television shows to advertise his music, appearing on Dinah!, American Bandstand, Don Kirshner's Rock Concert, and The Merv Griffin Show. He also undertook a series of tours across the country, opening for both the Commodores and Chaka Khan, and performing alongside the O'Jays, War, and L.T.D. As a result, he earned a number of awards and performed at several award ceremonies. Through this developing public presence, Sylvester, alongside other visibly queer performers such as the Village People, helped to solidify the connection between disco and homosexuality within the public imagination; this however furthered the anti-disco sentiment among rock music fans which would emerge as the Disco Sucks movement.

== Later life ==
=== 1979–1981: Stars, Sell My Soul, and Too Hot To Sleep ===
Stars, in which Mr. S. stretches his two best tricks—for thrills, a supernal burst of sound too sweet for a shriek that he unlooses well above his normal falsetto range; for romance, a transported croon.

— Christgau's Record Guide: Rock Albums of the Seventies (1981)

Sylvester followed the success of Step II with an album entitled Stars. Consisting of four love songs, the title track – released as a single in January 1979 – had been written by Cowley, and Sylvester would proceed to tell the press that it was his first completely disco album, but that it would also probably be his last. He premiered the album's four tracks on March 11, 1979, at a sold-out show in the San Francisco War Memorial Opera House. The performance was attended by a number of senior figures in local government, and halfway through, Mayor Dianne Feinstein sent her aide, Harry Britt, to award Sylvester with the key to the city and proclaim March 11 to be "Sylvester Day". The Opera House gig was recorded, and subsequently released as a live album, Living Proof. Sylvester thought very highly of the album, but it did not sell well. A single released from this album, "Can't Stop Dancing", was a hit in the disco clubs but not in the pop music charts.

Despite increasing mainstream success, Sylvester continued to reaffirm his connection to the gay community of San Francisco, performing at the main stage at the 1979 Gay Freedom Day parade. Further, during his summer 1979 tour of the UK, he performed at the London Gay Pride Festival in Hyde Park. That same year, Sylvester met the singer Jeanie Tracy through Harvey Fuqua, and they immediately became friends. Sylvester felt that Tracy, a large Black woman, would work well with his Two Tons O' Fun, and invited her to join his backing singers, which she proceeded to do. Subsequently, befriending the Tons, she would work for Sylvester for the rest of his life. The Tons themselves were convinced by Fuqua to produce their own self-titled album, from which came two dance chart hits, "Earth Can Be Just Like Heaven" and "Just Us"; as a result, they began to work less and less with Sylvester, only joining him on occasion for his live shows. In some interviews he would express bitterness at their departure, while in others he stressed that he had no bad feelings toward them.

"I think the media have built this disco thing up out of all proportions in my case and so while people may come to see me on the pretence of seeing a disco show, they soon realise that there is so much more to me."

— Sylvester on his move away from disco

In 1980, Sylvester also reached tabloid headlines after he was arrested on a visit to New York City, accused of being involved in the robbery of several rare coins. After three days of incarceration, he was released on a police bail of $30,000. Sylvester was never charged, and police later admitted their mistake after it was revealed that the real culprit had posed as Sylvester by signing cheques in his name. Returning to San Francisco after this event, it was here that Sylvester produced his next album for Fantasy Records, Sell My Soul. Largely avoiding disco after the genre had become unpopular following the much publicized Disco Sucks movement, Sell My Soul instead represented a selection of soul-inspired dance tracks. Recorded in two weeks, Sylvester worked largely with backing singers and musicians whom he was unfamiliar with, and regular collaborators Rhodes and Cowley were entirely absent. Reviews were generally poor, describing the album as being average in quality. The only disco song on the album, "I Need You", was released as a single, but fared poorly.

Sylvester's fifth and final album for Fantasy Records was Too Hot to Sleep, in which he once again eschewed disco for a series of groove soul tunes, ballads, and gospel-style tracks. Missing the Two Tons entirely, Tracy was instead accompanied by a new backing singer, Maurice "Mo" Long, and because the three of them had all grown up in the Church of God in Christ, they decided to refer to themselves as the "C.O.G.I.C. Singers". The album also featured a number of tracks in which Sylvester avoided his usual falsetto tones to sing in a baritone voice. The album sold poorly.

=== 1982–1986: Megatone Records ===
"Larger companies employ executives who sit behind their office desks, living off past achievements. We are small, we are free, and it's that freedom that makes me creative."

— Sylvester on Megatone Records

Both the Two Tons and Sylvester came to suspect that Fantasy Records had failed to pay them all of the money that they were owed from the sale of their records. Sylvester left Fantasy and in November 1982 he filed a lawsuit against them; it ultimately proved successful in establishing that the company had been withholding money from him totaling $218,112.50. Nevertheless, Fuqua proved unable to pay anything more than $20,000, meaning that Sylvester never saw the majority of the money that was legally owed to him. Sylvester grew to despise Fuqua, and forbade his friends from ever mentioning his name.

Closely associated with the now unpopular disco and having had no hit singles in the preceding few years, after leaving Fantasy, Sylvester was not a particular draw for major record labels. Recognizing this state of affairs, in 1982 Sylvester commented that "there's nothing worse than a fallen star" who still has "illusions" of their continuing fame. Rather than chasing major chart success, Sylvester wanted to focus on retaining creative control over his music. Hiring his former tour manager and longstanding friend Tim McKenna as his new manager, Sylvester decided to produce his next album with Megatone Records, a small San Francisco company that had been founded in 1981 by Patrick Cowley and Marty Blecman and which catered largely to the gay club scene. The result was All I Need (1982), on which James Wirrick had written most of the songs, which were dance-orientated and influenced by the new wave music then in vogue. Sylvester insisted that he include several ballads on the album, which featured cover art by Mark Amerika depicting Sylvester in ancient Egyptian garb.

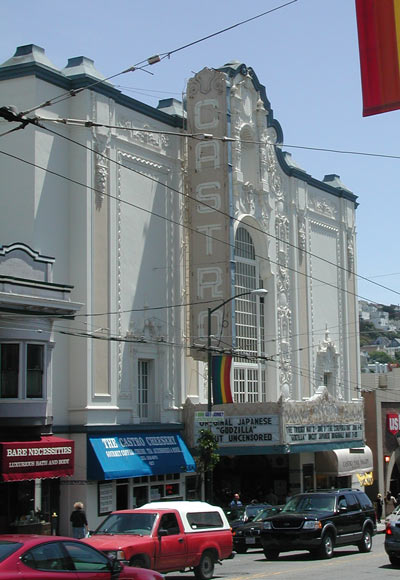
The Castro Theatre in San Francisco, where Sylvester performed his "One Night Only" retrospective

One of the best known Sylvester songs of this period was "Do Ya Wanna Funk", a Hi-NRG dance track co-written with Cowley which was released as a single in July 1982, topping the US dance charts and entering the pop charts in a number of countries across the world. Although he had continued working, Cowley was suffering from the recently discovered HIV/AIDS virus – at the time still referred to as "gay-related immune deficiency" (GRID) by American doctors – and was in a deteriorating physical condition. Sylvester continued touring, and it was while in London, preparing to perform at the Heaven superclub, that he learned of Cowley's death on November 12, 1982. He went onstage, informing the crowd of Cowley's passing and then sang "Do Ya Wanna Funk" in memory of him.

In 1983, Sylvester became a partner of Megatone Records. That year he also brought out his second album with the company, Call Me, but it was not a commercial success. Four songs from the album were released as singles, although only "Trouble in Paradise" entered the top 20 of the US dance charts; Sylvester later related that the song was his "AIDS message to San Francisco". Sylvester was emotionally moved by the HIV/AIDS epidemic, and began helping out at the Rita Rockett Lounge for patients of the disease at the San Francisco General Hospital as well as performing at various benefit concerts to raise money and awareness to combat the spread of the disease. In February 1984 he also performed a "One Night Only" retrospective of his work at the prestigious Castro Theatre. Sylvester still toured both domestically and in Europe, although he found that demand for his performances was decreasing, and that he was now playing to smaller venues and singing to a pre-recorded tape rather than to a live band as he had in the late 1970s.

His next album, entitled M-1015 (1984), was more frenetic and pumping than his previous releases, having embraced the recently developed genre of Hi-NRG, but it also included elements of electro and rap. The major figures behind the album had been Kessie and Morey Goldstein, and Sylvester himself had not written any of the tracks. The album also contained increasingly sexually explicit lyrics, in particular in the songs "How Do You Like Your Love" and "Sex". That year, he also entered into a relationship with an architect named Rick Cranmer, and together they moved into a new apartment in the hills, where Sylvester decorated his powder room with posters and memorabilia of Divine, the drag queen, actor and singer whom he had briefly known when they were in the Cockettes. In 1985, he fulfilled a lifelong ambition by working with the singer Aretha Franklin; he and Jeanie had been invited to provide backing vocals on Franklin's album Who's Zoomin' Who?.

Sylvester's final album, Mutual Attraction (1986), was produced by Megatone but licensed and released by Warner Bros. On the album, Sylvester had worked with a wide number of collaborators, and included new tracks alongside covers of songs by Stevie Wonder and George Gershwin. Reviews of the album were mixed, with many claiming that it was a poor release. One of the album's singles, "Someone Like You", proved more successful, reaching number one on the Billboard dance charts. Warner Bros booked him to appear on the New Year's Eve edition of The Late Show Starring Joan Rivers, during which Joan Rivers described him as a drag queen; visibly annoyed, he corrected her by stating that he was not a drag queen, proclaiming simply "I'm Sylvester!" The appearance was also notable for Sylvester publicly declaring his relationship with Rick Cranmer despite the fact that Cranmer's family were largely unaware of either the liaison or his sexuality.

=== 1986–1988: Final years and death ===
In 1985, Sylvester's boyfriend, Rick Cranmer, became aware that he had become infected with HIV. With no known medical cure, his health deteriorated rapidly and he died September 7, 1987. Sylvester was devastated, and although recognizing that he too was probably infected, he refused to have his blood tested, only noticing the virus' first symptoms when he developed a persistent cough. Beginning work on an album that would remain unfinished, he moved into a new apartment on Collingwood Street in the Castro, and tried his best to continue performing in the Bay Area, even though he became too ill to undertake a full tour. Eventually diagnosed with AIDS, he was hospitalized for sinus surgery in late 1987, and upon returning to his apartment, he began to be cared for by his mother and Tracy, before being hospitalized again in May 1988, this time with pneumocystis pneumonia. Returning to his flat, he gave away many of his treasured possessions and wrote his will.

Having lost a lot of weight and unable to walk easily, he attended the Castro's 1988 Gay Freedom Parade in a wheelchair, being pushed along by McKenna in front of the People with AIDS banner; along Market Street, assembled crowds shouted out his name as he passed. The subsequent 1988 Castro Street Fair was named "A Tribute to Sylvester", and although he was too ill to attend, crowds chanted his name to such an extent that he was able to hear them from his bedroom. He appeared at the Dreamland nightclub (now The Vendry), watching the dancers from the second floor balcony, and DJ Steve Fabus put together an impromptu set of Sylvester songs. When he waved weakly goodbye, the dance floor erupted in stomping and shouting "We love you!" He continued to give interviews to the media, being open about the fact that he was dying of AIDS, and sought in particular to highlight the impact that the disease was having in the African-American community. In an interview with the NME, he stated, "I don't believe that AIDS is the wrath of God. People have a tendency to blame everything on God."

For Thanksgiving 1988, his family spent the holiday with him, although he had developed neuropathy and was increasingly bed-ridden and reliant on morphine. He died in his bed on December 16, 1988, at the age of 41. Sylvester had planned his own funeral, insisting that he be dressed in a red kimono and placed in an open-top coffin for the mourners to see, with his friend Yvette Flunder doing his corpse's makeup. He wanted Tracy to sing at his funeral, accompanied by choirs and many flowers. The whole affair took place in his church, the Love Center, with a sermon being provided by Rev. Walter Hawkins. The event was packed, with standing room only, and the coffin was subsequently taken and buried at his family's plot in Inglewood Park Cemetery. An album titled Immortal was posthumously released; it contained Sylvester's final studio recordings and was compiled by Marty Blecman.

== Personal life ==
Sylvester has been described as having a "flamboyant and colourful" public persona, wearing both male and female gendered clothes as part of his attire, with his biographer Joshua Gamson opining that for Sylvester, "gender was an everyday choice". Sylvester described his public persona as "an extension of me, the real me". Sylvester's friend and publicist Sharon Davis described him as "a quiet, often thoughtful, caring guy, who put others before himself, and was generous to a fault, having little regard for money. His policy was you only live once, so enjoy!" She also noted that he could be "unpredictable", being "stubborn as a mule" and "always speak[ing] his mind". Sylvester was considered to be a prima donna by members of the Hot Band and could be temperamental and difficult with those with whom he worked. He found it difficult saving the money that he earned, instead spending it as soon as he obtained it, both on himself and on his lovers, friends, and family.

"Perhaps Sylvester suffered the curse of the control queen and the narcissist: he chose controllable and adoring partners, only to find out that they were not self-possessed enough to meet him where he wanted to be met. But his was also the curse of the generous and gentle-hearted. He used the nurturing talents that Letha and JuJu gave him, teaching people ... that they, too, were loved and fabulous. When he succeeded, they were ready to go out on their own. You ask one person and he'll say that Sylvester just wanted a worshipful housewife; ask another and he'll tell you that Sylvester wanted to give his soul away to someone extraordinary enough to handle it. They are both right, no doubt."

— Biographer Joshua Gamson, 2005

Sylvester was openly gay, with Gamson noting that he tended to enter into relationships with men who were "white, self-doubting and effeminate". In 1978, he entered into a relationship with a young white model named John Maley; Sylvester later devoted the song "Can't Forget the Love" from his Too Hot to Sleep album to his young lover. Maley ended the relationship to move to Los Angeles, later recollecting that Sylvester "was a lovely man, and I owe him a lot".

In 1981, Sylvester entered into a relationship with a slim brunette from Deep River, Connecticut, named Michael Rayner, but unlike his predecessors, he did not move into Sylvester's house. Their partnership ended when Rayner admitted that he had not fallen completely in love with Sylvester. Sylvester's next major relationship was with Tom Daniels, a hairdresser whom he met in 1982, but their romance ended after six months when Daniels discovered that Sylvester had been having sex with other men while on tour. The singer's final partner, the architect Rick Cranmer, was a six-foot two blond, and the duo moved into a house together in the hills. Cranmer died of AIDS-related complications in 1987, the year before Sylvester succumbed to the virus.

As an openly gay man throughout his career, Sylvester came to be seen as a spokesman for the gay community. He informed a journalist that "I realize that gay people have put me on a pedestal and I love it. After all, of all the oppressed minorities, they just have to be the most oppressed. They have all the hassles of finding something or someone to identify with – and they chose me. I like being around gay people and they've proven to be some of my closest friends and most loyal audiences."

Elsewhere, he nevertheless remarked that he felt his career had "transcended the gay movement. I mean, my sexuality has nothing to do with my music. When I'm fucking I'm not thinking about singing and vice versa." He was openly critical of what he perceived as divisive tendencies within the gay community itself, noting that "I get this conformist shit from queens all the time. They always want to read me. They always want me to do it their way. I am not going to conform to the gay lifestyle as they see it and that's for sure". He was particularly critical of "clones" – gay men who dressed alike with boots, boot-cut jeans, checked shirts and handlebar mustaches – stating that all too often they judged those gay people who were flamboyant or extravagant.

Davis characterized Sylvester as an "absolute perfectionist". He was very self-conscious about his physical appearance, and when he obtained enough money from the successful Step II album, he spent part of it on cosmetic surgery to remove a bump on his nose, inject silicone into his cheeks, and have cosmetic work done on his teeth. He would also insist that all pictures of himself were meticulously airbrushed.

Sylvester was born into and raised in the Pentecostal movement of Christianity and attended church throughout his life. He often compared the ecstatic feelings that accompanied his onstage performances with the feelings experienced in a gospel choir in a Pentecostal church. When performances reached a certain level of heightened emotion, he would comment that "we had service". In later life, he joined the Love Center Church in East Oakland, a ministry founded by the preacher and former gospel singer Walter Hawkins in the 1970s. He had been introduced to the church by Jeanie Tracy in the 1980s and would soon become a regular churchgoer, enjoying the place's welcoming attitude towards societal outcasts. Sylvester requested that his funeral be undertaken by the ministry at the Love Center.

== Legacy ==
"If there was one artist ... who truly exemplified disco's new language of ecstasy it was Sylvester, whose use of his gospel trained falsetto in the service of gay desire and pleasure is surely the most radical rewrite of pop's lingua franca ever attempted."

— Peter Shapiro, 2005

During the late 1970s, Sylvester gained the moniker of the "Queen of Disco", a term that continued to be given to the singer into the 21st century. The English journalist Stephen Brogan later described him as "a star who shined brightly. He only happened once. He was a radical and a visionary in terms of queerness, music and race."

Reynaldo Anderson of Harris-Stowe State University described Sylvester's influence upon disco and subsequent electronic dance music as "incalculable". He added that Sylvester's songs "Dance (Disco Heat)", "You Make Me Feel (Mighty Real)", and "Do You Wanna Funk" represented "anthems of disco aficionados for a generation", while also expressing the view that Sylvester himself "personified the excesses of the 1970s and the experimentation that characterized [the decade's] changing social norms" within the United States.

Shapiro cited Sylvester alongside other artists such as Wendy Carlos, Throbbing Gristle, and Terre Thaemlitz as an individual who used electronic music as "a vehicle to express sexual transgression". In her study of the use of falsetto in disco, Anne-Lise François believed that Sylvester's style of singing "makes the point most obviously about falsetto as a gender-bending device". The cultural studies scholar Tim Lawrence stated that Sylvester embodied "the [disco] movement's gay roots", and in doing could be contrasted with John Travolta, who embodied "its commercialization and suburbanization". The two figures thus reflected a divide between the gay and straight interpretations and presentations of disco music. Layli Philips and Marla R. Stewart compared Sylvester to both Willi Ninja and RuPaul as pop icons who exhibited "male femininity" within the "Black male diva (or 'queen') tradition".

In his will, Sylvester had declared that royalties from the future sale of this music be devoted to two HIV/AIDS charities, Project Open Hand and the AIDS Emergency Fund. Although Sylvester died deeply in debt as a result of taking advances on his royalties, by the early 1990s this debt had been paid off, and a balance had begun to build up. Roger Gross, the attorney to Sylvester's manager and the openly gay lawyer who helped him draw up his will, petitioned the probate court to designate the charities as the beneficiaries of Sylvester's will. The proceeds of $140,000 in accrued royalties were split between the two groups, and they will continue to be paid the royalties in the future.

In September 2005, Sylvester was one of three artists inducted into the Dance Music Hall of Fame, alongside Chic and Gloria Gaynor. In December 2016, Billboard magazine ranked him as the 59th most successful dance artist of all-time. In 2023, Rolling Stone ranked Sylvester at number 169 on its list of the 200 Greatest Singers of All Time.

In 2019, "You Make Me Feel (Mighty Real)" was selected by the Library of Congress for preservation in the National Recording Registry for being "culturally, historically, or aesthetically significant". In 2026, the same song was included in Esquire's "25 Most American Songs of All Time".

=== Biographies, documentaries, and musicals ===
A biography of Sylvester was authored by Gamson and published in 2005. Writing for the London-based LGBT magazine Beige: The Provocative Cultural Quarterly, Stephen Brogan expressed his opinion that while Gamson's biography was well researched, it had a fragmented structure and as such was "not a joy to read". Entertainment Weekly called the book "playful and furious" and awarded it a B+ rating, The Boston Globe suggested that it was "as engaging as the times it so energetically resurrects", and The San Francisco Chronicle reported that the author "carefully paints the shifting social tapestry into his subject's life story without ever taking Sylvester out of the foreground".

The Fabulous Sylvester won the 2006 Stonewall Book Award for nonfiction. In 2015, Sylvester's publicist Sharon Davis published memoirs of the time that she spent with Sylvester, noting that she planned for it to appear in 2013 to mark the 25th anniversary of Sylvester's death.

In 2010, the TV series Unsung aired an episode on Sylvester, that was later made available through YouTube. Sylvester: Mighty Real, an official feature-length documentary on the life and career of Sylvester, entered production; it featured interviews with members of Sylvester's family and other artists and musicians who have been inspired by, but by 2012 the film's progress had halted.

In August 2014, an Off-Broadway musical titled Mighty Real: A Fabulous Sylvester Musical opened at Theatre At St. Clement's in New York City. It was co-directed by Kendrell Bowman and Anthony Wayne, the latter of whom also performed as the titular character. Wayne stated that he discovered Sylvester's story through a television documentary, and was subsequently "inspired by his drive to be who he was regardless of what he went through", performing a concert of Sylvester's songs with friends Anastacia McCleskey and Jacqueline B. Arnold as the Two Tons o' Fun before deciding to begin work on the musical.

A laudatory review of the musical from The New York Times noted that Wayne "certainly has the bravado, the androgynous sex appeal and the piercing voice to emulate the original convincingly". The Huffington Post review noted that the musical largely avoided dealing with the decline in Sylvester's musical success during the 1980s, and that although " anyone seeking an exhaustively researched play-by-play of the star's life would be better off waiting for a documentary", the musical "succeeds as a collection of infectious performances by a truly gifted cast".

In 2014, Sylvester was one of the inaugural honorees in the Rainbow Honor Walk, a walk of fame in San Francisco's Castro neighborhood noting LGBTQ people who have "made significant contributions in their fields".

== Discography ==
=== Studio albums ===
Year	Album	Peak chart positions				Certifications	Record label
Year	Album	US	US R&B	AUS	CAN	Certifications	Record label
1973	Sylvester & the Hot Band^{[A]}	—	—	—	—		Blue Thumb
1973	Bazaar^{[A]}	—	—	—	—		Blue Thumb
1977	Sylvester	—	—	—	—		Fantasy
1978	Step II	28	7	74	59	RIAA: Gold	Fantasy
1979	Stars	63	27	—	59		Fantasy
1980	Sell My Soul	147	44	—	—		Fantasy/Honey
1981	Too Hot to Sleep	156	51	—	—		Fantasy/Honey
1982	All I Need	168	35	98	—		Megatone
1983	Call Me	—	—	—	—		Megatone
1984	M-1015	—	—	—	—		Megatone
1986	Mutual Attraction	164	46	—	—		Warner Bros./Megatone
"—" denotes a recording that did not chart or was not released in that territory.

- ^{A} Credited as Sylvester & the Hot Band.

=== Live albums ===
Year	Album	Peak chart positions		Record label
Year	Album	US	US R&B	Record label
1979	Living Proof	123	45	Fantasy

=== Compilation albums ===
Year	Album	Peak	Record label
Year	Album	UK	Record label
1979	Mighty Real	62	Fantasy
1983	Sylvester's Greatest Hits: Nonstop Dance Party	—	Fantasy
1988	The 12 X 12 Collection	—	Megatone
1989	The Original Hits	—	Fantasy
1989	Immortal	—	Megatone

=== Singles ===
Year	Single	Peak chart positions								Certifications	Album
Year	Single	US	US R&B	US Dan	AUS	CAN	IRE	NZ	UK	Certifications	Album
1973	"Southern Man"^{[A]}	—	—	—	—	—	—	—	—		Sylvester & the Hot Band
1973	"Down on Your Knees"^{[A]}	—	—	—	—	—	—	—	—		Bazaar
1977	"Over and Over"	—	—	18	—	—	—	—	—		Sylvester
1977	"Down, Down, Down"	—	—	18	—	—	—	—	—		Sylvester
1978	"Dance (Disco Heat)"	19	4	1	—	26	—	26	29		Step II
1978	"You Make Me Feel (Mighty Real)"	36	20	1	16	54	11	—	8	BPI: Silver	Step II
1979	"I (Who Have Nothing)"	40	27	4	—	86	23	—	46		Stars
1979	"Stars"	—	—	4	—	—	—	—	47		Stars
1979	"Body Strong"	—	—	4	—	—	—	—	—		Stars
1979	"Can't Stop Dancing"	—	43	2	—	—	—	—	—		Living Proof
1979	"In My Fantasy (I Want You, I Need You)"	—	—	2	—	—	—	—	—		Living Proof
1980	"You Are My Friend"	—	30	—	—	—	—	—	—		Living Proof
1980	"I Need You"	—	—	6	—	—	—	—	—		Sell My Soul
1980	"Sell My Soul"	—	—	6	—	—	—	—	—		Sell My Soul
1980	"Fever"	—	—	6	—	—	—	—	—		Sell My Soul
1981	"Here Is My Love"	—	44	20	—	—	—	—	—		Too Hot to Sleep
1981	"Give It Up (Don't Make Me Wait)" (with Jeanie Tracy)	—	—	20	—	—	—	—	—		Too Hot to Sleep
1981	"Magic Number" (with Herbie Hancock)	—	59	9	—	—	—	—	—		Magic Windows
1982	"Do Ya Wanna Funk" (with Patrick Cowley)	—	—	4	24	—	—	46	32		All I Need
1982	"All I Need"	—	67	3	—	—	—	—	—		All I Need
1982	"Don't Stop"	—	—	3	—	—	—	—	77		All I Need
1983	"Tell Me"	—	—	49	—	—	—	—	—		All I Need
1983	"Band of Gold"	—	—	18	—	—	—	—	67		Call Me
1983	"Too Late"	—	68	16	—	—	—	—	—		Call Me
1983	"Trouble in Paradise"	—	—	16	—	—	—	—	—		Call Me
1984	"Call Me"	—	—	57	—	—	—	—	—		Call Me
1984	"Good Feelin'"	—	—	57	—	—	—	—	—		Call Me
1984	"Stargazing" (with Earlene Bentley)	—	—	—	—	—	—	—	—		—N/a
1984	"Menergy"	—	—	—	—	—	—	—	—		—N/a
1984	"Rock the Box"	—	—	25	—	—	—	34	88		M-1015
1985	"Take Me to Heaven"	—	—	6	—	—	—	45	100		M-1015
1985	"Sex"	—	—	6	—	—	—	—	—		M-1015
1986	"Living for the City"	—	—	2	—	—	—	—	—		Mutual Attraction
1986	"Someone Like You"	—	19	1	—	—	—	—	—		Mutual Attraction
1987	"Mutual Attraction"	—	—	10	—	—	—	—	—		Mutual Attraction
1987	"Sooner or Later"	—	—	32	—	—	—	—	—		Mutual Attraction
1988	"Do You Wanna Funk (Housey Housey Mix)" (with Patrick Cowley)	—	—	—	—	—	—	—	97		—N/a
2013	"You Make Me Feel (Mighty Real) (The Remixes)"	—	—	46	—	—	—	—	—		—N/a
"—" denotes a recording that did not chart or was not released in that territory.

- ^{A} Credited as Sylvester & the Hot Band.

== See also ==
- List of number-one dance hits (United States)
- List of artists who reached number one on the US Dance chart
