= You Make Me Feel (Mighty Real) =

1978 single by Sylvester

Single by Sylvester

from the album Step II
- B-side: "Grateful"
- Released: October 1978 (US)
- Recorded: 1977
- Genre: Disco; hi-NRG
- Length: 6:40 (album version); 3:35 (single version)
- Label: Fantasy
- Songwriters: James Wirrick; Sylvester James
- Producers: Harvey Fuqua; Sylvester

Sylvester singles chronology
"Dance (Disco Heat)" (1978)	"You Make Me Feel (Mighty Real)" (1978)	"I (Who Have Nothing)" (1979)

Music video
- "You Make Me Feel (Mighty Real)" on YouTube

"You Make Me Feel (Mighty Real)" is a song by American disco/R&B singer Sylvester. It was written by James Wirrick and Sylvester, produced by Harvey Fuqua and Sylvester, and released by Fantasy Records as the second single from the singer's fourth album, Step II (1978). The song was already a largely popular dance club hit in 1978, as the B-side of his previous single "Dance (Disco Heat)", before it was officially being released in December. It rose to the number one position on the US Billboard Dance Club Songs chart. Music critic Robert Christgau has said the song is "one of those surges of sustained, stylized energy that is disco's great gift to pop music".

In 2003, Q Magazine included "You Make Me Feel (Mighty Real)" in their list of the "1001 Best Songs Ever". In 2019, the song was selected by the Library of Congress for preservation in the National Recording Registry for being "culturally, historically, or aesthetically significant". In 2023 and 2025, Billboard magazine ranked it among the "500 Best Pop Songs of All Time" and "The 100 Best Dance Songs of All Time".

== Origins ==
The song was originally recorded as a mid-tempo piano-driven gospel song; however, after producer Patrick Cowley saw a rehearsal of the song at San Francisco's City Club, he offered to remix the song. The result was one of the pioneering disco records using some electronic instrumentation and effects, following closely on "I Feel Love" by Donna Summer which heavily used electronic instrumentation ahead of its time. These 1970s songs using electronic instrumentation would have an influence on 1980s and 1990s dance music, which in turn, would have an influence on dance music in the next century.

== Chart performance ==
The song was Sylvester's first top 10 hit in the United Kingdom, where it peaked at No. 8 on the UK Singles Chart in October 1978. In Sylvester's home country, the single was his second top 40 hit, peaking at No. 36 on the US Billboard Hot 100 chart in February 1979. The song also reached No. 20 on the Billboard Hot Soul Singles chart. A 12" single was released in 1978, with "Dance (Disco Heat)" as the A-side and "You Make Me Feel (Mighty Real)" as the B-side, and these two extended dance mixes proved to be very popular in dance clubs at the time. The two songs held down the top spot on the Billboard Dance/Disco chart for six weeks in August and September 1978. These two songs helped to establish Sylvester's career as a noted disco and dance music performer, both in the US and abroad.

== Impact and legacy ==
In 1994, French DJ Laurent Garnier named "You Make Me Feel (Mighty Real)" one of his favourites of all time, saying, "Amazing powerful hi-NRG. He's got a wicked voice — the vocals are beautiful, more than anything else he's done. I heard first in Italy around the time of Donna Summer's 'I Feel Love'." In October 2000, VH1 ranked it No. 14 in their list of "100 Greatest Dance Songs". In 2003, Q Magazine ranked it No. 677 in their list of the "1001 Best Songs Ever". In 2018, Pitchfork Media featured the song in their list of "50 Songs That Define the Last 50 Years of LGBTQ+ Pride". In 2019, the song was selected by the Library of Congress for preservation in the National Recording Registry for being "culturally, historically, or aesthetically significant". Same year, American DJ and producer Kevin Saunderson ranked it among "The 10 Best Disco Records of All Time", adding, "Sylvester's voice was so different – he has this range that was very unique as a male vocalist at that time. Kind of reminds you of Curtis Mayfield. Also the perfect vocal to compliment that track. It really bought chills to me when I heard this record."

In 2020, Daily Mirror ranked "You Make Me Feel (Mighty Real)" No. 13 in their "Top 50 Happiest Songs Ever" list. In 2021, Rolling Stone included it in their list of "500 Best Songs of All Time" at No. 399. In 2022, they ranked it No. 39 in their list of "200 Greatest Dance Songs of All Time". The same year, Time Out ranked it No. 8 in their list of "The 50 Best Gay Songs to Celebrate Pride All Year Long". In October 2023, Billboard ranked "You Make Me Feel (Mighty Real)" No. 428 in their "Best Pop Songs of All Time". The magazine praised its "magic moment"; "In the song‘s intro, as the song’s main hook starts to gather steam, a laser synth sound rises from out of nowhere, as if the song’s about to zoom off into outer space. And then it does." In 2024, Forbes ranked it No. 13 in their list of "The 30 Greatest Disco Songs of All Time". In March 2025, Billboard ranked it No. 17 in their list of "The 100 Best Dance Songs of All Time", while in June same year, it was ranked No. 2 in their "The 100 Greatest LGBTQ+ Anthems of All Time". In 2026, the song was included in Esquire's "25 Most American Songs of All Time".

== Charts ==
=== Weekly charts ===
Chart (1978–1979)	Peak position
Australia (Kent Music Report)	16
Austria (Ö3 Austria Top 40)	14
Belgium (Ultratop 50 Flanders)	16
Canada Top Singles (RPM)	54
Canada Dance/Urban (RPM)	2
Ireland (IRMA)	11
Italy (Musica e dischi)	7
Netherlands (Dutch Top 40)	25
Netherlands (Single Top 100)	26
Sweden (Sverigetopplistan)	14
Switzerland (Schweizer Hitparade)	6
UK Singles (Official Charts)	8
US Billboard Hot 100	36
US Dance Club Songs (Billboard)	1
US Hot R&B/Hip-Hop Songs (Billboard)	20
West Germany (GfK Entertainment Charts)	35

Chart (1994)	Peak position
UK Club Chart (Music Week)	34
UK Dance (Official Charts)	16
UK Hip Hop/R&B (Official Charts)	31

=== Year-end charts ===
Chart (1979)	Rank
Australia (Kent Music Report)	92
UK Singles (OCC)	47

== Jimmy Somerville version ==
"You Make Me Feel (Mighty Real)"

Single by Jimmy Somerville

from the album Read My Lips
- B-side: "Remix"
- Released: 1 January 1990
- Genre: Hi-NRG; synth-pop
- Length: 3:57
- Songwriters: James Wirrick; Sylvester
- Producer: Stephen Hague

Jimmy Somerville singles chronology
"Comment te dire adieu" (1989)	"You Make Me Feel (Mighty Real)" (1990)	"Read My Lips (Enough Is Enough)" (1990)

Music video
- "You Make Me Feel (Mighty Real)" on YouTube

British singer Jimmy Somerville, formerly of the bands Bronski Beat and Communards, released a cover of "You Make Me Feel (Mighty Real)" on 1 January 1990. His version of the song was produced by Stephen Hague and also received substantial club play, peaking at number five on the UK Singles Chart on 13 January. To date, this is the highest-charting version of the song in the UK. Somerville's cover of this song appears on his first solo album, Read My Lips (1989). Steve McLean directed the song's accompanying music video.

=== Background ===
Somerville told in a 1990 interview with Billboard magazine, that the track "was originally released during a period of time when the gay community was successful in creating positive visibility." He noted further, "And then AIDS created a political backlash. I wanted to bring this song forward as a means of picking up these pieces of history and contributing to bringing out a positive image of gay men." Having already covered two other '70s classics; "Don't Leave Me This Way" and "Never Can Say Goodbye", Somerville said he was trying to "reclaim what originally belonged to the gay community." He added, "During the '70s, we had all of these gay men expressing their emotions by writing music, and then using women vocalists as a front. We can now front these songs ourselves. It's an important thing to do. The problem is that so few people are willing to jeopardize record sales in order to be the honest and true people they really are."

=== Critical reception ===
Bill Coleman from Billboard magazine described the song as a "unashamedly hi-NRG/pop cover", noting that it marked Somerville's debut as a solo singer. Pan-European magazine Music & Media wrote that the song is "an obvious choice for Somerville" and added further that he performs it with "such raw enthusiasm that his version is easily as good as the original. The basic difference is that the backing is tighter and cleaner-a punchy brass riff has been added and there is a video (that mixes fun and gay politics to good effect)." In his review of the song, David Giles from Music Week stated that the singer "makes a very fine job at it." To Tim Southwell of Record Mirror, this song was "more disco-pop Europa-style", but considered it "somewhat tepid compared to Somerville's duet with June Miles-Kingston "Comment te dire adieu".

=== Music video ===
A music video was produced to promote the single, directed by Steve McLean. It features Somerville, backed by dancers, performing the song at a planet in front of volcanic craters. The video also features archive footage of Harvey Milk and Sylvester, as well as astronauts. The video was later made available on YouTube in 2017 and had generated more than 8 million views as of August 2025.

=== Charts ===
==== Weekly charts ====
Chart (1990)	Peak position
Australia (ARIA)	76
Belgium (Ultratop 50 Flanders)	15
Europe (Eurochart Hot 100)	15
Europe (European Airplay Top 50)	5
France (SNEP)	7
Ireland (IRMA)	2
Israel (Israeli Singles Chart)	1
Luxembourg (Radio Luxembourg)	2
Netherlands (Single Top 100)	49
UK Singles (Official Charts)	5
US Billboard Hot 100	87
US Dance Club Songs (Billboard)	34
US Cash Box Top 100	81
West Germany (GfK)	22

==== Year-end charts ====
Chart (1990)	Position
Belgium (Ultratop Flanders)	74
France	65

=== Certifications and sales ===
In France, the single reportedly sold at least 100,000 copies.

== Byron Stingily version ==
"You Make Me Feel (Mighty Real)"

Single by Byron Stingily

from the album The Purist
- B-side: "Remix"
- Released: 1998
- Genre: House
- Length: 3:40
- Label: Club Tools
- Songwriters: James Wirrick; Sylvester

Byron Stingily singles chronology
"Get Up (Everybody)" (1997)	"You Make Me Feel (Mighty Real)" (1998)	"Testify" (1998)

Music video
- "You Make Me Feel (Mighty Real)" on YouTube

Chicago-born house music singer Byron Stingily, formerly of the band Ten City, recorded a cover of "You Make Me Feel (Mighty Real)" in 1997. Like Sylvester's original recording, Stingily's cover version of "You Make Me Feel (Mighty Real)" (produced by UK music producer Damien Mendis) went to number-one on the American Billboard dance chart, where it spent one week atop the chart in March 1998. Although there have been instances where the same song, recorded by two different artists, has reached #1 on the Billboard Hot Dance Club Play chart ("Don't Leave Me This Way" first by Thelma Houston in 1976 and then the Communards with Sarah Jane Morris in 1986 is one example), it is still a fairly rare occurrence. This version also reached number 13 in the UK and number 25 in Italy. In 1998, it was featured on Stingily's debut album, The Purist.

=== Critical reception ===
Larry Flick from Billboard magazine wrote that "[Stingily] bravely takes on Sylvester's disco classic and infuses a startling combination of pulpit-pounding preaching and hip-grinding sexuality." He remarked, "His falsetto has never sounded so limber and soulful, and the track percolates with equal parts retro reverence and modern flair. Stingily has recently burst into pop prominence in the UK and Europe with this winning effort. What a treat it would be to see him enjoy comparable success in his home territory." Pan-European magazine Music & Media felt the cover "stays close to the original (sampled here), but doesn't sound at all dated." A reviewer from Music Week gave it four out of five, concluding, "The falsetto house king's cover of the Sylvester disco classic hits all the right (high) notes, and could see chart success." A reviewer from Vibe noted that "it's deliciously ironic that the defining moment in Byron Stingily's solo debut, The Purist, occurs during the climax of Sylvester's evergreen". The magazine added that Stingily "whips through a vamp that eerily duplicates the late disco belter's primal intensity."

=== Charts ===
Chart (1998)	Peak position
Europe (Eurochart Hot 100)	47
France (SNEP)	97
Italy (Musica e dischi)	25
Scotland (OCC)	17
UK Singles (Official Charts)	13
UK Dance (OCC)	1
US Hot Dance Club Songs (Billboard)	1

== Other notable versions ==
In 1991, actress-comedian Sandra Bernhard recorded her own version of the single, which is a tribute to Sylvester, on her album Excuses for Bad Behavior (Part One). A series of 12" remix singles was released in 1994 by Epic Records' 550 Music imprint, who also signed Bernhard and picked up her album for a major push that same year. It peaked at #13 on the Billboard Hot Dance Club Play chart, and #86 on the UK Singles Chart in late 1994.

== Appearances in other media ==
- The song was used for Danny DeVito's character's Officer Roy Goodbody's strip dance routine in the 2004 Friends season 10 episode "The One Where The Stripper Cries".
- The song was featured in a 2017 Candy Crush commercial. Beginning in June 2021, it was also used in an advertisement for the Paco Rabanne cologne PHANTOM.
- The song is featured on the 2021 dance rhythm game Just Dance 2022.
- The song was used during a "Lip Sync for Your Life" between Bob the Drag Queen and Derrick Barry in the 2016 8th season episode "RuPaul Book Ball" of RuPaul's Drag Race.
- The song was used as the closing theme of the 1983 pilot for the 1984 NBC game show, Hot Potato.
- In May 2022, a remixed version was released by Solardo and Comanavago.
- In October 2025, the song was used in a Starbucks commercial for the return of the pumpkin spice latte
