= Dance (Disco Heat) =

Single by Sylvester

from the album Step II
- B-side: "Was It Something That I Said"
- Released: August 1978
- Recorded: March 1978
- Genre: Disco, hi-NRG
- Length: 5:46
- Label: Fantasy
- Songwriter: Eric Robinson: Victor Orsborn
- Producer: Sylvester: Harvey Fuqua

Sylvester singles chronology
"Over and Over" (1977)	"Dance (Disco Heat)" (1978)	"You Make Me Feel (Mighty Real)" (1978)

"Dance (Disco Heat)" is a song by American singer Sylvester. The song appears on his 1978 album Step II and features backing vocals by Two Tons O' Fun.

== Chart performance ==
The song was Sylvester's first Top 40 hit in the United States, where it peaked at #19 on the Billboard Hot 100 chart in the fall of 1978, it also reached #29 on the UK Singles Chart. A 12" single was released in 1978, with "Dance (Disco Heat)" as the A-side and "You Make Me Feel (Mighty Real)" as the B-side, and these two extended dance mixes proved to be very popular in the dance clubs at the time. The two songs held down the top spot on the Billboard Dance/Disco chart for six weeks in August and September of that year and helped to establish Sylvester's career as a noted disco and dance music performer, both in the U.S. and abroad.
