= Harvey Fuqua =

American R&B singer and record producer (1929–2010)

- Fuqua in 2000

Background information
- Born: July 27, 1929; Louisville, Kentucky, U.S.
- Died: July 6, 2010 (aged 80) Detroit, Michigan, U.S.
- Genres: R&B; doo-wop; soul
- Occupations: Singer, songwriter, record producer, record label executive
- Instrument: Vocals
- Years active: 1951–2000
- Labels: Chess; Motown; RCA; Fantasy

Harvey Fuqua (/ˈfjuːkwə/ FEW-kwə; July 27, 1929 – July 6, 2010) was an American R&B singer, songwriter, record producer, and record label executive.

Fuqua founded the seminal R&B/doo-wop group the Moonglows in the 1950s. He is notable as one of the key figures in the development of the Motown label in Detroit, Michigan. His group gave Marvin Gaye a start in his music career. Fuqua and his wife at the time, Gwen Gordy, distributed the first Motown hit single, Barrett Strong's "Money (That's What I Want)", on their record label, Anna Records. Fuqua later sold Anna Records to Gwen's brother Berry Gordy and became a songwriter and executive at Motown.

== Biography ==
Fuqua was born in Louisville, Kentucky, United States. He was the nephew of Charlie Fuqua of the Ink Spots. In 1951, with Bobby Lester, Alexander Graves and Prentiss Barnes, he formed a vocal group, the Crazy Sounds, in Louisville, later moving with other members of the group to Cleveland, Ohio. There they were taken under the wing of disc jockey Alan Freed, who renamed them the Moonglows, after his own nickname, "Moondog". The Moonglows' first releases were for Freed's Champagne label in 1953. They recorded for the Chance label in Chicago, before signing with Chess Records in 1954. Their single "Sincerely" reached number 1 on the Billboard R&B chart and number 20 on the Hot 100 in late 1954.

When recording for Chess Records, Fuqua initially shared lead vocals with Lester, but eventually asserted himself as the leader of the group. In 1957 he dismissed the other members and recruited a new group, previously known as the Marquees, which included Marvin Gaye. This reconstituted lineup, billed as Harvey and the Moonglows, had immediate success with "Ten Commandments of Love" (number 22 on the Billboard Hot 100). Fuqua left the group in 1958. In 1959, he appeared under the name Harvey in the Alan Freed movie Go, Johnny, Go! singing "Don't Be Afraid To Love".

The Moonglows reunited temporarily in 1972. They were inducted into the Rock and Roll Hall of Fame in 2000.

While on the Chess label, Fuqua also sang duets with Etta James, having hits with "If I Can't Have You" (number 6 R&B, number 52 pop, 1960) and "Spoonful" (number 12 R&B, number 78 pop, 1961).

Fuqua left the Moonglows when Leonard Chess suggested that he join Anna Records in Detroit. At Anna Records, Fuqua began working with Anna Gordy, Billy Davis, Lamont Dozier and Johnny Bristol. He also introduced Marvin Gaye to Anna's brother, Berry Gordy, and married their sister Gwen Gordy. In 1961, he started his own labels, Tri-Phi Records and Harvey Records, whose acts included the Spinners, Junior Walker and Shorty Long. However, tiring of running a small independent label, Fuqua welcomed the opportunity to work at Motown; he was hired to head the label's Artist Development department and also worked as a producer for the company. Fuqua brought the Spinners and Johnny Bristol to Motown and co-produced several hits for Bristol. He was also responsible for bringing Tammi Terrell to the label and for suggesting and producing her duets with Marvin Gaye, including "Ain't No Mountain High Enough" and "Your Precious Love". In 1962, with the Five Quails, Fuqua had a minor hit with "Been a Long Time".

Around 1971, Fuqua left Motown and obtained a production deal with RCA Records, for which he had particular success with the band New Birth. He also discovered the disco pioneer Sylvester and "Two Tons o' Fun" (also known as the Weather Girls), producing Sylvester's hit singles "Dance (Disco Heat)" and "You Make Me Feel (Mighty Real)" in 1978 and his album Stars in 1979. He also served as Smokey Robinson's road manager. In 1982, he reunited with Marvin Gaye to produce the singer's Midnight Love album, which included the single "Sexual Healing". In 2000, he set up his own record company, Resurging Artist Records. He served as a trustee of the Rhythm and Blues Foundation. Fuqua co-wrote one of the most famous disco instrumentals, "K-Jee", recorded originally by The Nite-liters, from which New Birth was an offshoot band, and then Philadelphia session musicians MFSB for the movie Saturday Night Fever.

Fuqua resided in Las Vegas, Nevada, until his death from a heart attack in a hospital in Detroit on July 6, 2010.

== Solo singles discography ==
Year	A-side	B-side	Label and number	Notes
1959	"I Want Somebody"	"Da Da Goo Goo"	Chess 1713	
1959	"Twelve Months of the Year"	"Don't Be Afraid of Love"	Chess 1725	
1960	"Blue Skies"	"Ooh, Ouch, Stop"	Chess 1748	
1960	"If I Can't Have You"	"My Heart Cries"	Chess 1760	Duet with Etta James
1960	"Spoonful"	"It's a Cryin' Shame"	Chess 1771	Duet with Etta James
1961	"The First Time"	"Mama"	Chess 1781	
1962	"What Can You Do Now"	"Will I Do"	Harvey 121	Duet with Ann Bogan
1962	"Any Way You Wanta"	"She Loves Me So"	Tri-Phi 1017	
1963	"Memories of You"	"Come On and Answer Me"	Tri-Phi 1024	

== Charitable work ==
In March 1995, Fuqua and with his wife, Carolyne, incorporated the Foundation for the S.T.A.R.S., a nonprofit organization that reaches out to address some of the difficulties to underprivileged youth in the inner cities of America, with the belief that every dream should have the opportunity to be realized.

== Lawsuits ==
In November 1982, disco star Sylvester filed a lawsuit against Fuqua and Fantasy Records, which led to a judgment that the company had been withholding money from him, in the amount of $218,112.50. Fuqua was unable to pay more than $20,000, and thus Sylvester never received most of the money that was legally owed to him.
