= Get Up (Byron Stingily song) =

Single by Byron Stingily

from the album The Purist
- B-side: "Remix"
- Released: 1996
- Genre: House; R&B dance
- Length: 3:23
- Label: Nervous Records; Manifesto Records
- Songwriters: Byron Stingily; Paul Simpson; Zack Toms
- Producers: Paul Simpson; Zack Toms

Byron Stingily singles chronology
"Love You the Right Way" (1996)	"Get Up" (1996)	"You Make Me Feel (Mighty Real)" (1998)

Music video
- "Get Up" on YouTube

"Get Up" (also known as "Get Up (Everybody)") is a song by American house music singer-songwriter Byron Stingily, formerly of the band Ten City. A massive hit in the clubs, it was released in 1996 by Nervous Records and Manifesto Records, and samples Sylvester's 1978 song "Dance (Disco Heat)". "Get Up" was written by Stingily with the producers, Paul Simpson and Zack Toms. It reached number-one on the US Billboard Hot Dance Club Play chart in 1997 and was a top-20 hit in the UK, peaking at number 14, while going right up to number-one on the UK Dance Singles Chart in January 1997. The single has sold 300.000 units worldwide, and in 1998, it was included on Stingily's debut solo album, The Purist. In 2007, new remixes were released.

== Critical reception ==
The song received critical acclaim from music critics. Larry Flick from Billboard magazine felt the former Ten City frontman "continues to assert himself as a solo artist to be reckoned with this feel-good house kicker. His familiar, honey-coated falsetto has never sounded as sweet or authoritative." He added, "He stomps over rugged grooves [...] with the vigor of a preacher, while a choir chirps gleefully in the background. Already massive on key turntables in its test pressing, look for this to be one of the first mega dance-floor hits of the new year." British DJ Magazine gave it a score of five stars, calling it "fantastic". They also concluded, "The festive season number one... This is the rare kind of record that makes your heart race..."

A reviewer from Music Week gave it five out of five, adding, "The former Ten City vocalist deserved wider recognition with this pleasing R&B dance cut, which is already causing a storm in the clubs." Daisy & Havoc from the Record Mirror Dance Update also gave it five out of five and named it Tune of the Week, saying, "Definitely one of the hypes of the season this gentle thumping vocal number is very in-demand and deservedly so. Stingily's distinctive oh-so-high voice calls dancers to the floor and at the same time happily recalls times gone by (when most of us don't need asking twice...)." Charles Aaron from Spin wrote that Stingily "is the most buoyant and poignant singer/songwriter to come out of late-'80s house music, and he deserves a hit, already. 'Get Up', which goes to church and starts partying before the offertory prayer, could be the one."

== Music video ==
A music video was produced to promote the single, featuring Stingily performing with two female singers in an urban setting. In the beginning, they arrive in a helicopter, landing on a rooftop, before they start singing and dancing in the city surroundings. In between, they are also walking in the streets, handing out flyers to people. Later they enter a crowded nightclub, where Stingily and the women perform the song onstage in front of dancing people. The video was later made available on Nervous Records's official YouTube channel in 2013 and had generated two million views as of early 2026.

== Impact and legacy ==
Matthew Francey from Ministry of Sound named "Get Up" one of the biggest tunes in dance music in 2018, "The song's triumphant chorus is perfect for the sort of sunset sessions that have become ubiquitous from Croatia to Cabo, which has helped fuel "the track's return to prominence in the sets of DJs around the world. It was a classic then and it's a classic now, a certified banger, ready to go off."

== Track listing ==
- 12", US (1996)

A1. "Get Up" (Parade Mix) — 7:18
A2. "Get Up" (Overload Mix) — 7:17
B1. "Get Up" (Narcotic Mix) — 9:08
B2. "Get Up" (Narcotic Dub) — 8:12

- CD single, UK (1997)
1. "Get Up (Everybody)" (Radio Edit) — 3:27
2. "Get Up (Everybody)" (Parade Mix) — 7:40
3. "Get Up (Everybody)" (Red Nail Dub Mix) — 13:31
4. "Get Up (Everybody)" (Rhythm Masters Dub Mix) — 6:53
5. "Get Up (Everybody)" (Jules & Skins Vox Mix) — 5:44
- CD maxi, Sweden (1997)
1. "Get Up (Everybody)" (Radio Edit) — 3:23
2. "Get Up (Everybody)" (Peppermint Jam Allstar Mix) — 7:51
3. "Get Up (Everybody)" (Parade Mix) — 7:39
4. "Get Up (Everybody)" (Rhythm Masters Dub Mix) — 6:50
5. "Get Up (Everybody)" (Roger S. Narcotic Mix) — 9:05
- CD maxi, US (1996)
1. "Get Up" (Peppermint Jam Allstar Mix) — 7:50
2. "Get Up" (Analogic Club Mix) — 7:15
3. "Get Up" (Parade Mix) — 7:18
4. "Get Up" (Roger S. Narcotic Mix) — 8:58
5. "Get Up" (Mateo & Matos Mix) — 6:50
6. "Get Up" (Jinx's Groove) — 7:54
- CD maxi, Scandinavia (2007)
1. "Get Up (Everybody) 2007" (Radio Edit) — 3:13
2. "Get Up (Everybody) 2007" (Club Mix) — 7:26
3. "Get Up (Everybody) 2007" (Dub Mix) — 5:35

== Charts ==
=== Weekly charts ===
Chart (1997)	Peak position
Canada Dance/Urban (RPM)	3
Europe (Eurochart Hot 100)	29
France Airplay (SNEP)	94
Israel (Israeli Singles Chart)	21
Italy (Musica e dischi)	16
Scotland (OCC)	17
UK Singles (Official Charts)	14
UK Dance (OCC)	1
UK Club Chart (Music Week)	1
US Hot Dance Club Songs (Billboard)	1

=== Year-end charts ===
Chart (1997)	Position
Canada Dance/Urban (RPM)	39
UK Club Chart (Music Week)	74
