= Healing Tide =

Studio album by The War and Treaty
- Released: August 10, 2018
- Recorded: March 2018
- Genres: Americana; folk; rock
- Length: 45:26
- Labels: Strong World Entertainment, Thirty Tigers
- Producer: Buddy Miller

The War and Treaty chronology
Down to the River (2017)	Healing Tide (2018)	Hearts Town (2020)

Singles from Healing Tide
- 1. "Healing Tide" Released: May 31, 2018; 2. "Are You Ready to Love Me?" Released: July 13, 2018; 3. "If It's in Your Heart" Released: July 27, 2018

Healing Tide is a studio album by American duo the War and Treaty, released on August 10, 2018, by Strong World Entertainment with marketing and distribution by Thirty Tigers. It is their first album under the name the War and Treaty, and second overall after 2016's Love Affair under the name Trotter & Blount. Produced and recorded by Buddy Miller, Healing Tide peaked at number 11 on the US Billboard Top Heatseekers Albums chart and at number twenty-six on the Independent Albums chart.

== Background ==
Before combining to form the War and Treaty, Michael Trotter Jr. sang in church before serving two tours of duty in Iraq. Recalling his time on duty, Trotter said, "I didn’t think I would make it back home [...] I only knew music was what I love, it was soothing. A lot of times they said Trotter why don’t you sing?" Jewly Hight of National Public Radio writes he 'was dealt the singular sacred duty of paying tribute to fallen comrades in song'. Chris Estey of Paste explains further, 'a burden was placed in his heart to create music like this, confronting every evil and rhapsodizing about long-held-off freedoms in this world. His powerful voice got into the media through broadcast talent shows in service to the military; it almost redeemed the loneliness and suffering of being stationed away from all he loved.' Following his tour of duty, Hight writes that Trotter Jr. struck 'out as a smoothly seductive R&B singer-songwriter, citing influences like Gerald Levert and Tyrese'.

Tanya Blount Trotter first came to prominence in the 1993 film and soundtrack Sister Act 2: Back in the Habit, where her duet with Lauryn Hill on "His Eye Is on the Sparrow" was cited as a memorable moment by MadameNoire. The following year, her debut album Natural Thing was released, featuring the internationally charting single "I'm Gonna Make You Mine" and "Through the Rain" which peaked at number twenty-seven on the US R&B/Hip-Hop Songs chart and number ninety on the US Billboard Hot 100. In 1995, she featured on "Freedom (Theme from Panther)" the title song for the film Panther, which peaked at number forty-five on the US Billboard Hot 100 and reached the top twenty of the US R&B/Hip-Hop Songs chart. The same year, Blount received a nomination for Best New Artist at the Soul Train Awards.

Bruce Warren of WXPN explains, 'After he [Michael Trotter Jr.] left the service, he met Tanya at a music festival they were both playing. Tanya walked up to Michael after their shows, exchanged phone numbers, and their relationship blossomed in and out of the recording studio.' Tanya told Billboard, "it's kind of like when we first started dating; I told him we have to jump off the building at the same time, holding hands. It's a question you have to ask before you make that decision -- ARE you ready to love me? Are you ready to go through all the things a relationship requires you to go through and still be there?" Michael expressed, "She did not know I was a wounded war veteran when we dated [...] I never talked about it. She was very confused -- Why is this guy running and ducking under the bed when he hears fireworks on the Fourth of July? Why do I find him hiding in a dark corner when the rest of the day he was so bubbly and happy? She was like, 'You've got to let me in Mike. You've got to tell me what's going on so I can make a decision if I want to roll with this.' And when she finally convinced me to let her into the dark side of me, I just gave her everything, told her everything I went through and, then, 'Are you ready to love me baby? Are we still good?'

In 2016, the duo released their first album Love Affair as Trotter & Blount led by the single "Imagine". Jewly Hight of National Public Radio describes 'after teaming up in life and music, the pair dabbled in sleek soul updates under their combined surnames. But they also drew inspiration from voices embraced as touchstones across generations and genres — Ray Charles, Aretha Franklin, Johnny Cash and Nina Simone among them — and ultimately settled into a rootsy aesthetic animated by the range of their musical experiences.'

When asked if there was a connection with the song "Imagine" penned and recorded by John Lennon, Michael Trotter Jr. responded "The Beatles to me represented every human emotion you can feel. That band was so important. Their career speaks writing about love…like Ashford and Simpson. Most the 70s and 60s was trying to push our culture to togetherness." "Imagine" was also released as "Imagine…Hillary Clinton" in support of Democratic candidate Hillary Clinton. Speaking with EUR/Electronic Urban Report on the reasons for the political release, Trotter Jr. explained, "It's very interesting. My dad called, he works for the train system in Baltimore on the tracks, and he told me that Hillary Clinton herself called a lot of them. She spoke to each one of them personally to hear their concerns. She said she called to see if she had any similar stories to what they were going through…She was Senator and the 1st Lady and she learned… ‘Imagine’ getting behind a candidate that spends time with you."

The same year, they released the single "Hi Ho" as the War and Treaty, which was described by Paste writer Chris Estey as "the break out soul hit". In 2017, they released the EP Down to the River, heralded by Estey as "a splendidly made immediate classic about conflict and redemption." Expressing further that, "both seem to have been holding back plenty of passion and pain in their lives previous to knowing each other, and it's this kind of expressive blues and soul and folk and gospel that truly connects to every listener who may desperately need it."

Zoë Madonna of Boston Globe explained: "Ever since they were drafted to fill an ailing Buddy Miller's spot at the 2017 Americana Music Festival and Conference, the married duo from Albion, Mich., have been lighting up the folk scene." In 2018, they toured nationally at "prestigious festival stops and events such as Bonnaroo, Newport Folk Festival, Telluride Bluegrass Festival, Pickathon and AmericanaFest". Bruce Warren of WXPN expressed "After an exhilarating live performance at the Americana Music Association's music festival last September in Nashville at Cannery Ballroom, husband and wife musical duo The War and Treaty – Michael Trotter Jr. and Tanya Blount-Trotter – became one of the most talked about sets at the festival by a whole lot of people. Had I not been there to experience it for myself, I would have doubted the hyperbole."

== Recording ==
Healing Tide was recorded live and produced by Buddy Miller at his home studio in March over 5 days., whilst the album was solely penned by Michael Trotter Jr, who shares lead vocals with wife Tanya Blount Trotter throughout. Also featured alongside Miller on guitars and banjo are 'an impressive lineup of musicians including Brady Blade, Adam Chaffins, Jim Hoke, Russ Pahl and Sam Bush, whilst 'country music legend Emmylou Harris lends her distinctive voice to the track "Here Is Where the Loving Is At". Speaking with Rolling Stone on the title track's release, Michael Trotter Jr. expressed: "I hope people see our hearts on this record [...] I want people to feel like we care. When you think about artists you don’t think about that, but that's the way I want the world to feel about The War and Treaty."

Michael Trotter Jr. recalled to Billboard, "I remember we recoded the album so fast, like 14 songs in pretty much four days, and no third takes. We did two takes because we felt really guilty, and Buddy was like, 'This is not right. Something has to be wrong. We should do it again,' but a lot of times it was right the first time." Featured artist Emmylou Harris brought brownies from her mother's recipe to the recording session of "Here Is Where The Loving Is At".

In an interview with Two Story Melody, Michael Trotter Jr. spoke on the recording process with Buddy Miller, expressing, "It went from working with this icon to someone who truly cares and wants to keep it authentic. He would tell us, "No, that's too much," or "Let's clean up that growl some and really let the story come through," or "Maybe that resonator makes it too country in a way y’all don’t want." All of it was a partnership. Buddy has a unique way of reminding you of yourself. We had a blast working with him and watching him work. He's very shy, and most people don't see that shyness up close and personal! He's worked with everyone — Dolly Parton, Emmylou Harris, Band of Joy, Patty Griffin — but he forgets all of that when it comes to you. He says, "Today, I’m producing The War and Treaty." It's humbling and unique. He's taken the position of godfather in our lives, and we truly love him and his wife, Julie. She came down a few times during our sessions. Anyone who knows her knows that she's a riot. She could be a comedian in her own right; twenty seconds with Julie is enough to prove it! She sat in on our session one time, and she couldn't believe that that sound was coming from a studio in her home! The whole process was unique, from spending time with Julie and watching her interact with our son, Legend — she even brought him a stuffed animal — to eating homemade brownies made by Emmylou Harris herself."

== Composition ==
Warren of WXPN described the title track "Healing Tide" as "a spiritual distant cousin to Delaney & Bonnie's 'Soul Shake'," on which "Michael and Tanya wrap their powerful voices around a driving beat that shimmies and shakes with relentless rock and roll powered soul music."

Hight for National Public Radio wrote, "In 'Are You Ready to Love Me', a strutting country-soul number laced with horns and pedal steel, she pleads for physical affection and promises eager attentiveness as a lover, building to her insistent delivery of the question posed in the title. He sings the first half of 'If It's in Your Heart' as though he's summoning the courage to press his lover for honesty and find out whether or not the intensity of her devotion equals his own."

Hight described "Here Is Where the Loving Is At" as a "loping string band number" on which Emmylou Harris and "the Trotters paint a picture of lasting partnership as an earthy, effortful endeavor. 'Just hold me to the words I say', Tanya implores, attacking the start of the next line with a teasingly determined growl. 'And don't go looking somewhere else instead'." For the recording session at Buddy Miller's Nashville home, Emmylou Harris brought brownies.

Whilst on "Hearts", "a gospelly piano ballad in 6/8 time, the couple swap grand declarations of the bleakness they'd face without each other's company. They turn fierce when they declare their shared conviction during the bridge: 'We've got a reason to keep our love growing strong / Everything between us helps us move along'. Then their belting softens into an intimate murmur of shared belief: 'We'd find each other's hearts'."

"Jeep Cherokee Laredo" is described as "sensual heat [...] with its sly, New Orleans-style syncopation and burbling organ. 'You keep on peeking through the foggy windows / Please disregard all sly innuendo', they playfully scold a would-be busybody, flaunting the pleasure of the mischief shared between the two of them." Commenting on Michael Trotter Jr's songwriting, Hight expressed "the lyrics, penned by Michael (the author of all their material, who often describes his writing's autobiographical inspiration) have a big-talking punch equally connected to hip-hop and the blues" whilst "the ardor that the Trotters bring to the a capella number 'Love Like There's No Tomorrow' is at once particular and sweeping."

Zoë Madonna of Boston Globe wrote: "Only one song mentions religion outright, but many of the tracks rumble with the vigorous rhythms of the kind of black church music that was imprinted on so many of the first rock 'n' roll musicians." Whilst "the Trotters' passion for each other is on full view on tracks such as 'Hearts' and 'All I Want to Do', and 'Jeep Cherokee Laredo' rocks on the coy, cute edge of raunchy. On the album opener 'Love Like There's No Tomorrow', the two cry out that declaration over a slow, simmering beat, calling to everyone who can hear them to do the same."

== Promotion ==
On August 23, 2018, the War and Treaty announced the Healing Tide Tour, commencing October 2, 2018 in Los Angeles and ending in Indianapolis on November 17, 2018.

== Critical reception ==
Professional ratings
Aggregate scores
Source	Rating
Metacritic	79/100
Review scores
Source	Rating
American Songwriter	4/5 stars
Boston Globe	(Favorable)
Glide	8/10 stars
No Depression	(Favorable)
Rolling Stone	3.5/5 stars

Healing Tide received an aggregate score of 79/100 on Metacritic which indicates 'generally favorable reviews'. The title track was WXPN's 'Gotta Hear Song of the Week'. Stephen L. Betts of Rolling Stone described the "joyfully relentless title track" as "reminiscent of classic Ike and Tina Turner rock-infused soul". Jewly Hight of National Public Radio wrote: "There are a couple of hard-charging, rock and soul originals on the Trotter's upcoming album, Healing Tide, that recall the dueling vigor of the music the Turners made together. But while Tina Turner's revelations have made us hear the volatility of her relationship with Ike in the musical heat they generated, the Trotters' songs 'All I Wanna Do' and 'Healing Tide' convey an ecstatic, empowering sense of partnership that serves as the duo's creative engine and core message."

Zoë Madonna of Boston Globe wrote: "In contrast to Tanya's earlier work, the War and Treaty's music is soul-shaking and raucous. Michael's lyrics draw on the duo's complex personal journeys toward love. Their sound has drawn comparisons to that of Ike and Tina Turner, but given the shadow cast by Ike's years of abuse, it feels almost wrong to compare the two couples." Madonna also expressed "the War and Treaty sings about is love, and theirs is not a cynic's album. And even without backstories, the songs speak for themselves. Michael plays keyboards and wields his clarion tenor like a flaming sword. Tanya's voice is sinuous and muscular, with a raw edge that was wrapped in layers of reverb on her earlier work but now packs an invigorating punch as she tears through high notes."

Writing for American Songwriter, Hal Horowitz expressed, "Affirming the essence of all things positive, healing and loving has seldom felt so good. All married couple Michael Trotter Jr. and Tanya Trotter need is their booming voices and a tambourine, as on the stripped-down opening 'Love Like There's No Tomorrow' to get the spiritual juices flowing." Horowitz described the songs as "heartfelt and emotion packed" where "Michael channels Otis Redding and Wilson Pickett as he reaches for the heavens on the searing ballad 'If It's in Your Heart' and Tanya does the same with nods to Aretha, Etta James and even Joplin on her scorching solo vocal in the churchy 'Are You Ready to Love Me?'." Horowitz noted "the chemistry of both singers feeding off each other and Miller's backing musicians on the carnal 'Jeep Cherokee Laredo', propelled by Miller's banjo and guest Jim Hoke's organ and baritone sax, that kicks the duo into overdrive" whilst "Emmylou Harris adds her distinctive pipes to the sweet, bluegrass-infused 'Here Is Where the Loving Is At'." In closing, Horowitz wrote: "When the tempos pump and chug, as on the thumping 'All I Wanna Do', the rugged, propulsive energy generated by the War and Treaty is nothing less than inspirational. With their beaming outpouring of positivity and joyous approach to life and love, this rousing music encourages togetherness in these troubled times."

== Track listing ==
All tracks are written by Michael Trotter Jr.

No.	Title	Length
1.	"Love Like There's No Tomorrow"	2:24
2.	"Healing Tide"	3:33
3.	"Are You Ready to Love Me?"	3:34
4.	"Hearts"	5:13
5.	"Jeep Cherokee Laredo"	3:18
6.	"One and the Same"	4:00
7.	"If It's in Your Heart"	5:05
8.	"Here Is Where the Loving Is At" (featuring Emmylou Harris)	4:20
9.	"All I Wanna Do"	4:13
10.	"It's Not Over Yet"	5:20
11.	"Little New Bern"	4:26
Total length:		45:26

== Charts ==
Chart (2018)	Peak position
US Heatseekers Albums (Billboard)	11
US Independent Albums (Billboard)	26
US Americana/Folk Album Sales (Billboard)	18
US Rock Album Sales (Billboard)	46
