= Diamond Stingily =

American artist and poet (born 1990)

- Born: 1990 (age 35–36); Chicago, United States
- Parent: Byron Stingily (father)
- Family: Byron Stingily Jr. (brother)

Diamond Stingily (born 1990) is an American artist and poet. Stingily's art practice explores aspects of identity, iconography and mythology, and childhood. Stingily lives and works in New York City.

== Early life and education ==
Stingily grew up in Chicago, Illinois. As a child, Stingily spent much of her time at her mother's hair salon in West Chicago. She played softball competitively from childhood up until graduating high school. Her father, Byron Stingily, is an R&B and house-music singer and her brother, Byron Stingily Jr., is a professional football player.

Stingily studied creative writing at Columbia College.

== Work ==
Stingily has exhibited at numerous galleries and museums, including the Institute of Contemporary Art (Miami), Greene Naftali Gallery, Kunstverein München, Wattis Institute for Contemporary Arts, Queer Thoughts, Art Basel Statements, Museum of Contemporary Art Detroit, and the New Museum in New York City. Stingily is a published author and holds a podcast-style radio show at Know Wave called The Diamond Stingily Show.

Stingily's earliest project Forever in our Hearts opened at Egg in Chicago in 2014. The project simulated the artist's own death through a funeral arrangement and obituary. The show took place in a storefront display window. Accompanying the display, Stingily wrote an obituary-inspired poem that only existed online and in-print behind the window display. Egg is a project-based space in Chicago founded by artist Puppies Puppies and Forrest Nash (founder of art blog Contemporary Art Daily).

In 2015, Stingily collaborated with artist Martine Syms in Syms' video work Notes on Gestures (2015). Stingily was featured as the central actor in the video which examined body language, reaction GIFs, and the phrase, "Everybody wanna be a black woman but nobody wanna be a black woman." Stingily stayed in New York after their collaboration.

After moving to New York Stingily began creating and showing her Kaas works in group exhibitions such as The End of Violent Crime at Queer Thoughts and Denude at Ramiken Crucible.

'Love, Diamond,' Kaas, and Elephant Memory

Stingily published her first book through Dominica imprint titled, Love, Diamond. The book is a "reprint of the artist's first diary written as an 8-year-old" growing up in Chicago. Stingily has kept most of her journals since she began writing at an early age and was encouraged to write by her grandmother. She has performed readings with fellow artists and writers Justin Allen, Rindon Johnson, Juliana Huxtable, and Andrew Durbin.

Stingily's first solo exhibition, titled Kaas, opened at Queer Thoughts in New York in May 2016. The show featured a number of sculptures made of Kanekalon hair, knockers, barrettes, and beads that referenced both Kaa (the snake character made famous in Rudyard Kipling's The Jungle Book) and Medusa's head of snakes. Later that year, Stingily's second solo exhibition, titled Elephant Memory, opened at Ramiken Crucible in New York. On view were larger and more elaborate Kaas sculptures, used doors with locks, baseball bats, telephone cords, and a video work obstructed by a chain-link fence. The exhibition, "teased out issues of racial violence," in America, specifically Stingily's hometown of Chicago and New York.

In 2017, Artists Space invited Stingily and artist Rindon Johnson to read from recent works alongside artists Justin Allen and Deborah Willis.

Stingily was included in the New Museum's group show Trigger: Gender as a Weapon and a Tool. Stingily created her largest Kaas sculpture-to-date, a hair braid piece that pierced through four floors of the museum. Stingily also showed artwork through Queer Thoughts at FIAC in 2017. Her third solo exhibition, titled Surveillance, opened at Ramiken Crucible in Los Angeles, California in late 2017.

In November 2017, Stingily was selected by Forbes magazine for the prestigious '30 Under 30' in the Arts and Culture section.

Stingily's work was exhibited in the 2018 New Museum Triennial Songs for Sabotage. Her first solo museum exhibition was held at the Institute of Contemporary Art in Miami in 2018.. Subsequent solo presentations were held at Kunstverein München and the Wattis Institute for Contemporary Arts in 2019.

Themes and critical reception

Stingily's work explores various themes of racial identity and femininity, memory and childhood, iconography, surveillance and paranoia as well as freedom. Much of her work is in direct response to her "social and economic background" growing up in West Chicago.

Critics have reviewed her first two exhibitions favorably. Curator Johanna Fateman writes in Artforum that Diamond's work, "reflects on the normalization and replication of brutal scripts and systems using perfect, pervasive materials." California-based curator Hanna Girma notes that "Stingily courageously navigates between consolation and discomfort, personal and shared memory. Her work celebrates youthful perception, black creativity and resilience while simultaneously thrusting the viewer into their current disposition, with its fear of contact, normalized violence and ancestral hardship."

== Exhibitions ==
Solo exhibitions

- Orgasms Happened Here, 52 Walker, New York, New York, 2024

Diamond Stingily’s 2024 exhibition Orgasms Happened Here at 52 Walker in New York expanded her ongoing exploration of memory, domestic space, and Black suburban life through a series of architectural installations based on her childhood home in Chicago. The exhibition included built-in closets, newspapers, stained glass windows, baseball bats, bricks, towels, and iron gates that reference suburban American households, domestic places, and glimpses of longing. Critics connected the exhibition to Stingily’s larger practice of transforming ordinary objects into emotionally charged symbols tied to personal history, sense of safety, exclusion in domestic spaces, grief, and vulnerability. The title of the exhibition came from a note discovered by her brother in a closet of Stingily’s childhood home that read “orgasms happened here,” which Stingily used as a starting point to examine secrecy, desire, vulnerability, and the emotional meaning attached to interior spaces. In an interview, Stingily also connected the exhibition to recurring themes in her earlier work, including childhood memories, desire, and vulnerability within domestic environments.

- Wall Sits, Kunstverein München, Munich, Germany, 2019
- Doing the Best I Can, Wattis Institute for Contemporary Arts, San Francisco, California, 2019
- Life In My Pocket, Institute of Contemporary Art (Miami), Miami, Florida, 2018
- For The People of [__________], Freedman Fitzpatrick, Paris, France, 2018
- Surveillance, Ramiken Crucible, Los Angeles, California, 2017
- Elephant Memory, Ramiken Crucible, New York, New York, 2016
- Kaas, Queer Thoughts, New York, New York, 2016

Selected group exhibitions

- John Knight, Brandon Ndife, Tom Burr, Diamond Stingily, Greene Naftali Gallery, New York, New York, 2023
- C^4, Kunstmuseum Liechtenstein, Vaduz, Liechtenstein, 2022
- Grief and Grievance: Art and Mourning in America, curated by Okwui Enwezor, New Museum, New York, New York, 2021
- John Dewey, Who?: New Presentation of the Collection of Contemporary Art, Museum Ludwig, Cologne, Germany, 2020
- Straying from the Line, curated by Nina Pohl, Schinkel Pavillon, Berlin, Germany, 2019
- 2018 New Museum Triennial: Songs of Sabotage, New Museum, New York, New York, 2018
- Trigger: Gender as a Weapon and a Tool, curated by Johanna Burton, New Museum, New York, New York, 2017
- Where did she go?, with Siera Hyte and Diamond Stingily, Holiday Forever, Jackson Hole, Wyoming, 2016
- Object Anthology, Publishing House, Gstaad, Switzerland, 2016
- Round 43: Small Business/Big Change: Economic Perspectives from Artists and Artrepreneurs, hosted by Martine Syms, Project Row Houses, Houston, Texas, 2016
- Denude, Ramiken Crucible, New York, New York, 2015
- The End of Violent Crime, Queer Thoughts, New York, New York, 2015
- Small Pillow, Queer Thoughts at Arcadia Missa, London, United Kingdom, 2015
- Rainbow, Queer Thoughts, Nicaragua, 2015
- Forever in our Hearts, EGG, Chicago, Illinois, 2014

== See also ==
- Dozie Kanu
