= Lover's Game =

Studio album by The War and Treaty
- Released: March 10, 2023
- Genre: Americana; Southern soul
- Length: 39:25
- Label: UMG Nashville
- Producer: Dave Cobb

The War and Treaty chronology
| Hearts Town (2020) | Lover's Game (2023) | Plus One (2025) |

Singles from Lover's Game
- 1. "That's How Love is Made" Released: August 26, 2022; 2. "Lover's Game" Released: September 30, 2022; 3. "Ain't No Harmin' Me" Released: February 10, 2023

Lover's Game is the third studio album by the American southern soul duo The War and Treaty. Produced by Dave Cobb, the album is their major label debut and was released on March 10, 2023, by UMG Nashville. The duo, consisting of married couple Michael and Tanya Trotter, co-wrote nine of the project's ten tracks. The album follows their 2020 release Hearts Town.

== Background ==
The group signed a major label deal with Universal Music Group Nashville in May 2022. They surprisingly released their first project for the label, Blank Page, an extended play featuring four tracks that were later included on Lover's Game, on November 9, 2022, following a performance with Brothers Osborne at the 56th CMA Awards.

The album's full track list was revealed on February 3, 2023. Of the album, Tanya Trotter stated "There is no greater or higher calling in life than to be conduits of love and that's exactly what Lover's Game is to us. From the opening guitar riff to the last piano note on this record...love is the intention and love is the subject that can't be ignored. We've been through every facet of it together and we could not be more excited to share another layer of our story." Summarizing the album's sonic makeup, the duo said "It's love, it's rock 'n' roll, it's blues, it's country. It's everything we love. We're super excited. We're so honored and excited for people to hear it."

In an interview about the album, the duo discussed the theme of love that defines the album, with Michael Trotter explaining "I think we've used love now as such a cliché saying and oftentimes in our society where being nonchalant about a thing seems more popular" and noting that the aim of the project was to take listeners on a journey of love through different seasons and situations. The duo spoke positively about working with producer Dave Cobb, who encouraged them to have confidence in their strengths.

=== Singles ===
The album's first single "That's How Love is Made", was released on September 20, 2022. Of the song, Michael explained "I can't believe the day has come and we finally get to let the world in on the secret that is, 'That's How Love Is Made' and we hope folks connect to it as much as we have. My prayer is that so much love is created through this song that eventually hate is drowned out. Let love be as creative as it wants in our friendships, in our business partnerships, in our neighborhood, and never put the chains on her...for she is meant to be free." The official music video, filmed at Justin Timberlake's Twelve Thirty Club in Nashville, was released simultaneously.

The title track was released as the album's second single on September 30, 2022. Discussing the song, Michael noted "This song came together so quickly when we were in the studio with Dave and it really kicked off the sentiment behind the album. We had this 'aha' moment about falling in love over food and drinks and as three foodies it was easy to think... 'Margarita, hot chicken, strawberry wine...looking for your lovin' to be mine all mine!' We can't wait for the chance to turn on the radio and hear this song screaming through the airwaves."

"Ain't No Harmin' Me", the album's third single, was released on February 10, 2023.

== Track listing ==
All tracks are written by Michael Trotter Jr. and Tanya Trotter, unless otherwise noted.

Lover's Game track listing
| No. | Title | Writer(s) | Length |
|---|---|---|---|
| 1. | "Lover's Game" | Dave Cobb, Michael Trotter Jr., Tanya Trotter | 2:49 |
| 2. | "Blank Page" | | 5:35 |
| 3. | "Ain't No Harmin' Me" | | 3:50 |
| 4. | "Yesterday's Burn" | | 5:11 |
| 5. | "That's How Love Is Made" | Dave Barnes, Trotter Jr., Trotter | 3:46 |
| 6. | "The Best That I Have" | | 3:42 |
| 7. | "Dumb Luck" | Beau Bedford | 3:36 |
| 8. | "Angel" | | 3:22 |
| 9. | "Up Yonder" | | 3:14 |
| 10. | "Have You a Heart" | | 4:20 |
| Total length: | | | 39:25 |

== Charts ==
| Chart (2023) | Peak position |
|---|---|
| UK Americana Albums (OCC) | 38 |
| US Top Current Album Sales (Billboard) | 56 |

== Personnel ==
Credits adapted from AllMusic.

The War and Treaty

- Michael Trotter Jr. - vocals, keyboards
- Tanya Trotter - vocals

Other personnel

- Brian Allen - bass
- Brandon Bell - engineering
- Cremaine Booker - cello
- Max Brown - guitar
- Sarah Marie Burke - A&R
- Dave Cobb - production, acoustic guitar
- Tom Davis - bass
- Chris Elvidge - percussion
- Paul Franklin - pedal steel guitar
- Kiran Gupta - organ
- Austin Hargrave - photography
- Kera Jackson - art production
- Pete Lyman - mastering
- Paul Mabury - drums
- Karen Naff - art direction
- Chris Powell - drums, percussion
- Vance Powell - engineering, mixing
- JD Simo - electric guitar
- Philip Towns - organ, piano, strings
