= Love Like There's No Tomorrow =

Love Like There's No Tomorrow may refer to:

- "Love Like There's No Tomorrow", a song by Aaron Tippin and Thea Tippin from the former's Stars & Stripes
- "Love Like There's No Tomorrow", a song by The War and Treaty from the album Healing Tide
