= More to Love (song) =

Single by Volcano
- B-side: "Let Your Body Be Free"
- Released: 11 July 1994
- Genre: Dance-pop; house
- Length: 3:34
- Label: Deconstruction; Olympic Recordings
- Songwriter(s): Bjørn Toske; Ole Mjøs; Richie Malone; Rune Lindbæk; Samantha Cartwright
- Producer(s): Bjørn Toske; Ole Mjøs; Richie Malone; Rune Lindbæk

Volcano singles chronology
"Let Your Body Be Free" (1993)	"More to Love" (1994)	"That's the Way Love Is" (1995)

"More to Love" is a song by Norwegian dance music duo Volcano, released in July 1994 by Deconstruction Records. The song features British singer Samantha Cartwright and became a club hit in the UK, peaking at number 32 on the UK Singles Chart and number 10 on the UK Club Chart. In Norway, it became a top-10 hit, peaking at number seven on VG-lista. Norwegian journalists Ole Mjøs and Rune Lindbæk of Volcano met Cartwright in the UK after the duo had recorded "More to Love". They got on so well that they decided to re-record the song as a trio with Cartwright and subsequently signed a long-term deal with Deconstruction. "More to Love" is one of few Norwegian songs that have reached the UK Top 40.

== Critical reception ==
Alan Jones from Music Week complimented the song as "an uplifting House anthem", noting that "this possesses a catchy chorus and some smart mixes". He concluded, "Crossover potential, likely to be fulfilled." Pan-European magazine Music & Media wrote, "You might expect an eruption of whatever origin, but Pompeii scenes are out of the question. Yet, vocalist Samantha Cartwright lifts this soulful pop dance record above average." James Hamilton from the Record Mirror Dance Update named it a "Norwegian duo's Samantha Cartwright wailed 127.9bpm digifunkish throbber with StoneBridge's classy cool 100% More Music and K-Klass's surging percussive Klub Mixes" in his weekly dance column.

== Track listings ==
- 12-inch single, UK (1994)

A. "More to Love" (Original Mix)
B1. "More to Love" (K-Klass Klub Mix)
B2. "Let Your Body Be Free"

- CD single - CD1, UK (1994)
1. "More to Love" (Radio Mix) — 3:36
2. "More to Love" (Original Mix) — 6:49
3. "More to Love" (K-Klass Klub Mix)
4. "Let Your Body Be Free" — 6:18
- CD single - CD2, UK (1994)
1. "More to Love" (Radio Mix) — 3:36
2. "More to Love" (K-Klass Pharmacy Dub) — 7:33
3. "More to Love" (Stonebridge 100% Music Mix) — 8:04
4. "More to Love" (Rob & Stone Club Mix) — 6:31
- CD maxi-single, Europe (1994)
1. "More to Love" (Original Edit) — 3:34
2. "More to Love" (Original Mix) — 6:46
3. "More to Love" (K Klass Klub Mix) — 7:21
4. "More to Love" (Stonebridge 100% Music Mix) — 8:02

== Charts ==
Chart (1994)	Peak position
Europe (Eurochart Hot 100)	92
Norway (VG-lista)	7
UK Singles (OCC)	32
UK Club Chart (Music Week)	10
