= That's the Way Love Is (Ten City song) =

1989 single by Ten City

Single by Ten City

from the album Foundation
- Released: 1989
- Genre: Deep house; soul
- Label: Atlantic
- Lyricists: Byron Burke; Byron Stingily; Herb Lawson
- Producers: Marshall Jefferson; Ten City

Ten City singles chronology
"Funny Love" (1989)	"That's the Way Love Is" (1989)	"Devotion" (1989)

Music video
- "That's the Way Love Is" on YouTube

"That's the Way Love Is" is a song by Chicago-based dance trio Ten City, released in 1989 by Atlantic Records as a single from their debut album, Foundation (1989). The song was written by the trio and produced by them with Marshall Jefferson. It reached number eight in the United Kingdom and number 18 in West Germany. In the United States, the song peaked at number 12 on the Billboard Hot Black Singles chart, number one on the Billboard Dance Club Play chart, and number three on the Billboard 12-inch Singles Sales chart. Rolling Stone magazine ranked "That's the Way Love Is" number 165 on their list of "200 Greatest Dance Songs of All Time" in 2022.

== Release ==
The single release featured two main versions – on most releases, an acid house mix by Steve "Silk" Hurley (variously titled either "Deep House Mix" or "Acieeed Mix") was the A-side, while a string-led mix by Timmy Regisford, named the "Underground Mix", appeared on the B-side. Both mixes also had corresponding radio edits and dub versions.

== Critical reception ==
Tim Jeffery from Record Mirror wrote, "The time has come. Ten City's 'That's The Way Love Is' is not just the latest club record to hit the charts, but a significant event that, along with their forthcoming album, Foundation, could turn out to be one of the major turning-points of dance music when the history books are written in years to come." Another Record Mirror editor, Betty Page commented, "Deeeeeep house, we now discover, is really just soul music in disguise — but with that insistently brilliant house beat, of course. Ten City encapsulate this form of dance-with-feeling, and seem destined on this showing to be a Big Act rather than just a faceless name on a dance record. I particularly liked the gospel-meets-acid bits."

== Chart performance ==
"That's the Way Love Is" entered the top 10 in the UK, peaking at number eight during its third and fourth weeks on the UK Singles Chart, on January 29, 1989. It was also a top-10 hit in Luxembourg, a top-20 hit in Ireland and West Germany, and a top-30 hit in Belgium and the Netherlands. Outside Europe, "That's the Way Love Is" entered the top 30 in New Zealand, peaking at number 24. In the US, the song charted on three Billboard charts, peaking at number one on the Dance Club Play chart, number three on the 12-inch Singles Sales chart, and number 12 on the Hot Black Singles chart. In West Asia, it became a top-20 hit in Israel, peaking at number 20 on February 12, 1989.

== Impact and legacy ==
Alex Henderson from AllMusic said it "aren't simply about the beat and the track, but also the rich vocals that would have sounded great even if Ten City had gone a cappella." He noted that "these guys enthusiastically recall the great soul/disco of the mid- to late 1970s and make no secret of their love of that era."

In 1994, British DJ Smokin Jo named it one of her classic cuts, saying, "I got this in 1989 when I was going out clubbing. It always got everybody in the club feeling up. It's such a happy vibe. No-one can knock that record." In 1995, another British DJ, Graham Gold, named it one of his favourite songs, adding, "I used to play this at Gullivers. The first time you ever hear Byron's voice you're sold – hook, line and sinker." In 1998, DJ Magazine ranked it number 57 in their list of "Top 100 Club Tunes". In 1999, the Chicago alt rock-soul group Poi Dog Pondering covered the song on their album Natural Thing. The group proceeded to remix the song several more times on their That's the Way Love Is (Re-Mix EP), which featured remixes by Maurice Josusah, Mike Dunn, Lego, Jesse De La Pena and Bunky.

In 2018, British clubbing magazine Mixmag included the song in their ranking of "Vocal House: The 30 All-Time Biggest Anthems". Tillie Wood wrote,

"The kind of track that grabs you and can instantly send your mood shooting to the stratosphere. Hearing this one dropped while walking into a club has had us wanting to backflip before we’ve even reached the dancefloor. The 1989 single from Chicago-based trio Ten City reached number 1 in the US Dance Music Play Chart. Featuring Marshall Jefferson on production, it's full of all the elements any vocal house anthem needs to make you feel alive on the dancefloor."

In 2022, American magazine Rolling Stone ranked "That’s the Way Love Is" number 165 in their list of "200 Greatest Dance Songs of All Time".

== Track listings ==
- 7-inch single, US (1989)
1. "That's the Way Love Is" (Acieed Mix/Edited Version) – 4:10
2. "That's the Way Love Is" (Underground Mix/Edited Version) – 4:12
- 12-inch, US (1989)
1. "That's the Way Love Is" (Deep House Mix/Extended Version) – 6:44
2. "That's the Way Love Is" (Underground Mix/Extended Version) – 8:08
- 12-inch, Europe (1989)
1. "That's the Way Love Is" (Acieed Mix/Extended Version) – 6:44
2. "That's the Way Love Is" (Underground Mix/Extended Version) – 8:08
3. "Devotion" (Radio Mix) – 4:00

== Charts ==
=== Weekly charts ===
Chart (1989)	Peak position
Belgium (Ultratop 50 Flanders)	21
Ireland (IRMA)	11
Israel (Israeli Singles Chart)	20
Luxembourg (Radio Luxembourg)	6
Netherlands (Dutch Top 40)	26
Netherlands (Single Top 100)	23
New Zealand (Recorded Music NZ)	24
UK Singles (Official Charts)	8
US 12-inch Singles Sales (Billboard)	3
US Dance Club Play (Billboard)	1
US Hot Black Singles (Billboard)	12
US Dance Tracks (Dance Music Report)	1
West Germany (GfK)	18

=== Year-end charts ===
Chart (1989)	Position
UK Singles (OCC)	100
US 12-inch Singles Sales (Billboard)	19
US Dance Club Play (Billboard)	6
West Germany (Media Control)	100

== Byron Stingily version ==
"That's the Way Love Is"

Single by Byron Stingily
- Released: 1999
- Genre: House
- Length: 4:30
- Label: Nervous Records

Ten years later, former Ten City lead singer Byron Stingily returned to the top of the dance chart with his own recording of the song.
