= New Directors/New Films Festival =

Annual film festival in New York City

New Directors/New Films
- Location: New York City, New York, U.S.
- Founded: 1972
- Hosted by: Film at Lincoln Center; Museum of Modern Art
- Language: International
- Website: newdirectors.org

New Directors/New Films (ND/NF) is an annual film festival held in New York City, organized jointly by the Museum of Modern Art (MoMA) and the Film Society of Lincoln Center. The festival generally selects films from first-time directors and rising filmmakers, some of whom have become renowned in their later careers.

== Overview ==
Each year, the festival shows films from a large number of countries, many of which are making their North American or United States premiers. However, the festival also occasionally hosts world premieres, such as in 2022, with the film The African Desperate.

Screenings at Lincoln Center take place in the Walter Reade Theater and the Francesca Beale Theater. At MoMA, they are shown in the Titus 1 and Titus 2 theaters.

The festival is well regarded by critics and receives significant coverage from local and international media, including The New York Times and Variety.

== History ==
The festival was established in 1972. Since its inauguration, ND/NF has showcased early work from dozens of now prominent filmmakers, such as:

- Steven Spielberg (The Sugarland Express, 1974)
- Spike Lee (Joe’s Bed-Stuy Barbershop: We Cut Heads, 1983)
- Pedro Almodovar (What Have I Done to Deserve This?, 1985)
- Wong Kar Wai (Days of Being Wild, 1991)
- Richard Linklater (Slacker, 1991)
- Christopher Nolan (Following, 1999)
- Yorgos Lanthimos (Dogtooth, 2010)
- Denis Villenueve (Incendies, 2011)
