= Natural Thing (Tanya Blount album) =

Studio album by Tanya Blount
- Released: March 8, 1994
- Length: 45:14
- Label: Polydor
- Producer: Byron Burke; Kenni Hairston; Steve "Silk" Hurley; Kevin "K-Jack" Jackson; Herb Lawson; Eric "E-Smoove" Miller; Davitt Sigerson; Byron Stingily; Erik "Lil Rik" White

Singles from Natural Thing
- 1. "I'm Gonna Make You Mine" Released: February 2, 1994; 2. "Through the Rain" Released: June 28, 1994; 3. "Hold On" Released: November 1, 1994

Natural Thing is the debut studio album by American singer Tanya Blount, released on March 8, 1994 under Polydor Records. The album peaked at No. 58 on the Billboard Top R&B Albums chart and features the top 40 R&B hit, "Through the Rain", "I'm Gonna Make You Mine" and "Hold On".

== Critical reception ==
Professional ratings
Review scores
Source	Rating
AllMusic	2/5 stars

AllMusic editor William Ruhlmann called Blount a "competent but unexceptional R&B singer". He found that with Natural Thing she undertook to copy the quiet storm formula of Anita Baker on her debut album [...] but nothing about the record suggested she would be any real competition to Baker or other adult Black pop figures any time soon."

== Track listing ==
Natural Thing track listing
No.	Title	Writer(s)	Producer(s)	Length
1.	"I'm Gonna Make You Mine"	Marc Williams; Jere McAllister; Chantay Savage	Steve "Silk" Hurley; Christian Warren^{[a]}	4:47
2.	"Through the Rain"	Erik "Lil Rik" White; Kevin "K-Jack" Jackson; Brian Williams	White; Jackson	5:09
3.	"Hold On"	White; Jackson	White; Jackson	5:36
4.	"No More Lies"	White; Jackson	White; Jackson	3:51
5.	"Love Ballad"	Skip Scarborough	Kenni Hairston	3:30
6.	"Is It Love" (featuring Freddie Jackson)	Hairston; Marc Nelson	Hairston; Goh Hotoda^{[b]}	4:20
7.	"Spend Another Night"	Reggie Griffin; Cindy Mizelle	Griffin	4:38
8.	"Natural Thing"	Eric "E-Smoove" Miller; Savage	Miller	4:10
9.	"For All the Right Reasons"	Amy Sky; John Capek	Davitt Sigerson	4:23
10.	"Baby Love"	Eddie Towns; Antoinette Hilman	Byron Burke; Byron Stingily; Herb Lawson	4:55

Notes

- ^{^[a]} denotes additional producer(s)
- ^{^[b]} denotes co-producer(s)

== Charts ==
Chart (1994)	Peak position
US Top R&B/Hip-Hop Albums (Billboard)	58
