= I'm Gonna Make You Mine =

I'm Gonna Make You Mine may refer to:

- I'm Gonna Make You Mine (Lou Christie song), 1969
- I'm Gonna Make You Mine (Tanya Blount song), 1994
