= The War and Treaty =

American country music duo

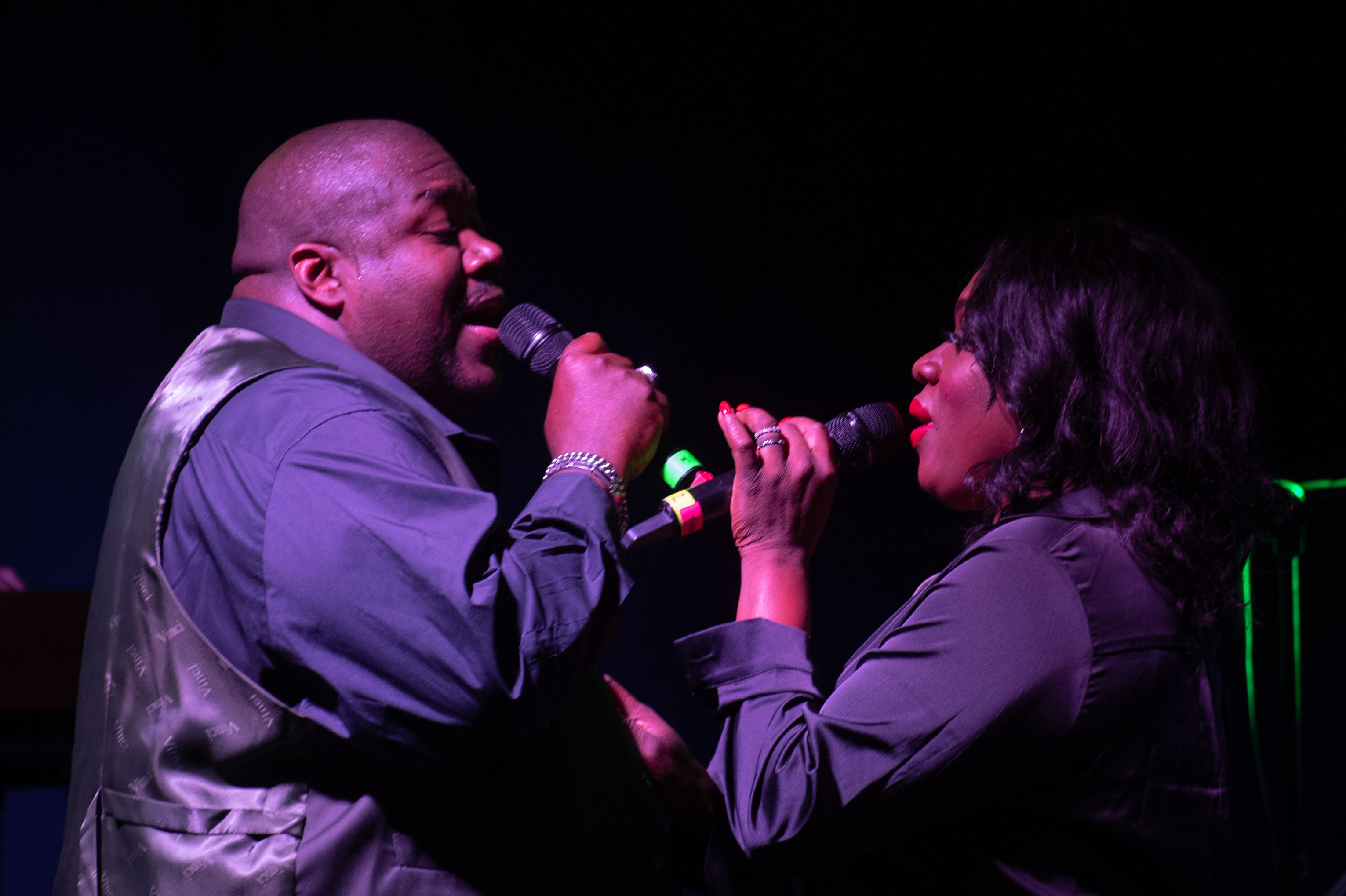
- The War and Treaty performing at Aviano Air Base in Aviano, Italy, October 2024

Background information
- Origin: Albion, Michigan, U.S.
- Genres: Americana; Southern soul; blues; folk; rock; gospel; country; R&B
- Years active: 2014–present
- Labels: Mercury Nashville; Universal Nashville; Rounder; Thirty Tigers
- Members: Michael Trotter Jr.; Tanya Trotter
- Website: thewarandtreaty.com

The War and Treaty is an American husband-and-wife duo consisting of singer-songwriters Michael Trotter Jr. and Tanya Trotter. Their debut studio album, Healing Tide (2018), received generally favorable reviews upon its release. Their second album, Hearts Town (2020), featured a collaboration with Emmylou Harris and had a Triple A top 40 hit single "Five More Minutes." In 2022, they signed to Universal Music Group Nashville, and released their major label debut, Lover's Game (2023). Their collaboration with Zach Bryan on the song "Hey Driver" made the top 20 on the Billboard Hot 100.

In 2023, the War and Treaty became the first Black duo to be nominated for the Country Music Association Award for Duo of the Year; along with being the first Black duo to be nominated for the Academy of Country Music Award for Duo of the Year. The duo was nominated for "Vocal Duo of the Year" for the CMA Awards in 2024 and received an Emmy for their work with the NFL's Tennessee Titans in 2025.

They have received two nominations for the 66th Annual Grammy Awards including Best New Artist. An upcoming biopic based on the group's life is set to be released.

== Career ==
In 2016, Michael Trotter Jr. and Tanya Blount released the duet album Love Affair as Trotter & Blount. In 2017, the War and Treaty released the EP Down to the River, said to be a mix of "blues, gospel, soul, bluegrass, and country" and commended by Estey as "a splendidly made immediate classic about conflict and redemption." According to Estey, "the two can sensually help heal the wounds from those confessional blasts with a sweet ballad like "Till The Mornin’"—they truly live up to the dynamic tension of their moniker."

In 2018, Rolling Stone reported that the War and Treaty's debut album Healing Tide would be released on August 10, 2018, saying that the lead single is a 'joyfully relentless title track, reminiscent of classic Ike and Tina Turner rock-infused soul'. On September 25, 2020, the War and Treaty released a second album, Hearts Town, on Rounder Records. On April 18, 2021, the duo joined Dierks Bentley for a performance of U2's "Pride (In the Name of Love)" at the 56th Academy of Country Music Awards.

The duo signed a major label deal with Mercury Nashville Records/UMG Nashville in May 2022. They performed a cover of "It's Only Rock 'n Roll (But I Like It)" alongside the Brothers Osborne at the 56th Annual Country Music Association Awards on November 9, 2022, and as a surprise, released their second EP Blank Page on the same day. The War and Treaty's major label debut album Lover's Game came out on March 10, 2023. The duo collaborated with Zach Bryan on the track "Hey, Driver" on his self-titled fourth studio album. The song debuted at number 14 on the Billboard Hot 100, marking the duo's first appearance on the chart.

In 2024 , The War & Treaty collaborated with Bon Jovi on their single, "The People's House," the single coming from Bon Jovi's latest album, Forever.

The duo released their sixth album, The Story of Michael and Tanya, which is inspired by their love story, on June 19, 2026.

== Personal ==
From 2003 to 2007, Michael served in the United States Army. He was assigned to the 1st Battalion, 6th Infantry Regiment, 2nd Brigade, 1st Armored Division. He served in Iraq and Germany and was a private first class.

During deployment, his unit stayed at a private palace of Saddam Hussein which had a piano in the basement. Michael learned how to play piano when his company commander, Captain Robert Scheetz, encouraged him to do so, knowing that he had a passion for singing. Scheetz was killed on a mission shortly afterwards. Michael wrote his first song in Scheetz's honor and sang it at his memorial. He began performing at the services of other fallen soldiers. The duo performed and endorsed Kamala Harris for president on Saturday, November 2, 2024, at a campaign rally in Charlotte, North Carolina.

== Discography ==
=== Studio albums ===
List of albums, with selected chart positions
Title	Album details	Peak chart positions		
Title	Album details	US Curr. Sales	US Heat.	US Indie
Love Affair (as Trotter & Blount)	Released: March 4, 2016; Label: Seven49Group; Format: CD, digital download	—	—	—
Healing Tide	Released: August 10, 2018; Label: Strong World Entertainment; Format: LP, CD, digital download	—	11	26
Hearts Town	Released: September 25, 2020; Label: The War and Treaty Corporation; Format: LP, CD, digital download	70	—	—
Lover's Game	Released: March 10, 2023; Label: Mercury Nashville, UMG Nashville; Format: LP, CD, digital download	56	—	—
Plus One	Released: February 14, 2025; Label: Mercury Nashville, UMG Nashville; Format: LP, CD, digital download	—	—	—
The Story of Michael and Tanya	Released: June 19, 2026; Label: Atlantic; Format: LP, CD, digital download	—	—	—

=== EPs ===
List of EPs
Title	Album details
Down to the River	Released: October 19, 2017; Label: Strong World Entertainment; Format: Digital download
Blank Page	Released: November 9, 2022; Label: Mercury Nashville, UMG Nashville; Format: Digital download

=== Singles ===
==== As a lead artist ====
List of singles with selected chart positions, sales figures and certifications
Title	Year	Chart positions		Album
Title	Year	US Triple A	US AC	Album
"Hi Ho"	2016	—	—	Down to the River
"Healing Tide"	2018	—	—	Healing Tide
"Are You Ready to Love Me?"	2018	—	—	Healing Tide
"Jealousy / Hustlin'"	2020	—	—	Hearts Town
"We Are One"	2020	—	—	Charity single
"Five More Minutes"	2020	22	—	Hearts Town
"Everything New (Sessions)" (with John Mark McMillan)	2021	—	—	Non-album single
"That's How Love Is Made"	2022	—	—	Lover's Game
"Lover's Game"	2022	—	—	Lover's Game
"A Sunday Kind of Love"	2023	—	—	TBA
"Stretch Out"	2023	—	—	TBA
"Cold" (live from The Academy of Country Music Honors)	2023	—	—	Non-album single
"Called You By Your Name"	2024	—	—	Plus One
"Do You Hear What I Hear?" (with Josh Groban)	2024	—	22	Non-album single

==== As a featured artist ====
List of singles with selected chart positions, sales figures and certifications
Title	Year	Chart positions	Album
Title	Year	US Triple A	Album
"America the Beautiful" (Kristin Wilkinson and Matt Rollings featuring Trisha Yearwood, Keb' Mo', Amy Grant and The War and Treaty)	2021	—	Non-album singles
"The Times They Are a-Changin'" (Nitty Gritty Dirt Band featuring Rosanne Cash, Steve Earle, Jason Isbell and The War and Treaty)	2021	—	Non-album singles
"Chuck-will's-widow" (video mix) (Amy Ray featuring The War and Treaty and Michelle Malone)	2021	—	Non-album singles

=== Other charted songs ===
List of singles with selected chart positions, sales figures and certifications
Title	Year	Peak chart positions					Certifications	Album
Title	Year	US	AUS	CAN	IRE	WW	Certifications	Album
"Hey Driver" (Zach Bryan featuring The War and Treaty)	2023	14	— (Note: "Hey Driver" did not enter the ARIA Top 100 Singles Chart, but peaked at number 20 on the ARIA Top 20 New Music Singles Chart.)	14	29	33	RIAA: 3× Platinum; ARIA: Platinum; BPI: Silver; MC: 3× Platinum; RMNZ: Platinum	Zach Bryan

=== Guest appearances ===
List of non-single guest appearances, with other performing artists, showing year released and album name
Title	Year	Other artist(s)	Album	Ref.
"It's Only Rock 'n Roll (But I Like It)"	2023	Brothers Osborne	Stoned Cold Country	
"Hey Driver"	2023	Zach Bryan	Zach Bryan	
"From a Distance"	2023	—N/a	More than a Whisper: Celebrating the Music of Nanci Griffith	

== Awards and nominations ==
Year	Ceremony	Nominated work	Category	Result	Ref.
2019	Americana Music Honors & Awards	The War and Treaty	Emerging Artist of the Year	Won	
2020	Folk Alliance International	The War and Treaty	Artist of the Year	Won	
2021	Pop Awards	The War and Treaty	Band/Group of the Year	Nominated	
2021	Americana Music Honors & Awards	The War and Treaty	Duo/Group of the Year	Nominated	
2022	Americana Music Honors & Awards	The War and Treaty	Duo/Group of the Year	Won	
2023	CMT Music Awards	"That's How Love is Made"	Duo/Group Video of the Year	Nominated	
2023	Academy of Country Music Awards	The War and Treaty	Vocal Duo of the Year	Nominated	
2023	Americana Music Honors & Awards	The War and Treaty	Duo/Group of the Year	Won	
2023	Country Music Association Awards	The War and Treaty	Vocal Duo of the Year	Nominated	
2023	Grammy Awards	The War and Treaty	Best New Artist	Nominated	
2023	Grammy Awards	"Blank Page"	Best American Roots Song	Nominated	
2024	Academy of Country Music Awards	The War And Treaty	Duo of the Year	Nominated	
2024	People's Choice Country Awards	"Hey Driver" (Zach Bryan featuring The War and Treaty)	The Collaboration Song of 2024	Nominated	
2024	People's Choice Country Awards	The War And Treaty	The Group/Duo of 2024	Nominated	
2024	Country Music Association Awards	The War And Treaty	Vocal Duo of the Year	TBA	
