= The African Desperate =

- Poster
- Directed by: Martine Syms
- Written by: Martine Syms; Rocket Caleshu
- Starring: Diamond Stingily
- Distributed by: Mubi
- Release date: September 16, 2022
- Running time: 97 minutes
- Country: United States
- Language: English

The African Desperate is a 2022 American comedy drama film written by Martine Syms and Rocket Caleshu, directed by Syms and starring Diamond Stingily.

== Cast ==
- Diamond Stingily as Palace
- Erin Leland as Hannah
- Erin Kelly Meuchner as Fern
- Brent David Finney as Liam
- Cammisa Buerhaus as Aidan
- Ruby McCollister as Portia

== Release ==
The film was released on September 16, 2022 in New York City.

== Reception ==
The film has an 85% rating on Rotten Tomatoes based on 13 reviews. Peyton Robinson of RogerEbert.com awarded the film three and a half stars out of four. Alex Saveliev of Film Threat rated the film an 8 out of 10. Susannah Gruder of IndieWire graded the film a B+. William Repass of Slant Magazine awarded the film two and a half stars out of four.
