= Hold On (Tanya Blount song) =

Single by Tanya Blount

from the album Natural Thing
- Released: November 1, 1994
- Recorded: 1993–1994
- Genre: R&B
- Length: 5:36
- Label: Polydor
- Songwriters: Kevin Jackson; Erik White
- Producers: Kevin Jackson; Erik White

Tanya Blount singles chronology
"Through the Rain" (1994)	"Hold On" (1994)

"Hold On" is a song by American R&B singer Tanya Blount. It was the third single released from Natural Thing.

== Track listing ==
Maxi-Promo CD

1. "Hold On" (Radio Edit 1)
2. "Hold On" (Radio Edit 2)
3. "Hold On" (Alternative Take Mix)
4. "Hold On" (LP Version)

== Charts ==
Chart (1994)	Peak position
US Hot R&B/Hip-Hop Songs (Billboard)	66
