= Manifesto Records (UK) =

UK based dance music record sub label

Manifesto Records was a UK based dance music record sub label of Mercury Records which focused on dance music across all genres. The label began operations in 1994 with the first release being a remix of Donna Summer's "I Feel Love" (in which they got Summer to re-record vocals as the original masters had been lost in a fire).

The label had 13 Top 10 hits before being wound down in 2002 (a move partially brought about to "bottle the labels unique period because of its unprecedented success") as part of a rationalisation of dance music labels by parent company Universal Music which saw Manifesto, AM:PM and Serious brought together under the latter's name. The label was briefly resurrected by Mercury between 2004 - 2006.

The label was set up and headed by Eddie Gordon and Luke Neville who recruited Judge Jules as A&R. Jules would recruit Luke Neville. Ben Cherrill (who would later move to Positiva Records in 2001) also had an active role at the label, joining in 1998. Notable acts on the label included Todd Terry, Josh Wink, Byron Stingily, The Space Brothers, Yomanda and York. In 2000 the label set up a short lived subsidiary M-->Bargo.

Mercury Records would occasionally release promotional club remixes of some of its artists on Manifesto labelled 12"s, in particular for Dina Carroll, who released one single through the label, "Without Love" in 1999.

== Releases ==
=== Singles ===
Cat ref	Artist	Title	Year	UK Chart Position
FES1	Donna Summer	I Feel Love	1995	8
FES2				
FES3	Josh Wink	Higher State Of Consciousness	1995	8
FES4	Crystal Waters	Relax	1995	37
FES5	Q-Club	Tell It To My Heart	1996	28
FES6	Gusto	Disco's Revenge	1996	9
FES7	Donna Summer	State Of Independence	1996	13
FES8	Poltergeist	Vicious Circles	1996	32
FES9	Wink	Higher State Of Consciousness ('96 Remixes)	1996	7
FES10	E'voke	Arms Of Loren	1996	25
FES11	Todd Terry feat Martha Wash & Jocelyn Brown	Keep On' Jumpin'	1996	8
FES12	David Morales & The Bad Yard Club feat Crystal Waters & Delta	In De Ghetto	1996	35
FES13	Gusto	Let's All Chant	1996	21
FES14	Indo Aminata	Love Will Be on Your Side	1996	77
FES15	United Nations Project	United Nations Of House	1996	Did Not Chart
FES16	Tha Kid Chris	Feel Tha Vibe	1997	52
FES17	Boris Dlugosch pres Booom!	Keep Pushin'	1996	41
FES18	Blackbox	Native New Yorker	1997	46
FES19	Byron Stingily	Get Up (Everybody)	1997	14
FES20	Hondy	Hondy (No Access)	1997	26
FES21	Hole In One	Life's Too Short	1997	36
FES22	Sara Parker	My Love Is Deep	1997	22
FES23	The Space Brothers	Shine	1997	23
FES24	Loop Da Loop	Go With The Flow	1997	47
FES25	Todd Terry feat Martha Wash & Jocelyn Brown	Something Goin' On	1997	5
FES26	Various	House Of Orange EP	1997	Did Not Chart
FES27	Alex Neri	Planet Funk 2	1997	Did Not Chart
FES28	Gisele Jackson	Love Commandments	1997	54
FES29	Qwilo & Felix Da Housecat	Dirty Motha	1997	66
FES30	Kadoc	Rock The Bells	1997	34
FES31	Karen Ramirez	Troubled Girl	1998	50
FES32				
FES33	Janice Robinson	Earthbeat	1997	Did Not Chart
FES34	DJ Dero	The Horn (El Tren)	1997	Did Not Chart
FES35	Byron Stingily	Sing A Song	1997	38
FES36	The Space Brothers	Forgiven (I Feel Your Love)	1997	27
FES37	Todd Terry pres Shannon	It's Over Love	1997	16
FES38	Byron Stingily	You Make Me Feel (Mighty Real)	1998	13
FES39	Da Hool	Meet Her At The Love Parade	1998	15
FES40	Todd Terry	Ready For A New Day	1998	20
FES41	Trevor Reilly	Down With The Underground	1998	125
FES42	Byron Stingily	Testify	1998	48
FES43	Mr Spring	Voyager 1.56	1998	96
FES44	Karen Ramirez	Looking For Love	1998	8
FES45	José Padilla feat Angela John	Who Do You Love	1998	59
FES46	David Morales pres The Face	Needin' U	1998	8
FES47	Da Hool	Bora Bora	1998	35
FES48	The Cool The Fab & The Groovy pres Quincy Jones	Soul Bossa Nova	1998	47
FES49	Electribe 101	Talking With Myself '98	1998	39
FES50	Karen Ramirez	If We Try	1998	23
FES51	Untidy DJ's	Untidy Dubs presents Funky Groove	1998	89
FES52	Emmie	More Than This	1999	5
FES53	Loop Da Loop	Hazel	1999	20
FES54	Loop Da Loop feat M.C. Duke	Miracle Maker	1999	Did Not Chart
FES55	The Space Brothers	Legacy (Show Me Love)	1999	31
FES56				
FES57	Dina Carroll	Without Love	1999	13
FES58	Karen Ramirez	Lies	1999	Did Not Chart
FES59	Yomanda	Synth & Strings	1999	8
FES60	York	The Awakening	1999	11
FES61	The Space Brothers	Heaven Will Come	1999	25
FES62	Junior Sanchez feat Dajae	B With U	1999	31
FES63	Que Pasa	Dream On	1999	Did Not Chart
FES64	Taste Xperience feat Natasha Pearl	Summersault	1999	66
FES65	Progress pres The Boy Wunda	Everybody	1999	7
FES66	Byron Stingily	That's The Way Love Is	2000	32
FES67	The Space Brothers	Shina 2000	2000	18
FES68	Yomanda	Sunshine	2000	16
FES69	Rank 1	Airwave	2000	10
FES70	York	On The Beach/ Reachers Of Civilization	2001	4
FES71	Junkie XL	Zerotonine	2000	63
FES72	Spoiled & Zigo	More & More	2000	31
FES73	Yomanda	On The Level	2000	28
FES74				
FES75				
FES76	York	Farewell To The Moon	2001	37
FES77	Junkie XL	Bon Yoyage/ Power Of Big Slacks	2000	184
FES78	David Morales pres The Face feat Juliet Roberts	Needin' U II	2001	11
FES79	Dario G	Dream To Me	2001	9
FES80				
FES81	Plaything	Into Space	2001	48
FES82	Dario G	Say What's On Your Mind	2001	Did Not Chart
FES83	JamX + De Leon pres DuMonde	Never Look Back	2001	Did Not Chart
FES84	JBN	All I Want	2001	Did Not Chart
FES85	Da Hool	Meet Her At The Love Parade 2001	2001	11
FES86	The Space Brothers	Everywhere I Go	2001	Did Not Chart
FES87	Funkryders	Woman Of Angels	2001	Did Not Chart
FES88				
FES89	Logo feat Dawn Joseph	Don't Panic	2001	42
FES90	Mr Pink pres The Program	Love & Affection	2002	22
FES91	Mathias Ware feat Rob Taylor	Hey Little Girl	2002	42
852 865-1	Black Box	I Got The Vibration (A Positive Vibration)	1996	21
986 693-0	Royal Gigolos	California Dreamin'	2004	44
982 344-4	The Attic	Destiny	2004	Promo only
982 383-2	Salif Keita	Madan Exotic	2004	Did Not Chart
985 302-0	Plastic Dreams	Fuse (Move Your Body)	2004	Did Not Chart
986 638-9	Plummet	Cherish The Day	2004	35
986 671-8	Ron van den Beuken	Timeless (Keep On' Movin')	2004	65
987 056-4	C-Sixty Four	On A Good Thing	2005	54
987 147-9	Gadjo	So Many Times	2005	22
987 155-8	Thomas Falke	High Again (High On Emotion)	2005	55
987 158-1	C-Mos	2 Million Ways	2005	Did Not Chart
987 170-6	Jupiter Ace feat Shena	1000 years (Just Leave Me Now)	2005	51
987 297-4	Coco Bongo	Being Sunshine	2005	Did Not Chart
987 431-6	Todd Terry	Something Goin' On (2005 Mixes)	2005	Promo only
987 457 -9	Cream Vs The Hoxtons	Sunshine Of Your Love	2005	46
987 464-9	Black Fras	Moving Into Light	2005	Did Not Chart
987 482-4	Sex On Monday	Bring Back The Love	2005	Did Not Chart
987 780-6	Sunblock feat Robin Beck	First Time	2006	9
987 801-1	Chicane feat Tom Jones	Stoned In love	2006	7

=== Albums ===
Cat ref	Artist	Title	Year	UK Chart Position
536 076-2	Todd Terry	Ready For A New Day	1997	84
558 008-2	Byron Stingily	The Purist	1997	87
536 946-2	Karen Ramirez	Distant Dreams	1998	45
546 613-2	The Space Brothers	Shine	1999	Did Not Chart
542 799-2	Junkie XL	Big Sounds Of The Drags	2000	Did Not Chart
548 876-2	Dario G	In Full Colour	2001	Did Not Chart
N/A	Loop Da Loop	Album Sampler	1999	Promo Only

=== Promotional singles ===
Cat ref	Artist	Title	Year	Status
	Aardonn & DJ Dero	Banana Song/ La Campana	1995	Promo only
	Speedy Gonzalez	Pulp	1995	Promo only
	Dina Carroll	Mind Body & Soul	1996	Sampler
	Andy & The Lamboy	Dies Irae	1996	Promo only
	The Squad feat Prince Patric	Can U Feel It	1996	Promo only
	Tara	Work It Out	1997	Released by Mercury
	Dina Carroll	Run To You	1997	Sampler
	Wasis Diop/ John Martyn	No Sant/ Sunshine's Better	1997	Sampler
	Dina Carroll	Livin' For The Weekend	1998	Released by Mercury
	Kéllé	Higher Than Heaven	1999	Released by Mercury
	Dina Carroll	Say You Love Me	1999	Promo only
	One Track Mind	I Like U	2000	Promo only
	The Klub Family feat Sybil	When I Fall In Love	2000	Promo only
	Stone Phazers	John Wayne	2001	Promo only
	Dario G	Don't You Cry/ Flying	2001	Sampler
	Dina Carroll	Good To Me	2001	Sampler
	Dina Carroll	Someone Like You/ Good To Me/ Mind Body & Soul	2001	Released by Mercury
	Ray Hurley feat Cherubia	Devil In Disguise	2001	Promo only
	Praetorian	Released	2002	Did Not Chart
	Mellow Trax	How 2 Rock	2004	Promo Only
	Saint & Matteo Esse	You & Me (In Miami)	2004	Promo only
	Zoo Brazil feat Yota	Never Gonna Find A Love	2005	Promo only
	Rockefeller	Do It 2Nite	2006	Promo only

=== M-->Bargo releases ===
Cat ref	Artist	Title	Year	UK Chart Position
MGOX1	Spoiled & Zigo	More & More	2000	91
MGOX2	Unfair Justice	The Truth	2000	167
MGOX3	The Clergy	Saints & Sinners	2000	99
MGOX4	Area	Definition of Tekto	2000	140
