= Martine Syms =

American artist (born in 1988)

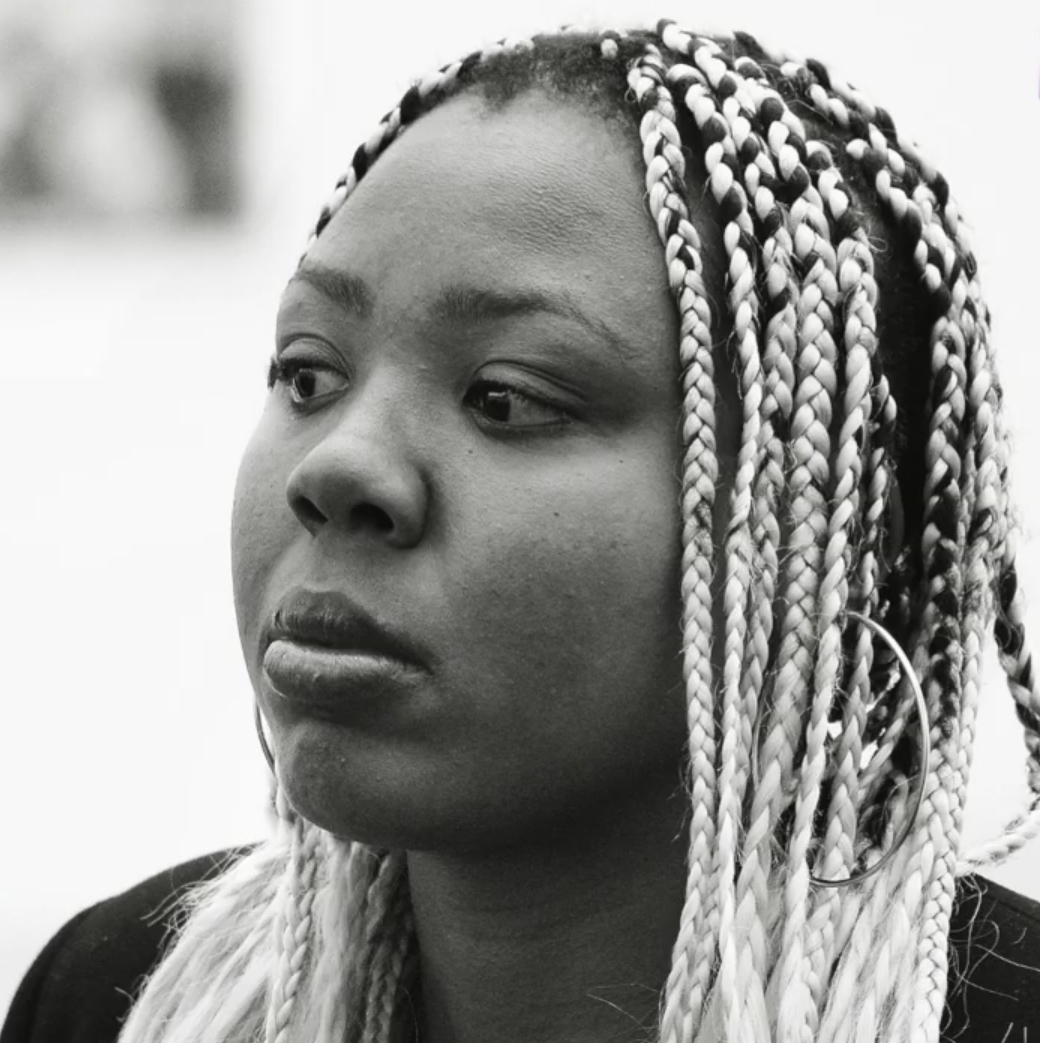
- Martine Syms
- Born: 1988 (age 37–38); Los Angeles, U.S.
- Education: School of the Art Institute of Chicago (BFA); Bard College (MFA)
- Occupations: Artist; filmmaker; critic; publisher
- Website: www.martinesy.ms

Martine Syms (born 1988) is an American artist residing in Los Angeles, specializing in various mediums including publishing, video, installation, and performance.

Her artistic endeavors revolve around themes of identity, particularly the representation of the self, with a focus on subjects like feminism and black culture. Syms frequently employs humor and social commentary as vehicles for exploration within her work. In 2007, she introduced the term "Conceptual Entrepreneur" to describe her artistic approach. Martine Syms is represented by Sadie Coles HQ and Sprüth Magers.

== Early life ==
Martine Syms was born in 1988 in Los Angeles. She grew up in the Altadena suburb of the city alongside her three siblings. During her formative years, she received homeschooling from her parents between the ages of 7 and 12. Recognizing her passion at a young age, Syms expressed her aspiration to become an artist early on. Reflecting on her homeschooling experience, Syms has commented on the challenges of accessing quality education in her area, stating, "The area I grew up in didn't have the best public schools, and it was hard to get all of us into the same private school—for a lot of racist reasons, from what it sounds like." Both of Syms' parents fostered her creative development, with her mother having an interest in art and writing and her father being an amateur photographer. During high school period, she participated in the California State Summer School for the Arts (CSSSA) at CalArts.

In 2007, Syms earned a Bachelor of Fine Arts (BFA) degree in film, Video, and New Media from the School of the Art Institute of Chicago. She later pursued a Master of Fine Arts (MFA) degree at Bard College in Annandale-on-Hudson, New York, completing her studies in 2017.

== Career ==
From 2007 to 2012, Syms was a co-director of Golden Age, an artist-run space in Chicago.

In 2015, Syms participated in the New Museum Triennial Surround Audience. During the same year, her video titled "Notes on Gesture" was exhibited at Bridget Donahue Gallery in New York City and the Machine Project in Los Angeles. The video delves into the significance of seemingly little bodily gestures in shaping one's identity.

Syms collaborated with Willo Perron and Associates in assisting with the writing of Kanye West's speech at the 2015 MTV Video Music Awards, where he announced his candidacy for the 2020 Presidential Election.

In 2016, Syms presented the performance piece "Misdirected Kiss" at the Storm King Art Center in New York's Hudson Valley, as well as at the Broad Museum in Los Angeles. The work's title is inspired by the 1904 film "The Misdirected Kiss." Incorporating elements reminiscent of a TED talk, the performance critically examines issues related to language and representation. In the same year, Syms held a solo exhibition at the Institute of Contemporary Arts in London, titled "Martine Syms: Fact & Trouble," which featured her video series "Lessons."

In 2017, Syms had a solo exhibition at the Museum of Modern Art in New York, titled "Projects 106: Martine Syms," which revolved around a feature-length film called "Incense, Sweaters & Ice." Additionally, Syms was shortlisted for the Future Generation Art Prize and received the Louis Comfort Tiffany Foundation grant in the same year. Syms joined the faculty of the California Institute of the Arts in September 2018 and was awarded the Graham Foundation Fellowship for Advanced Studies in the Fine Arts. She also received the Future Fields Commission in time-based media from the Philadelphia Museum of Art and the Fondazione Sandretto Re Rebaudengo.

Syms founded Dominica Publishing, an artists' press dedicated to exploring Black identity in contemporary art and visual culture.

In 2022, Syms made her directorial debut with the film The African Desperate, which premiered at the International Film Festival Rotterdam. The distribution rights for the film were acquired by the streaming service Mubi.

=== Conceptual Entrepreneur ===
The concept of artists seeking financial self-determination is a recurring theme in modern and contemporary art. Artists such as Marcel Duchamp, Marcel Broodthaers, Piero Manzoni, David Hammons, and Joe Scanlan have explored this idea. Scanlan, in particular, articulated this concept in his text "People in Trade," which highlights the business potential of conceptual art. Scanlan argues that artists with unique skills and production methods, such as Agnes Martin and David Hammons, embody personal branding, value-adding, and just-in-time production principles. These artists have often been overlooked for their contributions to state-of-the-art business innovations. Syms embraces the notion of self-determination through a sustainable institution, influenced by her interest in independent music and black-owned businesses. Her artwork has been showcased in various venues, including Human Resources, Bridget Donahue Gallery, the New Museum, Kunsthalle Bern, The Studio Museum in Harlem, Index Stockholm, MOCA Los Angeles, and MCA Chicago. Currently, Syms holds a teaching position at the California Institute of the Arts.

== Work ==
Syms' artistic practice delves into contemporary Black identity, queer theory, and the significance of language. Her exploration takes shape through various mediums such as video, performance, writing, etc. She often incorporates found footage from contemporary media to convey her thematic concerns. Syms values the concise nature of video as a means of transmitting important information and considers herself a collector of "orphaned media." For instance, she examines the role of smartphones as tools for constructing identity, even though she abstains from using social media. Syms finds enjoyment in exploring how self-constructed identities manifest through these platforms. In her artistic process, Syms frequently utilizes gallery spaces to create multimedia collages. She possesses diverse technical skills, including self-taught coding supplemented by classes at the Armory Center for The Arts in Los Angeles. Satire is a source of inspiration for Syms, employing parody and sarcasm to convey her artistic messages. She describes her working style as project-driven, adapting her approach throughout the creative journey.

== Publications ==
In 2011, Syms contributed to the Future Plan and Program project by publishing Implications and Distinctions. This publication examines the performance of black identity in contemporary cinema and was part of a collaborative effort led by Steffani Jemison.

In 2013, Syms published The Mundane Afrofuturist Manifesto on Rhizome. The manifesto advocates for black diasporic artistic producers to focus on creating culture that envisions a realistic future on Earth. Syms emphasizes the challenge of imagining a world without fantasy realms or escapism, urging a contemporary and futuristic perspective. Quoting DuBois and Ol' Dirty Bastard, she reflects on the notion of "twoness" and how it feels to be seen as a problem.

In 2014, Syms released Most Days, featuring a table read of her screenplay that depicts an average day in the life of a young black woman in 2050 Los Angeles. The album's score was composed by Neal Reinalda.

== Personal life ==
Syms participates in soccer as a player for Sativa Football Club, assuming the position of midfielder.

== Collections, Lectures and Exhibitions ==
=== Public Collections ===
- Art Institute of Chicago, Chicago IL, USA
- Carré d'Art, Musée d'art contemporain, Nîmes, France
- Guggenheim Museums and Foundation, New York NY, USA
- Hammer Museum, Los Angeles CA, USA
- Joan Flasch Artists' Book Collection, Flaxman Library, School of the Art Institute of Chicago IL, USA
- KADIST, Paris and San Francisco CA, USA
- Los Angeles County Museum of Art, Los Angeles CA, USA
- Leeds Art Gallery, Leeds, England
- Museum of Contemporary Art Chicago, Chicago IL, USA
- Museum of Contemporary Art, Los Angeles CA, USA
- Museum of Modern Art, New York NY, USA
- Museum of Modern Art Library, New York NY, USA
- Perez Art Museum, Miami FL, USA
- San Antonio Museum of Art, San Antonio TX, USA
- Serralves Foundation, Porto, Portugal
- Studio Museum in Harlem, New York NY, USA
- Walker Art Center, Minneapolis MN, USA
- Whitney Museum of American Art, New York NY, USA

=== Lectures and Conferences ===
- William Greaves: Psychodrama, Interruption, and Circulation, Lewis Center for the Arts, Princeton University, Princeton NJ, co-organized with Fia Backström, Feb 21, 2020
- with Colin Self, Sadie Coles HQ, London, Oct 1, 2018
- March Meeting 2018: Active Forms, Sharjah Art Foundation, Shuwaihen, Sharjah, UAE, Mar 17-19, 2018
- Experience It: Martine Syms, A conversation with Martine Syms, Sharon Hayes and Jon Rafman, The Lab with California College of the Arts, San Francisco CA, USA, February 26, 2018
- Lounge Talk, Yebisu International Festival for Art and Alternative Visions, Tokyo Photographic Museum, Tokyo, Japan, February 9, 2018
- Martine Syms and Rizvana Bradley in conversation, Raven Row, London, England, April 23, 2017
- Friday Flights at the Getty, Getty Center, Los Angeles CA, USA, August 26, 2016
- Martine Syms, Todd Madigan Gallery & Department of Art at California State University, Bakersfield CA, USA, February 16, 2016
- Tip of Her Tongue: Martine Syms 'Misdirected Kiss', The Oculus Hall at The Broad, Los Angeles CA, USA, January 21, 2016
- A Pilot For A Show About Nowhere, PNCA Mediatheque, Portland OR, USA, May 12, 2015
- Seven on Seven, 7th Edition: Empathy & Disgust, Rhizome, New York NY, USA, May 2, 2015
- Lessons of the Tradition, California State University at Long Beach, Long Beach CA, USA, 2015
- Quality Television, Light Industry, New York NY, USA April 28, 2015
- Lessons of the Tradition, Pomona College, Claremont CA, USA, 2015
- Nite Life, O, Miami Poetry Festival, Miami FL, USA, 2015
- In the Archives, Contemporary Artists Books, Los Angeles CA, USA, 2015
- Lessons of the Tradition, Virginia Commonwealth University, Richmond VA, USA, 2014
- Black Radical Imagination II, REDCAT, Los Angeles CA, USA, November 14, 2014
- Black Vernacular: Lessons of the Tradition, London College of Communication, London, England, October 17, 2014
- Do You Follow? Art in Circulation, Rhizome/ICA Institute of Contemporary Art London, London, England, Oct 15-17, 2014
- Black Vernacular: Lessons of the Tradition, Oberlin College & Observatory, Oberlin OH, USA, April 29, 2014
- Most Days, Moogfest Biennial, Asheville NC, USA, April 26, 2014
- Black Vernacular, Insights 2014 Design Lecture Series, Walker Art Center, Minneapolis MN, USA, March 18, 2014
- Direct Design, Minneapolis College of Art and Design, Minneapolis MN, USA, 2014
- Most Days, Arts Incubator, University of Chicago, Chicago IL, USA, 2014
- Direct Design, Otis College of Art and Design, Los Angeles CA, USA, 2014
- Becoming Artists: Critique, Originality & Identity - Managing Biography: Negotiating Audience, Yale University, New Haven CT, USA, February 8, 2014
- New Paradigms in Digital Media 'Mainstreaming' a DIY Culture, Johns Hopkins University, Baltimore MD, USA, April 13, 2013
- Conceptual Entrepreneurism, Maryland Institute College of Art, Baltimore MD, USA, 2013
- Black Vernacular: Reading New Media, SXSW, Austin TX, USA, 2013
- Science Fiction & What It Feels Like To (Already) Live In the Future, Actual Size, Los Angeles CA, January 11, 2013
- Real Talk, California Institute of the Arts, Valencia CA, USA, November 5, 2012
- Reading Politics, Summer Forum, Chicago IL, USA, 2012
- The Didactic Possibilities of Film Titles, Houston Museum of African American Art, Houston TX, USA, 2011
- Artist/Authors, The Gregory School, Houston TX, USA, 2011
- Implications & Distinctions, Project Row Houses, Houston TX, USA, 2011
- Future Plan and Program - Lecture by Steffani Jemison and Martine Syms, Prairie View A & M University, Prairie View TX, USA, April 19, 2011

=== Solo exhibitions ===
- Armory Center for the Arts (Pasadena, CA), Martine Syms, The Queen's English, 2014
- Locust Projects (Miami), Art on the Move: Nite Life, 2015
- White Flag Projects (Saint Louis, Missouri), Martine Syms, 2015
- Machine Project (Los Angeles, CA), Notes on Gesture, 2015
- Bridget Donahue (New York), Martine Syms: Vertical Elevated Oblique, 2015
- Audain Gallery (Vancouver, Canada), Borrowed Lady, 2016
- Human Resources (Los Angeles), Martine Syms: Black Box, 2016
- Karma International (Beverly Hills, California), Martine Syms: com port ment, 2016
- Institute of Contemporary Art (London, England), Martine Syms: Fact & Trouble, 2016
- Museum of Modern Art (New York), Projects 106: Martine Syms, 2017
- Camden Arts Centre (London, England), VNXXCAS: Martine Syms, 2017
- CONDO: Bridget Donahue hosted by Sadie Coles HQ (London, England), The Easy Demands, 2017
- Bridget Donahue (New York), Martine Syms: Big Surprise, 2018
- Graham Foundation (Chicago IL), Incense Sweaters & Ice, 2018
- Art Institute of Chicago (Chicago IL), SHE MAD: Laughing Gas, 2018
- Sadie Coles HQ (London, England), Grand Calme, 2018
- Serralves Foundation (Porto, Portugal), Contemporary Projects: Martine Syms, 2018
- Secession (Vienna, Austria), Boon, 2019
- Institute of Contemporary Art at Virginia Commonwealth University (Richmond VA), Shame Space, 2019
- Sadie Coles HQ off-site: 24 Cork Street (London, England), Ugly Plymouths, 2020
- SLAM | Saint Louis Art Museum (St. Louis MO), New Media Series, 2020
- 5239 Melrose Avenue (Los Angeles CA), New York, and Sadie Coles HQ (London, England), Ugly Plymouths, presented by Bridget Donahue, 2020
- Bergen Kunsthall (Bergen, Norway), 2021

=== Group exhibitions ===
- The Green Gallery (Milwaukee), YOU CAN DEPEND ON THE SUNSHINE: Paul Cowan, Marco Kane, Martine Syms, 2007
- New Museum (New York), Museum as Hub: Alpha's Bet Is Not Over Yet, 2011
- MCA Chicago, We Are Here: Art & Design Out of Context, 2011
- The Green Gallery (Milwaukee), Three Card Monte, 2011
- Public Fiction (Los Angeles), Act II: The Props, 2012
- Institute of Contemporary Art (Philadelphia), First Among Equals, 2012
- Badlands Unlimited, Apple iTunes, How to Download a Boyfriend, 2012
- Acid Rain TV (New York), The Didactic Possibilities of Film Titles, 2012
- Young Art (Los Angeles), Mise-En-Scéne, 2012
- Transfer Gallery (New York), gURLs, 2013
- Aran Cravey (Los Angeles), Rhetoric, 2014
- New Museum (New York), First Look: Martine Syms: Reading Trayvon Martin, 2014
- 356 Mission (Los Angeles), Another Cats Show, 2014
- REDCAT (Los Angeles), Small New Films, 2014
- Cooper Union (New York), Black Radical Imagination, 2014
- Studio Museum (Harlem, New York), Speaking of People: Ebony, Jet and Contemporary Art, 2014–2015
- Project Row Houses (Houston, Texas), How We Work, 2015
- Todd Madigan Gallery (California State University), Open House, 2015
- ACTRE TV acretv.org, Tele-novela, 2015
- Chan Gallery, Pomona College (Claremont), Candice Lin/Martine Syms, 2015
- ICA Institute of Contemporary Art London (London, England), Artists' Film Club: Avant-Noir, Volume 2, 2015
- Bureau (New York), The Daily Show, 2015
- Walker Art Center (Minneapolis), Intangibles, 2015
- New Museum (New York), 2015 Triennial: Surround Audience, 2015
- The Coming Community, Artspace NZ (Auckland, New Zealand), Potentially Yours, 2016
- Astrup Fearnley Museet (Oslo, Norway), Los Angeles - A Fiction, 2016
- Galerie Conradi (Hamburg, Germany), Umwelt Inversion, 2016
- Oakville Galleries (Oakville, Canada), Down To Write You This Poem Sat, 2016
- Occidental Temporary (Paris, France), Cool Memories, 2016
- International Center of Photography (New York), Public, Private, Secret, 2016
- Hammer Museum (Los Angeles), Made in L.A. 2016: a, the, though, only
- Atlanta Contemporary (Atlanta), It Can Howl, 2016
- HOME (Manchester, England), Imitation of Life: Melodrama and Race in the 21st Century, 2016
- Whitechapel Gallery (London, England), Electronic Superhighway (2016-1966), 2016
- Index Stockholm- The Swedish Contemporary Art Foundation (Stockholm, Sweden), Autobiography, 2016
- Franklin Street Works (Stamford), Cut-Up: Contemporary Collage and Cut-Up Histories through a Feminist Lens, 2016
- K11 Art Foundation pop-up space (Hong Kong), .COM/.CN, presented by K11 Art Foundation and Klaus Biesenbach and Peter Eleey, 2017
- Museum of Art, Architecture and Technology (Lisbon, Portugal), Electronic Superhighway (2016-1966), 2017
- ICA Institute of Contemporary Art Philadelphia (Philadelphia), Speech/Acts, 2017
- Artspace (Sydney, Australia), The Public Body, 2017
- The Mistake Room (Los Angeles), Analog Currency, 2017
- Chateau Shatto (Los Angeles), At This Stage, 2017
- Palazzo Contarini Polignac (Venice, Italy), Future Generation Art Prize @ Venice 2017, organised by the Victor Pinchuk Foundation, 2017
- The Kitchen (New York), That I am reading backwards and into for a purpose, to go on:, 2017
- Trinity Square Video (Toronto, Canada), What does one do with such a clairvoyant image?, 2017
- Raven Row (London, England), 56 Artillery Lane, 2017
- Galerie PCP (Paris, France), Our Words Return in Patterns (Part 1), 2017
- Whitney Museum (New York), Whitney Biennal, as part of the John Riepenhoff installation, 2017
- Musée d'art Contemporain de Lyon (Lyon, France), Los Angeles - A Fiction, 2017
- Pinchuk Art Centre (Kyiv, Ukraine), Exhibition of 21 Artists Shortlisted for the Future Generation Art Prize 2017, 2017
- Public Art Fund (New York), Commercial Break, 2017
- Dazibao (Montreal, Canada), I Am the Organizer of My Own Archive, 2017
- Team Gallery (New York), The Love Object (organized by Tom Brewer), 2017
- University of Michigan Museum of Art (Ann Arbour MI), Art in the Age of the Internet, 1989 To Today, 2018
- Madre museo d'arte contemporanea Donnaregina (Naples, Italy), Per_forming a collection. The Show Must Go_ON, 2018
- FRONT International: Cleveland Triennial For Contemporary Art, Toby Devan Lewis Gallery, Museum of Contemporary Art Cleveland, An Evening of Queen White, 2018
- Gwangju (South Korea), The 12th Gwangju Biennale Exhibition: Imagined Borders, 2018
- Grunwald Gallery, School of Art, Architecture + Design (Bloomington IN), Out of Easy Reach, 2018
- Kunstverein (Amsterdam, the Netherlands), Succession Sounds, 2018
- Whitney Museum of American Art (New York), Eckhaus Latta: Possessed, 2018
- Allen Memorial Art Museum (Oberlin OH), Radically Ordinary: Scenes form Black Life in America Since 1968, 2018
- Art Basel (Basel, Switzerland), Unlimited, 2018
- The Gallery, Michael's (Santa Monica CA), 2018
- Gallery 400 and DePaul Art Museum (Chicago IL), Out of Easy Reach, 2018
- Kadist Foundation (Paris, France), This is Utopia, to Some, 2018
- A Lone, installed adjacent to Capitol Hill Link rail station within city-wide project, Seattle WA, 2018
- Gordon Robichaux (New York), A Page from My Intimate Journal (Part 1), 2018
- Tokyo Photographic Art Museum (Tokyo, Japan), Yebisu International Festival for Art and Alternative Visions 2018, Mapping the Invisible, 2018
- ICA Institute of Contemporary Art Boston (Boston MA), Art in the Age of the Internet, 1989 to Today, 2018
- The Shed (New York), Manual Override, 2019
- Yuz Museum (Shanghai, China), tongewölbe T25 (Ingolstadt, Germany), In Production: Art and the Studio System, 2019
- Stony Island Arts Bank (Chicago IL), In the Absence of Light: Gesture, Humor and Resistance in The Black Aesthetic: Selections from the Beth Rudin DeWoody Collection, 2019
- Yerba Buena Center for the Arts (San Francisco CA), The Body Electric, 2019
- Luma Westbau, (Zürich Switzerland), It's Urgent! – Part II, 2019
- Gladstone Gallery (New York), Dry Land, 2019
- Hammer Museum (Los Angeles), Celebration of Our Enemies: Selections from the Hammer Contemporary Collection, 2019
- Los Angeles, The Foundation of the Museum: MOCA's Collection, Museum of Contemporary Art, 2019
- R & Company (New York), Chairs Beyond Right & Wrong, 2019
- Whitney Museum of American Art (New York), Whitney Biennial 2019, 2019
- Schinkel Pavillon (Berlin, Germany), Straying from the Line, 2019
- FuturDome (Milan, Italy), Hypertimes, 2019
- Lismore Castle Arts (Waterford, Ireland), Palimpsest, 2019
- Walker Art Centre (Minneapolis MN), The Body Electric, 2019
- ICA Institute of Contemporary Art at University of Pennsylvania (Philadelphia PA), Colored People Time: Mundane Futures, 2019
- MDC MOAD Miami Dade College Museum of Art and Design (Miami FL), The Body Electric, 2020
- The Luminary online (St. Louis MO), Self Maintenance Resource Center 2020, 2020
- TOWER MMK, MMK Frankfurt, (Frankfurt am Main Germany), Sammlung, 2020
- Gucci x Daelim Museum (Seoul, South Korea), No Space, Just a Place. Eterotopia, 2020
- Auckland Art Gallery (Auckland, New Zealand), Honestly Speaking: The Word, the Body and the Internet, 2020
- de Young Museum (San Francisco CA), Uncanny Valley: Being Human in the Age of AI, 2020
- Princeton University (Princeton NJ), William Greaves, Sondra Perry, Martine Syms, organized by Martine Syms, 2020
- MIT List Visual Arts Center (Cambridge MA), Colored People Time: Mundane Futures, Quotidian Pasts, Banal Presents, 2020
- Mary Porter Sesnon Art Gallery, UC University California Santa Cruz (Santa Cruz CA), We Are Not Aliens: Arthur Jafa, Martine Syms, and Afro-Futurism 2.0, as part of Beyond the End of the World: Approaches in Contemporary Art Seminar, 2020
