= Rindon Johnson =

American artist and writer (born 1990)

Rindon Johnson in 2022

Rindon Johnson (born 1990, California) is an American artist, poet and writer. Johnson has based his work on language and its slippery nature. He uses animal hides, animation, virtual reality, wood and vaseline to consider capital accumulation and the systemic violences that maintain it. Johnson has exhibited his sculptures and videos internationally in Europe, the United States, and Australia, and is a published author. As of 2026, Johnson is a faculty member and associate chair of painting at the Milton Avery Graduate School of the Arts at Bard College.

== Early life and education ==
Johnson was born in the unceded territory of the Ohlone peoples, in San Francisco, CA in 1990. He is an alumnus of the Department of Photography and Imaging (DPI) in the NYU Tisch School of the Arts and received his MFA from Bard College.

== Works ==
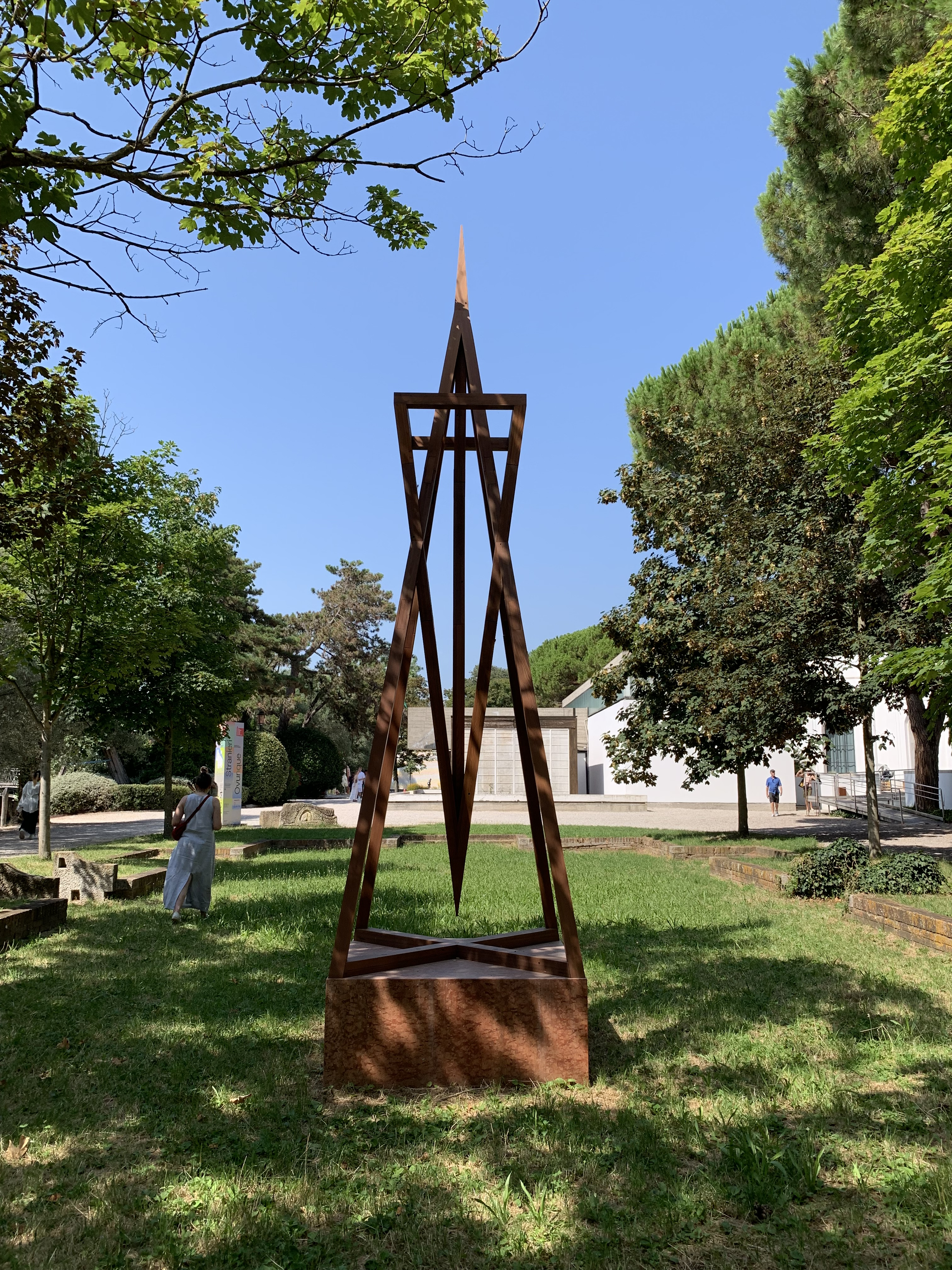
Installation view La Biennale di Venezia 2024, Rindon Johnson, Coeval Proposition #1: Tear down so as to make flat with the Ground or The *Trans America Building DISMANTLE EVERYTHING 2021-ongoing

Johnson is the author of several books including The Law of Large Numbers, published by SculptureCenter, Chisenhale Gallery and Inpatient Press in 2021, the chapbook, No One Sleeps Better Than White People, published by Inpatient Press, and the virtual reality e-book, Meet in the Corner. In 2017, Johnson collaborated with multidisciplinary artist Ser Serpas on Shade the King, a book of stream-of-consciousness-inspired poems by Johnson and abstract drawings by Serpas, published by Capricious.

In 2024, Johnson participated in the 60th International Art Exhibition of the Venice Beinnale, curated by Adriano Pedrosa. In 2024, Johnson presented his largest solo exhibition to date, Best Synthetic Answer, at the Rockbund Art Museum in Shanghai, China. His work has been shown internationally, including solo presentations at Albertinum, Dresden (2022), SculptureCenter in New York (2021), and the Julia Stoschek Collection in Düsseldorf (2019).

Johnson has written for a number of online and print art publications such as The Brooklyn Rail, Cultured Magazine, Hyperallergic, and Artforum and has lectured on art and theory at Bruce High Quality Foundation University, Princeton, UdK Berlin and UCLA.

== Exhibitions ==
Solo exhibitions

- Find Spot, Kunsthall Bergen, Bergen, Norway, 2025
- Seven Whale Road, Cibrián, San Sebastián, Spain, 2025
- Why tell a dead man the future, CC Strombeek, Brussels, Belgium, 2025
- Best Synthetic Answer, Rockbund Museum - Shanghai, China, 2024
- Five, Max Goelitz, Berlin, Germany, 2023-24
- Andromache Freya Rocket Suki Nomad Pete Kimmy Z River Chloe Ali Robert Maple Tigger Theodosia Martha Nate, COMA Gallery, Sydney, New South Wales, Australia, 2023
- The Bells Pursuing One Another, Albertinum, Dresden, Germany, 2022
- Cuvier, Francois Ghebaly, New York, New York, New York, USA, 2022
- Law of Large Numbers: Our Bodies, SculptureCenter, Long Island City, New York, USA, 2021
- Law of Large Numbers: Our Selves, Chisenhale Gallery, London, United Kingdom, 2021
- The Valley of the Moon, Francois Ghebaly, Los Angeles, California, USA, 2021
- Circumscribe, Julia Stoschek Collection, Düsseldorf, Germany, 2019
- Well, Covered, AALA Gallery, Los Angeles, California, USA, 2018
- A Din, A Hand, Beacon Sacramento, Sacramento, California, USA, 2017
- Existential Hangover, The Guest Room IRL at The Museum of Human Achievement, Austin, Texas, USA, 2017

Selected Collaborative Exhibitions

- Lifes, The Hammer Museum, Los Angeles, California, USA, 2022
- Unlock the Gates! Span the Mouth!, Sophie Tappenier, Vienna, Austria, 2022
- This End The Sun, New Museum, New York, New York, USA, 2021
- A Cultivated Life, King's Leap, Brooklyn, New York, USA, 2018
- Or Else the Women Play the Game, Stellar Projects, New York, New York, USA, 2018

Selected group exhibitions

- Hard Art, MoMA PS1, New York, New York, USA, 2026
- Close to the Clouds: Encountering Digital Diasporas, Bemis Center for Contemporary Arts, Omaha, Nebraska, USA, 2026
- eva hesse, lukas heerich, rindon johnson, max goelitz, Munich, Germany, 2026
- Emotional Terrains of Change, Simian, Copenhagen, Denmark, 2025
- Accumulation – On Collecting, Growth and Excess, Second Sequence, Migros Museum für Gegenwartskunst, Zürich, Switzerland, 2025
- Stranieri Ovunque / Foreigners Everywhere, La Biennale di Venezia, Venice, Italy, 2024
- Poetics of Encryption, KW Institute of Contemporary Art, Berlin, Germany, 2024
- Some of It Falls from the Belt and Lands on the Walkway Beside the Conveyor, Vleeshal, Middelburg, Netherlands, 2022
- Quiet as it's Kept, Whitney Biennial, Whitney Museum, New York, New York, USA, 2022
- Get Rid of Yourself, Sophie Tappeiner, Vienna, Austria, 2020
- Materia Medica, Francois Ghebaly Gallery, Los Angeles, USA, 2020
- Searching the Sky for Rain, SculptureCenter, New York, New York, USA, 2019
- Radical Reading Room, The Studio Museum in Harlem, New York, New York, USA, 2019
- Nobody Promised You Tomorrow, Brooklyn Museum, Brooklyn, New York, USA, 2019
- TOUCHING FROM A DISTANCE, Literaturhaus, Berlin, Germany, 2018
- States of Play: Roleplaying Reality, FACT, Liverpool, United Kingdom, 2018
- New Black Portraitures, curated by Aria Dean, Rhizome, Online, 2017
- NGV Triennial, National Gallery of Victoria, Melbourne, Australia, 2017
- The Unframed World, HeK (Haus der elektronischen Künste), Basel, Switzerland, 2017
