= Ten City =

American R&B and house music act

- (left to right): Burke, Stingily, Lawson (1994)

Background information
- Also known as: Ragtyme
- Origin: Chicago, Illinois, U.S.
- Genres: House, R&B
- Years active: 1987–1996; 2021–present
- Labels: Atlantic, EastWest Records America, Columbia, Ultra Music
- Members: Byron Stingily; Marshall Jefferson
- Past members: Byron Burke; Herb Lawson

Ten City (derived from intensity) is an American, Chicago, Illinois-based R&B and house music act, that enjoyed a number of club hits and Urban radio hits in the late 1980s and early 1990s and was one of the first exponents of deep house.

== Biography ==
Formerly known as Ragtyme, the group comprised vocalist Byron Stingily, guitarist Herb Lawson and keyboardist Byron Burke and were augmented by producer Marshall Jefferson. The group was signed by Atlantic Records and released the album Foundation in 1989, which became the group's only album to cross over, peaking at No. 49 on the US Top R&B/Hip-Hop Albums chart.

Ten City is best known for the singles "Devotion", "Right Back to You" and "That's the Way Love Is," which hit No. 1 on the US dance chart and No. 8 on the UK Top 40 in 1989. Stingily, who left the group and became a successful solo artist, re-recorded the song and brought it back to No. 1 on the US dance chart in 1999.

In 2021, Stingily teamed up with producer Marshall Jefferson to release "Be Free" on Ultra Music, the first single in 25 years to be credited to Ten City. Its parent album, Judgment, was nominated for a Grammy Award that year in the category of Best Dance/Electronic Album.

== Discography ==
=== Studio albums ===
| Year | Album | Label | Peak chart positions | | Certifications |
| Year | Album | Label | US R&B | UK | Certifications |
|---|---|---|---|---|---|
| 1989 | Foundation | Atlantic Records | 49 | 22 | BPI: Silver |
| 1990 | State of Mind | Atlantic Records | — | — | |
| 1992 | No House Big Enough | EastWest Records America | — | — | |
| 1994 | That Was Then, This Is Now | Columbia Records | — | — | |
| 2021 | Judgment | Ultra Records | — | — | |
| 2023 | Love Is Love | Helix Records | — | — | |
"—" denotes releases that did not chart or were not released in that territory.

=== Compilation albums ===
- The Best of Ten City (Ibadan, 2001)

=== Singles ===
| Year | Single | Peak chart positions | | | |
| Year | Single | US Dance | US R&B | UK | IRE |
|---|---|---|---|---|---|
| 1987 | "Devotion" | — | — | — | — |
| 1988 | "Right Back to You / One Kiss Will Make It Better" | 8 | — | 80 | — |
| 1989 | "Funny Love" | — | ― | — | — |
| 1989 | "That's the Way Love Is" | 1 | 12 | 8 | 11 |
| 1989 | "Devotion" (re-release) | 17 | — | 29 | 22 |
| 1989 | "Where Do We Go?" | 28 | 34 | 60 | — |
| 1989 | "Suspicious" | — | — | — | — |
| 1990 | "Whatever Makes You Happy" | 16 | 53 | 60 | — |
| 1990 | "Superficial People" | 22 | — | 96 | — |
| 1990 | "I Should Learn to Love You" | ― | — | ― | — |
| 1992 | "Only Time Will Tell" / "My Peace of Heaven" | 2 | ― | 63 | — |
| 1993 | "Fantasy" | 20 | ― | 45 | — |
| 1994 | "The Way You Make Me Feel" | — | ― | — | — |
| 1994 | "Goin' Up in Smoke" | 21 | ― | ― | — |
| 1996 | "Nothing's Changed" | — | ― | — | — |
| 1996 | "All Loved Out" | ― | ― | ― | — |
| 2021 | "Be Free" | ― | ― | ― | — |
| 2021 | "On It" | ― | ― | ― | — |
| 2022 | "Piece of My Heart" | ― | ― | ― | — |
| 2022 | "A Girl Named Phil" | ― | ― | ― | — |
| 2022 | "Love Is Love" | ― | ― | ― | — |
| 2023 | "I Love Me" | ― | ― | ― | — |
"—" denotes releases that did not chart or were not released in that territory.

== See also ==
- List of number-one dance hits (United States)
- List of artists who reached number one on the U.S. dance chart
