= Through the Rain (Tanya Blount song) =

Single by Tanya Blount

from the album Natural Thing
- Released: June 28, 1994
- Recorded: 1993–1994
- Genre: R&B; soul
- Length: 5:09
- Label: Polydor
- Songwriters: K. Jackson; E. White; B. Williams
- Producers: Kevin "K-Jack" Jackson; Erik "Lil Rik" White; Paul Laurence

Tanya Blount singles chronology
"I'm Gonna Make You Mine" (1994)	"Through the Rain" (1994)	"Hold On" (1994)

"Through the Rain" is a song by American recording artist Tanya Blount. Released as the second single from her debut album Natural Thing, it peaked at number 90 on the Billboard Hot 100.

== Track listing ==
CD single

No.	Title	Writer(s)	Producer	Length
1.	"Through the Rain" (Radio Edit)	K. Jackson, E. White, B. Williams	Kevin "K-Jack" Jackson, Erik "Lil Rik" White, (Co.) Paul Laurence	3:58
2.	"Through the Rain"	K. Jackson, E. White, B. Williams	Kevin "K-Jack" Jackson, Erik "Lil Rik" White, (Co.) Paul Laurence	5:09

Cassette single

No.	Title	Writer(s)	Producer	Length
1.	"Through the Rain"	K. Jackson, E. White, B. Williams	Kevin "K-Jack" Jackson, Erik White, Erik "Lil Rik" White, (Co.) Paul Laurence	5:09
2.	"Through the Rain" (Radio Edit)	K. Jackson, E. White, B. Williams	Kevin "K-Jack" Jackson, Erik White, Erik "Lil Rik" White, (Co.) Paul Laurence	3:58

Maxi-single
Through the Rain (The Remixes)

No.	Title	Writer(s)	Producer	Length
1.	"Through the Rain" (2 A.M. Mix Edit W/Dialogue)	K. Jackson, E. White, B. Williams	Kevin "K-Jack" Jackson, Erik "Lil Rik" White, (Co.) Paul Laurence, La Ron Style, Leon High, R.H. Groove	4:05
2.	"Through the Rain" (2 A.M. Mix Edit W/O Dialogue)	K. Jackson, E. White, B. Williams	Kevin "K-Jack" Jackson, Erik "Lil Rik" White, (Co.) Paul Laurence, La Ron Style, Leon High, R.H. Groove	4:06
3.	"Through the Rain" (Down Home Mix Edit)	K. Jackson, E. White, B. Williams	Kevin "K-Jack" Jackson, Erik "Lil Rik" White, (Co.) Paul Laurence, La Ron Style, Leon High, R.H. Groove	3:50
4.	"Through the Rain" (2 A.M. Extended)	K. Jackson, E. White, B. Williams	Kevin "K-Jack" Jackson, Erik "Lil Rik" White, (Co.) Paul Laurence, La Ron Style, Leon High, R.H. Groove	4:54
5.	"Through the Rain" (Down Home Mix Extended)	K. Jackson, E. White, B. Williams	Kevin "K-Jack" Jackson, Erik "Lil Rik" White, (Co.) Paul Laurence, La Ron Style, Leon High, R.H. Groove	4:36
6.	"Through the Rain" (2 A.M. Mix Instrumental)	K. Jackson, E. White, B. Williams	Kevin "K-Jack" Jackson, Erik "Lil Rik" White, (Co.) Paul Laurence, La Ron Style, Leon High, R.H. Groove	4:54
7.	"Through the Rain" (Down Home Mix Instrumental)	K. Jackson, E. White, B. Williams	Kevin "K-Jack" Jackson, Erik "Lil Rik" White, (Co.) Paul Laurence, La Ron Style, Leon High, R.H. Groove	3:49
8.	"Through the Rain" (2 A.M. Acappella)	K. Jackson, E. White, B. Williams	Kevin "K-Jack" Jackson, Erik "Lil Rik" White, (Co.) Paul Laurence, La Ron Style, Leon High, R.H. Groove	4:54

12" vinyl

Side one
No.	Title	Writer(s)	Producer	Length
1.	"Through the Rain" (2 A.M. Mix Extended)	K. Jackson, E. White, B. Williams	Kevin "K-Jack" Jackson, Erik "Lil Rik" White, (Co.) Paul Laurence, La Ron Style, Leon High, R.H. Groove	4:54
2.	"Through the Rain" (2 A.M. Mix Instrumental)	K. Jackson, E. White, B. Williams	Kevin "K-Jack" Jackson, Erik "Lil Rik" White, (Co.) Paul Laurence, La Ron Style, Leon High, R.H. Groove	4:54
3.	"Through the Rain"	K. Jackson, E. White, B. Williams	Kevin "K-Jack" Jackson, Erik "Lil Rik" White, (Co.) Paul Laurence	5:09

Side two
No.	Title	Writer(s)	Producer	Length
4.	"Through the Rain" (Down Home Mix Extended)	K. Jackson, E. White, B. Williams	Kevin "K-Jack" Jackson, Erik "Lil Rik" White, (Co.) Paul Laurence, La Ron Style, Leon High, R.H. Groove	4:36
5.	"Through the Rain" (Down Home Mix Instrumental)	K. Jackson, E. White, B. Williams	Kevin "K-Jack" Jackson, Erik "Lil Rik" White, (Co.) Paul Laurence, La Ron Style, Leon High, R.H. Groove	3:49
6.	"Through the Rain" (2 A.M. Acappella)	K. Jackson, E. White, B. Williams	Kevin "K-Jack" Jackson, Erik "Lil Rik" White, (Co.) Paul Laurence, La Ron Style, Leon High, R.H. Groove	4:54

== Charts ==
Chart (1994)	Peak position
US Billboard Hot 100	90
US Hot R&B/Hip-Hop Songs (Billboard)	27
US Adult R&B Songs (Billboard)	21
