= Tanya Trotter =

American actress, author and musician

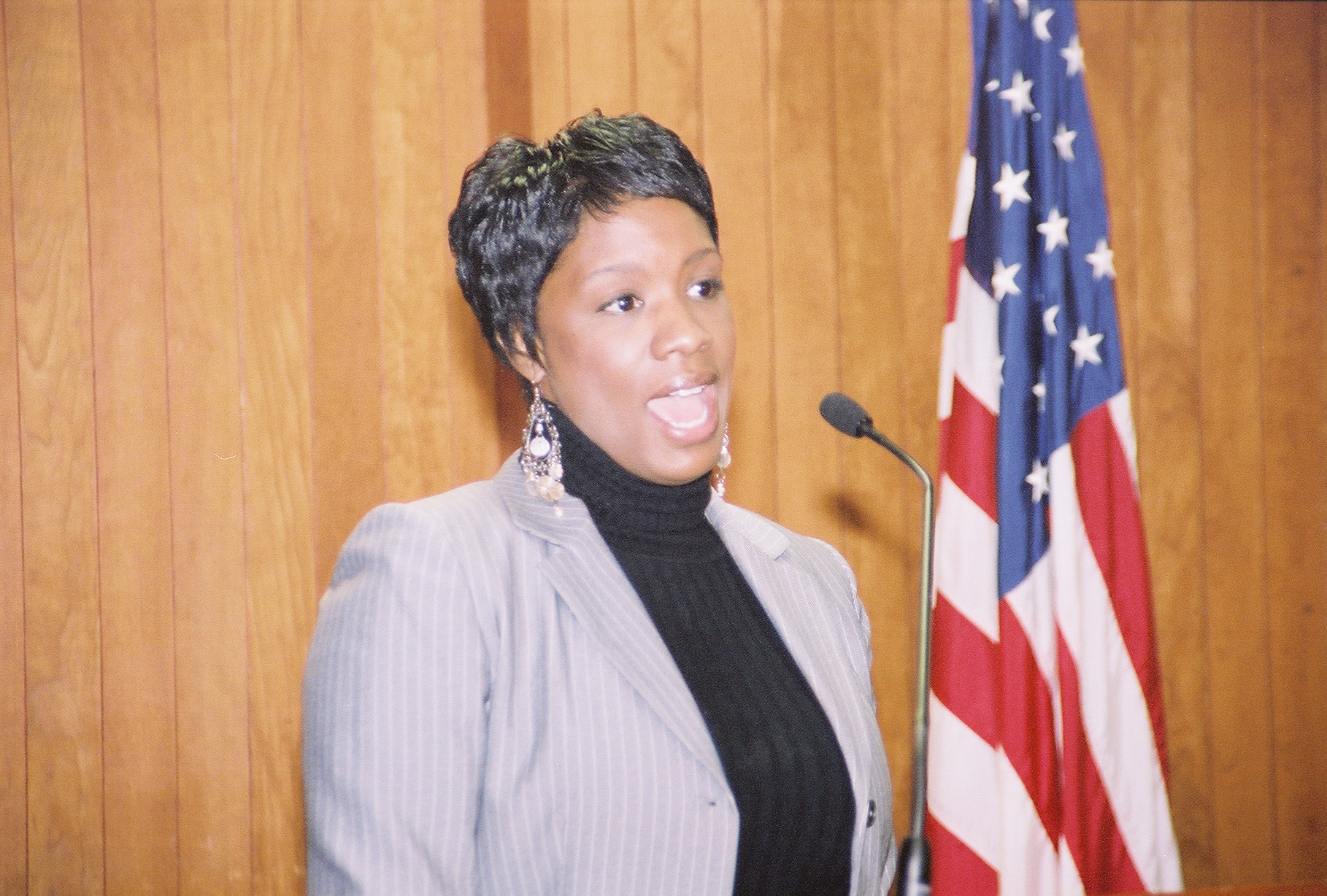
- Trotter in 2007

Background information
- Born: Tanya Blount
- Origin: Washington, D.C., U.S.
- Genres: R&B; soul; folk; gospel
- Occupations: Actress; singer; author
- Years active: 1993–present
- Labels: Polydor; Bad Boy
- Member of: The War and Treaty

Tanya Trotter (née Blount) is an American actress, musician and author. She began her career as a teen actress, appearing in the film Sister Act 2: Back in the Habit (1993), where she performed "His Eye Is on the Sparrow" in a duet with Lauryn Hill. She went on to release her debut album Natural Thing (1994), which featured the songs "Through the Rain" and "I'm Gonna Make You Mine". Blount is currently one half of the country music duo the War and Treaty.

== Early life and education ==
Blount was born to an Afro-Panamanian mother and African-American father. She attended Baptist services on Sundays and attended Catholic school, singing in choirs in both contexts. She was educated at Morgan State University, where she majored in psychology and sang in the university choir.

== Career ==
Blount first came to prominence in the film, Sister Act 2: Back in the Habit (1993) in which she featured as the character "Tanya". Her performance of "His Eye is on the Sparrow" with Lauryn Hill was a particularly notable moment. MadameNoire commented, 'she and R&B/Hip-hop musician Lauryn Hill captivated audiences with a memorable performance'. Blount also appeared on the feature film's original soundtrack album.

Signed with Polydor Records during late 1993, her debut album, Natural Thing, was released in 1994 and peaked at number 58 on the US R&B/Hip-Hop Albums chart. The album's first single "I'm Gonna Make You Mine" peaked at number 57 on the USR&B/Hip-Hop Songs chart. "Through the Rain" followed, peaking at number 27 on US R&B/Hip-Hop Songs and became her first appearance on the US Hot 100 where it peaked at number 90. Third single, "Hold On" peaked at number 66 on the US R&B/Hip-Hop Songs chart. In 1994, Blount released a holiday single titled "Remember Love". In 1995, Blount received a nomination for Best New Artist at the Soul Train Awards.

In 1996, Blount signed to Sean Combs' Bad Boy Entertainment and commenced the recording of her second album; writing for herself and other Bad Boy artists. Though Combs was involved in the project initially, interest in the album 'flagged'. Though years passed, only 2 songs; "I Love Him" and "The Last Time We Made Love", were released. According to EBONY, Blount was included on the label's first gospel LP alongside artists; B.I.G., Faith Evans, Brandy, Carl Thomas, John P. Kee, Brian McKnight, Boyz II Men and Total. Commenting on the album, Blount explained "“I think Puffy is looking for a different way to go; he feels a responsibility to the Big Willies and hustlers to understand. A lot of people from the streets have a strong background in church. Maybe it’s time to send the message that they can party and still love Jesus.” Originally scheduled for release in 1997, the album was shelved indefinitely. In February 2000, the Washington Post reported Blount was pursuing a release from her contract with Bad Boy Entertainment and negotiating a settlement.

Blount has had a consistent musical theatre career in productions including What Every Woman Wants, Sneaky, Preacher's Kids, Born to Sing! and Christmas in Washington. In 2008, Blount's song "Right Here", was featured in the 2008 Tyler Perry film, The Family That Preys.

In 2016, Blount released the duet album Love Affair with her husband, Michael Trotter Jr., as Trotter & Blount. The duo also released the single "Hi Ho" that year as the War and Treaty. "Hi Ho" was described by Paste writer Chris Estey as "the break out soul hit". In 2017, the War and Treaty released the EP Down to the River, described as a mix of "blues, gospel, soul, bluegrass, country" and heralded by Estey as "a splendidly made immediate classic about conflict and redemption." In 2018, Rolling Stone reported that the War and Treaty's debut album Healing Tide was due for release on August 10, 2018, describing the lead single as a "joyfully relentless title track, reminiscent of classic Ike and Tina Turner rock-infused soul." On September 25, 2020, the War and Treaty released their sophomore album, Hearts Town, on Rounder Records.

== Personal life ==
Trotter is married to her bandmate Michael Trotter and has a son named Antonio.

== Discography ==
=== Studio albums ===
List of albums, with selected chart positions
Title	Album details	Peak chart positions			
Title	Album details	US Curr. Sales	US Heat.	US Indie	US R&B /HH
Natural Thing	Released: 1994; Label: Polydor; Format: CD, cassette	–	– (Note: Natural Thing did not enter the Billboard Heatseekers Albums, but peaked at number 7 on the Billboard Heatseekers Albums - East North Central chart.)	–	58
Love Affair (as Trotter and Blount)	Released: 2016; Label: Seven49Group; Format: Digital download	–	–	–	–
Healing Tide (as The War and Treaty)	Released: August 10, 2018; Label: Strong World Entertainment (marketed and distributed by Thirty Tigers); Format: LP, CD, Digital download	–	11	26	–
Hearts Town (as The War and Treaty)	Released: September 25, 2020; Label: The War and Treaty Corporation (under exclusive license to Rounder Records and distributed by Concord Music Group); Format: LP, CD, Digital download	70	–	–	–
Lover's Game (as The War and Treaty)	Released: March 10, 2023; Label: UMG Nashville; Format: LP, CD, Digital download	–	–	–	–
Plus One (as The War and Treaty)	Released: February 14, 2025; Label: UMG Nashville; Format: LP, CD, Digital download	–	–	–	–

=== Live albums ===
List of extended plays
Title	Album details
Live at Blue House (as The War and Treaty)	Released: January 21, 2015; Format: CD, Digital download

=== Extended plays ===
List of extended plays
Title	Album details
Live on WMNF 88.5 with Amy Snider (as The War and Treaty)	Released: 2016; Format: Digital download
Down to the River (as The War and Treaty)	Released: 2017; Label: Strong World Entertainment; Format: Digital download

=== Singles ===
as lead artist

List of singles as a lead artist, with selected chart positions, sales figures and certifications
Title	Year	Chart positions				Album
Title	Year	US	US R&B /HH	US Adult R&B	UK	Album
"I'm Gonna Make You Mine"	1994	—	57	34	85	Natural Thing
"Through the Rain"	1994	90	27	21	—	Natural Thing
"Hold On"	1994	—	66	—	—	Natural Thing
"Remember Love"	1994	—	—	—	—	Special Gift
"I Love Him" (featuring Mase)	2000	—	—	—	—	non-album single

as featured artist

List of singles as a featured artist, with selected chart positions, sales figures and certifications
Title	Year	Chart positions				Album
Title	Year	US	US R&B /HH	US Adult R&B	UK	Album
"Freedom (Theme from Panther)"	1995	45	18	34	—	Panther: The Original Motion Picture Soundtrack

as The War and Treaty

List of singles as a lead artist, with selected chart positions, sales figures and certifications
Title	Year	Chart positions	Album
Title	Year	US Triple A	Album
"Hi Ho"	2016	—	Down to the River
"Healing Tide"	2018	—	Healing Tide
"Are You Ready to Love Me?"	2018	—	Healing Tide
"Jealousy / Hustlin'"	2020	—	Hearts Town
"We Are One"	2020	—	Hearts Town
"Five More Minutes"	2020	22	Hearts Town

=== Album appearances ===
Title	Year	Artist(s)	Album
"Remember Love"	1996	Tanya Blount	Special Gift (Holiday compilation by Polydor Records)
"I Love Him"	1998	Tanya Blount	Nothin' But The Hotness In '98 (Compilation by Bad Boy Entertainment)
"The Last Time We Made Love"	1999	Tanya Blount	Bad Boy Entertainment Presents: Emotional (Compilation EP by Bad Boy Entertainment)
"Been Changed"	2007	7 Sons of Soul (feat. Tanya Blount)	Witness

=== Soundtrack appearances ===
Title	Year	Artist(s)	Album
"Oh Happy Day"	1993	St. Francis Choir	Sister Act 2: Back in the Habit: The Motion Picture Soundtrack
"His Eye Is On The Sparrow"	1993	Tanya Blount and Lauryn Hill	Sister Act 2: Back in the Habit: The Motion Picture Soundtrack
Joyful, Joyful"	1993	St. Francis Choir (featuring Devin Kamin, Lauryn Hill, Ron Johnson, Ryan Toby)	Sister Act 2: Back in the Habit: The Motion Picture Soundtrack
"Ain't No Mountain High Enough"	1993	Cast and Whoopi Goldberg	Sister Act 2: Back in the Habit: The Motion Picture Soundtrack
"Freedom (Theme from Panther)"	1995	Various: Aaliyah, Felicia Adams, May May Ali, Amel Larrieux, Az-Iz, Blackgirl, Mary J. Blige, Tanya Blount, Brownstone, Casserine, Changing Faces, Coko, Tyler Collins, N'Dea Davenport, E.V.E., Emage, En Vogue, Eshe & Laurneá (of Arrested Development), Female, For Real, Penny Ford, Lalah Hathaway, Jade, Jamecia, Jazzyfatnastees, Queen Latifah, Billy Lawrence, Joi, Brigette McWilliams, Milira, Miss Jones, Cindy Mizelle, Monica, Me’Shell NdegéOcello, Natasha, Pebbles, Pure Soul, Raja-Nee, Brenda Russell, SWV, Chantay Savage, Sonja Marie, Tracie Spencer, Sweet Sable, TLC, Terri & Monica, Vybe, Crystal Waters, Caron Wheeler, Karyn White, Vanessa Williams, Xscape, Y?N-Vee, Zhané	Panther: The Original Motion Picture Soundtrack
"Right Here"	2008	Tanya Blount	The Family That Preys

=== Writing credits ===
Title	Year	Artist(s)	Album
"I Love Him"	2000	Tanya Blount	Nothin' But The Hotness In '98 and Bad Boy 2000 (Compilations by Bad Boy Entertainment)
"Right Here"	2008	Tanya Blount	The Family That Preys

== Filmography ==
- Sister Act 2: Back in the Habit (1993) - Tanya

== Published works ==
- Through the Rain 40 Principles for Surviving Life's Challenges

== Awards ==
- 1995: nominee, Soul Train Music Award, Best New Artist
- 2019: winner, Americana Music Award for Emerging Artist of the Year (with The War and Treaty)
