= Byron Stingily (American football) =

American football player (born 1988)

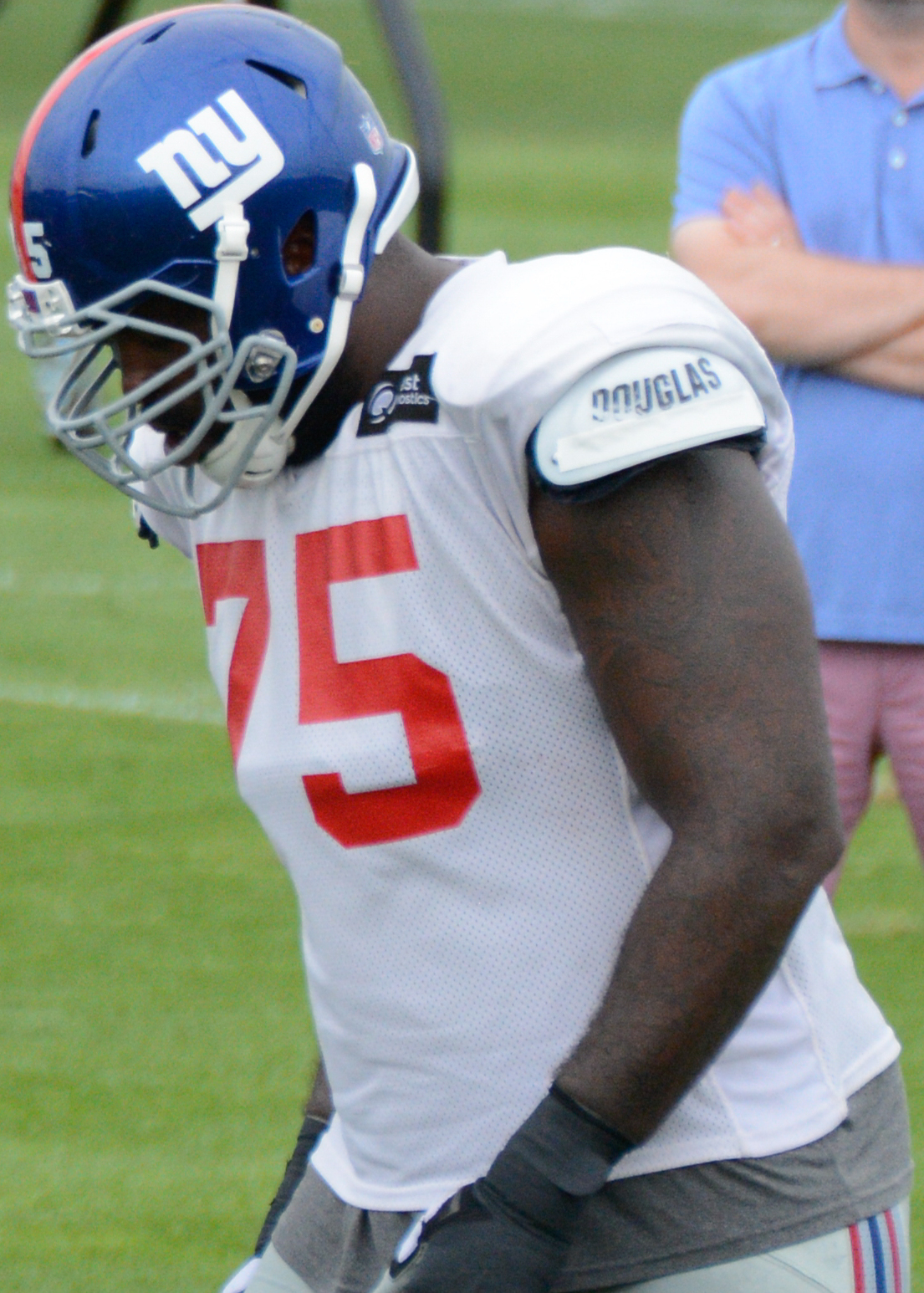
- Stingily with the New York Giants in 2016

No. 68
- Position: Offensive tackle

Personal information
- Born: September 9, 1988 (age 38); Chicago, Illinois, U.S.
- Listed height: 6 ft 5 in (1.96 m)
- Listed weight: 318 lb (144 kg)

Career information
- High school: Romeoville (Romeoville, Illinois)
- College: Louisville
- NFL draft: 2011: 6th round, 175th overall pick

Career history
- Tennessee Titans (2011–2014); Pittsburgh Steelers (2015); New York Giants (2016)

Awards and highlights
- Second-team All-Big East (2010)

Career NFL statistics
- Games played: 20
- Games started: 9
- Stats at Pro Football Reference

Byron Andrew Stingily Jr. (born September 9, 1988) is an American former professional football player who was an offensive tackle in the National Football League (NFL). He was selected by the Tennessee Titans in the sixth round of the 2011 NFL draft. He played college football for the Louisville Cardinals. He is the son of house music singer Byron Stingily.

== College career ==
Stingily began attending Joliet Junior College after graduating from Romeoville High School. He started 13 games at offensive tackle for Joliet and lead them to an 11–2 record. After the season, he was voted the best offensive lineman in his conference and the 8th best player. After playing for Joliet Junior College from 2006 to 2007, Stingily would commit to play for the Louisville Cardinals. Before joining the Cardinals, Stingily bulked up, adding on 65 pounds.

Stingily redshirted his first season at the University of Louisville in 2008. The next year, he would begin missing spring training in order to recover from surgery. His first start with the team came against Indiana State. After starting 11 games at offensive tackle, Stingily then sat out the last game of the season against Rutgers University with an injury.

== Professional career ==
Pre-draft measurables
Height	Weight	40-yard dash	10-yard split	20-yard split	20-yard shuttle	Three-cone drill	Vertical jump	Broad jump	Bench press
6 ft 5 in (1.96 m)	313 lb (142 kg)	4.95 s	1.69 s	2.87 s	4.48 s	7.60 s	27.5 in (0.70 m)	9 ft 2 in (2.79 m)	25 reps
All values from Pro Day

=== Tennessee Titans ===
On April 30, 2011, Stingily was selected by the Tennessee Titans in the sixth round, 175th overall, in the 2011 NFL draft.

Stingily became an unrestricted free agent on March 10, 2015, and was resigned by the Titans on March 19. Stingily was signed in order to fill in the vacant right tackle position after the Titans had released their former starter, Michael Oher. He received a 2-year, $2.25 million contract, with a signing bonus of $250,000.

It was reported on September 5, 2015, that Stingily had been released by the Titans before final roster cuts. He played in 20 games with 9 starts throughout his 4-year career with Tennessee.

=== Pittsburgh Steelers ===
On October 19, 2015, Stingily was signed by the Pittsburgh Steelers to add depth to their left tackle position after Kelvin Beachum suffered a torn acl that would end the rest of his 2015 season.

=== New York Giants ===
Stingily signed with the New York Giants on April 11, 2016. On August 30, 2016, he was placed on injured reserve. On September 20, 2016, he was released from injured reserve.

== Personal life ==
Byron Stingily was born on September 9, 1988, to Byron and Sandra Stingily. His father is a house music singer from Chicago and is currently a school principal. He also has a younger brother named Cameron who previously played at running back for Northern Illinois University and was a member of the Pittsburgh Steelers.
