= Byron Burke =

American record producer

Byron E. Burke, also known as Popâ Ur-Mää, is an American record producer/DJ, who has worked in the music industry for over thirty years. He served as the Co-Executive Vice President of the music division for Prelude Music & Film Works that released the 1998 motion picture Lost In Space for New Line Cinema, as well as co-writing and producing music for artists on Atlantic Records, East West Records, MAW Records, Nervous Records, Strictly Rhythm Records, Capitol Records, Universal Records and Columbia Records.

By the age of 19, Burke became the Vice President for Burstinglaw Music Productions in Chicago, Illinois.

Burke was the creative force behind Ten City, an early 1990s dance group that established them as one of the pioneers of house music. He co-wrote and produced two albums entitled Foundation and State of Mind for Atlantic Records, one album entitled No House Big Enough for East West Records and one album entitled That Was Then, This Is Now for Columbia Records. The records spawned ten Top 20 Billboard magazine dance songs, five Top 10 Billboard Magazine Sales Chart Singles, ten UK Singles Chart singles, a Gold Album from South Africa and a Silver Album from the UK that received international acclaim on four continents.

In 2021, Ten City was nominated for a Grammy Award for Best Dance/Electronic Album, solidifying their enduring influence and marking a significant return to the dance music landscape.

Beyond his music career, Byron leads Popâ Ur-Mää Global Consulting Enterprise, a firm that has provided marketing services for prestigious luxury brands such as Rolls-Royce, Bugatti, Lamborghini, and Breitling. The firm is also dedicated to supporting social causes.

== Ministry ==
On December 16, 2001, Burke became a member of the Body of Christ at Living Word Christian Center in Forest Park, Illinois. By May 2003, Burke began conducting weekly online bible teachings on AOL & Yahoo chatrooms with individuals and groups in the United States, the United Kingdom, Germany, India, and Africa.
