= I'm Gonna Make You Mine (Tanya Blount song) =

Single by Tanya Blount

from the album Natural Thing
- Released: February 2, 1994
- Recorded: 1993–1994
- Genre: Soul; R&B
- Length: 4:47
- Label: Polydor
- Songwriter(s): M. Williams; J. McAllister; Chantay Savage
- Producer(s): Steve "Silk" Hurley; Christian

Tanya Blount singles chronology
"I'm Gonna Make You Mine" (1994)	"Through the Rain" (1994)

"I'm Gonna Make You Mine" is a song released on February 2, 1994, by American R&B singer Tanya Blount. It is the lead single from her debut album, Natural Thing. The song peaked to No. 57 on the Billboard R&B Singles chart.

== Track listing ==
I'm Gonna Make You Mine Promo CD Single

1. I'm Gonna Make You Mine (DJ Eddie F Mix) [4:00]
2. I'm Gonna Make You Mine (Christian's Mix) [4:11]
3. I'm Gonna Make You Mine (Steve "Silk" Hurley Mix) [4:26]

== Critical reception ==
Billboard called it a "hip-swaying pop/funk jam (that) ushers a promising new vocalist into the urban radio fold. Chunky beats click respectably, while Blount vamps with ample range and confidence. She is clearly inspired by a solid song that is strengthened by a catchy sing-along chorus. A mixed bag of sturdy remixes aims for street juice, club approval and mature audience acceptance—and should succeed greatly. An enticing peek into Blount's "Natural Thing" debut."

== Charts ==
Chart (1994)	Peak position
UK Singles (OCC)	85
US Hot R&B/Hip-Hop Songs (Billboard)	57
US Adult R&B Songs (Billboard)	34
