= Byron Stingily =

American R&B and house-music singer

- Origin: Chicago, Illinois, United States
- Genres: House, garage house
- Occupation: Singer
- Years active: 1987–present
- Labels: Nervous Records; Defected Records; Atlantic Records; Columbia/SME Records; Manifesto Records (UK)

Byron Stingily is an American R&B and house-music singer born in Chicago, Illinois, known for his falsetto voice. He is now a part-time principal at a school in Chicago while still performing.

== Career ==
Stingily had several hit records in the 1980s and 1990s as the lead singer of Ten City. As a solo artist, he had his biggest success on the US Billboard Hot Dance Club Play chart, where he hit No. 1 three times. In 1997 he spent a week in the top spot with "Get Up (Everybody)" where he sampled Sylvester's "Dance (Disco Heat)", then hit No. 1 again in 1998 with a remake of Sylvester's "You Make Me Feel (Mighty Real)", produced by Damien Mendis and Stuart Bradbury.

"That's the Way Love Is," a No. 1 dance hit in 1989 for Ten City, brought him to No. 1 again in 1999 when he re-recorded it on his own. Some of his recent singles have been released on the UK-based record label Defected Records.

In 2021, he teamed up with producer Marshall Jefferson to release "Be Free", the first single in 25 years to be credited to Stingily's house music group Ten City.

== Discography ==
=== Albums ===
Year	Album	Label	UK
1998	The Purist	Nervous Records	87
2000	Club Stories	Nervous Records	—
"—" denotes releases that did not chart.

=== Singles ===
Year	Song	Peak chart positions	
Year	Song	US Dance	UK
1996	"Don't Fall in Love"	41	—
1996	"Love You the Right Way"	28	—
1997	"Get Up (Everybody)"	1	14
1997	"Flying High"	27	—
1997	"Sing a Song"	19	38
1998	"You Make Me Feel (Mighty Real)"	1	13
1998	"Testify"	20	48
1999	"That's the Way Love Is"	1	32
2000	"Why Can't You Be Real"	9	—
2000	"Stand Right Up"	6	—
2001	"U Turn Me" (featuring Leee John)	10	99
"—" denotes releases that did not chart.

== Personal life ==
Stingily is the father of visual artist and poet Diamond Stingily and professional athlete Byron, who played offensive tackle in the NFL for 5 years ending his career with the New York Giants in 2016.

== See also ==
- List of Billboard number-one dance club songs
- List of artists who reached number one on the U.S. Dance Club Songs chart
