= List of hi-NRG artists and songs =

Hi-NRG is uptempo disco or electronic dance music usually featuring synthetic bassline octaves. This list contains some examples of hi-NRG artists and songs. Hi-NRG songs by non-hi NRG artists are also included.

Contents
Artists • Songs (1970s • Early 1980s • Mid- to late 1980s • 1990s • 2000s • 2000s) • Albums • References

== Songs ==
=== 1970s ===
Year	Artist	Song	Label
1977	Donna Summer	"I Feel Love"	Casablanca / GTO
1978	Patrick Hernandez	"Born to Be Alive"	Aquarius
1978	Amanda Lear	"Follow Me	Ariola
1978	Peter Jacques Band	"Fly with the Wind"	Ariola
1978	Sylvester	"You Make Me Feel (Mighty Real)"	Fantasy
1979	Jessica Williams	"They Call Me the Queen of Fools"	Polydor
1979	Viola Wills	"Gonna Get Along Without Ya Now"	Hansa

=== Early 1980s ===
Year	Artist	Song	Label
1980	Donna Summer	"Sunset People"	Casablanca
1980	Viola Wills	"If You Could Read My Mind"	Hansa
1981	Boys Town Gang	"Remember Me / Ain't No Mountain High Enough"	Moby Dick
1981	Patrick Cowley	"Get a Little"	Megatone
1981	Patrick Cowley	"Megatron Man"	Megatone
1981	Patrick Cowley	"Menergy"	Fusion
1981	Carol Jiani	"Hit 'N Run Lover"	Matra
1981	Lime	"Your Love"	Matra
1982	Claudja Barry	"Work Me Over"	Jupiter
1982	Patrick Cowley	"Goin' Home"	Megatone
1982	Divine	"Native Love (Step By Step)"	"O"
1982	The Flirts	"Passion"	"O"
1982	Roni Griffith	"Spys"	Vanguard
1982	Lime	"Babe, We're Gonna Love Tonight"	Mantra
1982	Nazia Hassan	"Boom Boom"	Saregama-His Master's Voice
1982	Man Parrish	"Heatstroke"	Rams Horn
1982	Paul Parker	"Right on Target"	Megatone
1982	Q-Feel	"Dancing in Heaven (Orbital Be-Bop)"	Jive
1982	Donna Summer	"I Feel Love" (Patrick Cowley Remix)	Casablanca
1982	Sylvester	"Do Ya Wanna Funk"	Megatone
1982	The Weather Girls	"It's Raining Men"	CBS (UK)
1982	Viola Wills	"Stormy Weather"	Sunergy
1983	Claudja Barry	"For Your Love"	Personal
1983	Miquel Brown	"So Many Men, So Little Time"	Record Shack
1983	Dead or Alive	"Misty Circles" (Dance Mix)	Epic
1983	Hazell Dean	"Searchin' (I Gotta Find a Man)"	Proto
1983	Divine	"Shoot Your Shot"	"O"
1983	Fun Fun	"Happy Station"	X-Energy
1983	Frankie Goes to Hollywood	"Relax"	ZTT
1983	New Order	"Blue Monday"	Factory
1983	William Onyeabor	"Good Name"	Wilfilms
1983	Sylvester	"Don't Stop"	Megatone
1983	Trans-X (Pascal Languirand)	"Living on Video"	Polydor Records

=== Mid- to late 1980s ===
Year	Artist	Song	Label
1984	Agents Aren't Aeroplanes	"The Upstroke"	Proto (UK)
1984	Bronski Beat	"Smalltown Boy"	London
1984	Bronski Beat	"Why?"	London
1984	Dead or Alive	"You Spin Me Round (Like a Record)"	Epic
1984	Hazell Dean	"Whatever I Do (Wherever I Go)"	Proto (UK)
1984	Divine	"You Think You're a Man"	Proto
1984	Fancy	"Get Lost Tonight"	Metronome
1984	Fancy	"Slice Me Nice"	Metronome
1984	The Flirts	"Helpless (You Took My Love)"	Telefon
1984	Frankie Goes to Hollywood	"Two Tribes"	ZTT
1984	Fun Fun	"Colour My Love"	X-Energy
1984	Fun Fun	"Give Me Your Love"	X-Energy
1984	Sylvester	"Rock the Box"	Megatone
1984	Evelyn Thomas	"High Energy"	Record Shack (UK)
1984	Kim Wilde	"The Second Time"	MCA
1984	Kim Wilde	"The Touch"	MCA
1985	Bronski Beat	"Hit That Perfect Beat"	London
1985	Alaska y Dinarama	"Un hombre de verdad"	Hispavox
1985	Bronski Beat	"Run from Love" / "Hard Rain"	London
1985	Bronski Beat and Marc Almond	"I Feel Love"	London
1985	Divine	"Walk Like a Man"	Proto
1985	Madleen Kane	"I'm No Angel"	TSR
1985	New Order	"Sub-culture"	Factory Records
1985	Madleen Kane	"On Fire"	TSR
1985	Lime	"Unexpected Lovers"	Mantra
1985	Barbara Pennington	"Vertigo"	Record Shack
1985	People Like Us	"Reincarnation (Coming Back For Love)"	Passion (UK)
1985	Sinitta	"So Macho"	Fanfare (UK)
1985	Suzy Q	"Computer Music"	J.C.
1985	Taffy	"I Love My Radio"	Ibiza (Italy) / Transglobal (UK)
1985	Village People	"Sex Over the Phone"	Casablanca
1985	Betty Wright	"Sinderella"	Jamaica
1986	Bananarama	"Venus"	London
1986	Claudja Barry	"Down and Counting"	Epic
1986	The Communards	"Don't Leave Me This Way"	London
1986	Alaska y Dinarama	"¿A quien le importa?"	Hispavox
1986	Dead or Alive	"Something in My House"	Epic
1986	Man 2 Man and Man Parrish	"Male Stripper"	Bolts
1986	Stacey Q	"Two of Hearts"	Atlantic
1986	Evelyn Thomas	"How Many Hearts"	Record Shack
1986	Kim Wilde	"You Keep Me Hangin' On"	MCA
1987	Bona-Riah	"House of the Rising Sun"	Rise
1987	The Communards	"Never Can Say Goodbye"	London
1987	Paul Lekakis	"Boom Boom (Let's Go Back to My Room)"	ZYX / Polydor
1987	New Baccara	"Call Me Up"	Bellaphon
1987	Click	"Duri Duri (Baila Baila)"	Discos Musart
1987	Pet Shop Boys	"Always on My Mind"	Parlophone
1987	Taffy	"Step by Step"	Transglobal
1987	Taylor Dayne	"Tell It to My Heart"	Arista
1987	Kylie Minogue	"I Should Be So Lucky"	PWL
1988	Erasure	"Knocking on Your Door"	Mute / Sire
1988	Kim Wilde	"Never Trust a Stranger"	MCA
1988	Erasure	"Stop!"	Mute / Sire
1988	Kylie Minogue	"The Loco-Motion"	PWL
1988	New Baccara	"Fantasy Boy"	Bellaphon
1988	Raffaella Carrà	"No pensar en ti"	CBS
1988	Quantize	"The Sun Ain't Gonna Shine Anymore"	Passion
1989	Boy	"Broken Wings"	Flea
1989	Eartha Kitt and Bronski Beat	"Cha Cha Heels"	Arista
1989	New Baccara	"Touch Me"	Bellaphon
1989	Quantize	"You've Lost That Lovin' Feeling"	Passion
1989	Donna Summer	"I Don't Wanna Get Hurt"	Warner Bros.
1989	Donna Summer	"This Time I Know It's for Real"	Warner Bros.
1989	Donna Summer	"Whatever Your Heart Desires"	Atlantic / PWL

=== 1990s ===
Year	Artist	Song	Label
1990	Quantize	"Stop! In the Name of Love"	Passion
1991	Pet Shop Boys	"Where the Streets Have No Name (I Can't Take My Eyes off You)"	Parlophone / EMI
1991	Quantize feat. Adrienne	"Yesterday Once More"	Passion
1992	Erasure	"Take a Chance on Me"	Mute
1993	Abigail	"Constant Craving"	ZYX
1993	Abigail	"Losing My Religion"	ZYX
1993	Cappella	"U Got 2 Know"	ZYX
1993	Cappella	"U Got 2 Let the Music"	ZYX
1993	Frankie Goes to Hollywood	"Relax" (Jam & Spoon HI N-R-G Remix)	ZTT
1993	Real McCoy	"Another Night"	Hansa
1994	Abigail	"Smells Like Teen Spirit"	ZYX
1994	Blur	"Girls & Boys" (Pet Shop Boys 12" Remix)	Food / Parlophone
1994	Cappella	"Move on Baby"	ZYX
1994	Kym Mazelle & Jocelyn Brown	"No More Tears (Enough Is Enough)"	Arista
1994	Fancy	"Long Way to Paradise"	Koch International
1994	Fancy	"Wait by the Radio"	Koch International
1994	Nicki French	"Total Eclipse of the Heart"	Bags of Fun / Mega
1995	Nicki French	"Did You Ever Really Love Me"	Love This
1995	Nicki French	"For All We Know"	Bags of Fun
1995	Karel	"Live to Tell"	Jellybean
1995	Outta Control	"Tonight It's Party Time"	Interhit
1996	Gina G	"Ooh Aah... Just a Little Bit"	Eternal
1996	Johnna	"Do What You Feel"	PWL International
1997	Miquel Brown	"It's a Sin"	Infinity
1997	Cappella	"Be My Baby"	ZYX
1997	France Joli	"Breakaway"	Jellybean
1997	Karel	"I Am"	Jellybean
1997	Pet Shop Boys	"Somewhere"	Parlophone / Atlantic

=== 2000s ===
Year	Artist	Song	Label
2000	A Touch of Class (ATC)	"Around the World (La La La La La)"	King Size
2003	The Knife	"Listen Now"	Rabid
2004	Jimmy Somerville	"Come On"	Sony BMG
2005	Scissor Sisters	"Filthy/Gorgeous"	Universal (US); Polydor (worldwide)
2005	Madonna	"Hung Up"	Warner
2005	Madonna	"Future Lovers"	Warner Records
2006	Moby feat. Debbie Harry	"New York, New York"	Mute
2007	Bloc Party	"Flux"	Wichita
2007	Sophie Ellis-Bextor	"China Heart"	Fascination
2007	Róisín Murphy	"Cry Baby"	EMI
2007	Britney Spears	"Heaven on Earth"	Jive / Zomba
2008	Anastacia	"Heavy Rotation"	Mercury
2008	Donna Summer	"I'm a Fire"	Burgundy
2009	Bananarama	"Dum Dum Boy"	Fascination
2009	Bananarama	"Love Comes"	Fascination
2009	Sally Shapiro	"Save Your Love"	Permanent Vacation
2009	Shakira	"She Wolf"	Epic
2009	Silver Columns	"Brow Beaten"	Silver Columns
2009	Selena Gomez & the Scene	"Naturally"	Hollywood

=== 2010s & 2020s ===
Year	Artist	Song	Label
2011	Britney Spears	"I Wanna Go"	Jive
2011	Rihanna	"S&M"	Def Jam / SRP
2011	Katy Perry	"Last Friday Night (T.G.I.F.)"	Capitol
2011	Kim Wilde	"Remember Me"	Columbia SevenOne
2012	Pet Shop Boys	"A Face Like That"	Parlophone
2012	Marina Diamandis	"Homewrecker"	679/Atlantic
2013	Club 8	"Stop Taking My Time"	Labrador
2013	Pet Shop Boys	"Axis"	x2
2013	Pet Shop Boys	"Love Is a Bourgeois Construct"	x2
2013	Sally Shapiro	"All My Life"	Paper Bag Records
2013	Shit Robot feat. JENR	"Feels Real"	DFA
2014	Todd Terje	"Delorean Dynamite"	Olsen
2014	Orange Caramel	"Catallena"	Pledis/Kakao M
2015	Belle and Sebastian	"Enter Sylvia Plath"	Matador
2017	Dua Lipa	"New Rules (Initial Talk Remix)"	Warner Records
2019	Madonna	"God Control"	Interscope
2020	Jessie Ware	"Save a Kiss"	Virgin EMI Records
2020	Dua Lipa	"Physical"	Warner Records
2020	Jessie Ware	"Soul Control"	Virgin EMI Records
2022	Sally Shapiro	"Fading Away"	Italians Do It Better
2023	Nuovo Testamento	"Heat"	Avant Records
2025	Marina Diamandis	"Cuntissimo"	Queenie Records

== Albums ==
- 1981: Patrick Cowley – Megatron Man
- 1982: Patrick Cowley – Mind Warp
- 1984: Kim Wilde – Teases & Dares
- 1985: Lime – Unexpected Lovers
- 1988: Dead or Alive – Nude
- 1991: Bananarama – Pop Life
- 1995: Traci Lords – 1000 Fires
- 2004: Bobby Orlando – I Love Bobby "O" (Volume 1)
- 2007: Róisín Murphy – Overpowered
- 2009: Bananarama – Viva
- 2013: Patrick Cowley – School Daze
- 2013: Sally Shapiro – "Somewhere Else"

== Artists ==
- Abigail
- A Touch of Class
- Baccara
- Bananarama
- Claudja Barry
- Biddu
- Boys Town Gang
- Bronski Beat
- Miquel Brown
- Cappella
- The Communards
- Al Corley
- Patrick Cowley
- Dead or Alive
- Hazell Dean
- Divine
- Jason Donovan
- Erasure
- Fancy
- The Flirts
- Frankie Goes to Hollywood
- Nicki French
- Fun Fun
- Ian Levine
- Lime
- Man 2 Man
- Kelly Marie
- Giorgio Moroder
- Alison Moyet
- Bobby Orlando
- Paul Parker
- Roisin Murphy
- Man Parrish
- Pet Shop Boys
- Real McCoy
- RuPaul
- Sinitta
- Jimmy Somerville
- Stacey Q
- Stock Aitken Waterman
- Donna Summer
- Suzy Q
- Sylvester
- Take That
- Evelyn Thomas
- Jeanie Tracy
- Trans-X
- Jessie Ware
- Fiachra Trench
- U.S.U.R.A.
- Village People
- The Weather Girls
- Kim Wilde
- Viola Wills
- Tom Wilson
