= All I Need (Sylvester album) =

Studio album by Sylvester
- Released: 1982
- Studio: Independent Sound, San Francisco; Starlight Studio, Richmond, California
- Genre: Dance, post-disco, hi-NRG
- Label: Megatone
- Producer: James Wirrick

Sylvester chronology
Too Hot to Sleep (1981)	All I Need (1982)	Call Me (1983)

Professional ratings
Review scores
Source	Rating
AllMusic	3/5 stars

All I Need, later reissued as Do Ya Wanna Funk is the sixth studio album by the American recording artist Sylvester and first released on Megatone Records. The album was praised by the LGBT community media as a return to form, recalling the energy of "You Make Me Feel (Mighty Real)" released four years earlier. The San Francisco Sentinel wrote that the album was "pure pop geared directly for the I-Beam crowd that wants to boogie down for seven cuts." The Bay Area Reporter said the album was "masterful", gushing "Syl doesn't just present music, he is music at its dynamic best." Mainstream music magazine Billboard noted that the album was "his most consistent [and] interesting" since the late 1970s. In a retrospective review, AllMusic assessed the album poorly, writing that Sylvester "was now floundering, with his high-energy brand of disco out of fashion." In 2022, Rolling Stone ranked "Do Ya Wanna Funk" number 179 in their list of 200 Greatest Dance Songs of All Time.

Physical copies of the single "Do Ya Wanna Funk" listed the song's artist variously as Patrick Cowley, Patrick Cowley featuring Sylvester, or simply Sylvester. The song peaked at number 4 on the Billboard Dance Club Play chart. It was also a top 10 hit in a few European markets and a top 40 hit in the UK. "Don't Stop" (with "All I Need" for some releases) also received significant US Club Play and peaked at number 3 on the Billboard Dance Club Play chart, where "Tell Me" also charted.

A massive album release party was held in December 1982 at the former Dreamland nightclub in San Francisco, with Steve Fabus serving as deejay for the packed dance floor.

== Track listing ==
All tracks are written by James Wirrick, except where noted.

Side one
No.	Title	Writer(s)	Length
1.	"All I Need"	James Wirrick, Jeff Mehl	4:27
2.	"Be with You"		6:38
3.	"Do Ya Wanna Funk"	Patrick Cowley, Sylvester	3:31
4.	"Hard Up"	James Wirrick, Jeff Mehl	4:39

Side two
No.	Title	Writer(s)	Length
5.	"Don't Stop"	James Wirrick, Jeff Mehl	6:51
6.	"Tell Me"		4:49
7.	"Won't You Let Me Love You"		6:46

== Personnel ==
- Sylvester – lead vocals and backing vocals
- Patrick Cowley – synthesizers and sequencer
- James Wirrick – synthesizers and drum machine
- David Frazier – percussion
- The Fabulashes – backing vocals
- Wally Winzor – drums on "Tell Me" and "Won't You Let Me Love You"

== Charts ==
Chart performance for All I Need
Chart (1982)	Peak position
Australian Albums (Kent Music Report)	98
US Billboard 200	168
US R&B Albums	34
