= Call Me (Sylvester album) =

Studio album by Sylvester
- Released: 1983
- Genre: Post-disco, Hi-NRG
- Label: Megatone
- Producer: James "Tip" Wirrick

Sylvester chronology
All I Need (1982)	Call Me (1983)	M-1015 (1984)

Professional ratings
Review scores
Source	Rating
Allmusic	2/5 stars

Call Me is the seventh studio album by the American recording artist Sylvester.

== Track listing ==
Side one
No.	Title	Writer(s)	Length
1.	"Trouble in Paradise"	James Wirrick, Jeff Mehl, Sylvester	6:33
2.	"Call Me"	Wirrick, Mehl	4:22
3.	"Good Feelin'"	Dennis Wadlington, Dennis Sweet, Sylvester	4:15
4.	"He'll Understand"	Lucy E. Campbell, John T. Benson, Jr.	1:15

Side two
No.	Title	Writer(s)	Length
5.	"One Night Only"	Tom Eyen, Henry Krieger	4:12
6.	"Too Late"	Wirrick, Mehl	3:43
7.	"Power of Love"	Wirrick, Mehl	5:25
8.	"Band of Gold"	Ron Dunbar, Edythe Wayne	3:47

CD bonus tracks (1992)
No.	Title	Writer(s)	Length
9.	"Trouble in Paradise" (Remix)	Wirrick, Mehl, Sylvester	7:55
10.	"Call Me" (Remix)	Wirrick, Mehl	6:21
11.	"Good Feelin'" (Remix)	Wadlington, Sweet, Sylvester	6:24
12.	"Too Late" (Remix)	Wirrick, Mehl	5:14
13.	"Band of Gold" (Remix)	Dunbar, Wayne	7:22

== Singles ==
Year	Title	Chart positions		
Year	Title	US Dance	US R&B	UK
1983	"Band of Gold"	18	—	67
1983	"Too Late"	16	68	—
1983	"One Night Only"	—	—	—
1983	"Trouble in Paradise"	—	—	—
1984	"Good Feelin'"	57	—	—
1984	"Call Me"	—	—	—
