= Mind Warp =

Studio album by Patrick Cowley
- Released: 1982
- Recorded: Recorded and mixed at The Automatt, Additional recording at Tres Virgos Studios, San Rafael in 1981
- Genre: Hi-NRG; disco; dance-pop; synth-pop; post-punk
- Length: 41:15
- Label: Megatone
- Producer: Patrick Cowley

Patrick Cowley chronology
Megatron Man (1981)	Mind Warp (1982)	Catholic (2009)

Mind Warp was Patrick Cowley's third and final studio album. Composed in 1982, it is in the uptempo Hi-NRG dance music style.

== Track listing ==
All tracks written and composed by Patrick Cowley

1. "Tech-No-Logical World" - 7:43
2. "Invasion" - 6:44
3. "They Came at Night" - 6:12
4. "Mind Warp" - 6:36
5. "Primitive World" - 3:01
6. "Mutant Man" - 5:23
7. "Goin' Home" - 5:36
8. "Invasion" (Remix) - 6:21
9. "Mind Warp" (Remix) - 7:57
10. "Goin' Home" (Remix) - 8:37
11. "Tech-No-Logical World" (Instrumental) - 7:28
12. "Tech-No-Logical World" (Radio Edit) - 3:36
- Tracks 8–12 are CD bonus tracks

== Personnel ==
- Patrick Cowley - all instruments, arrangements
- Jo-Carol Block, Lauren Carter, Paul Parker - vocals
- Erica Buffett, J. Forrest Knight, Jeff Mehl, Jim Saunders, Jo-Carol Block, John Hedges, Lauren Carter, Mary Buffett, Michael Bailey, Nicole Buffett, Peter Buffett, Stacey Sudduth - vocal chants ("Primitive World")
- James "Tip" Wirrick - guitar
- David Frazier - additional percussion

Technical

- Marty Blecman - Associate Producer
- Leslie Ann Jones, Maureen Droney - Engineering
- Gordon Lyon - Second Engineer
- Ken Kessie - Mixing
- Robert L. Missbach - Recording
- José Rodriguez - Mastering
- Jim Saunders - Cover, Label, Sleeve
- David Wellers - Lithography
- Leland Dale Saunders - Moon Photos
