= Can't Take My Eyes Off You =

1967 single by Frankie Valli

- Cover of the 1967 US single

Single by Frankie Valli

from the album Frankie Valli: Solo
- B-side: "The Trouble with Me"
- Released: April 1967
- Recorded: April 1967
- Studio: A & R (New York City)
- Genre: Soul; pop; pop-soul
- Length: 3:24
- Label: Philips
- Songwriters: Bob Crewe; Bob Gaudio
- Producer: Bob Crewe

Frankie Valli singles chronology
"The Proud One" (1966)	"Can't Take My Eyes Off You" (1967)	"I Make a Fool of Myself" (1967)

"Can't Take My Eyes Off You" is a 1967 song written by Bob Crewe and Bob Gaudio, and first recorded and released as a single by Gaudio's Four Seasons bandmate Frankie Valli. The song was among his biggest hits, earning a gold record and reaching No. 2 on the Billboard Hot 100 for a week, making it Valli's biggest solo hit until he hit No. 1 in 1975 with "My Eyes Adored You". "Can't Take My Eyes Off You" has been recorded in many other arrangements, many of which have charted in different countries.

== Background ==
Gaudio describes the song as "the one that almost got away" until Windsor, Ontario, radio station CKLW (a station also serving the Detroit metro on the American side of the border) intervened. In 1967, the record's producers urged Paul Drew, program director at the station, to consider the tune for rotation. For much of the 1960s and 1970s, CKLW was credited with launching hit records via its powerful signal, blanketing the Great Lakes region; in addition to CKLW, Drew also held a role as the national program director for the entire RKO General's contemporary hit radio chain, putting him in a particularly strong position to break new records to a national audience. Drew did not warm to the song at first, but accepted an invitation to hear it live at the Roostertail, where Valli was performing a weeklong stint with the Four Seasons. Drew liked what he heard and added the song to his station's playlist. "The switchboards lit up, and the rest, as they say, is history", Gaudio recalled.

Valli recalled in 2014 that "Can't Take My Eyes Off You" was the first step in the fulfillment of his goal to sing music that did not require him to use falsetto: "I didn't want to sing like that my whole life. Once we established the sound, the plan was that eventually I would do solo [records] and some things I really wanted to do. I was very lucky to make the transition to 'My Eyes Adored You' and 'Swearin' to God', which had none of that." Valli also recalled that the record had been mothballed by The Four Seasons' record company for a year because of their fear that The Four Seasons (who had already lost Nick Massi in 1965) were breaking up, to which Valli insisted that he had no intentions of ever leaving The Four Seasons.

== Credits ==
The song was written by Bob Crewe and Bob Gaudio. Melodic elements bear a similarity to passages from the "Adagio of Spartacus and Phrygia" section of the 1956 ballet Spartacus (Suite No. 2) by Aram Khachaturian. At rehearsal marking "2", the harmony (by measure) is in D flat, then D flat major seven, then D flat dominant seven, then G flat six.

The original recording, from an arrangement by Gaudio and Artie Schroeck, was made at A & R Studio 2 (formerly Columbia Studio A), at 799 7th Avenue in New York City, with Crewe producing and Phil Ramone engineering. At the first verse, the harmony (by measure) is in E, then E major seven, then E dominant seven, then A.

== Reception ==
Billboard described the single as "strong rhythm ballad material from the pen of Bob Crewe and Bob Gaudio with an exceptional Valli vocal combined with an exciting Artie Schroeck arrangement." Cash Box called the single a "smooth, gentle, softly spoken romancer".

== Charts ==
=== Weekly charts ===
Chart (1967–68)	Peak position
Australia (Go-Set)	15
Canada RPM Top Singles	2
US Billboard Hot 100	2
US Cash Box Top 100	1

=== Year-end charts ===
Chart (1967)	Rank
Canada	18
US Billboard Hot 100	10
US Cash Box Top 100	3

== Certifications ==
Region	Certification	Certified units/sales
New Zealand (RMNZ)	2× Platinum	60,000^{‡}
Spain (Promusicae)	Gold	30,000^{‡}
United Kingdom (BPI)	Silver	200,000^{‡}
United States (RIAA)	Gold	1,000,000^{^}
^{^} Shipments figures based on certification alone.^{‡} Sales+streaming figures based on certification alone.

== Boys Town Gang version ==
"Can't Take My Eyes Off You"

Single by Boys Town Gang

from the album Disc Charge
- Released: July 29, 1982
- Genre: Disco
- Length: 3:28 (7" version); 9:47 (album version)
- Label: Moby Dick
- Songwriters: Bob Crewe, Bob Gaudio
- Producer: Bill Motley

Boys Town Gang singles chronology
"Signed, Sealed, Delivered I'm Yours" (1982)	"Can't Take My Eyes Off You" (1982)	"Brand New Me" (1984)

In 1982, San Francisco-based post-disco band Boys Town Gang released a dance version of the song which reached the top spot in the Netherlands, Belgium, Mexico, and Spain and number four on the United Kingdom singles chart. This version was also successful in Japan, receiving a gold digital certification by the Recording Industry Association of Japan (RIAJ) in 2011. The song is a playable track in the 2012 video game Just Dance 4.

=== Track listings ===
7-inch single

1. "Can't Take My Eyes Off You" – 3:28
2. "Can't Take My Eyes Off You" (reprise) – 4:42

7-inch single

1. "Can't Take My Eyes Off You" – 3:40
2. "Disco Kicks" – 4:04

=== Charts ===
==== Weekly charts ====
Chart (1982–1983)	Peak position
Australia (Kent Music Report)	21
Belgium (Ultratop 50 Flanders)	1
Ireland (IRMA)	5
Mexico (Notitas Musicales Hit Parade)	1
Netherlands (Dutch Top 40)	1
Netherlands (Single Top 100)	1
UK Singles (OCC)	4
West Germany (Official German Charts)	43

==== Year-end charts ====
Chart (1983)	Position
Australia (Kent Music Report)	71

== Lauryn Hill version ==
"Can't Take My Eyes Off of You"

Song by Lauryn Hill

from the album The Miseducation of Lauryn Hill
- Released: August 25, 1998
- Recorded: 1997
- Genre: Soul; R&B
- Length: 3:41
- Label: Ruffhouse; Columbia
- Songwriters: Robert Crewe; Robert Gaudio
- Producer: Lauryn Hill

Lauryn Hill's version of the song was recorded in 1997, while she was eight months pregnant with her first child. It was first featured in the movie Conspiracy Theory (1997), as was the Frankie Valli version. While the song was not featured on the soundtrack, a radio jockey at KMEL in San Francisco put the song on a CD and began playing it; more radio stations followed suit, causing a domino effect around the U.S., ultimately leading the song to peak at number two on the Rhythmic Top 40 chart, despite Hill's label not releasing the song as a single. Due to the popularity of the song it was added as a hidden track on The Miseducation of Lauryn Hill.

This version was also nominated for a Grammy Award for Best Female Pop Vocal Performance at the 41st Grammy Awards in 1999, becoming the first hidden track to ever receive a Grammy nomination. Consequence of Sound named it the best hidden track of all time. In 2014, VH1 also named it the best hidden track of all time. Academy Award–winning actor Forest Whitaker was inspired to name his daughter True, after hearing Hill's version of the song.

=== Charts ===
Chart (1998–1999)	Peak position
Australia (ARIA)	8
US Rhythmic (Billboard)	2
US Hot 100 Airplay	35

=== Certifications ===
Region	Certification	Certified units/sales
New Zealand (RMNZ)	2× Platinum	60,000^{‡}
United Kingdom (BPI)	Silver	200,000^{‡}
^{‡} Sales+streaming figures based on certification alone.

== Other cover versions ==
The song has been recorded by many artists. Among the most notable examples are the following:

- In late 1967, the Lettermen recorded the "Can't Take My Eyes Off You" as a medley with "Goin' Out of My Head", which was featured on their album The Lettermen!! ...And Live! that same year. Their rendition reached number 7 on the U.S. Billboard Hot 100 and number 2 Easy Listening.
- In 1968, Andy Williams' version from his 1967 album Love, Andy made it to number 5 on the UK singles chart and number 8 on the Irish Singles Chart. The arranger and producer was Nick DeCaro and the conductor was Eddie Karam. In 2002, he recorded a new version of the song for his compilation album The Essential Andy Williams, as a duet with British actress and singer Denise van Outen, which reached number 23 in the UK singles charts.
- Maureen McGovern released her cover for her self-titled album as a single in 1979 (number 27 on the US Adult Contemporary chart in 1979; number 5 Canadian AC in 1980).
- In 1991, the Pet Shop Boys recorded "Where the Streets Have No Name (I Can't Take My Eyes Off You)", a medley of the song with U2's "Where the Streets Have No Name", which reached number 4 in the U.K. and number 72 in the U.S. and was featured on their compilation album Discography: The Complete Singles Collection.
- In 1992, Dutch singers Gerard Joling and Tatjana Šimić recorded a duet version of the song (including a rap segment by Darrell Bell) for Joling's album Eye to Eye. The single peaked at number 5 in the Dutch Top 40 charts.
- In 1993, Morten Harket recorded a cover of the song, produced by Stephen Hague, for the ending of the film Coneheads.
- In the 1999 film 10 Things I Hate About You, Patrick Verona (played by Heath Ledger), with backing from the school marching band, serenades Kat (played by Julia Stiles) with a cover of the song, a scene that earned Ledger a nomination for MTV Movie Award for Best Musical Performance.
- In 2010, fans of the German football club 1. FC Union Berlin started using the melody for a chant for their player Torsten Mattuschka, inspired by Manchester United F.C. fans who used it for their player Owen Hargreaves.
- In 2011, Stereophonics frontman Kelly Jones sang an acoustic version of the song in tribute to former Wales national football team manager Gary Speed. The song was adopted as an anthem for Welsh football fans during Speed's playing career with Wales after being used in a BBC Wales promo for the 1994 World Cup qualifying campaign.
- In 2019, Surf Mesa released a tropical house cover of the song called "ILY (I Love You Baby)", featuring vocals by Emilee Flood for the EP Another Life. Upon being re-released in 2020, it became a top 40 hit in many countries, including the United States and the United Kingdom. Unlike other cover versions, this cover is based solely around the chorus of the original Frankie Valli recording, and was renamed to reflect that.
- In 2026, Galantis released a cover of the song.
