= Suzy Q (group) =

Suzy-Q
- Also known as: Suzy Q
- Origin: Montréal, Canada
- Genres: Post-disco, Hi-NRG
- Years active: 1981–1989
- Labels: J.C. Records (Canada); Atlantic (US)

Suzy Q was a Canadian studio project created by Jerry Cucuzzella. Female vocalists include Michelle Mills, Angie Vileno and Carol Jiani. The group is best known for their song "Get on Up and Do It Again" which entered two Billboard charts.

== Career ==
Originally, "Get on Up and Do It Again" was recorded in 1981 with Carol Jiani as the vocalist and reached number 4 on the Billboard Club chart the end of June of the same year. The single also reached number 64 on the R&B chart. In December 1981, with Michelle Mills as vocalist, "With Your Love"/"Tonight" peaked at number 12 on the Billboard Club chart.

In 1985, Suzy Q covered a song "Harmony" which was written by Geoff Bastow and Giorgio Moroder.

In 1986, Suzy Q recorded an Italo-disco/Hi-NRG song and club hit called "Can't Live Without Your Love", peaking at number 19 on the Billboard Club chart, which was written by Giovanni D'Orazio and Antonio Bentivegna with Angie Vileno as vocalist.

Between years 1987 and 1989, Suzy Q recorded a couple of Eurobeat/hi-NRG songs for J.C. Records, then the group split up.

== Discography ==
=== Studio albums ===
Year	Album	US	CA
1981	Get On Up And Do It Again	—	—
1982	Don't You Stop That Feeling	—	—
"—" denotes an album that did not chart or was not released in that region.

=== Singles ===
Year	Song	U.S.	U.S. R&B	U.S. Dance	U.S. Dance Sales
1981	"Get on Up Do It Again"	—	64	4	—
1982	"Get on Up"	—	—	12	—
1982	"I Can't Give You More"	—	—	—	—
1982	"Come Let's Have A Party "	—	—	—	—
1982	"Tonight" (Remix)	—	—	—	—
1983	"Don't You Stop The Feeling"	—	—	—	—
1985	"Harmony"	—	—	—	—
1985	"Computer Music"	—	—	—	—
1986	"Can't Live Without Your Love"	—	—	10	19
1987	"Don't Come Crying To Me"	—	—	—	—
1989	"Fun Fun"	—	—	—	—
1989	"Shake, Shake, Shake"	—	—	—	—
"—" denotes a single that did not chart or was not released in that region.
