= Right on Target =

Single by Paul Parker

from the album Too Much To Dream
- Released: 1982
- Genre: Hi-NRG
- Length: 6:20 (maxi single version), 3:47 (album version)
- Label: Megatone Records
- Songwriter(s): Patrick Cowley
- Producer(s): Patrick Cowley

Paul Parker singles chronology
"Right on Target"	"Shot In the Night"

"Right on Target" is a 1982 single by Paul Parker. It was released on Megatone Records.

== Background ==
The song was produced and written by Patrick Cowley in the Hi-NRG style. It was the lead single from Parker's debut album Too Much To Dream. "Right on Target" was his first and most successful dance chart entry. The track hit number one for two weeks. It was the first of two singles to make it to the top spot.
