= List of number-one songs of 1982 (Mexico) =

This is a list of the songs that reached number one in Mexico in 1982, according to the Notitas Musicales magazine with data provided by Radio Mil(which also provided charts for Billboard's "Hits of the World" between 1969 and 1981).

Notitas Musicales was a bi-weekly magazine that published two record charts:

- "Canciones que México canta" ("Songs that Mexico sings"), which listed the Top 10 most popular Spanish-language songs in Mexico, and
- "Hit Parade", which was a Top 10 of the most popular songs in Mexico that were in languages other than Spanish.

== Chart history ==
Issue Date	Spanish-language songs		Songs in other languages		Ref.
Issue Date	Song	Artist(s)	Song	Artist(s)	Ref.
1 January	"Amor, no me ignores"	Camilo Sesto	"New York, New York"	Frank Sinatra	
15 January	"Él me mintió"	Amanda Miguel	"New York, New York"	Frank Sinatra	
1 February	"Mi buen corazón"	Amanda Miguel	"Queen of Hearts"	Juice Newton	
15 February	"Mi buen corazón"	Amanda Miguel	"Haut les mains"	Ottawan	
1 March	"Mi buen corazón"	Amanda Miguel	"Haut les mains"	Ottawan	
15 March	"Él me mintió"	Amanda Miguel	"Haut les mains"	Ottawan	
1 April	"1+1=2 enamorados"	Luis Miguel	"Haut les mains"	Ottawan	
15 April	"1+1=2 enamorados"	Luis Miguel	"Physical"	Olivia Newton-John	
1 May	"1+1=2 enamorados"	Luis Miguel	"Designer Music"	Lipps Inc.	
15 May	"1+1=2 enamorados"	Luis Miguel	"Chariots of Fire"	Vangelis	
1 June	"1+1=2 enamorados"	Luis Miguel	"Arthur's Theme"	Christopher Cross	
15 June	"1+1=2 enamorados"	Luis Miguel	"Super Freak"	Rick James	
1 July	"1+1=2 enamorados"	Luis Miguel	"We Kill The World"	Boney M.	
15 July	"La maldita primavera"	Yuri	"We Kill The World"	Boney M.	
1 August	"La maldita primavera"	Yuri	"We Kill The World"	Boney M.	
15 August	"La maldita primavera"	Yuri	"We Kill The World"	Boney M.	
1 September	"La maldita primavera"	Yuri	"We Kill The World"	Boney M.	
15 September	"La maldita primavera"	Yuri	"Disco Deewane"	Nazia Hassan	
1 October	"La maldita primavera"	Yuri	"Da Da Da"	Trio	
15 October	"La maldita primavera"	Yuri	"Can't Take My Eyes Off You"	Boys Town Gang	
1 November	"Insensible"	Juan Gabriel	"Can't Take My Eyes Off You"	Boys Town Gang	
15 November	"Quiero rock"	Menudo	"Fandango"	Herb Alpert	
1 December	"Directo al corazón"	Luis Miguel	"Fandango"	Herb Alpert	
15 December	"Directo al corazón"	Luis Miguel	"Can't Take My Eyes Off You"	Boys Town Gang	

== See also ==
- 1982 in music

== Sources ==
- Print editions of the Notitas Musicales magazine.
