= Frank Loverde =

American singer

- Also known as: Loverde
- Born: November 30, 1947
- Origin: Los Angeles, California
- Died: December 20, 1990 (aged 43) San Francisco, California, US
- Genres: Electronic, Hi-NRG, experimental music
- Instruments: Vocals, guitar
- Years active: 1980–1988
- Labels: Prism Records (1980), Megatone (1981–1987)

Frank Loverde (or simply Loverde; 1947–1990) was an American disco and Hi-NRG singer and musician active during the 1980s. Based in San Francisco, Loverde worked with record producer Patrick Cowley on his greatest success; "Die Hard Lover", released in 1982.

== Early life ==
Loverde was born in Los Angeles, California in 1947. Frank had two brothers and two sisters. He was from a big Italian family. Born to Frances and Septemo Loverde. He was very close to his family, where music filled the rooms. In 1964, he appeared as a guest on American Bandstand in which he and 3 other panelists reviewed the Beatles single "A Hard Day's Night", and b-side, "I Should Have Known Better". But some time during the early 1970s he relocated to New York City to take a job as a DJ at the Yellow Fingers nightclub. Loverde continued working at this venue for four years, during this time becoming more interested in music production and playing the guitar. During the 1970s, Frank met Linda Imperial in St. Louis, Missouri, while working as a guest DJ at a newly opened night club. In the late 1970s, Loverde re-located to San Francisco with partner Dan Straehorn (a dance choreographer).

== Musical career ==
Working with Linda Imperial and her sister, Loverde made a name for himself on the San Francisco club scene as both a DJ and performer. During this time, the trio gained a record deal with Prism Records and released "Iko Iko", a record produced by Patrick Cowley and Michael Finden, in 1980. Loverde continued on the club circuit, occasionally working on studio projects, until 1982 when he was given an instrumental track by Cowley and asked to write lyrics for it. This track became "Die Hard Lover", which was recorded along with Imperial and Peggy Gibbons. The trio, now calling themselves Loverde, had huge success with the single in 1982 and became celebrities in the Hi-NRG music community.

Loverde's second single was "My World Is Empty Without You", another successful release which led to television appearances and a tour. By the time of the single's release, Cowley was becoming increasingly ill, suffering from AIDS, and was unable to contribute anything more than simple synthesizer riffs. Production credits on the single went to Bill Motley and Horus Jack Tolson. Following Cowley's death in 1982, Loverde was unable to repeat its earlier success with new music produced without Cowley's input. They recorded Backstreet Romance in 1983, but the record was a commercial failure. Loverde's last works were "Love Takes Me Higher" and "Manifestation of Love", both released in 1987. After the collapse of Megatone Records in 1988, Loverde was unable to find a new contract.

== Death ==
Sometime in the late 1980s, Frank Loverde contracted the AIDS virus. The illness had obliterated the music industry in San Francisco and many of Loverde's acquaintances had already died from the virus. He died just before Christmas on December 20, 1990, at the age of 43, surrounded by his family.
