= Do Ya Wanna Funk =

1982 dance song by Sylvester and Patrick Cowley

Single by Sylvester and Patrick Cowley

from the album All I Need
- Released: 1982
- Genre: Hi-NRG; disco
- Length: 3:29 (radio version)
- Label: Megatone (US); London (UK)
- Songwriters: Patrick Cowley; Sylvester James
- Producer: Patrick Cowley

Sylvester and Patrick Cowley singles chronology
"Magic Number" (1981)	"Do Ya Wanna Funk" (1982)	"Don't Stop" (1982)

"Do Ya Wanna Funk" is a 1982 dance song recorded by American recording artists Sylvester and Patrick Cowley. It was produced by Cowley, who died the same year. The song was mostly successful in Europe, especially in Belgium, Finland and Norway, where it became a top-10 hit. It reached the top 20 in the Netherlands and Switzerland, and made it to the top 30 in West Germany and Australia, and the top 40 in the United Kingdom.

The song was inspired by "I'm Your Jeanie", a single by Jeanie Tracy, who was a background vocalist for Sylvester. It was featured in the film Trading Places (1983) and Argylle (2024).

== Legacy ==
In 2020, Slant Magazine ranked "Do Ya Wanna Funk" number 38 in their list of "The 100 Best Dance Songs of All Time". In 2022, Rolling Stone ranked the song number 179 in their "200 Greatest Dance Songs of All Time" list. In 2025, Billboard magazine ranked it number 85 in their list of "The 100 Best Dance Songs of All Time".

== Track listing ==
- 12", US'
1. "Do Ya Wanna Funk" – 6:47
2. "Do Ya Wanna Funk" (instrumental) – 6:47
3. "Do Ya Wanna Funk" (radio version) – 3:29
- 12", UK
1. "Do Ya Wanna Funk" – 6:47
2. "Do Ya Wanna Funk" (instrumental) – 6:47
3. "Do Ya Wanna Funk" (radio version) – 3:29
- 12", Lebanon
1. "Do Ya Wanna Funk" – 5:30

== Personnel ==
- Sylvester – voices
- Patrick Cowley – synthesizers, drum machine and sequencer

== Charts ==
Chart (1982–83)	Peak position
Australia (Kent Music Report)	24
Belgium (Ultratop Flanders)	5
Finland (Suomen virallinen lista)	5
France (SNEP)	40
Netherlands (Dutch Top 40)	14
Netherlands (Single Top 100)	17
Norway (VG-lista)	8
Switzerland (Schweizer Hitparade)	12
UK Singles (Official Charts)	32
US Dance Music/Club Play Singles (Billboard)	4
West Germany (GfK)	30

== Appearances in film and television ==
- The song is heard throughout a party scene in the Eddie Murphy comedy Trading Places (1983).
- The song appears in the 1989 AIDS drama Longtime Companion, and the 2001 TV miniseries Further Tales of the City. In both cases its use is an anachronism, being heard in scenes set a year before the song was even released.
- The song featured in the 1984 Oscar-winning documentary The Times of Harvey Milk.
- The song is covered by Sandra Bernhard in the 1990 film version of her stage show, Without You I'm Nothing.
- It is used on multiple occasions in the 2024 movie Argylle.
- It featured in the 2021 Channel 4 TV series It's a Sin during a club scene whilst Ritchie explains the various theories around the origins of HIV.
- The song appeared in the "lip sync for the crown" segment of the season 8 finale of RuPaul's Drag Race: All Stars where contestants and finalists Jimbo and Kandy Muse performed it to impress RuPaul and ultimately win the competition.
