= Cruisin' the Streets =

Single by Boys Town Gang

from the album Cruisin' the Streets
- Released: 1981
- Recorded: 1980
- Genre: Disco
- Label: Moby Dick Records
- Songwriter(s): Bill Motley
- Producer(s): Bill Motley

"Cruisin' the Streets" is a disco song released in 1981 by the Boys Town Gang. While disco was a popular genre in gay communities at the time, this song is notable for containing explicit reference to gay sexuality and gay life.

== Song plot ==
The extended version of the song includes a lengthy dialogue taking place at night in what is clearly implied to be Folsom Street in San Francisco. The dialogue consists of gay men cruising each other, discussing their sexual encounters and conversing with a female prostitute. At one point, a police car stops and three policemen step out and confront two men who are engaging in sexual activity as a female prostitute looks on. One of the officers asks the others what should be done, and the third officer states that he knows "just what to do to 'em" and from the subsequent noises it is implied that the officers are having sex with the prostitute and anal sex with the two men.

== Track listing ==
"Cruisin' the Streets"
No.	Title	Writer(s)	Sections	Length
1.	"Remember Me" / "Ain't No Mountain High Enough Suite"	Ashford and Simpson	Overture / Remember Me / Ain't No Mountain High Enough / Reprise / Finale	14:00
2.	"Cruisin' the Streets"	Bill Motley	Cruisin' / Rejected / The Pick-Up / Busted / Reprise	13:09
