= Johnny and Mary =

1980 single by Robert Palmer

Single by Robert Palmer

from the album Clues
- B-side: "What's It Take" (EU); "Style Kills" (NA)
- Released: August 1980
- Studio: Compass Point Studios
- Genre: New wave; synth-pop; electropop
- Length: 3:59
- Label: Island
- Songwriter: Robert Palmer

Robert Palmer singles chronology
"What's It Take" (1979)	"Johnny and Mary" (1980)	"Looking for Clues" (1980)

Music video
- "Johnny and Mary" on YouTube

"Johnny and Mary" is a song written and originally performed by English musician Robert Palmer. Palmer's version was recorded in 1980 at Compass Point Studios, New Providence, in the Bahamas. The song was featured on Palmer's album Clues (1980).

"Johnny and Mary" went to No. 44 on the UK Singles Chart, and was a top 40 hit in Canada, Australia, New Zealand, South Africa and several European countries. In Germany, it peaked at No. 7 on the singles chart and spent a total of 23 weeks in the top 20. In Spain, it peaked at No. 1 on the Spanish singles chart (AFYVE).

Though the single did not chart in the US Hot 100, it did reach No. 18 on Billboard's Club Play Singles chart.

The hook from "Johnny and Mary" was used as the signature tune in advertisements promoting Renault cars throughout the 1980s and 1990s. Early adverts used Palmer's original version, while a range of special recordings in different styles were produced during the 1990s, most famously an acoustic interpretation by Martin Taylor, which he released on his album Spirit of Django. Taylor recorded alternate versions for Renault; the last being in 1998 for the launch of the all-new Renault Clio. In 2021, Swedish singer Hanna Hägglund recorded a new version of the song, used again by Renault in TV ads to launch its latest version of its Clio model.

== Critical reception ==
Upon its release, Mike Gardner of Record Mirror noted that Palmer had merged his own style with that of Gary Numan, "resulting in a mixture that sounds suspiciously like mid period Cliff Richard". He added that it has the "double distinction of giving the ears a treat and being a formidable appetiser for his forthcoming album". Martyn Sutton of Melody Maker also believed that the "ultra-modern, Eighties single" was "something of a departure" from Palmer as it "offers less blue eyed soul than usual and a lot more cold eyes, electronic wheeling and dealing". He concluded that it "deserves to be a hit".

Paul Rambali of NME was less positive in his review, writing that "what seems like a sad little story of connubial confusion" is "made more commonplace than it might otherwise be through injudicious use of electronic textures". He also felt that a "decent middle eight would have helped too". In contrast, Danny Baker, writing a new review for NME, stated that "this is the best buy at 45 right now" and remarked that Rambali, "who coolly received this a fortnight ago, has a gleam in his piercing blue eye that suggests he mayn't have given this the shake it deserved at that time".

== Chart performance ==
=== Weekly charts ===
Chart (1980–1981)	Peak position
Australia (Kent Music Report)	20
Austria (Ö3 Austria Top 40)	10
Belgium (Ultratop 50 Flanders)	8
Canada Top Singles (RPM)	32
Netherlands (Dutch Top 40)	21
Netherlands (Single Top 100)	27
New Zealand (Recorded Music NZ)	12
South Africa (Springbok Radio)	5
Spain (AFYVE)	1
Sweden (Sverigetopplistan)	11
Switzerland (Schweizer Hitparade)	5
UK Singles (Official Charts)	44
US Billboard Hot Dance Club Play	18
West Germany (GfK)	7

=== Year-end charts ===
Chart (1980)	Position
Belgium (Ultratop 50 Flanders)	80

== Todd Terje featuring Bryan Ferry version ==
"Johnny and Mary"

Single by Todd Terje featuring Bryan Ferry

from the album It's Album Time and Avonmore
- Released: 7 April 2014
- Genre: Electronica
- Length: 6:32 (album version); 5:10 (radio edit)
- Label: Olsen
- Songwriter: Robert Palmer
- Producer: Todd Terje

Todd Terje singles chronology
"Leisure Suit Preben" (2013)	"Johnny and Mary" (2014)	"Alfonso Muskedunder" (2015)

Bryan Ferry singles chronology
"Alphaville" (2011)	"Johnny and Mary" (2014)	"Loop De Li" (2014)

Norwegian DJ Todd Terje covered "Johnny and Mary" for his debut studio album It's Album Time. His version features vocals from English musician Bryan Ferry. Terje's version was released as a single on 7 April 2014 as a digital download and peaked at number 185 on the French Singles Chart. It also appears on Ferry's fourteenth studio album, Avonmore.

=== Track listing ===
CD single
No.	Title	Length
1.	"Johnny and Mary"	6:32
2.	"Johnny and Mary" (Radio edit)	5:10

Digital download
No.	Title	Length
1.	"Johnny and Mary" (Radio edit)	5:10

=== Charts ===
Chart (2014)	Peak position
France (SNEP)	185

== Other notable versions ==
- In 1989, model Leigh Jaeger released a version of the song as a single through A&M Records. Jaeger previously appeared as one of the models in the music videos for Palmer's "I Didn't Mean to Turn You On" and "Simply Irresistible". Jaeger's version was produced by Stephen Stewart-Short and the 12-inch format included a remix by Phil Harding and Ian Curnow. The music video features vogue dancing and was the earliest to showcase the dance in the UK.

== See also ==
- List of number-one singles of 1981 (Spain)
