= Inspector Norse =

2012 single by Todd Terje

Single by Todd Terje

from the album It's the Arps and It's Album Time
- Released: 19 June 2012
- Recorded: 2011
- Genre: Nu-disco; space disco; electro house
- Length: 6:40 (single); 6:59 (album version); 3:47 (radio edit)
- Label: Smalltown Supersound; Olsen
- Songwriter: Terje Olsen
- Producer: Todd Terje

Todd Terje singles chronology
"Inspector Norse" (2012)	"Lanzarote" (2013)

Music video
- "Inspector Norse" on YouTube

"Inspector Norse" is the debut single by Norwegian DJ and music producer Todd Terje, released on 19 June 2012 from his fourth extended play It's the Arps. The song was later featured as the twelfth and final track on his debut studio album It's Album Time. The official music video for the song was uploaded on 19 June 2012 to Pitchfork's YouTube channel. The song was named Mixmag's top tune of 2012 and Resident Advisor's second-best track of 2012. The track (and the EP featuring it) was recorded using only the ARP 2600 synthesizer.

== Music video ==
The official music video for the song, lasting four minutes and twenty seconds, was uploaded on 19 June 2012 to the official Pitchfork YouTube channel. The video, which is an excerpt from the short film Whateverest, is centered on a Norwegian man named Marius Solem Johansen, known by his internet alias "Inspector Norse", and his passion for music, drugs and dancing.

== Track listing ==
CD-R release
No.	Title	Length
1.	"Inspector Norse" (Radio Edit)	3:47
2.	"Inspector Norse" (Album Version)	6:59

== Charts ==
Chart (2012)	Peak position
Belgium (Ultratip Bubbling Under Flanders)	9
Belgium Dance (Ultratop Flanders)	10
Netherlands (Single Top 100)	88

== Release history ==
Region	Date	Label	Format	Catalogue no.
Worldwide	19 June 2012	Smalltown Supersound	Digital download	—
United Kingdom	2014	Olsen	CD-R	OLS008P

== Remixes ==
The track has been remixed by Justin Van Der Volgen and Pépé Bradock. Both of their remixes were released in 2015.
