= Get on Up and Do It Again =

Single by Suzy Q

from the album Get On Up and Do It Again
- Released: 1981, 1982
- Length: 6:09 (Album version); 5:45 (1982 version)
- Label: Atlantic
- Songwriter(s): Jerry Cucuzzella, Giovanni D'Orazio, Sergio Panzera

Suzy Q singles chronology
"Get on Up and Do It Again" (1981)	"Get on Up" (1982)

"Get on Up and Do It Again" is a song by Canadian studio project Suzy Q. The song was written by Jerry Cucuzzella, Giovanni D'Orazio, Sergio Panzera and was produced by the J.C. Records owner Jerry Cucuzzella. The song is also included on their album Get On Up And Do It Again.

The original 1981 version has peaked at number 4 on the Billboard Dance chart and the second 1982 version at 12 on the same chart.

== Composition ==
"Get On Up and Do It Again" is set in common time and has a moderate tempo of 112 beats per minute.

== Track listing ==
=== Promotional 12-inch singles ===
US single

1. "Get On Up Do It Again" (Vocal) (Long Version) – 5:54
2. "Get On Up Do It Again Pt. II" (Vocal) (Short Version)– 3:28

Canadian single

1. "Get On Up Do It Again" (Vocal) – 5:54
2. "Get On Up Do It Again" (instrumental) – 3:17

== Chart positions ==
Chart (1981)	Peak position
U.S. Billboard Hot 100	–
U.S. Billboard Hot Dance Club Play	4
U.S. Billboard Black Singles	65
Chart (1982)	Peak position
U.S. Billboard Hot Dance Club Play	12
