= Delorean Dynamite =

Single by Todd Terje

from the album It's Album Time
- B-side: "Oh Joy" (12")
- Released: 10 February 2014
- Genre: Disco; hi-NRG; electro house
- Length: 6:46 (Album version); 4:53 (Video edit)
- Label: Olsen
- Songwriter: Terje Olsen
- Producer: Todd Terje

Todd Terje singles chronology
"Strandbar" (2013)	"Delorean Dynamite" (2014)	"Leisure Suit Preben" (2014)

Music video
- "Delorean Dynamite" on YouTube

"Delorean Dynamite" is a song by Norwegian DJ Todd Terje. It was released as the third single from his debut studio album, It's Album Time, on 10 February 2014. A 12" vinyl version was released on 28 May 2014. A music video for the song was uploaded on Terje's YouTube channel. The song was featured on the soundtrack for the video game Forza Horizon 2.

== Music video ==
The official music video for "Delorean Dynamite" was released on 21 October 2014. Directed by Espen Friberg, the video is an advertisement for a used DeLorean being sold by a fellow Norwegian man named Frank.

== Track listing ==
- Olsen — OLS007

Side A
No.	Title	Length
1.	"Delorean Dynamite" (Disco Mix)
2.	"Delorean Dynamite"

Side B
No.	Title	Length
1.	"Oh Joy" (Disco Mix)
2.	"Oh Joy-lude"

== Charts ==
Chart (2014)	Peak position
Belgium (Ultratip Bubbling Under Flanders)	56
Belgium Dance (Ultratop Flanders)	50

== Release history ==
Region	Date	Label	Format	Catalogue no.
Worldwide	10 February 2014	Olsen	Digital download	—
Norway	28 May 2014	Olsen	12"	OLS 007
