= Jimmy D. Robinson =

Jimmy D Robinson
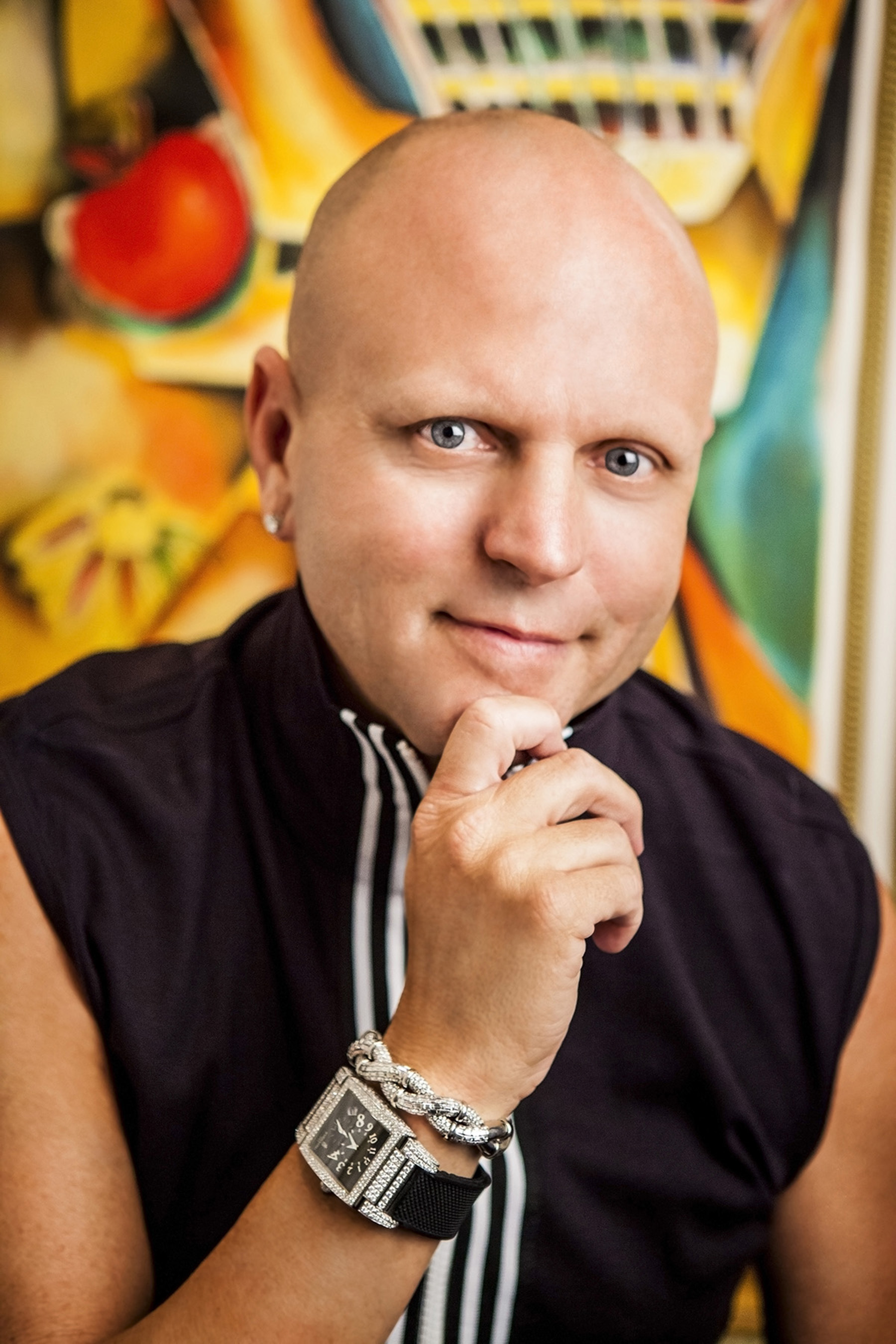

Background information
- Occupations: Poet, lyricist, music producer, art broker
- Label: Mind Juice Records

Jimmy D Robinson is a poet, lyricist, music producer, and art broker from West Palm Beach, Florida. "A Tiny Shoe," a single from his debut album Mind Juice reached number 6 on the Billboard Hot Dance Club Play chart in 2009. Robinson-produced singles "In The Night," "At Midnight," and "Lost in You" also reached the Billboard Hot Dance Club Play chart.

== Career ==
As a teen, Robinson moved to New York City and became involved in the city's disco scene. In his 20s, he lived in Columbus, Ohio. After returning to West Palm Beach and becoming homeless, Robinson began writing poetry. He later recovered from homelessness and drug addiction and began publishing his poetry. He has published 14 poetry books, some of which have been handed out as a part of the American Music Award, Grammy Award, Latin Grammy Award and Radio Music Award gift bags.

In 2005, Robinson opened an art brokerage firm, Jimmy D Robinson Inc. in West Palm Beach which includes the works of Kim Tschang-yeul, Yayoi Kusama, Lee Ufan, Yoshimoto Nara, Pablo Picasso and Henry Moore. In 2008, Robinson released Mind Juice, his first full-length album. He produced Jimmy D Robinson Presents CEEVOX in 2009. Robinson attended Art Basel in Miami Beach in 2015. In 2016, it was announced that Robinson would be releasing tracks from a collaboration with Grammy Award winning group A Flock of Seagulls.

Robinson is the president of JimmyLand Corp, a Florida-based media company.

== Singles ==
Song	Artist	Chart	Peak position
"A Tiny Shoe"	Jimmy D Robinson	US Dance Club Songs (Billboard)	6
"One More Chance"	Jimmy D Robinson feat. Melba Moore	-	-
"Heaven Earth Man"	Jimmy D Robinson feat. Carol Jiani	US Dance Club Songs (Billboard)	38
"Ageless Prince"	Jimmy D Robinson and A Flock of Seagulls	US Dance Club Songs (Billboard)	25
"Pedro"	Jimmy D Robinson and A Flock of Seagulls	US Dance Club Songs (Billboard)	33
"In the Garden"	Jimmy D Robinson and A Flock of Seagulls	-	-
"Things Change"	Jimmy D Robinson and A Flock of Seagulls	-	-

== Producer ==
Song	Artist	Chart	Peak position
'"In The Night"	Jimmy D Robinson Presents CEEVOX	US Dance Club Songs (Billboard)	4
"At Midnight"	Jimmy D Robinson Presents CEEVOX	US Dance Club Songs (Billboard)	21
"Lost In You"	Jimmy D Robinson Presents CEEVOX	US Dance Club Songs (Billboard)	34
"Broken"	Jimmy D Robinson Presents Carol Jiani	MusicWeek Upfront club Top 40	9
"Too Sophisticated"	JoAnna Michelle	US Dance Club Songs (Billboard)	22
