= Menergy (song) =

Single by Patrick Cowley

from the album Menergy - The Fusion Album
- Released: August 1981
- Studio: Automatt
- Venue: 11th & Harrison
- Genre: Hi-NRG, disco
- Length: 8:40
- Label: Fusion
- Songwriter(s): Patrick Cowley

"Menergy" is a 1981 dance single by producer Patrick Cowley.

“One day, while we were recording that album,” Marty Blecman, a former disc jockey and Cowley's business partner, wrote before his death in 1991, “We got high and I added an ‘M’ in front of title track called ‘Energy,’ and we came up with all these completely gay lyrics for it. In the end, that's what we used.”

Along with the song "I Want to Take You Home", "Menergy" spent two weeks atop the Billboard Dance/Disco chart in October and November 1981. It was Cowley's most successful single of four Top 10 dance chart hits, all of which occurred within the span of 15 months. As with Cowley's other singles, "Menergy" did not place on any other chart in the USA. In 1984, a posthumous version of "Menergy" was released where Sylvester's vocals were featured.

It was used in 2009 in the trailer for the video game Grand Theft Auto IV: The Ballad of Gay Tony, as well as the in-game radio station K109 The Studio. Most recently, it was featured in the Netflix series Dahmer – Monster: The Jeffrey Dahmer Story.

== Charts ==
| Chart (1981–1982) | Peak position |
|---|---|
| Belgium (Ultratop 50 Flanders) | 18 |
| Netherlands (Single Top 100) | 31 |
| Switzerland (Schweizer Hitparade) | 5 |
| US Dance Club Songs (Billboard) | 1 |
