= Megatron Man =

Single by Patrick Cowley

from the album Megatron Man
- Released: April 1981
- Recorded: January–February 1981
- Genre: Hi-NRG, disco
- Length: 9:08
- Songwriter: Patrick Cowley

"Megatron Man" is a 1981 dance single by producer Patrick Cowley, released by Megatone Records. It charted at No. 2 on the Billboard Hot Dance Music/Club Play chart in 1981 and was the first track on his second album, Megatron Man, issued the same year.

== Notes ==
- Per the bonus material in The Return of Mister X (1987), the man pictured in the art is comic book character Mister X.
