= Alfonso Muskedunder =

Single by Todd Terje

from the album It's Album Time
- B-side: "Remixes"
- Released: 30 March 2015
- Recorded: 2012–2014
- Genre: Nu jazz; jazz fusion; bossa nova
- Length: 3:25
- Label: Olsen
- Songwriter: Terje Olsen
- Producer: Todd Terje

Todd Terje singles chronology
"Johnny and Mary" (2014)	"Alfonso Muskedunder" (2015)

Music video
- "Alfonso Muskedunder" on YouTube

"Alfonso Muskedunder" is a song by Norwegian DJ Todd Terje from his debut studio album It's Album Time. It was released as the sixth single from the album on 30 March 2015 with a 12" vinyl release consisting of remixes. A music video for the song was published on Terje's YouTube channel.

The song was used in the Better Call Saul episode "Sunk Costs", during a montage of attorney Kim Wexler's morning routine.

== Music video ==
The music video for "Alfonso Muskedunder" was released on April 7, 2015 on Terje's YouTube channel at a total length of three minutes and forty-seven seconds. The video was made by Bendik Kaltenborn and Espen Friberg and is completely animated.

== Track listing ==
- Alfonso Muskedunder Remixed

Side A
No.	Title	Length
1.	"Alfonso Muskedunder" (Deetron Remix)
2.	"Alfonso Muskedunder" (Bullion Remix)

Side B
No.	Title	Length
1.	"Alfonso Muskedunder" (Mungolian Jetset Remix)
2.	"Alfonso Muskedunder" (Mungolian Vs Tangoterje Dub)

== Release history ==
Region	Date	Label	Format	Catalogue no.
Worldwide	30 March 2015	Olsen	Digital download	—
Norway	30 March 2015	Olsen	12"	OLS010
