= It's Album Time =

Studio album by Todd Terje
- Released: 8 April 2014
- Recorded: 2011–2014
- Genre: Nu-disco; electro-disco; space disco; exotica; lounge
- Length: 59:10 (CD); 52:26 (vinyl)
- Label: Olsen
- Producer: Todd Terje

Todd Terje chronology
It's the Arps (2012)	It's Album Time (2014)	The Big Cover-Up (2016)

Singles from It's Album Time
- 1. "Inspector Norse" Released: 19 June 2012; 2. "Strandbar" Released: 2013; 3. "Delorean Dynamite" Released: 10 February 2014; 4. "Leisure Suit Preben" Released: 27 March 2014; 5. "Johnny and Mary" Released: 7 April 2014; 6. "Alfonso Muskedunder" Released: 30 March 2015

It's Album Time is the debut studio album by Norwegian DJ and record producer Todd Terje, released on 8 April 2014 by Olsen Records. The album was self-produced by Terje and was recorded in a span of three years. It was met with generally positive reviews from music critics. The album debuted at number 2 in Norway, number 4 on the Billboard Dance/Electronic Albums chart, number 23 on the UK Albums Chart, and number 6 on the UK Dance Albums chart.

Six singles have been released: "Inspector Norse", "Strandbar", "Delorean Dynamite", "Leisure Suit Preben", "Johnny and Mary" featuring Bryan Ferry, and "Alfonso Muskedunder".

== Background ==
The album includes Terje's 2012 track "Inspector Norse", which became Mixmag's best track of 2012, and came second on Resident Advisor's list of the 50 best tracks of 2012. It also includes an edited version of the "Disco Mix" of 2013 single "Strandbar", as well as a lightly edited version of "Swing Star", from his 2012 extended play It's the Arps—which also featured "Inspector Norse". Jim Carroll of The Irish Times placed Terje's track "Strandbar" at number eighteen on his list of the best tracks of 2013. The album's sole collaboration comes from Bryan Ferry, the lead singer of Roxy Music, on a cover of Robert Palmer's "Johnny and Mary".

The album's cover art was designed by Bendik Kaltenborn who also designs illustrations for The New Yorker magazine; his illustrations often complement the humour column, "Shouts & Murmurs", and the event listings in the beginning of the magazine. Terje became acquainted with Kaltenborn about ten years ago in a branch of the Dutch chain Free Record Shop, where they were both working, and quickly bonded over what Kaltenborn calls "crazy nonsense stupid humor."

The vinyl version of It's Album Time features edited versions of "Delorean Dynamite", "Johnny and Mary" and "Swing Star", and is featured at a playback speed of 45 rpm instead of the usual 33 1/3 rpm. In Japan, a bonus disc titled It's Album Time (Bonus Tracks) was packaged with the album, and features edited versions of many of the album's songs. Included is the full "Leisure Suit Preben" single, as well as the edits featured on the vinyl version of the album; the edit for "Delorean Dynamite" removes the ambient outro and crossfade from "Strandbar", as featured on all album pressings, for this bonus collection.

== Critical reception ==
Professional ratings
Aggregate scores
Source	Rating
AnyDecentMusic?	7.7/10
Metacritic	79/100
Review scores
Source	Rating
AllMusic	3/5 stars
The Guardian	3/5 stars
The Independent	4/5 stars
Mixmag	4/5
Mojo	4/5 stars
NME	8/10
Pitchfork	8.7/10
Q	4/5 stars
Resident Advisor	4.5/5
Spin	8/10

It's Album Time was met with generally positive reviews from music critics. At Metacritic, which assigns a normalized rating out of 100 to reviews from critics, the album received an average score of 79 based on 30 reviews, indicating "generally favorable reviews". Mike Powell of Pitchfork awarded the album their "Best New Music" tag, writing "Despite recycling four of its twelve tracks from previously released singles and EPs, It's Album Time has a linear, cohesive feel. Instead of trying to top "Strandbar" or "Inspector Norse", Terje ties them together with short interstitial tracks—valleys that give perspective to the mountains." Zander Porter of Consequence of Sound stated "It's Album Time gestures towards Olsen's growing confidence as a producer and newfound preparedness for curating a collection of his own musical pieces. Featuring a robust range in pace, imagery, and vocal implementation, the record is the most eclectic and thought-out work from Olsen to date." Matt Oliver of Clash gave the album a score of 8 out of 10, stating "Terje comes out the other side ready to invigorate for a second time, a mite more determined and showing disheartenment (or getting too high, for that matter) shouldn't last too long. Its encased plasticity doesn't mask any novelty. Athletic brightness betters gaudiness while wearing ’80s fashions well, banging out rhythms with fingers that've have just come from the cake bowl. It's album time, and Terje feels epic". Terje has been praised for "masterfully... reviv[ing] old styles and makes them flourish on their own terms".

Alexis Petridis of The Guardian was mixed in his assessment of the record, writing "There's certainly nothing wrong with a producer as talented as Terje feeling constrained by the style of music that's made him famous and wanting to spread his wings. It's just that the areas that Terje spreads his wings into feel a bit hackneyed." On the album, Tim Senda of AllMusic wrote "Terje should set aside the experiments and just focus on making sleek and shiny electro-disco tracks; the rest only gets in the way of a good time."

The album was recognized as one of The 100 Best Albums of the Decade So Far by Pitchfork in August 2014. The magazine later placed it at #98 on its list of The 200 Best Albums of the 2010s, calling it "[a} cosmic cocktail-lounge fantasia".

== Track listing ==
=== CD pressings ===
All music is composed by Terje Olsen, except track 4 written by Bosse Norgren and track 7 written by Robert Palmer.

No.	Title	Length
1.	"Intro (It's Album Time)"	1:40
2.	"Leisure Suit Preben"	4:20
3.	"Preben Goes to Acapulco"	4:35
4.	"Svensk Sås" ("Swedish Sauce")	2:43
5.	"Strandbar" ("Beach Bar")	4:28
6.	"Delorean Dynamite"	6:45
7.	"Johnny and Mary" (featuring Bryan Ferry)	6:32
8.	"Alfonso Muskedunder"	3:24
9.	"Swing Star (Part 1)"	4:18
10.	"Swing Star (Part 2)"	6:17
11.	"Oh Joy"	7:09
12.	"Inspector Norse"	6:59

It's Album Time (Bonus Tracks) Japanese bonus disc
No.	Title	Length
1.	"Leisure Suit Preben" (single edit)	4:37
2.	"Preben Goes to Acapulco" (single edit)	5:06
3.	"Johnny and Mary" (radio edit; featuring Bryan Ferry)	5:06
4.	"Oh Joy" (radio edit)	4:06
5.	"Svensk Sås" ("Swedish Sauce"; long version)	2:43
6.	"Delorean Dynamite" (radio edit)	3:41
7.	"Johnny and Mary" (instrumental)	6:50
8.	"Strandbar" ("Beach Bar"; Samba radio edit)	4:08
10.	"Swing Star" (short edit)	7:05
Total length:		44:08

=== Vinyl pressings ===
Side A
No.	Title	Length
1.	"Intro (It's Album Time)"	1:40
2.	"Leisure Suit Preben"	4:20
3.	"Preben Goes to Acapulco"	4:35
Total length:		10:38

Side B
No.	Title	Length
1.	"Svensk Sås" ("Swedish Sauce")	2:43
2.	"Strandbar" ("Beach Bar")	4:28
3.	"Delorean Dynamite"	4:52
Total length:		12:02

Side C
No.	Title	Length
1.	"Johnny and Mary" (featuring Bryan Ferry)	5:05
2.	"Alfonso Muskedunder"	3:24
3.	"Swing Star"	7:04
Total length:		15:30

Side D
No.	Title	Length
1.	"Oh Joy"	7:09
2.	"Inspector Norse"	6:59
Total length:		14:08

== Charts ==
Chart (2014)	Peak position
Australian Hitseekers Albums (ARIA)	5
Belgian Albums (Ultratop Flanders)	36
Belgian Albums (Ultratop Wallonia)	93
Dutch Albums (Album Top 100)	64
French Albums (SNEP)	72
Irish Albums (IRMA)	76
Japanese Albums (Oricon)	225
Norwegian Albums (VG-lista)	2
Swiss Albums (Schweizer Hitparade)	67
UK Albums (OCC)	23
UK Dance Albums (OCC)	6
UK Independent Albums (OCC)	3
US Billboard 200	120
US Dance/Electronic Albums (Billboard)	4
US Independent Albums (Billboard)	22
