= Barbara Pennington =

American singer (1954 – 2023)

- Born: 1954; Greenville, Mississippi, United States
- Died: August 3, 2023 (aged 68–69)
- Genres: Blues, Soul, Disco, Hi-NRG
- Occupation: Singer
- Years active: 1970s–1990s
- Labels: Island Records, United Artists Records, Record Shack Records

Barbara Pennington (1954 – 2023) was an American Hi-NRG and soul music artist who was active during the 1970s and the 1980s.

== History and career ==
Pennington was born in Greenville, Mississippi in 1954, and her family moved to Chicago when she was very young. She began her music career in the latter city as a member of a quartet called the Feminiques starting in 1969. The group released one record on Chicago’s B&L label by 1970 before breaking up the next year. Pennington performed with several other groups in the following years before going solo in 1973.

Pennington’s career began picking up considerable steam after she connected with British songwriter and producer Ian Levine, who had traveled to Chicago in 1975 in large part to meet her. He was intrigued by how similar her voice sounded to that of Linda Jones (which was by design, since she trained her voice by mimicking Jones, Chaka Khan, and other notable female soul singers of the era), and he appreciated that she simultaneously brought her own style to her music, so he signed her to Island Records.

According to Levine, Pennington’s first releases with Island did not see as much success as those of Evelyn Thompson and L.J. Johnson, who had also been signed to the label by Levine around the same time. Then, in 1976, Pennington released her single “Twenty Four Hours A Day,” which gained considerable popularity among Northern Soul fans in the UK. Martin Davis subsequently signed the single to United Artists Records, after which it released in the US and hit #4 on the Billboard Disco Chart in 1977.

Later that year, Pennington hit #20 with her single “You Are The Music Within Me”. In 1985, her singles “Fan The Flame” and “On A Crowded Street” made the charts at #62 and #57, respectively.

Barbara retired in the early 1990s and died in 2023 after a battle with dementia.

== Discography ==
=== Albums ===
- Midnight Ride (1978, United Artists Records)
- Out Of The Darkest Night (1985, Record Shack Records)
- The Best Of Barbara Pennington (1995, Hot Productions)

=== Singles and EPs ===
- “Running In Another Direction” (1976)
- “Spend A Little Time With Me / All Time Loser” (1976)
- “I Can’t Erase The Thoughts Of You” (1976)
- “Twenty Four Hours A Day” (1976)
- “You Are The Music Within Me” (1977)
- “Spend A Little Time With Me” (1978)
- “Midnight Ride” (1978)
- “All Time Loser” (1978)
- “All American Boy” (1984)
- “Way Down Deep In My Soul / All American Boy (Remix)” (1984) UK #119
- “On a Crowded Street” (1985) UK #57
- “Fan The Flame” (1985) UK #62
- “Out Of The Darkest Night” (1986)
- “Don’t Stop The World” (1986)
- “There Are Brighter Days” (1987)
- “I’ve Been A Bad Girl” (1988)

== Trivia ==
- According to Levine, the 1985 Carol Jiani song “Vanity” was originally recorded by Pennington, but she ultimately did not want to release the track out of a desire to transition out of hi-NRG music and back to soul music at the time.
