= DJ Zany =

Dutch disc jockey

Zany
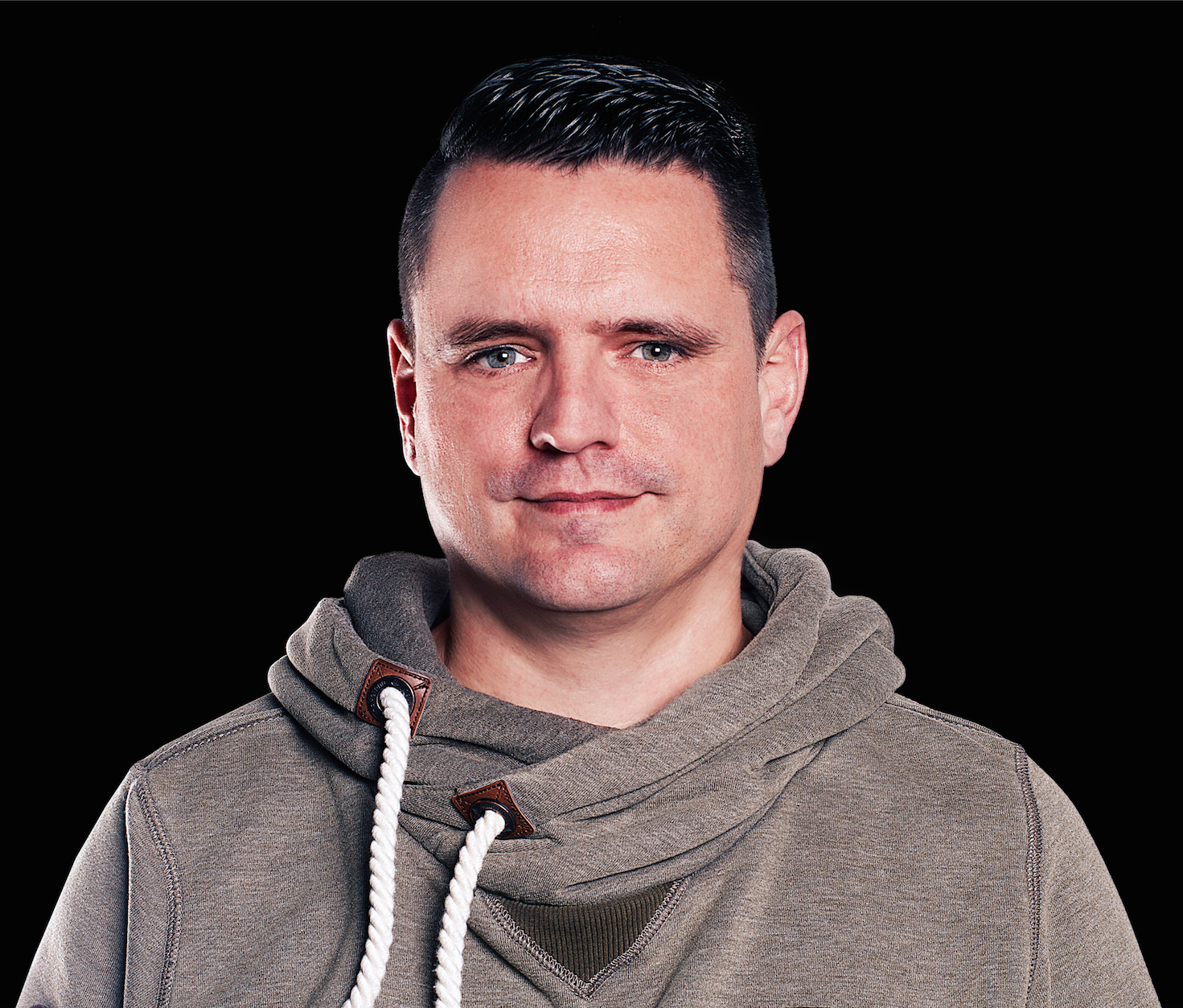

Background information
- Born: Raoul van Grinsven; 11 May 1974 (age 52); Beek en Donk, Netherlands
- Genres: Hardstyle
- Occupations: DJ; Producer
- Years active: 1998–present
- Label: Fusion Records
- Website: www.djzany.nl

Raoul van Grinsven (known more commonly as DJ Zany or Zany; born 11 May 1974) is a Dutch disc jockey and former member of Shadowlands Terrorists, now specialising in hardstyle. He is currently the owner of Fusion Records.

Zany's 2002 song Be On Your Way has been used as the "Walk on" music for professional darts player Ted Hankey.

== Biography ==
Zany lives in Veldhoven, near Eindhoven. After training as a chef, Zany worked for ten years in an Eindhoven record store. He started as a producer of techno and trance before he started focusing on hardstyle. He has toured abroad both with the Shadowlands Terrorists and performing under his own name.

From 2001, using a variety of pseudonyms, Zany produced EPs and remixes for the Fusion label.

In 2002, Zany started a project under the name Donkey Rollers, which was aired at the Defqon.1 Festival as an act in 2005.

In 2005, Zany gained third place at the Dutch Dance Awards.

== Discography ==
Release	Alias	Label	Year
Be On Your Way	Zany	Fusion Records	2002
Rock The Beatz	Zany	Fusion Records	2002
Hectik / In My Mind	Zany	Fusion Records	2002
Sky High / Funk Bass	Zany	Fusion Records	2003
House Muzik / Razzia!	Zany	Fusion Records	2004
Pillzz / Forentic	Zany	Fusion Records	2004
Xpander / Tekno	Zany	Fusion Records	2004
Dissin' / Our Power	Zany vs Duro	Fusion Records	2005
Pure / Sky High (Technoboy Remix)	Zany	Fusion Records	2005
Science & Religion	Zany	Q-Dance	2005
Thugs / Freakz	Zany	Fusion Records	2005
Deep Inside / Feel The Drumz	Zany	Fusion Records	2005
Front 2 Back / Wise Guys	Zany & Tatanka	Fusion Records	2006
Midnight	The Beholder Meets Zany	Seismic	2006
What U Need	Isaac & Zany	X-Rate	2006
Widowmaker / Spunk	Zany	Fusion Records	2006
Back Again / Hasta La Pasta	Zany & Duro	Dutch Master Works	2007
Volt / Inflator	Zany	Fusion Records	2007
Annihilating / Who Wants This	Zany Meets The Beholder	Fusion Records	2007
Nothing Else Matters / Fever	Zany & DV8	Fusion Records	2007
Euphoria / Fear Reigns Today	The Beholder Meets Zany	Seismic	2008
The Fusion Of Sound	Zany	Fusion Records	2008
The Fusion Of Sound - Album Sampler 1	Zany	Fusion Records	2008
The Fusion Of Sound - Album Sampler 2	Zany	Fusion Records	2009
The Fusion Of Sound - Album Sampler 3	Zany	Fusion Records	2009
Vision	Zany & DV8	Fusion Records	2009
Do You Want Heavy	Zany & The Beholder	Fusion Records	2009
Maximum Force (Defqon.1 Australia Anthem 2009)	Zany	Q-dance	2009
Fruxaq / Huwex	Zany & Dozer	Fusion Records	2010
Mr. Monster	Zany	Fusion Records	2010
To Protect & Serve	Zany & The Beholder	TiLLT! Records	2010
The Great Zany Show	Zany	Fusion Records Special	2010
Paranoid / Diffusion / Diavoli	Zany & Noisecontrollers	Fusion Records	2010
Psychedelic Trip	Zany	Fusion Records	2010
Bang The Bass	Zany & Brennan Heart	Fusion Records	2010
Ghoulish Delight	Zany	Fusion Records	2011
Oldskool / Tanz Electrik (The R3bels Remix)	Zatox & Zany	Italian Hardstyle	2011
Remix Pack	Zany	Fusion Records	2011
Again We Will Rise / Act Of Rage	Zany & The Beholder	Fusion Records	2011
Son Of Torture	Zany & Ran-D feat. Nikkita	Fusion Records	2011
World On Fire	Zany & DV8	Fusion Records	2011
Sound Intense City (Decibel Anthem 2011)	Zany & Max Enforcer Ft. MC DV8	Gold Records	2011
Symphonic Feedback (Titan Remix)	Zany	Fusion Records	2011
Worship	Zany	Fusion Records	2011
Squared	Zany	Fusion Records	2012
Lonely Dark	Zany & Nitrouz	Fusion Records	2012
Distorted (B-Front Remix)	Zany & DV8	Fusion Records	2012
Planet Zany	Zany	Fusion Records	2012
Causing Hysteria	Zany	Fusion Records	2013
Redeeming Light	Zany & B-Front	Fusion Records	2013
Quakers	Zany & Frequencerz	Fusion Records	2013
Dikke Vette Bassplaat	ZaZaFront (Zany / DV8 / B-Front)	Q-Dance	2016
