= One Look (One Look Was Enough) =

Song by Paul Parker

"One Look (One Look Was Enough)" is a 1988 dance single by San Francisco based disco/dance singer Paul Parker. The single was his second of two entries to make it to #1 on the dance charts. Parker's singles charted exclusively on the dance charts.
