= Todd Terje =

Norwegian disc jockey (born 1981)

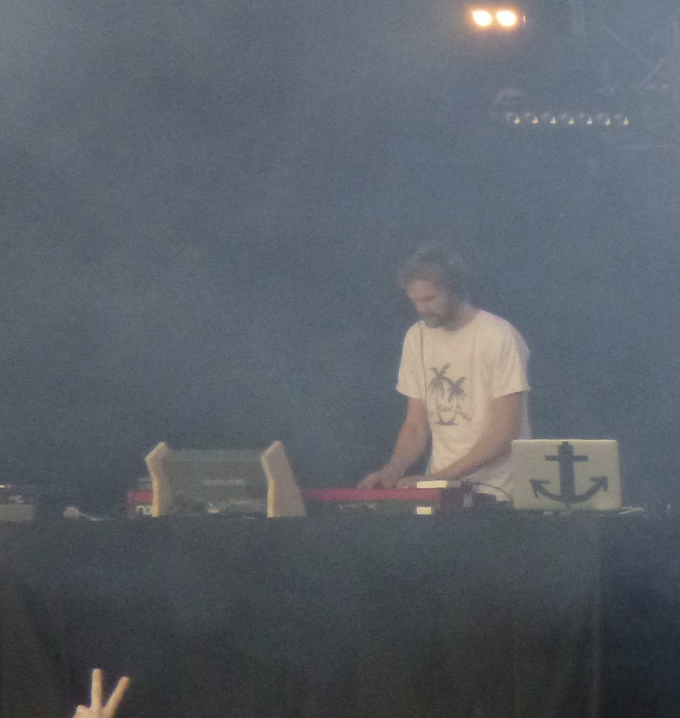
- Todd Terje & The Olsens performing at Glastonbury Festival in 2015

Background information
- Also known as: Wade Nichols, Duliatten Disco Dandia, Chuck Norris, New Mjøndalen Disco Swingers, Kacic Kullmann's Five
- Born: May 1981 (age 45); Mjøndalen, Norway
- Genres: Electronica; nu-disco; disco; house; synthwave
- Instruments: Arpeggiator, keyboards, drum machine, sequencer, sampler
- Years active: 1999–present
- Labels: Permanent Vacation, Because Music, Soul Jazz Records, Bear Funk, Full Pupp, Running Back, Smalltown Supersound, Olsen
- Website: toddterje.com

Terje Olsen (born 1981), known professionally as Todd Terje, is a Norwegian DJ, songwriter, and record producer. His stage name is a homage to house music producer Todd Terry.

Called "King of the summer jams" by Mixmag, "one third of the Holy Trinity of Norwegian disco" by Spin magazine, and "one of [the Scandinavian dance scene's] prominent figures" by AllMusic, Todd Terje made his name with a string of remixes and re-edits in the mid 2000s. He is the younger brother of Olaf Olsen, known as the drummer from Bigbang, who often performs drums for Terje's live shows.

He was one of the headliners at the prestigious Sónar festival in Barcelona, playing alongside frequent collaborator Lindstrøm. He was listed at #17 in the Rolling Stone magazine list of "The 25 DJs That Rule the Earth". In July 2013 he recorded a mix for BBC Radio 1's Essential Mix series. He is best known for his 2012 house track "Inspector Norse". The song Alfonso Muskedunder was featured in an episode of the third season of the television series Better Call Saul on AMC. The introduction to It's Album Time is regularly referenced in a feature in Radio 1 DJ, Huw Stephens' late night show.

In 2017, he was nominated for Record of the Year for the Four Tet Remix of his song "Jungelknugen" at the Electronic Music Awards. The original version of this track, however, has not been released officially as of August 2023.

== Collaborations ==
Terje co-wrote the Robbie Williams song "Candy" that reached the Top 10 charts in many European countries and reached #1 on the UK charts.

In 2013, Terje collaborated with Scottish indie rock band Franz Ferdinand on material for their fourth studio album, Right Thoughts, Right Words, Right Action, co-producing two tracks.

He mixed and edited Lindstrøm's album Smalhans, which led to further collaboration. The pair recorded the single "Lanzarote", which was released on Olsen Records in January 2013, and later in the year embarked on a tour that included gigs at Nuits Sonores, Sónar, and Melt!.. Throughout 2014 and 2015, Terje has performed on multiple festivals across the world, such as Coachella, Lowlands and Pitchfork Festival. On stage, he is joined by his brother Olaf and percussionist Martin Windstad.

Terje recorded a cover of Robert Palmer's 1980 single "Johnny & Mary" with Bryan Ferry. The track appeared on Terje's debut album It's Album Time and was also released as a single.

In 2016, Todd Terje released The Big Cover-Up, an EP consisting of covers by Disco artists, such as Boney M and Yellow Magic Orchestra as Todd Terje and the Olsens.

== Discography ==
=== Studio albums ===
List of studio albums, with selected chart positions
| Title | Album details | Peak chart positions | | | | | | | | |
| Title | Album details | NOR | BEL (Fl) | BEL (Wa) | FR | NED | SWI | UK | US | US Dance |
|---|---|---|---|---|---|---|---|---|---|---|
| It's Album Time | Released: 8 April 2014; Label: Olsen Records; Formats: CD, LP, digital download | 2 | 36 | 94 | 72 | 64 | 67 | 23 | 120 | 4 |

=== Compilations ===
| Year | Album details |
|---|---|
| 2010 | Remaster of the Universe: Released: 21 May 2010; Label: Permanent Vacation; Format: CD, digital download |
| 2010 | An Anthology: Weighed & Measured: Released: 28 August 2010; Label: Not on label (Unofficial); Format: CD |
| 2010 | The Red Album: Released: 28 August 2010; Label: Not on label (Unofficial); Format: CD |

=== Extended plays ===
| Year | Title | Release date | Label |
|---|---|---|---|
| 2005 | Mjøndalen Diskoklubb | 1 January 2005 | Full Pupp |
| 2005 | Eurodans | 4 April 2005 | Full Pupp |
| 2011 | Ragysh | 4 April 2011 | Running Back |
| 2012 | It's the Arps | 9 January 2012 | Olsen Records |
| 2014 | Delorean Dynamite | 22 April 2014 | Olsen Records |
| 2015 | Alfonso Muskedunder Remixed | 6 April 2015 | Olsen Records |
| 2016 | The Big Cover-Up (with the Olsens) | 17 June 2016 | Olsen Records |

=== Singles ===
| Year | Single | Peak positions | | | Album |
| Year | Single | BEL (Fl) | FRA | NED | Album |
|---|---|---|---|---|---|
| 2012 | "Inspector Norse" | 9 | — | 88 | It's the Arps |
| 2013 | "Lanzarote" (with Lindstrøm) | — | — | — | Non-album single |
| 2013 | "Strandbar" | — | — | — | Non-album single |
| 2013 | "Spiral" | — | — | — | Non-album single |
| 2014 | "Delorean Dynamite" | 56 | — | — | It's Album Time |
| 2014 | "Leisure Suit Preben" | — | — | — | It's Album Time |
| 2014 | "Johnny and Mary" (featuring Bryan Ferry) | — | 185 | — | It's Album Time |
| 2015 | "Alfonso Muskedunder" | — | — | — | It's Album Time |

=== Vinyl singles ===
| Year | Title | Release date | Label |
|---|---|---|---|
| 2004 | Bodies (split with Akwaaba) | 1 September 2004 | Bear Funk |
| 2004 | Eurodans / Reinbagan | 15 November 2004 | Soul Jazz Records |

=== Remixes ===
| Year | Artist | Track | Title |
|---|---|---|---|
| 2005 | Snuten featuring Fox N' Wolf | "Wild and Free (Claws Against Knives)" | Todd Terje Night Version |
| 2006 | Antena | "Camino Del Sol" | |
| 2006 | Felix Laband | "Whistling In Tongues" | |
| 2006 | Lindstrøm | "Another Station" | |
| 2007 | Kaoru Inoue | "The Secret Field" | |
| 2007 | Reverso 68 | "Piece Together" | Todd Terje Remix #2; Todd Terje Spinning Star Mix |
| 2007 | Studio | "Life's A Beach!" | Todd Terje Beach House Mix |
| 2008 | Arbeid Adelt! | "Death Disco" | Todd Terje Edit |
| 2008 | Chaz Jankel | "Glad to Know You" | Todd Terje Edit |
| 2008 | Dølle Jølle | "Balearic Incarnation" | Todd Terje‘s Extra Døll Mix |
| 2008 | José González | "Killing for Love" | Todd Terje Brokeback Mix |
| 2008 | Simon Baker | "Plastik" | Todd Terje Trkatech Remix |
| 2009 | Gichy Dan's Beachwood #9 | "On a Day Like Today" | Todd Terje's Friendly Children |
| 2009 | M | "Pop Muzik" | |
| 2009 | Rogue Cat | "Magic Journey" | |
| 2009 | Shit Robot | "Simple Things" | Todd Terje Version |
| 2011 | Bombay Bicycle Club | "Lights Out, Words Gone" | |
| 2011 | Bryan Ferry | "Alphaville" | |
| 2011 | Claudja Barry | "Sweet Dynamite" | Todd Terje Edit |
| 2011 | Mungolian Jetset | "Moon Jocks 'n' Prog Rocks" | Todd Terje's Schlong Tong Vocal Version; Todd Terje's Even Stiv-En Dub Version |
| 2011 | The Units | "High Pressure Days" | Todd Terje Disco Mix |
| 2012 | Bepu N'Gali | "I Travel to You" | |
| 2012 | Bjørn Torske | "Langt Fra Afrika" | Todd Terje's Enda Lengre Miks (Fra Afrika Altså) |
| 2012 | Joakim | "Nothing Gold" | Todd Terje Remix; Todd Terje DJ Tool |
| 2012 | Gary's Gang | "Keep On Dancing" | |
| 2012 | Hot Chip | "How Do You Do?" | |
| 2012 | Roxy Music | "Love Is the Drug" | Todd Terje Disco Dub |
| 2013 | Bryan Ferry | "Don't Stop the Dance" | |
| 2014 | Dolly Parton | "Jolene" | |
| 2015 | Jaga Jazzist | "Oban" | |
| 2016 | Beranek | "Dra Te Hælvete" | Todd Terje Edit; Todd Terje Disco Dub; Todd Terje Acid Remix |

=== Edits ===
Todd Terje has many unofficially released disco edits under various pseudonyms. Many of them are released without credits. List contains officially released edits.

| Year | Artist | Track | Title |
|---|---|---|---|
| 2012 | Aksel Friberg | "To Be There With You" | Disco Mix |
| 2012 | Aksel Friberg | "Viking Music" | Disco Mix |
| 2012 | Lindstrøm | "Eg-ged-osis" | Todd Terje Extended Edit |
| 2012 | Lindstrøm | "Ra-ako-st" | Todd Terje Extended Edit |
| 2013 | Franz Ferdinand | "Evil Eye" | Todd Terje Extended Mix |
| 2013 | Franz Ferdinand | "Stand on the Horizon" | Todd Terje Extended Mix |
| 2013 | Lindstrøm | "Faar-i-kaal" | Todd Terje Extended Edit |
| 2013 | Lindstrøm | "Vos-sako-rv" | Todd Terje Extended Edit; Todd Terje Extended Mix - Dub Version |
