= Carol Jiani =

Nigerian-born UK singer

- Born: Uchenna Carol Ikejiani; Nigeria
- Genres: Hi-NRG, post-disco
- Occupations: Singer, songwriter, recording artist
- Instrument: Vocals
- Years active: 1978–present
- Labels: Previously MCA, later known as the Universal group

Carol Jiani (born Uchenna Carol Ikejiani) is a Nigerian-born singer based in the United Kingdom, best known for her 1981 hit "Hit 'N Run Lover".

== Career ==
Uchenna Carol Ikejiani was born in Nigeria to an Igbo family. She moved to Canada as a college student in the mid-1970s.

In autumn 1978, she auditioned to appear on Joe La Greca's album Montreal. In early 1978, Jiani recorded two tracks for the project, "If You Believe in Me" and "Higher and Higher". These were released on an EP, with her credited under her birth name. Glenn LaRusso of Salsoul Records convinced her to shorten her name from Uchenna Carol Ikejiani to Carol Jiani to make it easier for North Americans to pronounce.

In 1980, Carol Jiani recorded two Sandy Wilbur-written pieces with La Greca, "Hit 'N Run Lover" and "All The People of the World". "Hit 'N Run Lover" was remixed by San Francisco-based Moby Dick Records for their Gold Standard imprint and would become Jiani's signature song, peaking at number 4 on the US Billboard Club Play Singles chart in 1981. On the heels of "Hit N Run Lover"'s success, Matra Records commissioned a complete album, also titled Hit 'N Run Lover. "The Woman in Me" was the album's second single but its B-side, the uptempo "Mercy", written by Pete Bellotte and Sylvester Levay which exceeded the A-side in popularity among DJs becoming another hit for Jiani. "Mercy", the only track on the album not composed by Sandy Wilbur, was recorded earlier by Judy Cheeks. A follow-up album, Ask Me was released the next year generating the singles "Ask Me", "X-Rated" and "You're Gonna Lose My Love". In 1982, Jiani recorded vocals for "Get Up and Do It Again". The song was a hit, as was the second version recorded by Mizz lead singer, Michelle Mills.

At the end of 1983, she released her last Joe LaGreca production, "Touch And Go Lover" for the Canadian label Telescope. The song was also remixed by Step Pettibone and for the US by John Robie. A total of 7 songs was recorded but the album was not released. Two more singles were released, "Dancing in the Rain" and a cover of "Don't Leave Me This Way". Eventually all songs were released in 1984 on a 12" in the UK by the label Streetwave.

In 1984, Jiani moved to England and soon signed with Record Shack to record "Vanity" with producer Ian Levine. Barbara Pennington had previously recorded the track but declined to release it to focus exclusively on soul music. Jiani's "Vanity", released in 1985, was a hit reaching number 1 on the UK Hi-NRG Club chart. Levine secured her a deal with MCA Records, and she released "Such A Joy Honey". According to Levine, "Turning My Back And Walking Away" was to have been her second single for MCA until she was dropped from the label. MCA gave the recording to Levine and the single was quickly released by his Nightmare Records label in 1987. Levine and Jiani went on to produce a full album for Hot Records, The Best of Carol Jiani, featuring a re-recording of "Hit 'N Run Lover", as well as brand new material.

Jiani returned to Canada to again work with Joe La Greca on her 1996 album, Superstar. It produced two singles, "Come and Get Your Love" and "Superstar".

After Superstar, Jiani maintained a low-profile and released few recordings until the late 2000s, when she made another comeback by working with contemporary dance music producers like Laurent Pautrat and Mondo. Jiani also reunited with Ian Levine to provide vocals on the track "Work My Fingers to the Bone" for his album Northern Soul 2007. Levine and Jiani also recorded a cover of France Joli's "Come To Me".

Early 2008 saw Carol Jiani recording new material with producers Chris Richards & Peter Wilson. One of the first songs to emerge, "I Don't Wanna Talk About Love", featured on the Klone Records compilation, Mad About The Boy 16. In May 2010, "Broken", Jiani's collaboration with Jimmy D Robinson, peaked at No. 9 on Music Week's UK Upfront Club chart.

12 June 2015, Carol Jiani on vocals in Jason Parker Meets Naxwell feat. Carol Jiani "Hold That Sucker Down" 2018: "Deeper Love" Phoenix Lord Feat Carol Jiani.2018 "No More" Carol Jiani Feat Edge.

== Discography ==
=== Albums ===
Hit 'N Run Lover (1981)
No.	Title	Writer(s)	Length
1.	"Hit 'N Run Lover"	Sandy Wilbur	8:10
2.	"Can't Get Enough"	Sandy Wilbur	6:45
3.	"Mercy"	Pete Bellotte, Sylvester Levay	6:34
4.	"The Woman in Me"	Sandy Wilbur	6:34
5.	"High Cost of Loving"	Sandy Wilbur	7:00
6.	"All The People in the World"	Sandy Wilbur	7:31

Ask Me (1982)
No.	Title	Writer(s)	Length
1.	"Ask Me"	Barbara Gaskins	6:20
2.	"Whisper"	Harold Fisher, Kathleen Dyson	5:25
3.	"X-Rated"	Kathleen Dyson	5:03
4.	"You're Gonna Lose My Love"		5:25
5.	"Seeing You"	Kathleen Dyson, Warren Williams	5:30
6.	"Kicking The Habit"	Sandy Wilbur	6:05
7.	"Your Heart Is Safe"	Sandy Wilbur	3:50

Hit 'N Run Lover: The Best of Carol Jiani (1995)
No.	Title	Length
1.	"Hit 'N Run Lover"	6:07
2.	"Get on Up And Do It Again"	6:05
3.	"Highwire"	6:05
4.	"River Deep, Mountain High"	4:46
5.	"Souvenirs"	4:29
6.	"Vanity"	3:26
7.	"Turning My Back And Walking Away"	5:19
8.	"Such A Joy Honey"	4:01
9.	"Just Us"	5:18
10.	"Spirit"	3:51
11.	"Get My Message Through"	3:10
12.	"Spinning You Around"	3:50
13.	"Make Sure You Have Someone Who Loves You"	5:49
14.	"That's How It Is (If You Love Me)"	4:05
15.	"Run To Me Now"	2:54
16.	"Pull It Back Together"	2:51
17.	"I'm Your Guarantee"	4:25

Superstar (1996)
No.	Title	Length
1.	"Superstar"	5:49
2.	"Come and Get Your Love"	5:23
3.	"Play With Me"	5:27
4.	"We Will Rock You"	5:58
5.	"Don't Break My Heart"	5:39
6.	"I Wanna Love"	4:50
7.	"Love Me Like I Love You"	5:22
8.	"Move Your Body"	5:08
9.	"Sit Tight"	5:15
10.	"I Need Your Love"	6:11
11.	"Love Is What You Need"	6:58

=== EP's ===
- Montreal, Featuring Uchenna Ikejiani, Salsoul Records SA 8519 (1978)

=== Singles ===
- 1981: "Hit 'N Run Lover"
- 1981: "The Woman in Me" / "Mercy"
- 1982: "Ask Me"
- 1982 "You're Gonna Lose My Love"
- 1982: "X-Rated"
- 1984: "Dancing in the Rain"
- 1984: "Touch and Go Lover"
- 1984: "Love Now Pay Later"
- 1985: "Don't Leave Me This Way"
- 1985: "Vanity"
- 1987: "Such A Joy Honey"
- 1987: "Turning My Back and Walking Away"
- 1988: "Hit 'N Run Lover '88"
- 1988: "Funkin' For The UK" with 3 Man Island
- 1989: "Car Wash" with 3 Man Island
- 1990: "It Should Have Been Me"
- 1990: "No Matter Where"
- 1994: "I Didn't Know"
- 1995: "Come and Get Your Love"
- 1995: "Superstar"
- 1996: "Kiss You All Over"
- 2000: "Hit 'N Run Lover 2000"
- 2000: "The Queen"
- 2005: "It's Raining Men"
- 2006: "Hit'n Run Lover 2006"
- 2007: "Somebody Else's Guy"
- 2007: "Stop the Music" with Laurent Pautrat
- 2007: "You've Changed" with Tommaso da Prato
- 2007: "First Time I Saw You" with Jazz Voice
- 2007: "Ask Me" with Maurizio Verbeni
- 2007: "Keep On" with House Bros
- 2008: "Never Knew Love" with Frank Savannah
- 2008: "Fascinated" with Mondo
- 2008: "Set Me Free" feat. DJ N Joy
- 2008: "Hit 'N Run Lover" with Didier Vanelli
- 2008: "No More Chances" with Mad'ness & Yuri Presents My Lover
- 2008: "You Are the One" with Stan Courtois
- 2008: "I Don't Wanna Talk About Love"
- 2008: "Are You Man Enough?" (duet with Evelyn Thomas)
- 2009: "I Am What I Am"
- 2009: "Fighting Fire With Fire"
- 2009: "Radio Active Love" (with Paul James)
- 2009: "Let Me Show You" (with Viken Mardikian)
- 2010: "Broken" (written and produced by Jimmy D. Robinson)
- 2011: "No More"
- 2015: "Hold That Sucker Down"
- 2018: "A Deeper Love" Phoenix Lord Feat Carol Jiani
- 2018: "No More" Carol Jiani Feat Edge Produced and Mixed by Seanzbeatz
- 2019: "Who's The Diva" Sanny X feat Carol Jiani with remixes from Paul Sawyer and The Cloudshapers
- 2021: "Fascinated" Phoenix Lord Feat. Carol Jiani
- 2023: "Fascinated" Stardate Feat. Carol Jiani
- 2024: "Loving You" Stardate Feat. Carol Jiani
- 2024: "Get on the Dancefloor" Rogajam Feat. Carol Jiani
- 2024: "Get Ready Be Happy" IsaVis, Nassi, AnAmStyle, Aldo Bergamasco Feat. Carol Jiani
- 2024: "My Story" DiCristino with a remix from Kry (IT)
- 2024: "Free Yourself" Stardate & Nicolas Lacaille Feat. Carol Jiani
- 2024: "Make Me Feel" Stardate Feat. Carol Jiani
- 2024: "You And Me" AnAmStyle Feat. Carol Jiani
