= Moby Dick Records =

Record label

Coordinates: 37°45′38.7″N 122°26′04.7″W

- Founded: 1980
- Founder: Bill Motley; Victor Swedosh
- Defunct: 1984
- Distributor: Self-distributed
- Genre: Dance, Post-disco
- Country of origin: USA
- Location: San Francisco, California

Moby Dick Records was a small disco record label founded by Boys Town Gang producers Bill Motley (DJ Bill Motley) and Victor Swedosh in 1980. Its headquarters were located at 573 Castro Street, San Francisco, California, United States. Swedosh also owned the Moby Dick Bar (opened in 1977) located in the Castro district.

The label was known for "The Moby Dick Sound" and contributing to "Frisco Disco". Its famous acts included Boys Town Gang, Yvonne Elliman, Loverde and Patrick Cowley. Moby Dick also distributed C & M Records, as well as associating with the late night partiers from the Trocadero Transfer, a popular disco nightclub at the time.

“In fact, Moby Dick Records, the owners, they were some of the first to go too, from AIDS. They were a big up-and-coming record label, big competition with us, and they disappeared.”

— John Hedges, of Megatone Records

Moby Dick Records closed in 1984, after seven of its ten core employees died of AIDS.
