= Paul Parker (singer) =

American Hi-NRG and dance singer

- Born: July 2, 1952 (age 74); San Francisco, California
- Genres: Hi-NRG, dance
- Occupation: Singer
- Years active: 1980s-present
- Labels: UTMOSIS, Klone, Fantasia, Megatone, ZYX
- Website: www.paulparkermusic.com

Paul Parker was born on 2 July,1952 in San Francisco, California is an American Hi-NRG and dance singer.

== Career ==
Parker's biggest success came in the 1980s, when he reached No. 1 on the Hot Dance Music/Club Play chart twice. First was "Right on Target" in 1982, written and produced by Patrick Cowley who also produced Parker's 1983 debut album Too Much To Dream. "Shot In the Night" was the second single to be released from the album. Parker also did a cover of Cyndi Lauper's "Time After Time" (1985), and released another single entitled "One Look (One Look Was Enough)" in 1987. He continued in the 1990s with a string of additional dance covers.

In 2007, Parker began a collaboration with UTMOSIS, a San Francisco-based label, producing the worldwide digital single releases "Just Hold On To Love" (2007), "Don't Stop (What You're Doin' To Me)" (2008) and "Chargin' Me Up" (2009).

In 2008, he recorded a duet with the synthpop band Ganymede, "Perfect Target", which appears on the band's LP Operation Ganymede.

Parker's first full-length album of original material in over a decade, Take It From Me, was released January 26, 2010 on the UTMOSIS label.

In 2013, he released an EP titled Superman with Harlem Nights, in classic Patrick Cowley style.

== Discography ==
=== Albums ===
- Too Much to Dream (April 1983)
- Destiny (1995)
- The Collection (1992)
- Take It from Me (2010)
- The Definitive Collection (2013)
- The Man That Fell to Earth (2017)
- Strong: The Album (2025)

== See also ==
- List of number-one dance hits (United States)
- List of artists who reached number one on the US Dance chart
