= Boys Town Gang =

1980–1997 American musical group

- Origin: San Francisco, California, U.S.
- Genres: Post-disco, hi-NRG
- Years active: 1980–1997
- Labels: High Fashion Music; Moby Dick; Fantasy
- Past members: Cynthia Manley (1980-1981); Jackson Moore (1981-1984); Tom Morley (1980-1984); Bruce Carlton (1981-1984)

The Boys Town Gang were a post-disco and hi-NRG band from San Francisco, California. Their popularity peaked in the 1980s when the group reached No. 1 in the Netherlands, Belgium, Spain, and Japan as well as No. 4 in the UK with their cover of "Can't Take My Eyes Off You".

== History ==
In 1980, DJ Bill Motley saw an opportunity to form a disco group that catered to San Francisco's large gay clientele. In his search to form a group, he auditioned hundreds of vocalists, both male and female. Local cabaret singer Cynthia Manley captured the lead spot.

The idea was originally for one 12" single with two tracks of high-energy disco music. Motley, a Diana Ross fan, picked two Ashford & Simpson songs to form a medley for the A-side track. For the B-side track, he wrote a disco drama in four acts. A private record label was founded to release the two songs.

When "Remember Me"/"Ain't No Mountain High Enough" was released, the song took off with Manley's vocals propelling the song to the top of the club charts. The four-act explicit "Cruisin' the Streets" was a snapshot of San Francisco's South of Market District - Ringold Alley at sundown.

Manley departed after the release of these two records, and Jackson Moore took over lead-vocal responsibilities in 1981 for the group's second LP Disc Charge, which contained three pop charting disco cuts: "Can't Take My Eyes Off You" (which was performed on Top of the Pops in 1982), "Signed, Sealed, Delivered (I'm Yours)" and "Come and Get Your Love".

The group's last LP, A Cast of Thousands brought in fellow disco artists such as Debbie Jacobs, Two Tons O' Fun, Sylvester, Margaret Reynolds (KC and the Sunshine Band), and Marlena Shaw. With one more overseas hit, the group disbanded, and Jackson Moore took on a short-lived solo career until the decade came to a close.

== Band members ==
On the records "Remember Me"/"Ain't No Mountain High Enough" and "Cruisin' the Streets", Cynthia Manley provided lead vocals with Robin Charin, Don Wood, Phill Manganello, Tom Morley, and Keith Stewart providing back-up vocals.

From the 1981 album Disc Charge, Jackson Moore was lead singer with Tom Morley and Bruce Carlton as back-up.

== Discography ==
=== Albums ===
- 1981: Cruisin' the Streets
- 1982: Disc Charge
- 1984: A Cast of Thousands

=== Singles ===
Year	Title (A-side / B-side)	Peak chart positions							
Year	Title (A-side / B-side)	AUS	BE (FLA)	GER	IRE	NL 40	NL 100	UK	US Dance
1981	"Remember Me" / "Ain't No Mountain High Enough"	—	17	—	—	7	13	46	5
1981	"Cruisin' the Streets" (US-only release)	—	—	—	—	—	—	—	—
1982	"You're the One" / "Disco Kicks" (US and Canada-only release)	—	—	—	—	—	—	—	6
1982	"Can't Take My Eyes Off You"	21	1	43	5	1	1	4	15
1982	"Signed, Sealed, Delivered (I'm Yours)"	—	7	—	—	8	9	50	15
1982	"Come and Get Your Love"	—	32	—	—	—	37	—	15
1983	"I Just Can't Help Believing"	—	29	—	—	25	22	82	15
1984	"Yester-Me, Yester-You, Yesterday"	—	—	—	—	—	—	—	—
1984	"Brand New Me"	—	—	—	—	—	—	—	—
1984	"Dance Trance Medley"	—	—	—	—	—	—	—	—
1985	"When Will I See You Again"	—	—	—	—	—	—	—	—
1988	"Mega Mix"	—	—	—	—	—	82	—	—
1989	"Wanted for Murder!"	—	—	—	—	—	—	—	—
1996	"Can't Take My Eyes Off You" (1996 remixes)	—	—	—	—	—	—	86	—
1997	"Disco Kicks" (US-only release)	—	—	—	—	—	—	—	45
"—" denotes releases that did not chart or were not released in that territory.

== See also ==
- One-hit wonders in the UK
