= Fusion Records =

Fusion Records B.V.
- Parent company: Freaky Music
- Founder: Coen Noordendorp, Johan van Korven, Raoul van Grinsven, Michel Pollen
- Genre: Hardstyle
- Country of origin: Netherlands
- Official website: Fusion Records Website

Fusion Records is a Dutch sub-label of Freaky Music which, at first, released hard trance and hard house records, and kept growing by releasing hardstyle. After the end of Superplastik (another sub-label of Freaky Music), the artists that were signed to it moved over to Fusion Records. These artists included The Pitcher and Dozer. Fusion stopped pressing vinyl in June 2010 to "enlarge their focus on digital releases".

In November 2010, Noisecontrollers left Fusion to start a new label with Wildstylez.

== Fusion artists ==
=== Current ===
- Avana
- Donkey Rollers
- Faizar
- Inceptum
- Notorious Two
- Omegatypez
- Zany
- Resensed
- Tomsky
- Dark Rehab

=== Former/Inactive ===
- B-Front (Active, now on Roughstate Music)
- Frequencerz (Active, now on Roughstate Music)
- Code Black (Active, now on WE R)
- Focuz (Active, now on WE R)
- Toneshifterz (Active, now on WE R)
- NitrouZ now Outbreak (Active, now on WE R)
- Noisecontrollers (Active, now on Art of Creation)
- Pavo (Inactive, Unknown)
- Southstylers (Inactive project of Zany and Walt)
- Thyron (Parted ways with Fusion Records on 29 January 2015, because of an internal conflict with The Pitcher and B-Front, signed to Gearbox Digital but left the label in 2021 and is now attached to Brennan Hearts I AM HARDSTYLE label since 2021)
- Kyara (Inactive, stopped)
- Walt (Active, as Showtek)
- Feliz (Inactive, works as an attorney at law since 2007)

== See also ==
- List of record labels
