= Patrick Cowley =

American composer and recording artist (1950-1982)

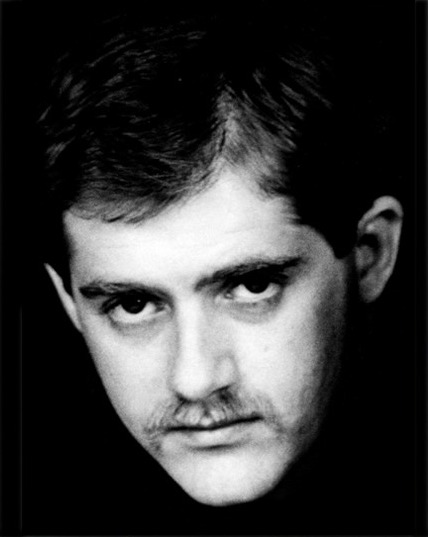
- Cowley in 1982

Background information
- Born: Patrick Joseph Cowley; October 19, 1950; Buffalo, New York, U.S.
- Origin: Buffalo, New York, U.S.
- Died: November 12, 1982 (aged 32) Castro District, San Francisco, California, U.S.
- Genres: Disco; hi-NRG; synth-pop; experimental
- Instruments: Multiple instruments
- Years active: 1973–1982
- Labels: Megatone; Fusion Records; Macro
- Formerly of: Paul Parker; Frank Loverde; Sylvester

Patrick Joseph Cowley (October 19, 1950 – November 12, 1982) was an American disco and hi-NRG dance music composer and recording artist, best known for his collaborations with disco singer Sylvester. Along with Giorgio Moroder, he has been credited as a pioneer of electronic dance music.

== Early life ==
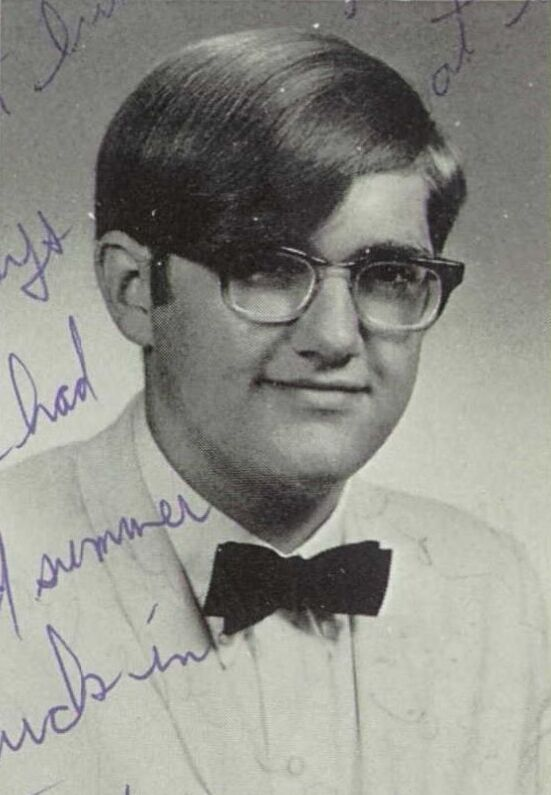
Yearbook photo, 1968

Cowley was born October 19, 1950, in Buffalo, New York, to Ellen and Kenneth Cowley. The family originated in the Horseheads and Corning areas of New York and lived in Rochester. During his teenage years, Cowley became a successful drummer with local amateur bands before attending Niagara University and later the University at Buffalo to study English. In 1971, at the age of 21, Cowley moved to San Francisco to attend the City College of San Francisco (CCSF) where he studied music, specifically the use of synthesizers, from Gerald Mueller.

== Musical career ==
IN 1978, Cowley met San Francisco-based musician Sylvester. Sylvester had asked Cowley to join his studio band after hearing some of his early synthesizer recordings. He played synthesizer on Sylvester's 1978 album Step II which included the hits "You Make Me Feel (Mighty Real)" and "Dance (Disco Heat)". In addition, he wrote "Stars" and "I Need Somebody to Love Tonight" from his 1979 album Stars. Cowley also joined Sylvester's live band and joined him on several world tours.

Cowley's own hits included "Menergy" in 1981, a frank celebration of the gay club scene, and "Megatron Man", which hit No. 1 and No. 2 respectively on the Billboard Hot Dance Music/Club Play chart in 1981. That same year, Patrick Cowley was celebrated at the Menergy parties at The EndUp in San Francisco. Cowley recorded an album at The Stud in San Francisco. He also wrote and produced the dance single "Right on Target" for San Francisco artist Paul Parker, which reached No. 1 on the Billboard dance chart in 1982.

Released in July 1982, "Do Ya Wanna Funk", a collaboration with Sylvester, made No. 4 on the Billboard dance chart that same year. In 1978, Patrick Cowley also produced a 15‑minute, 45‑second remix of Donna Summer's "I Feel Love". Because he didn’t have access to the original multitrack tapes, he built the remix from a standard vinyl copy. The result has since become a sought‑after collector’s item.

The remix later became a staple of the Liverpool underground electronic scene, championed by DJs such as Danny Howells at Aztec club nights, which originated at the Lemon Lounge on Berry Street before expanding into The Masque on Seel Street, promoted by legendary club promoter Lee Omar. Mind Warp, his final album, was composed as he felt the increasing effects of HIV infection, and its songs reflect his increasing detachment from conventional reality as the disease progressed.

== Death ==
During a world tour with Sylvester in late 1981, Cowley complained of feeling increasingly unwell. Upon returning to the United States, he visited a doctor who diagnosed food poisoning. Weeks later, with his condition only worsening, doctors again failed to identify what was wrong with him. At this early stage in the history of HIV/AIDS virus – at the time still referred to as "gay-related immune deficiency" (GRID) by American doctors – misdiagnosis was common.

Cowley, who was gay, was discharged from the hospital in 1982 after doctors could do nothing more for him. Cowley died at his home in the Castro District neighborhood in San Francisco on November 12, 1982. He was 32 years old, an early victim of AIDS.

== Legacy ==
Despite never fully achieving mainstream commercial success, Cowley is regarded as a pioneer of early electronic music and the creator of hi-NRG, an uptempo strain of disco. Various 1980s artists such as Pet Shop Boys and New Order have cited his influence as a producer. Cowley has been described as "a musical pioneer whose achievements rippled throughout queer culture and beyond into the disco mainstream".

Since the 2010s, Cowley's profile has risen as "listeners and scholars excavate disco's intersection with gay liberation."

Amid the accompanying emergence of nu-disco in the late 2000s and early 2010s, profiles of Cowley in Gawker and other high-profile outlets have contributed to a resurgence of interest in his work. 2009 saw the release of Catholic, an album of post-punk-flavored collaborations with writer/singer Jorge Socarras, recorded from 1976 to 1979.

== Discography ==
=== Albums ===
Year	Album name	Artist(s)	Label	Notes
1981	Menergy	Patrick Cowley	Fusion Records	
1981	Megatron Man	Patrick Cowley	Megatone Records	
1982	Mind Warp	Patrick Cowley	Megatone Records	
2009	Catholic	Patrick Cowley, Jorge Socarras	Macro Recordings	Recorded 1976–1979
2013	School Daze	Patrick Cowley	Dark Entries Records	Recorded 1973–1981. School Daze, a collection of electronic instrumentals (influenced by Giorgio Moroder, Isao Tomita, and Wendy Carlos). The album contains several soundtrack cues from the eponymous gay porn film.
2015	Kickin' In	Patrick Cowley	Dark Entries Records	Recorded 1975–1978
2015	Muscle Up	Patrick Cowley	Dark Entries Records	Recorded 1973–1981
2016	Candida Cosmica	Patrick Cowley, Candida Royalle	Dark Entries Records	Recorded 1973–1975. Candida Cosmica an album co-created by Candida Royalle and featured experimental synthesizer music. Candida Cosmica may be a nod to both female sexuality and gay pornography existing within the same sound.
2017	Afternooners	Patrick Cowley	Dark Entries Records	Recorded 1982
2019	Mechanical Fantasy Box	Patrick Cowley	Dark Entries Records	
2020	Some Funkettes	Patrick Cowley	Dark Entries Records	
2022	Malebox	Patrick Cowley	Dark Entries Records	Recorded 1979–1981
2024	From Behind	Patrick Cowley	Dark Entries Records	Recorded 1980–1982
2025	Hard Ware	Patrick Cowley	Dark Entries Records	Recorded 1980–1982

=== Notable collaborations ===
Cowley wrote and produced songs for several San Francisco musicians including friends Paul Parker and Frank Loverde. He was associated with many other musicians such as Kat Mandu, Maurice Tani and Linda Imperial.

- "Right on Target" by Paul Parker (1982)
- "Die Hard Lover" by Frank Loverde (1982)
- "Do You Wanna Funk" by Sylvester (1982)

== See also ==
- List of artists who reached number one on the US Dance chart
