= Megatone Records =

American record label

- Founded: 1981
- Founder: Patrick Cowley; Marty Blecman
- Defunct: 1995
- Status: Back catalog sold to Unidisc Music.
- Distributor: Self-distributed
- Genre: Disco; post-disco; hi-NRG; house
- Country of origin: USA
- Location: San Francisco

Megatone Records was an independent music label specializing in disco and created in San Francisco in 1981 by Patrick Cowley and Marty Blecman. The label name was derived from Cowley's 1981 high energy disco song, "Megatron Man". In 1983, musician Sylvester became a partner of Megatone Records. Some of the artists involved include: Patrick Cowley, Jeanie Tracy, Sylvester, Modern Rocketry, Sarah Dash, Patti LaBelle, and Paul Parker.

== History ==
Megatone owned two sub-labels Megatone House Records and Mega-Tech Records. Megatone House Records, active from 1988 to 1991, specialized in House music. Mega-Tech Records, was active in 1992, specialized in house music with breakbeat.

Megatone brought several high energy disco singles to the U.S. Dance Charts in the early 1980s. All cuts from Sylvester's "All I Need" LP peaked at number 2 on the club charts in 1982, Paul Parker made number 1 with his single "Right On Target" that same year, and Sarah Dash took her single "Lucky Tonight" to the Top 20 with Sylvester and Patti LaBelle on backing vocals.

Musical project Modern Rocketry was also a notable act on the label, combining the flavors of high energy and rock music, they became an underground club success in San Francisco but never charted. Patrick Cowley's Jo-Lo singers did vocal work for this group frequently, but the two women also had a success with the single "Last Call". Jo-Lo member Jo Carol performed in San Francisco past the Megatone records craze, even doing a few shows where she performed several rock classics.

After Cowley's death in 1982, Blecman was head of the label until he died of AIDS in 1991. In 1992, John Hedges and Terrence Brown took over Megatone. In 1995, Megatone closed down & its back catalog was sold to Unidisc Music.

== Notable artists ==
- Sylvester
- Patrick Cowley
- Patti LaBelle
- Paul Parker
- Jeanie Tracy
- Sarah Dash
- Queen Samantha
- Billy Preston
- Jane Fonda

== See also ==
- Moby Dick Records
