= Hi-NRG =

Genre of uptempo disco or electronic dance music

- Stylistic origins: Electronic; disco
- Cultural origins: The late 1970s and the early 1980s in the United Kingdom and the United States
- Typical instruments: Synthesizer; drum machine; electronic keyboards; music sequencer; electronic drums
- Derivative forms: Eurobeat; Eurodance; Italo disco; techno; hard house; trance; hard NRG; new beat

Regional scenes
- London; Montreal; New York; San Francisco

Other topics
- List of artists and songs

Hi-NRG (pronounced "high energy") is a genre of uptempo disco or electronic dance music that originated during the late 1970s and early 1980s.

As a music genre, typified by its fast tempo, staccato hi-hat rhythms (and the four-on-the-floor pattern), reverberated "intense" vocals and "pulsating" octave basslines, it was particularly influential on the disco scene.

== Characteristics ==
Whether hi-NRG is more rock-oriented than standard disco music is a matter of opinion. Hi-NRG can be heavily synthesized but it is not a prerequisite, and whether it is devoid of "funkiness" differs among the opinions of listeners. Many artists perform their vocals in R&B and soul styles on hi-NRG tracks. The genre's tempo ranges between 120 and 140 beats per minute. Lyrics tend to be overtly camp, kitschy, tongue-in-cheek, sexually suggestive with double entendres but also occasionally sentimental or maudlin.

The sound of high energy dance tracks, particularly electronic dance or disco, is immediately identifiable by its iconic basslines, pioneered by producer Giorgio Moroder, often programmed in repeating bass sequences, particularly 16th notes, which is characteristic of the hi-NRG electronic dance sound as in "I Feel Love" performed by Donna Summer and produced by Moroder. The rhythm is characterized by an energetic, staccato, sequenced synthesizer sound of octave basslines or/and where the bass often takes the place of the hi-hat, alternating a more resonant note with a dampened note to signify the tempo of the record. There is also often heavy use of the clap sound found on drum machines.

One form of hi-NRG, as performed by Megatone Records artists and Ian Levine, is any uptempo disco and dance music, whether containing octave basslines or not, that often features covers of "classic" Motown hits (Boys Town Gang) and torch songs, and is often "theatrical" in performance, featuring female (and male) musicians with facetious diva personas and male musicians sometimes in "drag" (Sylvester, Divine), cabarets/musical theater (Vicki Sue Robinson, Sharon Redd). This style, that Stock Aitken Waterman were influenced by, had a large cult following among gay club-goers in the 1980s, especially San Franciscan black and white gay men.

A second form, a precursor of Italian/Japanese "Eurobeat", with influences of techno and early Chicago house, primarily focuses on its characteristic sequenced "octave-jumping basslines" above anything else and in this form hi-NRG managed to surge into the mainstream with Stacey Q, Kim Wilde, and Laura Branigan. The octave basslines are also found in electroclash and in both cases may be traced to synth-pop and even further back to Giorgio Moroder ("I Feel Love").

== Terminology ==
Donna Summer was interviewed about her single "I Feel Love", which was a mostly electronic, relatively high-tempo Euro disco song without a strong funk component. In the interview, she said "this song became a hit because it has a high-energy vibe". Following that interview, the description "high-energy" was increasingly applied to high-tempo disco music, especially songs dominated by electronic timbres. The tempo threshold for high-energy disco was around 130 to 140 BPM. In the 1980s, the term "high-energy" was stylized as "hi-NRG". Eurobeat, dance-pop and freestyle artists such as Shannon, Stock Aitken & Waterman, Taylor Dayne, Freeez and Michael Sembello were also labeled as "hi-NRG" when sold in the United States.

In the 1980s, "hi-NRG" referred not just to any high-tempo disco/dance music, but to a specific genre, only somewhat disco-like.

Ian Levine, a hi-NRG DJ, the in-house DJ at London's Heaven nightclub in its early years and later a record producer, defines hi-NRG as "melodic, straightforward dance music that's not too funky." Music journalist Simon Reynolds adds "The nonfunkiness was crucial. Slamming rather than swinging, hi-NRG's white European feel was accentuated by butt-bumping bass twangs at the end of each bar."

== History ==
High-tempo disco music dates back to the mid-1970s. The first hi-NRG song was Donna Summer's "I Feel Love" from 1977. Other early examples include several British disco songs by Biddu and Patrick Hernandez ("Born to Be Alive") in 1979.

In the early 1980s, high energy music found moderate mainstream popularity in Europe; while opposing both Euro disco and electro on the dance scene, it became mainstream in the gay community in the United States. Hi-NRG was reliant on technology and was all about "unfeasibly athletic dancing, bionic sex, and superhuman stamina". The freedom associated with it seemed to be embodied by a literal escape from human embodiment, and synchrony with technology. However, this was generally limited to the bodies of men as evidenced by songs titled "Menergy", and "So Many Men, So Little Time". Producers such as Bobby Orlando and Patrick Cowley created "an aural fantasy of a futuristic club populated entirely by Tom of Finland studs."

During the same period, a genre of music styled as "hi-NRG" (EDM) became popular in Canada and the UK. The most popular groups of this style are Trans-X and Lime. The genre is also closely related to space disco; bands of this genre include Koto, Laserdance, and Cerrone. The hi-NRG sound also influenced techno and house music.

=== Commercial success ===
In 1983 in the UK, music magazine Record Mirror began publishing a weekly hi-NRG chart. The style entered the British mainstream, with hits on the UK pop and dance charts (followed by the US dance charts), such as Hazell Dean's "Searchin' (I Gotta Find a Man)" and Evelyn Thomas's "High Energy".

In the mid-1980s, hi-NRG producers in the dance and pop charts included Ian Levine and Stock Aitken Waterman, both of whom worked with many different artists. Stock Aitken Waterman had two of the most successful hi-NRG singles ever with their productions of Dead or Alive's "You Spin Me Round (Like a Record)" (UK #1, CAN #1, US #11 in 1985) and Bananarama's "Venus" (US #1, CAN #1, UK #8 in 1986). They also brought the genre full-circle, in a sense, by writing and producing Donna Summer's 1989 hit "This Time I Know It's for Real" (UK #3, CAN #7, US #7).

American music magazine Dance Music Report published hi-NRG charts (and related industry news) in the mid- to late 1980s, as the genre reached its peak. By 1990, however, techno and rave music had superseded hi-NRG in popularity in many dance clubs. Despite this, hi-NRG music is still being produced and played in various forms, including many remixed versions of mainstream pop hits, some with re-recorded vocals. Later in the 1990s, nu-NRG music, a form of trance music evolved from hi-NRG, was born.
