= DJ Earworm =

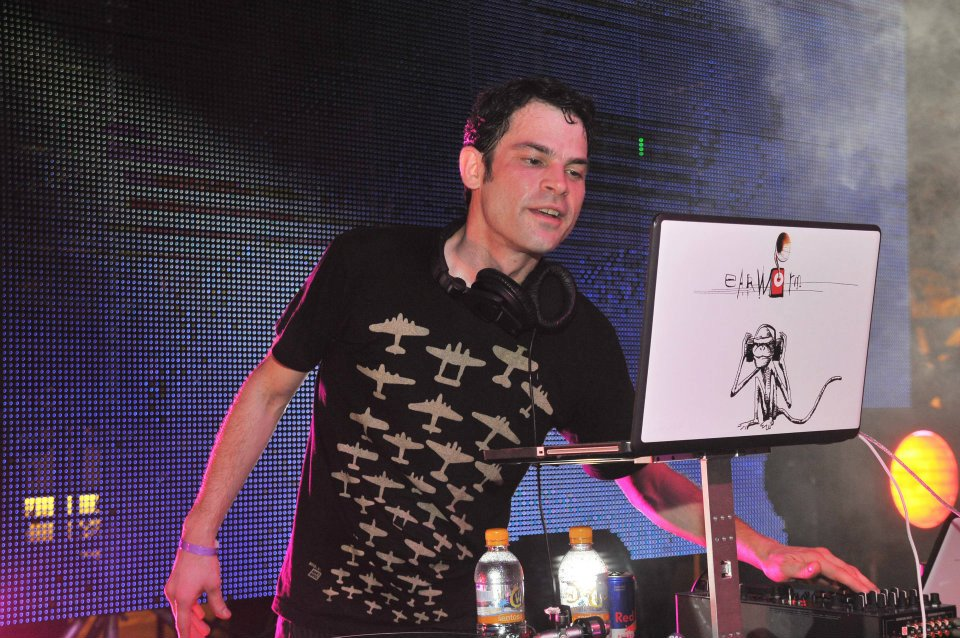
- DJ Earworm at the NYE Siloso Beach Party, Sentosa, Singapore, 2009

Background information
- Also known as: DJ Earworm
- Born: Jordan Roseman; San Francisco, CA
- Genre: Mashup
- Occupations: DJ, producer
- Years active: 2007–present
- Website: djearworm.com

Jordan Roseman, known professionally as DJ Earworm, is an American mashup artist from San Francisco, California, who has achieved recognition for his technically sophisticated, songwriting-oriented music and video mashups. His annual “United State of Pop” mashup features the top 25 songs of the year, based in part on the Billboard's Year-End Hot 100 chart, in one mix.

== Biography ==
Roseman was born into a big family of musicians and raised in eastern Iowa and Evanston, Illinois. At the University of Illinois, Roseman started as a physics major, before changing to music theory and computer science.

Roseman started creating mashups in 2003, which he said "was a relatively unexplored art form," with most people doing "A vs. B mashups [that featured] an a cappella of one song and an instrumental of another." He began by using ACID Pro, and after showing them to DJ Adrian at Club Bootie and receiving encouragement from him, Roseman created the moniker DJ Earworm ("earworm" referencing a song that repeats uncontrollably in one's mind) and began releasing his mashups online.

DJ Earworm's style involves gradually layering song samples over each other, which adds texture and builds momentum as a song progresses. In 2006, he published Audio Mashup Construction Kit, a how-to manual for creating mashups. Earworm uses Ableton Live and Adobe Audition to create his mashups and also DJs live with Ableton. For the videos that accompany his mashups, he uses Final Cut Pro X. In 2010, Earworm started VJing in his live sets.

Earworm's "United State of Pop" videos from 2008, 2009 and 2010 were featured in a FACT exhibit titled The Art of Pop Video, that ran from March–May 2013.

== "United State of Pop" series ==
When creating the yearly mix, Earworm tries to find the top 25 songs from that year that represent the feeling of the year that he will use for the main track(s) in the song. He also takes into consideration if the songs he uses are "mixable" and are able to be transposed without taking away from their original sound, to determine the amount of each he uses. Finally, he looks for an instrumental of a song to drive the mashup. To isolate each song for use in the mashup, Earworm looks for unmixed files from the studio on the internet or through connections. If those files are unavailable, he will process the full song with Adobe Audition or Prosoniq sonicWORX Isolate to isolate the vocals.

Earworm's 2007 mashup, "United State of Pop", consisted of the top 25 songs of 2007 according to Billboard. The song was based on the beat from "Umbrella", while using hooks from Fergie's two songs "Glamorous" and "Fergalicious". On December 25, 2008, DJ Earworm released his mix for the year, "Viva la Pop", prominently featuring Coldplay's song "Viva la Vida" as the backing track. The mashup peaked at number 70 on Billboard's now defunct Pop 100 Airplay chart.

DJ Earworm continued to release his yearly mashup, "Blame It on the Pop" in 2009, "Don't Stop the Pop" in 2010, "World Go Boom" in 2011. The sixth year-end mashup, titled "Shine Brighter", was released on December 18, 2012. The mashup was finished on December 15, 2012 and premiered on Virgin Radio in Canada. It is the second mashup not to follow the year-end chart, due to the fact that Rihanna's "We Found Love" and LMFAO's "Sexy and I Know It" both appeared on the chart, and they were both featured in last year's mashup. It used a combination of Kesha's "Die Young", Ellie Goulding's "Lights" and some whistles of Flo Rida's "Whistle" as the backing track.

The seventh year-end mashup, titled "Living the Fantasy", was released on December 3, 2013. Earworm stated that this mix is "a little darker-themed" and considered making the mix a "no-frills ballad". He added that "The ballads seem to be a lot more present than they have been in many years, and the dance music is having less strong of a pull. And even the dance music that is there is more gentle, like [Robin Thicke's] "Blurred Lines" and [Daft Punk's] "Get Lucky", and not EDM bangers."

On December 3, 2014, Earworm released 2014's mix, "Do What You Wanna Do". He said, "The thing that has been most notable in the past two or three years is the decline of EDM. The "United State of Pop" became this dance track from '09 to '12, and then starting last year, there just wasn't enough in that genre to fully support it, so I went down-tempo. And this year, "Timber", which was popular in January, is the only popular dance track I'm dealing with. It's definitely down-tempo, so you have to decide, how is this going to go? How am I going to maintain the energy levels while being true to the sound of the year?" The instrumentals for the track were composed of the drums from Jessie J's "Bang Bang", the percussion of DJ Snake and Lil Jon's "Turn Down for What", the horns from Jason Derulo's "Talk Dirty" and the piano hooks from A Great Big World's "Say Something". Earworm explained, "I would love the whole thing to be perfectly blended each time, but it also has to be digestible. Some years, it's a pretty straightforward instrumental from one source, but this year is the most blended instrumental I've been able to achieve yet."

The ninth year-end mashup, titled "50 Shades of Pop", was released on December 2, 2015. For this release, Earworm used the top 50 songs of 2015 instead of the top 25 as in years past. Earworm felt that the mashup was "a more eclectic mix than it was five years ago", adding that "Music has been going through a softer phase than it was a few years ago so there's that return of adult contemporary" highlighted by "And then there's sort of retro, uptempo dance stuff" as seen with Ellie Goulding's "Love Me Like You Do". "And then there's sort of retro, uptempo dance stuff" represented by The Weeknd. Upon its release, the mash-up hit number four on the Billboard + Twitter Trending 140 chart. 2016 saw the release of the tenth mashup, "Into Pieces". Earworm once again used 25 songs for the mix, which featured Calvin Harris and Rihanna's "This Is What You Came For" as the foundation for the mashup.

"How We Do"—Earworm's tenth mashup in the United State of Pop series, for 2017—once again featured a mash-up of 25 songs from the year, with "Despacito" serving as the basis of the track. In 2018, he released "Turnin' it Up", featuring a mashup of 25 songs, including Dua Lipa's "New Rules", Ariana Grande's "No Tears Left to Cry", Camila Cabello's "Never Be the Same", and more. In 2019, "Run Away" became Earworm's twelfth mashup in his United State of Pop series, with Panic! at the Disco's "High Hopes", Benny Blanco, Halsey and Khalid's "Eastside" and Lizzo's "Good as Hell" featured among the 25 songs. In 2020, Earworm's United State of Pop came back with "Something to Believe In", with The Weeknd's "Blinding Lights" as the basis of the track, alongside 24 other songs. In 2021, "Strawberry Ice Cream" was released, with Olivia Rodrigo's Deja Vu as the basis of the track, with 24 other songs also included. In 2022, "I Want Music" was released, again featuring 25 hits, with multiple songs by Bad Bunny and Harry Styles making the mix.

== "SummerMash" series ==
In July 2013, DJ Earworm released "SummerMash '13" featuring a mashup of popular songs from mid-2013 that embody "the spirit of summer 2013". Earworm released another summer mix in August 2014, "SummerMash '14". The mashup uses the synths from Calvin Harris' "Summer" as the main beat, and verses from Maroon 5's "Maps", 5 Seconds of Summer's "She Looks So Perfect", and Magic!'s "Rude". Earworm returned for his third "SummerMash" in 2015, with tracks like Taylor Swift's "Bad Blood", Maroon 5's "This Summer" and Wiz Khalifa and Charlie Puth's "See You Again" (soundtrack to the 2015 film Fast & Furious 7) featured in the mashup. In 2016, "SummerMash '16" became Earworm's fourth project in this series, with Justin Timberlake's "Can't Stop the Feeling!" (soundtrack to the 2016 film Trolls) used as the sound of the mashup, with songs like Mike Posner's "I Took a Pill in Ibiza" and Drake's "One Dance" featuring in the mashup. In 2017, Earworm released his fifth and final "Summermash" before its two-year hiatus with French Montana and Swae Lee's "Unforgettable" as the soundtrack before returning in 2020 with his sixth "SummerMash 2020".

== Official mashups ==
In December 2013, Earworm created the music used in the 2013 YouTube Rewind video. He returned again for the 2014 edition. In May 2014, Earworm released "Mash Up for What" featuring Jason Derulo's "Talk Dirty", Pharrell Williams's "Happy", and DJ Snake and Lil Jon's "Turn Down for What". Also in May 2014, in conjunction with an American Heart Association's CPR campaign, Earworm released "Hands-Only CPR Mash-up", designed to run at 100 beats per minute, the rate at which chest compressions in hands–only CPR should be performed.

== Collaborations ==
In 2010, Earworm created a mashup based on Enrique Iglesias's hit, “I Like It”, for the Champions League Twenty20 showpiece event. Earworm was asked again to make another mashup in 2012.
