= The Beastles =

Fictional band created by dj BC

The Beastles is the name of a fictional band created by dj BC. The music is a mashup of music from the Beatles and Beastie Boys.

dj BC received both acclaim and controversy after the release of the self-made album 2004 dj BC presents The Beastles, which was removed at the request of Apple Corps, the owner of all The Beatles' intellectual property, including their recordings. In 2006 he went on to produce a second album named Let It Beast, with cover art by cartoonist Josh Neufeld.

== Critical attention ==
The Boston Phoenix named dj BC as Boston's Best Lawbreaker, the Detroit Metro Times marked dj BC presents The Beastles as one of the best of 2004, and dj BC was featured in Newsweek, and Rolling Stone.

== Discography ==
=== "2 Many Beastles" (single, 2009) ===
  - Samples:
    - "Taxman" by The Beatles
    - "Too Many Rappers" by Beastie Boys

=== dj BC presents The Beastles (2004) ===
dj BC presents The Beastles

1. "Whatcha Want, Lady?" – 3:49
  - Samples:
    - "Lady Madonna" by The Beatles
    - "So What'cha Want" by Beastie Boys
2. "Tripper Trouble" – 3:01
  - Samples:
    - "Day Tripper" by Beatles
    - "Triple Trouble" by Beastie Boys
    - "Three Is a Magic Number" from Schoolhouse Rock
3. "Mother Nature's Rump" – 3:34
  - Samples:
    - "Mother Nature's Son" by The Beatles
    - "Shake Your Rump" by Beastie Boys
4. "I Feel Fine Right Now" – 3:02
  - Samples:
    - "I Feel Fine" by The Beatles
    - "Right Right Now Now" by Beastie Boys
5. "Sure-Bla-Di Shot-Bla-Da" – 3:23
  - Samples:
    - "Ob-La-Di, Ob-La-Da" by The Beatles
    - "Sure Shot" by Beastie Boys
6. "Mad World Forever" – 3:24
  - Samples:
    - "Strawberry Fields Forever" by The Beatles
    - "In A World Gone Mad" by Beastie Boys
7. "Word To The Mic" – 3:08
  - Samples:
    - "The Word" by The Beatles
    - "Pass the Mic" by Beastie Boys
8. "Root Down Reprise" – 2:46
  - Samples:
    - "Sgt. Pepper's Lonely Hearts Club Band (Reprise)" by The Beatles
    - "Root Down" by Beastie Boys
9. "Hold It Together Now" – 4:43
  - Samples:
    - "Come Together" by The Beatles
    - "Hold It Now, Hit It" by Beastie Boys

=== Let It Beast (2006) ===
Let It Beast, cover art by Josh Neufeld.

1. "Ladies Do Love Me" – 3:34
  - Samples:
    - "Love Me Do" by The Beatles
    - "Hey Ladies" by Beastie Boys
2. "Belly Movin'" – 3:12
  - Samples:
    - "The Inner Light" by The Beatles
    - "Body Movin'" by Beastie Boys
3. "Building My Life" – 2:38
  - Samples:
    - "In My Life" by The Beatles
    - "It Takes Time To Build" by Beastie Boys
4. "Electrified Kite" – 2:01
  - Samples:
    - "Being For The Benefit Of Mr. Kite!" by The Beatles
    - "Electrify" by Beastie Boys
5. "Let it Beast" – 3:24
  - Samples:
    - "Let It Be" by The Beatles
    - "The Negotiation Limerick File" by Beastie Boys
6. "Lovely NYC" – 3:12
  - Samples:
    - "Lovely Rita" by The Beatles
    - "Yellow Submarine" by The Beatles
    - "An Open Letter To NYC" by Beastie Boys
7. "Anna's MCs" – 3:54
  - Samples:
    - "Anna (Go to Him)" by The Beatles
    - "Crawlspace" by Beastie Boys
8. "Love You To Check It Out" – 3:46
  - Samples:
    - "Love You To" by The Beatles
    - "Ch-Check It Out" by Beastie Boys
9. "Looking Down The Barrel Of A Warm Gun" – 2:41
  - Samples:
    - "Happiness Is a Warm Gun" by The Beatles
    - "Looking Down the Barrel of a Gun" by Beastie Boys
10. "A Day in The Life of A Beastie Boy" – 2:20
  - Samples:
    - "A Day in the Life" by The Beatles
    - "Get Back" by The Beatles
    - "Groove Holmes" by Beastie Boys
    - "Mark On The Bus" by Beastie Boys

=== Ill Submarine (2013) ===
1. "No Sleep Till the Sun Comes Up"
2. "Move Prudence"
3. "Ill Submarine"
4. "Drive My Car, Thief!"
5. "OK Nowhere Man"
6. "Do You Know an Intergalactic Secret?"
7. "The Michelle Diamond Brouhaha"
8. "Can't Buy Me Rhymes"
9. "Hello FU Goodbye"
10. "Brrthday"
11. "Beastles Flying in The Cut"
12. "Twist That Train"
13. "Hide a Little Something Away"
14. "Crazy-Ass Revolution"
15. "Mean Old Men"
16. "Say It, Martha"
17. "Glasses From The Night Before"
18. "Get It All Together Now"
19. "Party Lane Shazam"
20. "Don't Let MCA Down"
21. "I Wanna Sabotage Your Hand"
22. "(You Gotta) Fight Eleanor Rigby (And The Walrus)

== See also ==
- The Grey Album
