= I-Beam (nightclub) =

Nightclub in San Francisco, California, US

- Interactive map of I-Beam
- Location: 1748 Haight Street, San Francisco, California
- Coordinates: 37°46′10″N 122°27′4″W
- Owner: Sanford Kellman

Construction
- Opened: October 20, 1977
- Closed: July 23, 1994

The I-Beam was a former popular nightclub and live music venue active from 1977 to 1994, and located in the Park Masonic Hall building on the second floor at 1748 Haight Street in the Haight-Ashbury neighborhood of San Francisco. The I-Beam served as one of San Francisco's earliest disco clubs, as well as serving as a "gay refuge".

== History ==
Before opening the club, Sanford Kellman had an impromptu party there and found that all the neighbors complained about the noise. Therefore, Sanford Kellman was required by the city government of San Francisco to soundproof the entire building at great expense, delaying the opening of the club for several months.

The I-Beam began as a seven-night-a-week club, opening on October 20, 1977. On the opening night of the club, groups of bare-chested men in jeans and construction hats carried I-Beams on their shoulders into the club. It originated as a gay disco run by Sanford Kellman, a former astronomer. The club was named after Sanford Kellman's dog, "Beamer". Throughout the 1980s, the club served as a top outlet in the city for "imported modern rock".

As the crowd left the I-Beam for the newer clubs South of Market such as the Trocadero Transfer and later on Dreamland, the I-Beam opened only for five days a week. Later in their history, on Friday and Saturday nights at the I-Beam hosted heterosexual dance parties.

=== Dance club ===
The club hosted I-Beam Sunday Night Tea Dances, which took place from 6 p.m. to 2 a.m. on Sunday night. Free passes to this popular tea dance were routinely handed out in San Francisco. Michael Garrett was the first DJ to play there when it opened in 1977, immediately after which Tim Rivers was hired and played Wednesday, Thursday, and Saturday nights. Eventually, a Sunday Tea Dance was added and Tim played the opening hours, 4 pm to 8 pm, after which Steve Fabus took over the 'tables. Steve played at the Sunday Night Tea Dance from 1977 to 1980. From 1980 to its end in 1992, Michael Garrett was the primary DJ—he played modern rock dance music by artists such as Madonna, Prince, New Order, The Cure, R.E.M., U2, Nine Inch Nails, Duran Duran, Depeche Mode, etc. Guest DJs included Micheal Dianella and Jim Caldwell frequently creating original remixes.

The Boy Club continued until the end of 1988. Beginning in 1988, there was a hip-hop dance club. In 1989, the year rave dances first started in San Francisco, Wednesday night became, Acid House Night at the I-Beam.

Monday nights became known as Monday Night Live! started by Randall Schiller and was originally booked by Alan Robinson and then Randy persuaded his employee Cathy Cohn to take over the booking, a KUSF DJ. After Cathy and Randy left, the booking duties for the club were handled by Anita Rivas, and eventually Eddie Jennings. Randall Schiller installed the latest EAW Loudspeaker system in the I-Beam as he was the first to introduce EAW to the Bay Area as a long time dealer for the product.

The Sunday Night Tea Dance continued until July 1992, but the last year had few patrons because by that time house music had become more popular than modern rock among gays who liked to go dancing.

=== Live music ===
Randy Schiller, who built the new sound system for the club, was operating a recording studio. He had a long list of bands recording in his studio and decided to reopen on Monday nights, which started "Monday Night Live" with local bands. Live music performers at the I-Beam included Siouxsie and the Banshees, the Pixies, Pearl Jam, U2, Duran Duran, Jesus and Mary Chain, Red Hot Chili Peppers, 10,000 Maniacs, Jane's Addiction, Arthur Lee, Ruin, and Run-DMC.

New Music Night was instituted on Monday nights starting on July 28, 1980 with The Lloyds and Ultrasheen, and later Tuesday nights emerging new rock music groups played. Following the 1989 Loma Prieta earthquake, The Fillmore Auditorium experienced a temporary closure and the I-Beam was able to book many bands that would otherwise have played the larger venue. Because of this the club was featuring live music up to four nights a week, usually Monday, Wednesday, Friday and Saturday, with the occasional Sunday afternoon 'matinée' performance (a legendary Butthole Surfers show, among others). On Monday, November 14, 1988, The Escape Club performed, marking the only time a band with the current number one record on the Billboard Hot 100 chart ('Wild, Wild West', week of Nov. 12, 1988) played at the club.

=== Interior decor ===
Inside the I-Beam, the main room was forty feet by sixty feet. There were Mylar covered cardboard I-Beams hanging from the ceiling above the center of the dance floor. At the entrance there were framed pictures of various astronomical objects such as galaxies and planets put there by Kellman. Randall Schiller installed an award-winning sound system including lighting and, later, video. There was a large room in the front near the entrance with pinball machines and pool tables. In January 1988, three go-go dancing boxes were installed.

== Closure and legacy ==
New Wave City, a San Francisco DJ event producer, presented its, "Just Can't Get Enough" event at the I-Beam on the last night of the I-Beam's operation, July 23, 1994. The I-Beam closed in 1994 after a long battle with neighbors over sound issues. The live music shows over the last few years were few and far between.

After the I-Beam closed, the building (originally the Park Masonic Hall building), remained vacant and boarded up for 10 years until 2004. It was torn down and a modern apartment house with retail shops at street level was constructed on the site.

In 2017, DJ Jim Hopkins and the San Francisco Disco Preservation Society was worked on online archiving club music mixes of the 1980s and 1990s from the I-Beam, as well as Pleasuredome, and The EndUp.
