= Bootie (club night) =

Coordinates: 37°46′16″N 122°24′46″W

Bootie is the first club night in the United States dedicated solely to mashups and bootlegs, and was founded in San Francisco, California. It is now the biggest and longest running all-mashup party in the world, with regular parties in several cities.

== History ==
The original party began at the Cherry Bar (later known as Codeword) in San Francisco in August 2003, and moved to DNA Lounge in March 2006, where it now occurs every Saturday and is simulcast into the virtual venue The Level in Second Life. For over a year, it was the only club of its kind in America, and its creators, DJs Adrian & the Mysterious D (aka A Plus D), along with former resident DJ Party Ben, were instrumental in helping to popularize mashup culture on the West Coast. The club has showcased mashup DJs from around the world, including DJ Earworm, DJ Lobsterdust, DJs from Mars, ShyBoy, Go Home Productions, Evolution Control Committee, and dj BC, as well as featuring a live house band, Smash-Up Derby, known as "the world's first mashup rock band."

Bootie SF has been regularly named "Best Dance Club" in the SF Weekly's "Best of SF". The Bay Guardian's annual "Best of the Bay" has awarded Bootie for "Best Theme Club Night/Best Dance Party and Best Event Producers" for several years. Best of the Bay Issue Hallmarks of the event include the Midnight Mashup Show, which often consists of aerial act performers or drag queens, as well as a regular 11 PM show, which rotates throughout the month between live mashup rock band Smash-Up Derby, burlesque show Hubba Hubba Revue, and drag revue The Monster Show. After the shows, the crowd is thrown a limited number of Bootie CDs, which many club patrons collect. The night has been written about in national magazines such as Spin, Complex, and Club Systems International.

In July 2005, A Plus D launched a sister club in Los Angeles called Bootie LA, which began at The Echo in Echo Park and is now held at the adjacent Echoplex. In February 2007, the promoters launched Bootie NYC in New York City. That same month, they partnered with French DJ ComaR to help launch Bootie Paris, which ran for nearly three years at La Mechanique Ondulatoire. Bootie Munich, with resident DJs BootOX and Schmolli, was launched in October 2007. Bootie Boston, with dj BC and Lenlow, was launched in March 2008. Bootie Berlin launched in June 2009 with residents DJ Morgoth, Mashup-Germany, and Dr. Waumiau. Bootie Rio in Brazil was launched in May 2010. Bootie ATL, in Atlanta with dj BC, was launched in August 2011.

A Plus D have also done one-off Bootie parties in many other places around the globe, including Hong Kong, Beijing, Singapore, London, Vienna, Brazil, Brisbane, Chicago, Portland, Seattle, Mexico City, Copenhagen, Helsinki, Hamburg, Lithuania, Ireland, and Salt Lake City.

While the number of CDs given away at each party is limited, the "Bootie Top 10," list of for each month is available on their website and can be downloaded for free as MP3 files. The selection is curated by A Plus D, who also produce the annual "Best of Bootie" collection, a much-anticipated annual compilation for mashup fans and those attending the New Year's Eve party, also available as free downloads, both as a continuous mix and individual tracks.
