= A+D =

A+D may refer to:

- Adrian & the Mysterious D
- Architecture and Design Museum, Los Angeles

== See also ==
- A&D (disambiguation)
