= A&D =

A&D may refer to:

- Akrotiri and Dhekelia, two UK-administered areas on the island of Cyprus that comprise the Sovereign Base Areas military bases of the UK
- A&D Company, Limited, a Japanese manufacturer of medical equipment and laboratory testing equipment; it refers to "analog and digital"
- Angels & Demons, a book by American author Dan Brown
- Aerospace & Defense, the defense industry

== See also ==
- A+D (disambiguation)
