= DJ BC =

- Born: Bob Cronin
- Origin: Boston, Massachusetts, U.S.
- Genres: Hip hop
- Occupations: Remixer, record producer, DJ
- Years active: 1996–present
- Labels: Fork In Hand Records; Springman Records

Bob Cronin, better known by the stage name DJ BC, is an American disc jockey and mashup producer.

BC's work has been heard from the radio stations in Boston and New York City to stations in Paris and Athens. He founded a mash-up night in Boston, known as Mash Ave, in 2004, and founded the popular Bootie Boston in 2007. He now serves as a resident DJ at the mash-up night Bootie ATL in Atlanta.

dj BC received both acclaim and controversy after his release of The Beastles in 2004, a mash up of music from The Beatles and the Beastie Boys. The music was quickly removed at the request of Apple Records, the owner of all Beatles intellectual property, including their songs. As a result of the release, the Boston Phoenix marked him as Boston's Best Lawbreaker, the Detroit Metro Times marked his CD one of the best of 2004, and he was featured in Newsweek, and Rolling Stone. He later released Let It Beast in 2006 and the double-album Ill Submarine in 2013. Some tracks from the first Beastles album, along with other dj BC mashups and Beastie Boys bootlegs, were included on a rare 2-Part limited vinyl release by the Japanese record label Hotshot Records.

dj BC's follow-up project was Glassbreaks, a ten-song album combining the music of Philip Glass with additional beats, production, and raps from such artists as The Fugees, Lil Jon, Q-Tip and Kanye West. Glassbreaks is also no longer available.

On the first anniversary of Hurricane Katrina, dj BC released Wu Orleans, an album combining the music of New Orleans with the music of Wu-Tang Clan. The album was named a top download in Spin magazine, and was later released on vinyl.

dj BC released an official remix album for the band Big D and the Kids Table in Spring 2008 with the album title Strictly Mixed and Mashed, and he appeared on the band's 2009 record Fluent In Stroll as well as their Wicked Hardcore Christmas EP. The video for dj BC's production Wicked Hip-Hop Christmas, with rapper Black ELement, has circulated widely online.

In 2011, dj BC released the 12-track album Another Jay on Earth, featuring remixes of Jay-Z vs. Brian Eno. The source material includes Jay-Z's American Gangster album, Brian Eno's Another Day on Earth album, Eno's song "Another Green World" as well as interviews and spoken word clips, additional sound effects, beats and scratches.

BC has also remixed songs for official releases by bands such as Heaven 17, Sonic Boom Six and The A.K.A.'s. He was named Outstanding DJ/Dance Act of 2007 in the Boston Music Awards.
