= Trocadero =

Trocadero may refer to:

- Battle of Trocadero, an 1823 battle in southern Spain between the French army and Spanish revolutionaries
- Trocadéro, Paris, an area of Paris, France
  - Jardins du Trocadéro
- Palais du Trocadéro, built for the 1878 World's Fair in Paris, France
- Trocadero, Birmingham, a pub in England
- Trocadero (Los Angeles), a 1930s ballroom and a modern nightclub in California, U.S.
- Trocadero, Newtown, a heritage-listed former dance hall in Sydney, New South Wales, Australia
- Trocadero, San Francisco, a roadhouse in California, U.S.
- London Trocadero, an 1896 restaurant, now a shopping complex
- Sydney Trocadero, a dance and concert hall opened in 1936 in New South Wales, Australia
- Trocadero Ballroom (1917–1975), at Elitch Gardens, Denver, Colorado, U.S.
- Trocadero Hotel (Bangkok), a former hotel on Surawong Road in Bangkok
- Trocadero Theatre, a historic theater in Philadelphia, Pennsylvania, U.S.
- Trocadero Transfer, a former nightclub in San Francisco

== Arts and entertainment ==
- Trocadero (1944 film), an American film
- Trocadero (band), an American alternative rock band
- Trocadero, part of the film series Paris Exposition, 1900
- Trocadero, an album; and "Trocadero", a song, by the British rock and roll band Showaddywaddy

== Other uses ==
- Trocadero (drink), a soft drink popular in Sweden
- Trocadéro station, on the Paris Metro, France
- French ship Trocadéro (1824), a ship of the line
- Isla del Trocadero, the site of the 1823 battle

== See also ==
- Les Ballets Trockadero de Monte Carlo, an American all-male drag ballet company
