= The EndUp =

Nightclub in San Francisco, United States

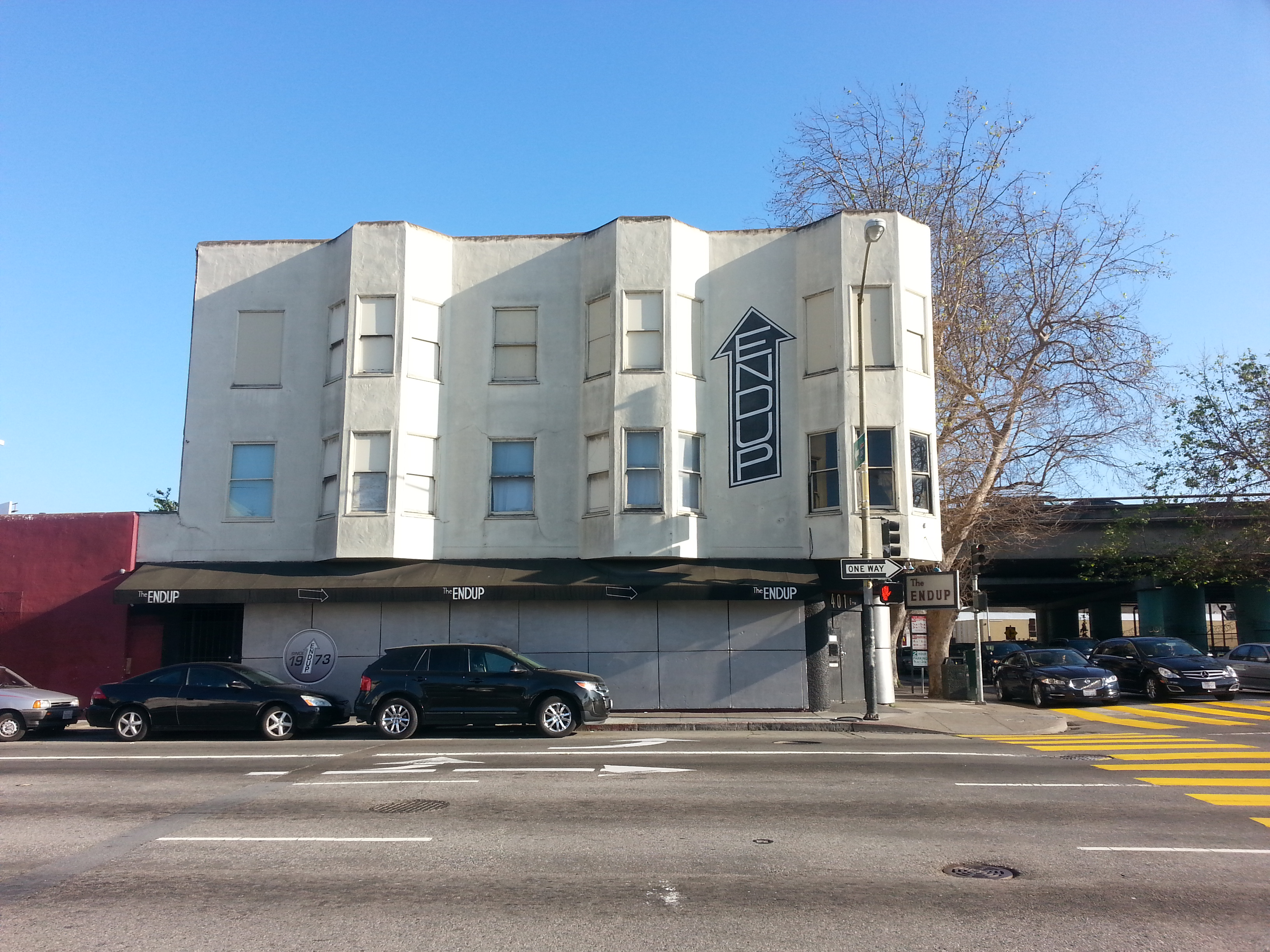
- The EndUp as seen from Harrison Street

- The EndUp's location within San Francisco
- Full name: The EndUp
- Address: 401 6th Street
- Location: San Francisco, California, US
- Coordinates: 37°46′38.2″N 122°24′13.6″W
- Owner: Jook House Entertainment, LLC
- Capacity: 100
- Type: Nightclub • Afterhours club
- Public transit: MUNI Bus: 8, 12, 27, 47; Powell St. BART Station; 4th and King station

Construction
- Opened: November 15, 1973; 52 years ago
- Renovated: 2011

Website
- theendupsf.com

The EndUp is a nightclub in San Francisco, California. Opened in 1973, the club is located at 6th Street and Harrison in the South of Market district. Known for its status as an afterhours club, the venue has hosted a variety of benefits and events during its time as part of San Francisco's nightlife community. The EndUp's location is part of San Francisco's Leather and LGBTQ Cultural District.

== History ==
The nightclub's only location has been the site of a former 22-room hotel at the corner of 6th and Harrison. The club has gone through several periods of ownership during its time, the majority of it spent under three brothers from the Hanken family.

=== Al Hanken era (1973–1989) ===
The EndUp opened on November 15, 1973 as a differentiated version of the RoundUp, owner Al Hanken's LGBTQ country western-themed venue located one block north of the EndUp at 298 6th Street and Folsom. Mister Marcus, a writer for San Francisco's monthly LGBT magazine Kalendar, described the EndUp's opening in his column Man About Town:

The long-awaited EndUp opened last Thursday too and you have to see it to believe it. I was lucky to get a demonstration of their quadraphonic sound system long ago. It's a big dance bar and certainly will add to the ambiance of Harrison Street. Congratulations to Al Hanken and Greg Loughner on their latest "baby".

One of the events held at the club during this era was the Jockey Short Dance Contest (1974–1978). Taking its name from the type of underwear, the contest was a common event in San Francisco gay clubs during the mid-1970s. Al Hanken believed strong incentives like the contest were necessary to bring patrons to the EndUp's South of Market district from the Castro district, some 2 miles (3.2 km) away, as the bars there were already featuring their own versions. Randy Johnson served as emcee of the EndUp's Sunday afternoon contest along with DJs Steve Newman, Peter D. Struve, and Rod Kimbel. Offering first and second-place winners $150 and $50 respectively, the EndUp's contest gained wider notice when it was featured in the weekly serialized newspaper column Tales of the City and later in the novels of the same name by San Francisco author Armistead Maupin.

When the EndUp's sister club the RoundUp closed in 1977, Al Hanken's focus went towards developing the EndUp's burgeoning DJ talent. DJs Steve Fabus and Patrick Cowley hosted the recurring event Church (1979–1982) which started at 6:00 a.m. to accommodate patrons who had just left the Trocadero Transfer nightclub. Patrick Cowley also hosted an event called Menergy (1981–1982) until his death in 1982.

=== Helmut Hanken era (1989–1996) ===
Al Hanken died in 1989, leaving the club to his brother, Helmut Hanken. During this era, events such as Club Uranus (1989–1992) created by DJs Lewis Walden and Michael Blue featured a community of artists performing as art dancers and drag queens, celebrating creative energies through go-go dancing. The show featured co-host Jerome Caja and a cast of drag performance artists such as Trauma Flintstone, Diet Popstitute, Steven Maxxine, Tina-go-go, Tony Vaguely, Kitty Litter, Pussy Tourette and Elvis Herselvis. Running concurrent to this was Klub Dekadence (1991–1993) on Friday nights with DJ Bugie.

Helmut Hanken died four years after inheriting the club from his brother. The last will and testament of Helmut Hanken named the EndUp's operational manager, Douglas Carl Whitmore, as executor of his estate. From the position of executorial trustee, Whitmore was able to influence operations at the club more directly and with less oversight than would normally be the case with managers. During this period of time the EndUp experienced numerous internal difficulties involving financial and employee turmoil, with the club eventually filing for Chapter 11 bankruptcy protection in 1995 and its employees seeking to unionize themselves in response to what they perceived were threats to their job security. Those who attempted to join together in a union were dismissed from working, and many of these employees then began picketing the EndUp in protest. After employees threatened legal action, the venue reached a monetary settlement to end the dispute; at least one worker donated his settlement funds to the Queer Victory Labor Fund.

Pointing to Whitmore's management of the club as the cause of its difficulties, a third Hanken brother, Carl, began legal proceedings in Marin County to have Whitmore removed as executor of Helmut Hanken's estate, whereupon a brief interregnum of court-disputed ownership for the club began. In April 1996, Marin Superior Court commissioner Mary Grove ended the dispute by terminating Whitmore's executorship, saying he had "mismanaged the estate, wasted the estate's assets (and) wrongfully neglected the estate." With a new executor in control, Helmut Hanken's estate immediately sold the club to Carl Hanken.

Having lost control of the venue, Whitmore confronted Carl Hanken at the latter's Kentfield residence on July 24, 1996. After chasing Hanken out of his house at gunpoint, Whitmore shot Hanken in the back. Whitmore then fled the scene, and a two-week long manhunt ensued, ending with Whitmore committing suicide amidst police efforts to apprehend him after a standoff in Millbrae. Carl Hanken subsequently recovered from his injuries.

=== Carl Hanken era (1996–2005) ===
In contrast with the internal challenges seen during the previous era, the era under Carl Hanken experienced outside challenges, including San Francisco Police Department commander Dennis Martel's vice squad and their attempts at closing or curtailing nightclub venues in the South of Market district. Events such as Fag Fridays (1996–2008) featuring DJ David Harness, saw expansion of the club's operating hours. Opening at 11:00 p.m. Friday evenings until 6:00 a.m. Saturdays, Fag Fridays combination of patrons from the LGBT and straight-friendly communities as well as its unconventional business hours were rare among Bay area nightclubs at the time. By the end of this era the EndUp's longest running continual event was its Sunday morning tea dance, an event which had been occurring in one form or another and produced completely in-house, since 1979.

=== Leung era (2005–2012) ===
In August 2005 the club was sold by Carl Hanken to a group of six investors headed by Bay Area attorney Sydney Leung. These new owners kept intact the club's affinity for gay disco and underground house music. Those styles, along with reggae, mash-ups, breakbeat, techno, tech house, electro house, minimal techno and microhouse continued to attract top-tier DJ's from around the world, including Derrick Carter, Doc Martin, Mark Farina, Miguel Migs, Tommy Sunshine, Ellen Ferrato, DJ Sneak and Josh Wink. In 2009 the club received industry recognition with the awards "Best DJs", "Best Dance Club", and "Best Outdoor Bar".

=== Stiener era (2012–present) ===
After undertaking renovations in 2011 and other improvements to ensure the EndUp's legacy and its brand, Sydney Leung and four of his partners sold their shares in the venue to their business partner Ynez Stiener. Stiener had previously been part owner and managing director of the EndUp. Events during this period include Sunrise Sunday featuring DJs Mauricio Aviles, Gene Hunt, Ruben Mancias, Julius Papp, Miguel Migs, Norm Stradley, Jay-J, and Franky Boissy. The venue in this era has moved beyond its core focus upon the LGBT community to embrace a wider mix of clientele.

==== 2016 deaths ====
In 2016, two separate incidents of violence involving club patrons occurred in or just outside of the EndUp. In the first incident on June 5, 2016, officers responding to the sound of gunshots entered the EndUp around 2:00 a.m. after witnessing several people hurriedly exiting the building. Inside, police found 19-year-old Sean Ford suffering from gunshot wounds. Ford was taken to a hospital where he died. Two suspects were initially arrested and charged, but the charges were later dropped for lack of evidence.

Four months later on October 2, 2016, an argument which began inside of the EndUp became physical once it moved outside the club. 26-year-old John Sanyaolu, accompanied by his friends and relatives who had joined him at the club, was shot along with two of his relatives. Sanyaolu died of his injuries after his assailants fled the scene.

== Cultural district inclusion ==
In 2018, The EndUp was included as part of San Francisco's Leather and LGBTQ Cultural District.

== In popular culture ==
- Michael "Mouse" Tolliver, one of the principal characters from Armistead Maupin's Tales of the City, enters and wins the "Mr. EndUp Dance Contest" to help pay his rent. For the 1993 TV adaptation, the nearby Firehouse 7 on 16th St. (aka Kilowatt Bar) stood in for both the interior and exterior of The EndUp.
- The end of Ricardo Bracho's 1997 play The Sweetest Hangover features an extended dialogue at the EndUp between two characters discussing their future.
- At the conclusion of the Saturday night Bay Area rave depicted in the 2000 film Groove, the characters Cliff and Beth are shown the Sunday morning after going to the EndUp.
