= Hubba Hubba Revue =

San Francisco–based neo-burlesque and variety show

The Hubba Hubba Revue is a San Francisco–based neo-burlesque and variety show which opened in September 2006 and continues with weekly and monthly shows in San Francisco and Oakland.

== Shows and locations ==
There are three versions of the show, all called The Hubba Hubba Revue. The main show is staged monthly on second Fridays at "DNA Lounge" in San Francisco, California. The burlesque and variety show involves dozens of local and touring performers. There are weekly shows every Monday at a smaller room in the same venue. A smaller monthly show was staged on the fourth Saturday at the "Uptown Nightclub" in Oakland, California. The Oakland show closed down in 2019. There are additional occasional shows staged for holidays or special occasions in the San Francisco Bay Area.

== Description and cast ==
Jim Sweeney produces the show. He originally hosted Hubba Hubba Revue (as "Kingfish"), with co-host Eddie Dane. Dane died in March 2011. Jim Sweeney continues to host the show with co-host Alexa von Kickinface, and "Hooray Hostess" Maggie Motorboat as well as a rotating cast of co-hosts including Lee Presson from the swing revival band Lee Presson and the Nails, Jay Siren of Sacramento's "Sizzling Sirens Burlesque Experience" and, until her death in an automobile accident in May 2013, international burlesque star, Sparkly Devil.

Each monthly Hubba Hubba Revue show at DNA Lounge has a different theme, reflected in the burlesque acts, the opening skit, the go-go dancers' costumes and the flyer art. The rotating cast of characters includes female and male burlesque performers, as well as acrobats, aerialists, comedians, contortionists, magicians, vocalists, and other such variety performers. Although many of the acts are from the San Francisco Bay Area, a large and growing number of visiting performers from cities across the country and around the world have performed with Hubba Hubba Revue shows.

== Flyer art ==
For each The Hubba Hubba Revue production, flyer artwork is commissioned from local artists. From 2006 to 2009, R. Black was responsible for the monthly "main-show" flyers. Black also introduced the idea of a "flyer girl" . Every month, a different performer would be chosen as the subject of the flyer. In January 2008, Sparkly Devil became The Hubba Hubba Revue's first flyer girl. That month's theme was Creepshow Peepshow. Black also implemented the printing of flyers to a 2″ × 6″ bookmark size as well as the standard 4″ × 6″ (1/4 page) size. In February 2010, performer/illustrator Casey Castille took over "main show" flyer duties. As of 2015, Castille continues to produce monthly flyers and posters for the show.

== Notability and awards ==
On December 8, 2010, The Hubba Hubba Revue was named on the Travel Channel's list of Top 10 Best Burlesque Shows in the world. This was the show's first non-local recognition. Since its inception in 2006, The Hubba Hubba Revue has received the following awards:

- "Best Cabaret/Variety Show", SF Bay Guardians "Best of the Bay 2008"
- "Best Burlesque Show", East Bay Express Reader's Choice, 2008
- "Best Burlesque Show", East Bay Express, 2008
- "Best Burlesque Show", SF Weeklys "Best of 2009"
- "Best Burlesque", 7x7 Magazines "Best of San Francisco 2010"
- "Best Burlesque Act", SF Bay Guardian Best of the Bay 2011 - Reader's Poll
- "Best Burlesque", SF Bay Guardian Best of the Bay 2012 - Reader's Poll
- "Best Burlesque", SF Bay Guardian Best of the Bay 2013 - Reader's Poll
- "Best MC", SF Bay Guardian Best of SF 2013

== List of shows ==
Below is a list of the monthly "big" shows. The "Your Tour Guide for Entertainment" is how the traditional card girl is referred to at the show. Updates to the list are welcome.

Date	Theme	Emcees	Your Tour Guide for Entertainment	Performers	Location
9/11/2015	9th Anniversary Show	Kingfish, Alexa Von Kickinface, Lee Presson, Jay Siren	Honey LeBang		DNA Lounge
10/9/2015	Asylum!	Kingfish, Alexa Von Kickinface, Lee Presson			DNA Lounge
11/13/2-15	A Burlesque Fairy Tale	Kingfish, Alexa Von Kickinface	Vala Mar'Velle		DNA Lounge
12/11/2015	A Hubba Christmas Carol	Kingfish, Alexa Von Kickinface	Vala Mar'Velle		DNA Lounge
1/8/2016	Warrior Women!	Kingfish, Jay Siren	Chestie LaRoux		DNA Lounge
2/12/2016	St. Valentine's Day Massacre	Kingfish,			DNA Lounge
3/11/2016	Villainesses!	Kingfish, Alexa Von Kickinface, Lee Presson	Maggie Motorboat		DNA Lounge
4/8/2016	Cartoon Funhouse!	Kingfish, Alexa Von Kickinface, Dave Haas-Baroque	Ariyana LaFey		DNA Lounge
5/13/2016	Murder Mansion	Kingfish, Alexa Von Kickinface, Jay Siren	Ariyana LaFey		DNA Lounge
6/10/2-16	Burlesque Nation!	Kingfish, Alexa Von Kickinface, Lee Presson	Ariyana LaFey		DNA Lounge
7/8/2016	Summer Camp	Kingfish, Alexa Von Kickinface	Maggie Motorboat		DNA Lounge
8/12/2016	Post-Apocalypse	Kingfish			DNA Lounge
9/9/2016	10th Anniversary	Kingfish, Alexa Von Kickinface, Lee Presson	Chestie LaRoux		DNA Lounge
10/14/2016	Damsels & Dragons	Kingfish, Alexa Von Kickinface,	Red Velvet		DNA Lounge
11/11/2016	Brovember!	Kingfish, Broseph Joe Brody	Brosephina		DNA Lounge
