= Jerome Caja =

American painter (1958–1995)

- Born: January 20, 1958; Cleveland, Ohio, USA
- Died: November 3, 1995 (aged 37); San Francisco, California, USA
- Education: Cleveland State University (BFA), San Francisco Art Institute (MFA)
- Known for: mixed media performance art
- Movement: Queercore

Jerome Caja (1958–1995) was an American mixed-media painter and Queercore performance artist in San Francisco, California in the 1980s and early 1990s.

== Early life and education ==
Jerome David Caja was born on January 20, 1958, in Cleveland, Ohio. Raised in a strict Catholic family, Caja was one of 11 sons. He referred to his family as full of jocks, although he himself was a frail sickly child. Caja having been raised in a strict Catholic household was early on heavily influenced by the imagery of saints and martyrs. Caja graduated from St. Edward High School, an all-boys Catholic school, where he suffered poor grades due to dyslexia.

Caja began his college education at Cuyahoga Community College, and later attended Cleveland State University, where he earned a Bachelor of Fine Arts degree in 1984. He then moved to San Francisco to attend the San Francisco Art Institute and graduated with a Master of Fine Arts degree in 1986.

== Career ==
In the late 1980s, Caja became a well-known artistic personality within the radical gay scene in San Francisco. Caja performed as a drag queen and go-go dancer in San Francisco's queer punk nightclubs, where his performance art has been described as "post-apocalyptic deconstructive drag." In one Easter performance at Club Uranus, Caja in drag performed an elaborate reenactment of the crucifixion and resurrection of Jesus.

Caja began by producing ceramic sculptures and then he moved on to create paintings. Caja crafted miniature mixed-media artworks which he created from everyday materials, especially those used by drag queens such as nail polish, sequins, lace and glitter. Caja was a fan of makeup even before he was diagnosed with AIDS, so he transferred his own affection for makeup straight into his artistic work. Many of Caja's works were influenced by Catholic iconography and satirized Christian morality. Professor of Communication Fred Turner described Caja's paintings as "fragments of a private allegory – often dizzyingly grotesque, but also glorious, gentle and sad." While in his other artwork, he tried to express his own fearlessness.

== Death ==
In August and September 1995, the Archives of American Art recorded an oral history interview with Caja, in which he said he tested positive for HIV around 1989 and began to show symptoms of sickness around 1992; among his afflictions was CMV retinitis. Caja died of AIDS in San Francisco on November 3, 1995. His memorial service was held at the Hole in the Wall gay bar in South of Market, San Francisco.

== In museums and archives ==
The San Francisco Museum of Modern Art (SFMOMA) owns a dozen works by Caja, ten of them gifted by the artist the year of his death, 1995.

Caja's Head of John the Baptist is in the collection of the Los Angeles County Museum of Art, which also owns a portrait of Caja by photographer Catherine Opie.

Caja's personal papers and effects are archived in the Smithsonian Archives of American Art, which also holds two artworks by Caja, an untitled drawing and an untitled self-portrait.

Caja can be seen in the short film Complainers by director David Weissman in the collection of the New York Public Library.

The Jerome Project, a nonprofit organization, was created by Anthony Cianciolo to preserve and protect the legacy of Jerome Caja as an important 20th century artist and not simply as a marginalized, controversial, gay artist.
