= Death Guild =

Dance club in San Francisco, California

- Status: active
- Genre: gothic/industrial
- Begins: 9:30PM
- Frequency: weekly, Mondays
- Venue: DNA Lounge
- Locations: SoMa, San Francisco
- Coordinates: 37°46′15.63″N 122°24′45.70″W
- Country: United States
- Years active: 33
- Founded: March 15, 1993
- Founder: David King (DJ Decay)
- Capacity: 800
- Major events: 18+ dance club night and webcast
- Website: http://www.deathguild.com/

Death Guild is the oldest continually operating gothic/industrial dance club in the United States, and second in the world (preceded only by Slimelight in London). Death Guild opened on March 15, 1993, and is currently held every Monday at DNA Lounge in San Francisco.

Death Guild has always been an 18-and-over dance club, a rarity in San Francisco where most dance clubs are 21+. Death Guild has also been the promoter of most of the gothic and industrial live shows in San Francisco since the mid-1990s.

The Death Guild crew have also been responsible for a theme camp at Burning Man since the mid-1990s, which is well known for the Death Guild Thunderdome.

== History ==
The party was created by David King (DJ Decay) at the now-defunct venue The Pit (now AsiaSF). In June 1994, the club moved to DNA Lounge for one night, and then to the Trocadero Transfer, which remained its home for several years, with DJs Decay, Lucretia, Melting Girl, Joe Radio and Damon. The Trocadero began having licensing problems in 1997, eventually closing for good in early 1998. In March 1997, Death Guild moved to Big Heart City, and then to Manhattan Lounge in November 1998. It returned to Big Heart City in June 2003, and in October 2003 moved to Glas Kat, a new venue in the old Trocadero space.

Death Guild finally returned to DNA Lounge in October 2008, immediately after DNA Lounge had succeeded in changing its liquor license from 21+ to one that allows 18+ and all-ages events. Resident DJs are currently Decay, Melting Girl and Joe Radio in the main room, with DJ Sage and DJ Bit in the upstairs lounge.

Both rooms play a mix of gothic rock, industrial, darkwave, EBM, futurepop, power noise, and synthpop.

DNA Lounge has been providing free audio and video webcasts of all the club's events since its 2001 renovation, so Death Guild has been continuously streaming live over the Internet from the venue every Monday night since October 2008.

When non-essential San Francisco businesses were forced to suspend operations in early 2020 due to the global COVID-19 pandemic, Death Guild immediately went online-only via DNA Lounge's webcast. The venue reopened for live events on June 18, 2021, allowing Death Guild to resume in-person nights on June 21, 2021. With Slimelight still closed due to the COVID-19 pandemic, Death Guild then became the longest-running active goth club in the world.

== Thunderdome ==
The Death Guild camp at Burning Man features one of the event's most popular attractions, the Thunderdome, a recreation in the appropriate desert setting of the arena from the film Mad Max Beyond Thunderdome. Participants in the Death Guild Thunderdome engage in improvised combat using padded mock weapons while suspended in harnesses from the top of the arena via bungee cords. Spectators climb the exterior lattice of the arena to observe from the sides and above. After 25 years on playa (and two years off), Death Guild Thunderdome will be taking a break from Burning Man in 2026.They look forward to returning in 2027.

== Awards ==
Death Guild won "Best Weeknight Dance Club" in SF Weekly's "Best of San Francisco" readers' poll in 2001, and won "Best Dance Party" in the San Francisco Bay Guardian's "Best of the Bay" readers' poll in 2020. It was runner up for "Best Dance Party" in 2021.
