= Trocadero Transfer =

Former dance club in San Francisco, California, US

Coordinates: 37°46′44.7″N 122°23′52.4″W

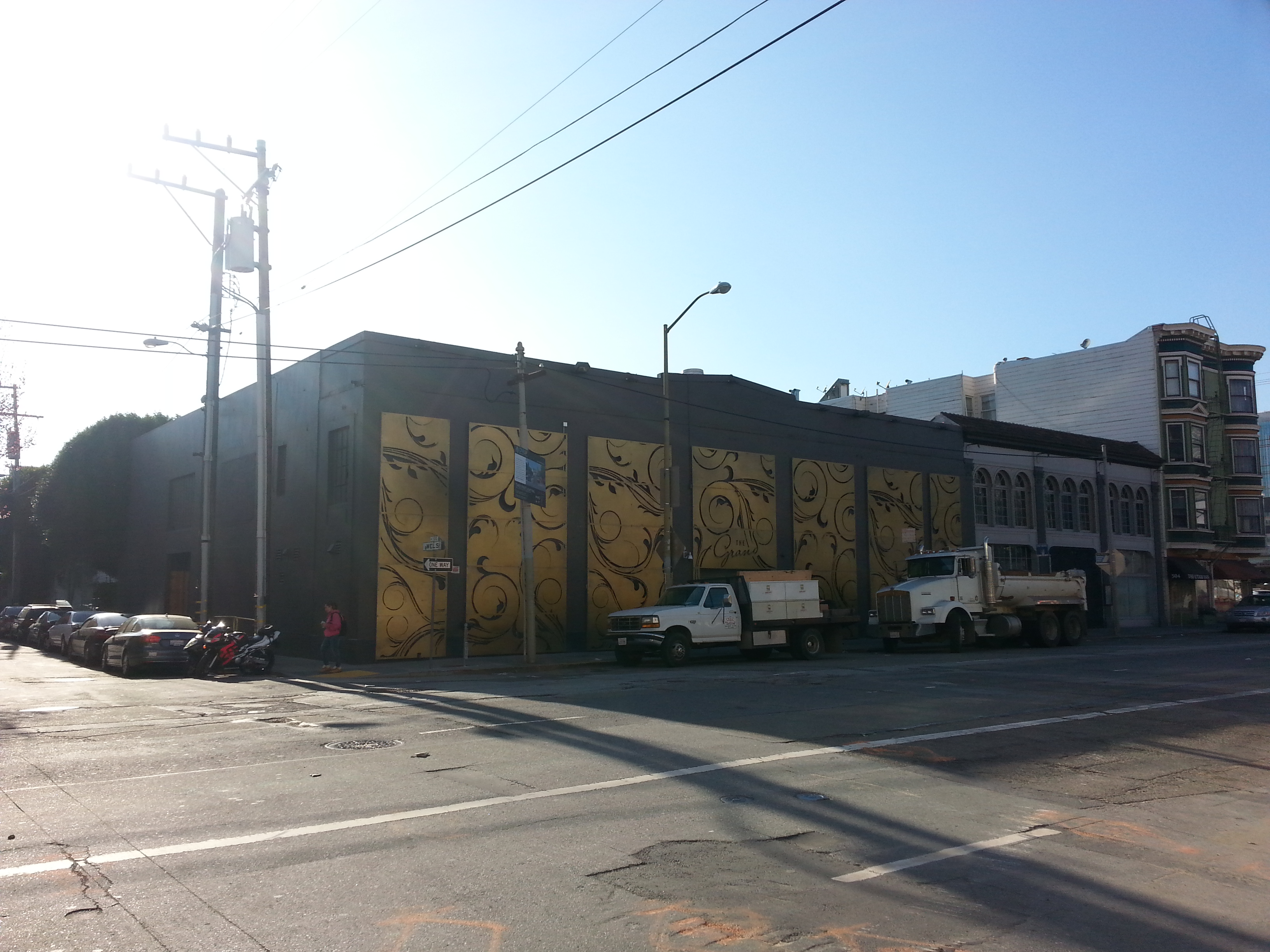
The Grand SF nightclub, after remodeling; formerly the Trocadero Transfer building

The Trocadero Transfer, or The Troc, was an after hours dance club in operation from December 1977 to the late–1990s in San Francisco, California, U.S.. It was located at 520 4th Street at Bryant in the SoMa neighborhood. The club has been compared to Studio 54 in New York City, and their patrons would travel from other cities to attend the party.

The former club building was sold and remodeled, it was renamed the Glas Kat (from 2000 to 2011) and The Grand (from 2011 until present).

== History ==
The Trocadero Transfer was founded by Dick Collier in December 1977. The building had once housed several work spaces of television station KQED.

The club stayed open on Saturday nights until 6 a.m. The entire Golden Gate Business Association (San Francisco's Gay business association) had to go down to the San Francisco Board of Permit Appeals to make sure that the Trocadero got its after hours license, and even then it was a while before the club was allowed to serve alcohol after hours. People came to the Trocadero after the I-Beam closed at 2 a.m., and after the Trocadero closed at 6 a.m., those who still wanted to dance could after 1980 go to The EndUp, which opened at 6 a.m. Sunday morning.

== Description of the dance space ==
Somewhat off-center of the dance floor, there was a narrow metal spiral staircase with clear plastic arms that went up from the dance floor to the balcony above where people could watch the dancers below. This spiral staircase was sometimes called The Crystal Staircase ("Crystal Staircase" is a slang term used by gay African Americans. It refers to situations where someone has an easy life [someone who is born wealthy, has received a large inheritance, has gotten a job that is a sinecure, etc.]. Of course, crystal also refers to methamphetamine, which many patrons of the club took to stay up all night dancing.) Gender illusionists made a great show of ascending or descending the crystal staircase.

Hanging from the ceiling at the center of the dance floor, there was the hypnotic mirror ball cluster—about a dozen mirror balls of various sizes which continually spun around and were the focus of the dance floor.

== DJs ==
Some of the DJs who played at the Trocadero included Bobby Viteritti (the primary DJ at the Trocadero from 1978 to 1981), Patrick Cowley, Gary Tighe, Michael Whitehead, Michael Lewis, Billy Langenheim, Steve Smith, Ralph Zepeda, Rob Kimbel, Lester Temple, Michael Garrett, Robbie Leslie, Trip (Tripper) Ringwald, Paul Naif, and Steve Fabus.

== Disco parties ==
There were many disco parties (the smaller, local one-night predecessors in the late 1970s and during the 1980s of what became after 1990 the much larger multi-day circuit parties) at the Trocadero. The names of some of these parties were the White Party (held Easter weekend), the Black Party (held the weekends before Walpurgis night and Halloween, at which many danced in skimpy black leather outfits), and the Red Party (held the weekend before Valentine's Day). At the height of the AIDS epidemic, because fewer people were going out dancing, from 1987 to 1989, the Trocadero was partially closed down and only hosted Disco Parties and special events.

== Clubs (1989–2011) ==
In the spring of 1989, at the suggestion of Steve Fabus, San Francisco gay dance party promoter Gus Bean began his first house music club at the Trocadero, the Crew Club. A couple of times in the early 1990s, San Francisco's first massive rave, the Toontown Club was held at the Trocadero. In 1995 and 1996, the Temple Club, a gay nightclub, was held at the Trocadero Transfer on Saturday nights.

=== Bondage-a-Go-Go ===
The Bondage-a-Go-Go fetish club began on Wednesday nights in early 1993 and continued at the Trocadero until 2000, when it moved to the Cat Club on Wednesday nights at 1190 Folsom Street near 8th Street. In 2004, it moved back to the Glas Kat (the successor nightclub to the Trocadero at 520 4th Street). In 2011, due to the remodeling, Bondage-a-Go-Go moved back to the Cat Club again and decided not to go back after the Glas Kat was remodeled into the Grand Ballroom, remaining at the Cat Club until 2020 when the club night was dissolved during the global COVID-19 pandemic.

=== Death Guild ===
The other long-running club at the Trocadero was Death Guild, which moved to the Troc in 1992 from the Pit (after one night at DNA Lounge). This gothic industrial club ran on Mondays at the Trocadero until 1997, returning to the space as the Glas Cat in 2003 and continuing there until late 2008, when it returned to DNA Lounge (although it was briefly replaced at the Glas Kat by a now-defunct club called Deathwish). Also in the mid-1990s Death Guild spawned a theme camp of the same name at Burning Man, widely known for its Thunderdome, first built in 1999.

== Nostalgia parties since 2000 ==
When the Trocadero was remodeled in 2000 and renamed the Glas Kat, the Crystal Staircase was removed. Before the Glas Kat remodel, a large birdcage-like go-go dance cage resided on a corner of the stage in the club since 1989. In the mid 1990s, a second similar cage was hung from the ceiling. In early 2007, the original cage was hung on the ceiling. In 2009, the cage was taken out.

From 2000 to 2011, a number of Trocadero Transfer disco nostalgia events were held at the Glas Kat. These are called the Play Party and the Remember the Party parties. At these parties, the original sound of the Trocadero in the late 1970s and early 1980s was reproduced by today's DJs (the Glas Kat had go-go boxes to dance on, which did not exist in the original Trocadero). Some DJs played at the Remember the Party party who played at the original Trocadero Transfer during the 1980s.

== See also ==
- Trocadero – a San Francisco road house, gambling joint, and dance hall that existed from 1892 to 1930.
