= Steve Fabus =

American disc jockey (born 1951)

- Born: June 29, 1951 (age 74) Chicago, Illinois, U.S.
- Origin: San Francisco, California, U.S.
- Genres: Disco, hi-NRG, R&B, house
- Years active: 1975–present

Steve Fabus is an American disco, hi-NRG and house music disc jockey from Chicago, known for popularizing the 1970s version of the tea dance style of Sunday disco dancing, as well as the gay bathhouse sound of San Francisco, emphasizing emotional R&B vocals and slower tempos. Fabus has served residencies at the San Francisco nightclubs the I-Beam, the Trocadero Transfer and The EndUp, at the New York City River Club and Tracks, and in Los Angeles at Probe, Axis and Asylum. He has deejayed major circuit parties, private parties and international festivals. He co-founded Go BANG!, a disco revival party in San Francisco. He has been a resident deejay at Hothouse. He regularly mixes for the Burning Man group Comfort & Joy.

== Career ==
Fabus was born and raised in Chicago, where he grew to appreciate the R&B music of artists such as Stevie Wonder and Etta James. He gravitated to mixing vinyl records with reel-to-reel tapes at house parties. Fabus was coming out at the time, discovering Chicago's gay bars such as Den One and PQ's. He began to visit San Francisco in 1971, returning home each time after a few months. In Chicago, he was intrigued by unusual dance music such as Hamilton Bohannon's "Bohannon's Beat" that he heard at Dugan's Bistro, a gay club with music spun by Louie DeVito, Fabus's first major career influence.

=== San Francisco 1975–1983 ===
Fabus relocated to San Francisco in 1975 and kept mixing house parties; at one of these, he met the Cockettes, led by the effervescent Sylvester. He started deejaying for gay bathhouses. His style was known as "sleaze", a kind of mid-tempo music mix with uplifting or romantic vocals. Fabus felt that the bathhouse scene was more relaxed and freeform, allowing him to play music with a tempo around 90–100 beats per minute (BPM). He later said, "With the music, you could get intimate, you could get spacey." He was chosen by disco promoter Rod Roderick to headline the Boiler Room in 1977, a massive private party. His bathhouse contacts led to a residency at the I-Beam, newly opened by Bob Wharton and Sanford Kellman as San Francisco's biggest disco. Fabus deejayed there during 1977–1978, emphasizing the R&B and soul side of disco music, with vinyl releases from Salsoul, Prelude, Casablanca and West End Records. Fabus was inspired by Tim Rivers, a fellow I-Beam disc jockey.

For almost three years, 1976–1978, George Moscone served as Mayor of San Francisco with a friendly view regarding the gay community. After Moscone was murdered, Dianne Feinstein succeeded him, and she began reining in what she saw as the community's excesses. Fabus was mixing a huge private event called the Red Hanky Party in April 1979 when the SF police entered the Gay Community Center at 3 am, surrounded Fabus in the DJ booth, and demanded he shut down the sound system. Fabus announced over the microphone that "the cops are here" and they were closing the party. Fabus recalled that Feinstein had also made it more difficult for gay bathhouses to obtain business licenses.

Fabus was hired to mix at the Trocadero Transfer, a new club styled after 12 West in New York City. "The Troc" was the first San Francisco discotheque to be allowed to stay open all night, bringing Manhattan-style dance parties lasting many hours. Other clubs followed suit, and San Francisco became the center of the West Coast gay disco scene.

In 1980, Fabus started deejaying at The EndUp on Sunday mornings. The time slot allowed Fabus to reinvigorate the gay tea dance concept, fusing his "morning music" sleaze style with the hi-NRG sounds popular at the time. Patrons at the Sunday morning event began calling it "church". Fabus joined Sylvester's engineer/composer Patrick Cowley to mix music for special events at The EndUp. In 1981, HIV/AIDS was identified as a disease common to gay men, and in 1982, Cowley died of AIDS, though it was misdiagnosed. More men died of the disease, shocking the gay community, and Fabus observed that the disco scene had lost its "psychedelic, laidback vibe". This was replaced by a sense of fatalistic desperation, the dancers pushing to enjoy whatever remaining time before the mysterious disease might attack. This audience wanted a more powerful "tribal" experience, with pounding beats preferred over R&B and soul.

Fabus was invited by Sylvester to serve as deejay for a record release party in December 1982, celebrating Sylvester's new album All I Need, Cowley's final collaboration. Fabus mixed for a packed house at the former Dreamland club on Harrison Street (now The Vendry.)

=== New York 1983–1988 ===
Fabus was invited to New York City to mix vinyl at Tracks and the former 12 West which was operating as the River Club. He stayed current with his peers at The Saint and Paradise Garage. He worked in New York to develop an eclectic musical style, incorporating the new house music along with European tracks and more. Fabus said, "I would say there were more developments and different directions established in the ’80s than in any other decade of dance music. It was arguably the most musically diverse decade."

=== California 1988–present ===
Fabus returned to San Francisco in 1988 to re-open Dreamland. He also mixed at Crew, the new name of the Trocadero Transfer. While deejaying at Dreamland one night, Fabus was informed by management that Sylvester was visiting, looking down at the dance floor from the balcony. Sylvester was emaciated by AIDS, and had last been seen in public in a wheelchair at San Francisco's Gay Pride Parade in June. Fabus announced on his microphone that Sylvester was in the house, and the dance floor erupted in applause and foot stomping. Fabus put together a 45-minute set of Sylvester songs, then it was time for Sylvester to leave. Fabus brought the music mix to a complete halt, and in the silence Sylvester waved at the crowd and said "Thank you so much. Goodbye." Everyone started crying and shouting "We love you", and Fabus closed down the booth, knowing the night was over. Sylvester died in December 1988.

Fabus moved to Los Angeles in the early 1990s to mix at Probe, Axis and Asylum. He was part of a recurring after-hours disco party called Does Your Mama Know?

Fabus took a break from deejaying in 1995–1998 to treat and control his own case of HIV. Back in San Francisco, he co-founded Go BANG! in 2009, a recurring disco party styled after the 1970s and 1980s, with fellow DJ Sergio Fedasz. Fabus plays dates at festivals and clubs around the world, including Cocktail d'Amore in Berlin, Glastonbury Festival, Horse Meat Disco in London, and many more. Unusually, he played a silent disco in 2017 at Hardly Strictly Bluegrass, presenting a New York house set ranging from The Loft to Paradise Garage. He mixes regularly for Comfort & Joy, a queer-themed Burning Man organization hosting activities in San Francisco.
