= Lee Presson and the Nails =

American swing band

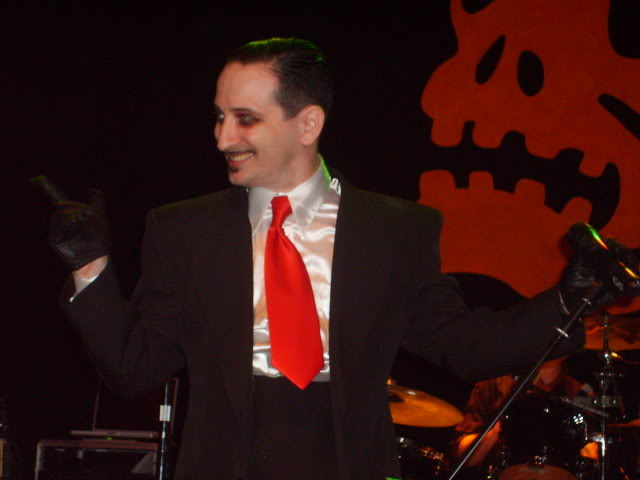
- Lee Presson performs in California in 2007.

Background information
- Origin: San Francisco, California
- Genres: Swing
- Years active: 1994–2004; 2006–present
- Website: leepresson.com

Lee Presson and the Nails is a swing band that formed in San Francisco in October 1994 during the late 1990s swing revival.

== History ==
The band won a California Music Award (Bammie) in 1998 for Best Swing/Cabaret Act and an SF Weekly Award for Best Swing Band later that year. The band temporarily disbanded in 2004 Lee Presson moved to Hollywood, where he played keyboard for the Oingo Boingo tribute band Dead Man's Party. Lee Presson and the Nails performed a reunion show in San Francisco on 16 September 2006 at the DNA Lounge. They played their final live show on October 25th, 2024. They still perform on their youtube channel.

== Discography ==
- Jump-Swing from Hell: Live at the Hi-Ball Lounge (Hep Cat, 1998)
- Swing is Dead (Hep Cat, 1999)
- Playing Dirty: LPN Live at the Derby (LPN Enterprises, 2000)
- El Bando En Fuego! (LPN, 2002)
- Balls in Your Face (LPN, 2010)
- Last Request (LPN, 2019)
