= Trocadero, San Francisco =

Historic building in San Francisco

Coordinates: 37.73621°N 122.47801°W

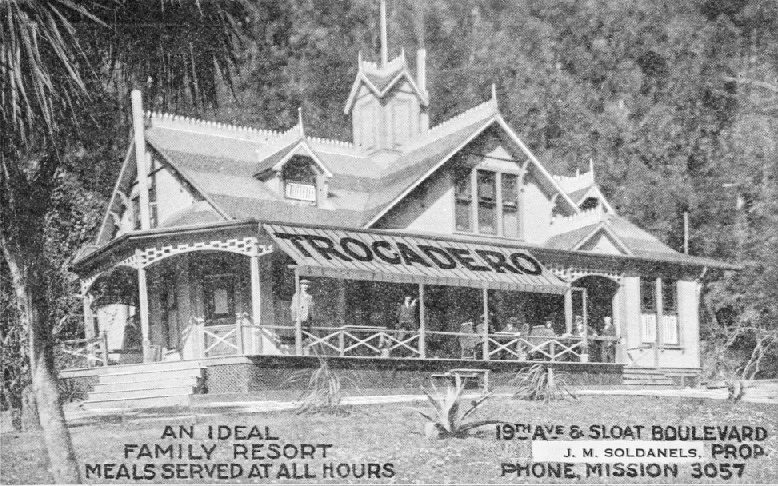
- Trocadero in c. 1920
- Interactive map of the Trocadero, San Francisco area

General information
- Year built: 1892

San Francisco Designated Landmark
- Designated: April 15, 2022
- Reference no.: 301

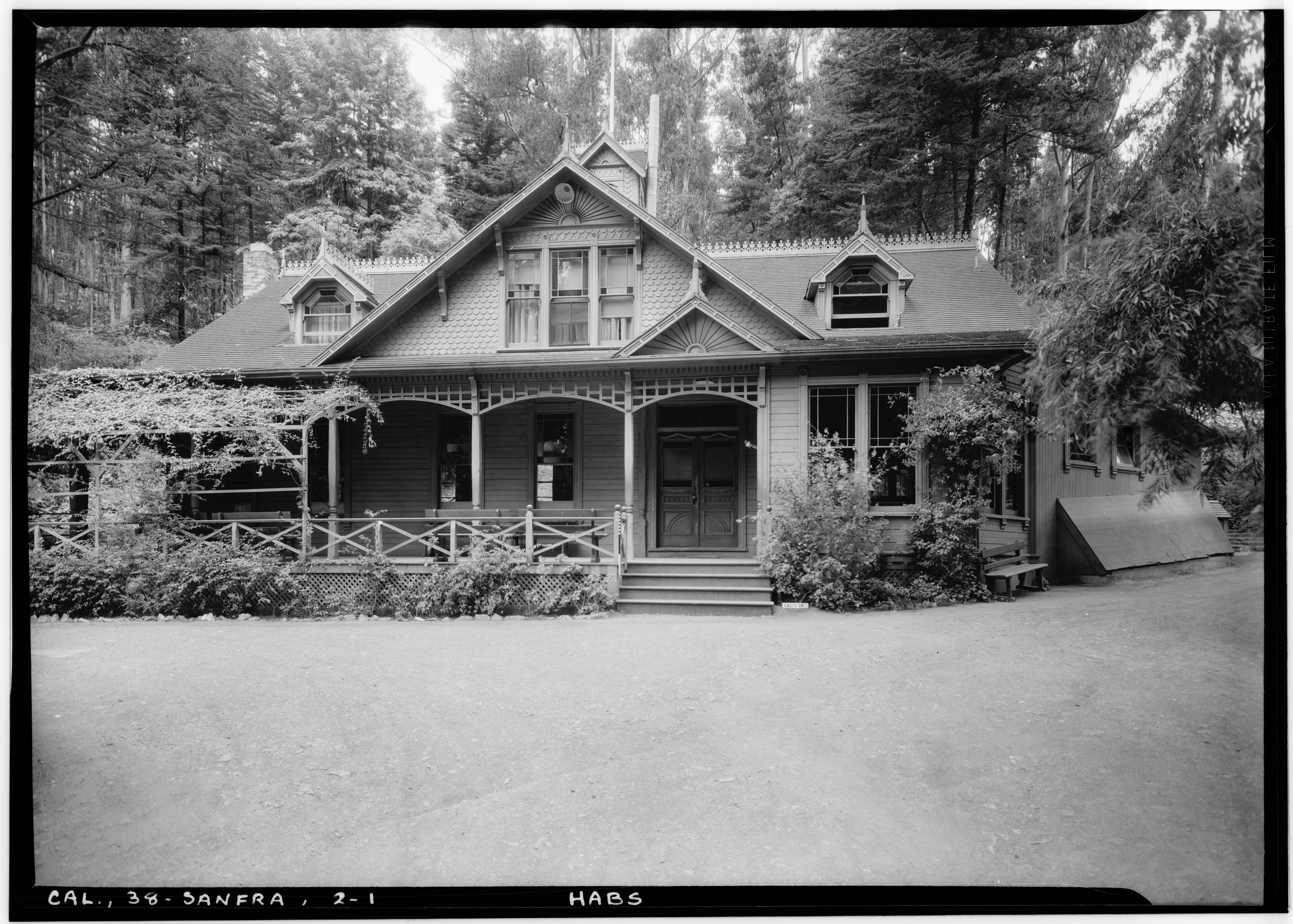
Building in 1936

The Trocadero is a historic building located in San Francisco. It was a lively roadhouse at the turn of the 20th century that offered gambling at roulette tables and dancing, as well as the best trout pond in California.

The building is listed as a San Francisco Designated Landmark, since April 15, 2022.

== History ==
It was opened in 1892, in a wooden building that had been brought around the Horn and was by reputation the first house built in San Francisco west of Twin Peaks, on the "rancho" of George Greene and the Greene family. The first seeds of Australian eucalyptus had been sown here, about 1871. Appropriately, it was at the Trocadero that Abe Ruef was found hiding, after his indictment in the notorious municipal graft trials of 1907.

In the 1930s, Bernard Maybeck recast the Trocadero Inn into a children's playground and renamed it the Sigmund Stern Recreation Grove.

On March 11, 2023, a large eucalyptus tree fell on the Trocadero, causing severe damage and flooding. The building reopened in 2025.

== Other uses ==
In San Francisco, "Trocadero" continued to have a connotation of stylish nighttime fun. In its heyday, the late 1970s and early 1980s, the Trocadero Transfer was regarded as the best hard-core—and largely gay—disco on the West Coast. It was among the half-dozen musical style-setters in the country.

Today, the Trocadero is used as the setting for the haunted house at the San Francisco Recreation and Parks Department's Scaregrove Halloween Festival, and the seasonal Stern Grove Music Festival.

== See also ==
- Trocadero (disambiguation), consequently, Trocadero is the name of several restaurants and clubs throughout the world
