= Adrian & the Mysterious D =

Adrian & the Mysterious D (A Plus D) were an American DJ duo who helped popularize mashup and bootleg music in America. The duo consisted of Adriana Roberts and Deidre Roberts. Based in San Francisco, the duo founded the Bootie club night in 2003, the first mashup bootleg party in the United States.

In 2005, they started a sister Bootie club in Los Angeles, and in 2007, launched Bootie parties in New York City and Paris, and in 2008, Munich and Boston. Bootie Mashup parties and one-offs in other cities followed.

Using their mashup name, A Plus D, they created dozens of tracks between 2004 and 2012. They often used music from lesser-known and alternative artists for their mixes.

They were nominated twice – 2004 and 2006 – in the "Best DJ" category in the SF Weekly Music Awards and in 2012 won a local "Nitey" award in San Francisco for "Best Club Promoter".

During their 15-year career, they staged "The A+D Show" several times at the DNA Lounge, a multimedia mashup show that mixed DJing with video and live performance.

The duo also toured Europe and Asia many times, with gigs in London, Paris, Berlin, Amsterdam, Munich, Copenhagen, Hong Kong, Beijing, and Sydney.

In early 2018, Mysterious D left Bootie Mashup to pursue other business interests, leaving Adriana A as the sole owner of the brand.
