= DNA Lounge =

Nightclub and pizza restaurant in San Francisco, California

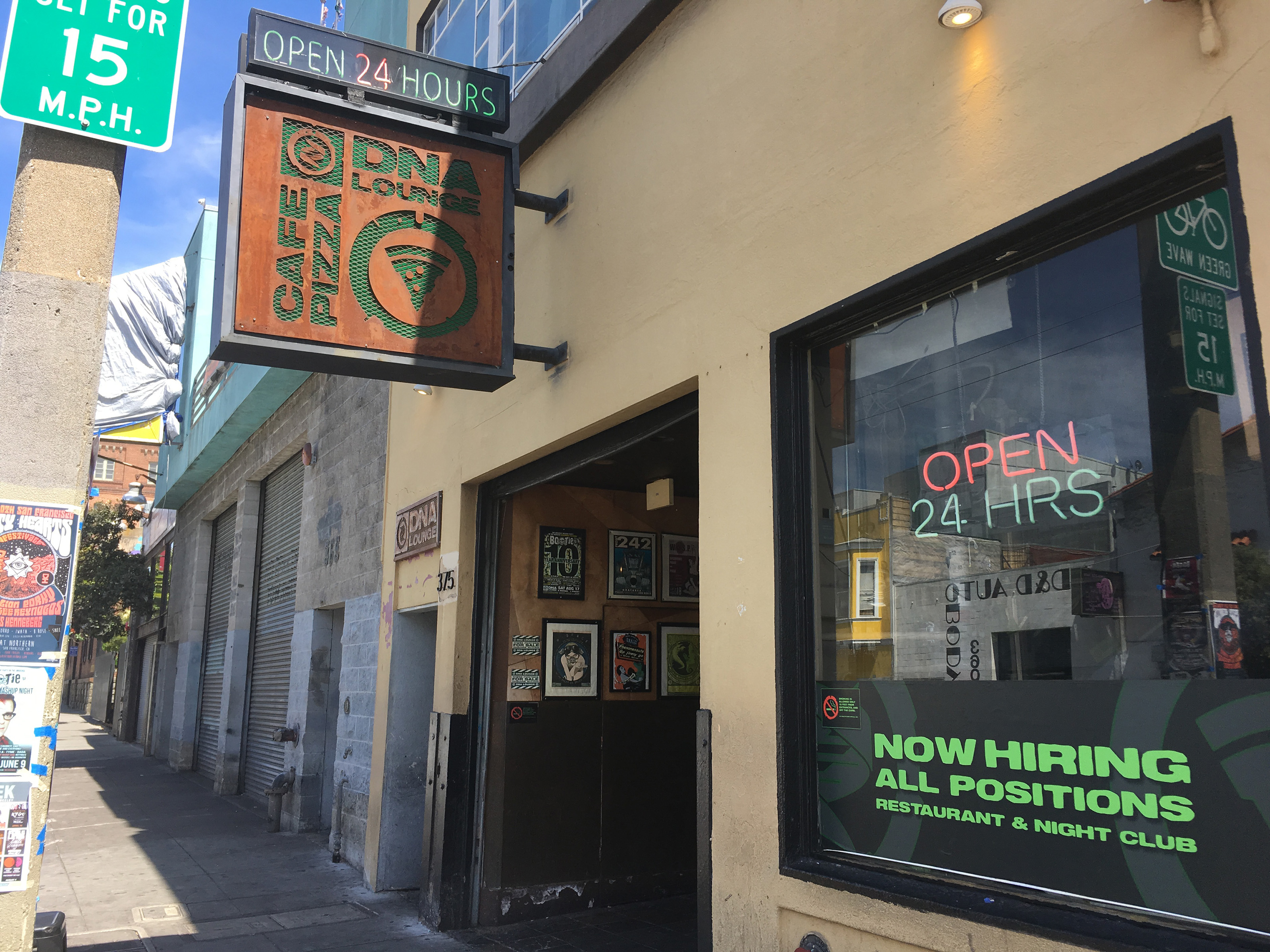
- Interactive map of DNA Lounge
- Address: 375 Eleventh Street; San Francisco, California; United States
- Location: SoMa, San Francisco
- Coordinates: 37°46′15.63″N 122°24′45.70″W
- Owner: Jamie Zawinski
- Capacity: about 1100
- Type: Nightclub, Restaurant, Cafe
- Event: Various
- Public transit: MUNI stop 13238

Construction
- Opened: November 22, 1985
- Renovated: July 13, 2001
- Expanded: October 23, 2012
- Years active: 40

Website
- http://www.dnalounge.com/

DNA Lounge is an all-ages nightclub, restaurant and cafe in the SoMa district of San Francisco owned by Jamie Zawinski, a former Netscape programmer and open-source software hacker. The club features DJ dancing, live music, burlesque performances, and occasionally conferences, private parties, and film premieres.

DNA Lounge has seven full bars, two stages, four dance floors, and a full service pizza restaurant and cafe. Since 2001, the club has been providing continuous audio and video webcasts of all events free of charge.

== Layout ==
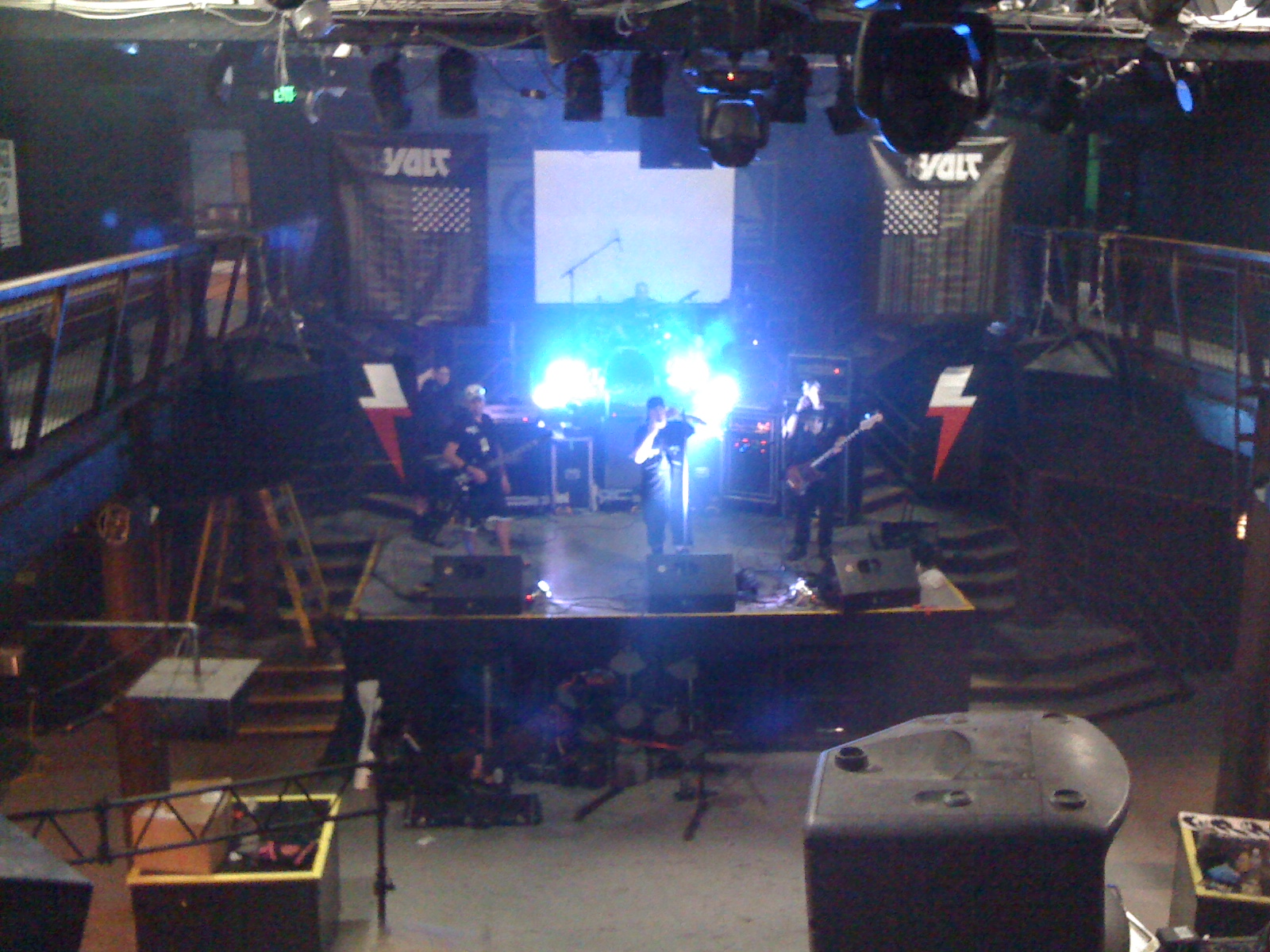
Sound check, 2009

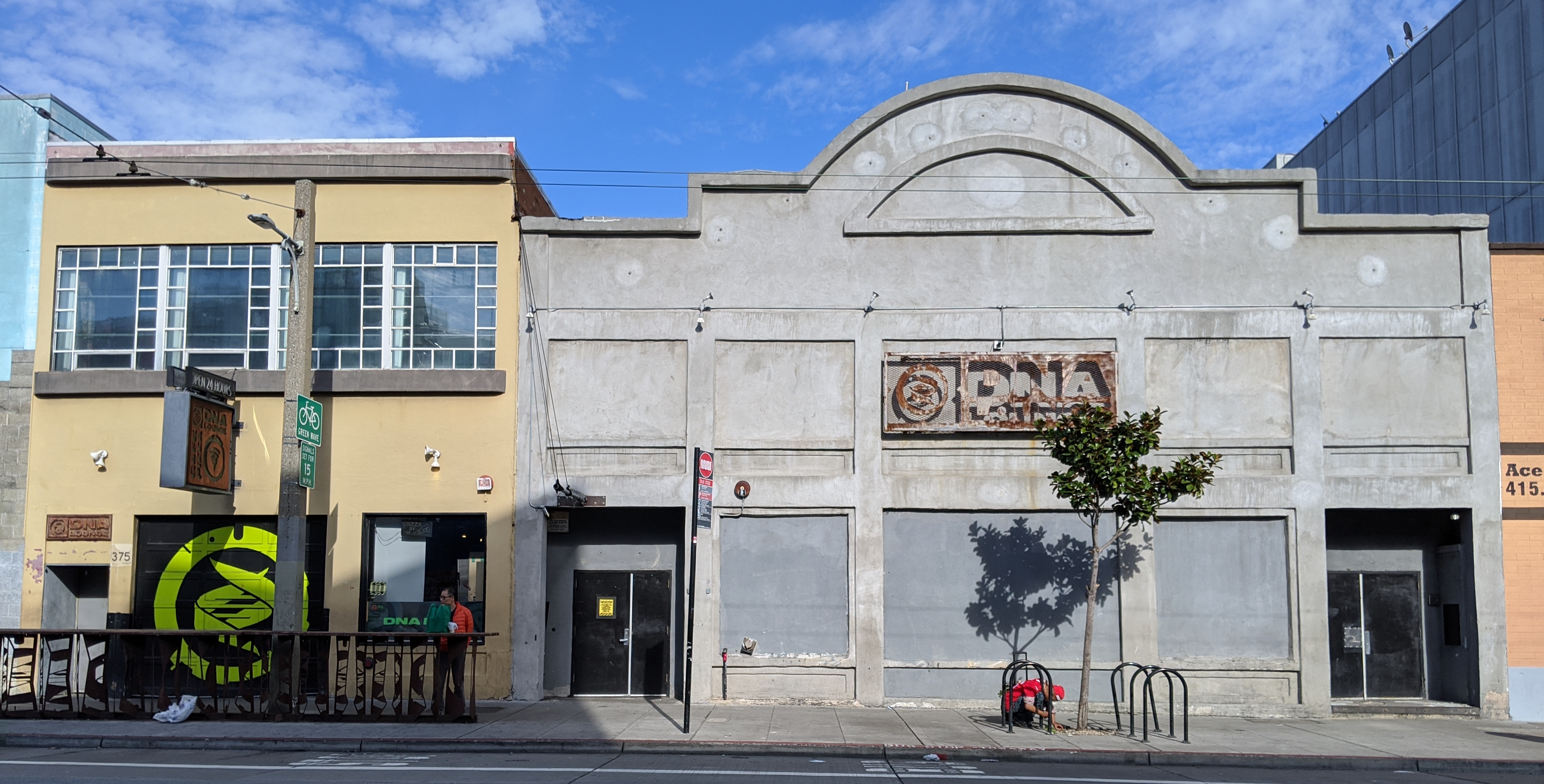
The DNA Lounge building in 2020 (seen across Eleventh Street). DNA Pizza is at the lower left, with Above DNA on its upper floor

The club's main room has a stage at one end and a bar at the other, with a wall-to-wall dance floor in between. Benches and cocktail tables line the walls downstairs. Above this, a balcony looks down on the dance floor and stage from three sides.

Behind the stage on the second floor is a large lounge consisting of two connected rooms, with its own dance floor and sound system.

On the upper floor of the connected pizza restaurant next door is a smaller live music venue with its own stage and a pair of dance floors in two rooms. Known as Above DNA, this space has its own entrance to the street as well as connecting doors to the main room balcony and upstairs lounge. On some nights, the main room and Above DNA operate separately, with different events in each. For larger events, all four rooms are connected together into one large venue. The entire second floor is not wheelchair accessible; there is no elevator.^{[secondary source needed]}

For live shows, the capacity of the main room is around 800, and Above DNA is around 300.

== History ==
The venue first opened for business in 1983 as a leather bar called Chaps, owned by Chuck Slaton.

In 1985 it was purchased by Jim English, Jeff Mason and Brian Raffi who opened for business under the name DNA Lounge on November 22, 1985. The name was rumored to be an acronym for "dancing, not art". Jim English left around 1988 to open Club Townsend.The earliest regular DJs were Ted Cousens, Adam Fisher, Michael Snyder, and Brian Raffi. One of the early doormen was Doc Martin, who later became a popular house music DJ after a residency on Monday nights as a DJ (and spinning a lot at Townsend, thanks to English, as he became a star).

Some nights were genre-specific, with both live bands and DJs. Notable nights and resident DJs included DJs Blackstone (who spun hip hop and rap on Wednesday nights), DJ Pause (who spun hip hop and rap on Monday nights), DJ Damon and DJ Matt (who spun Rock on Tuesdays), and were preceded by Kelly Spencer (who played punk and new wave). Many of DNA's posters and flyers were designed by the San Francisco-based artists Scott Williams and Rex Ray. There were wildly psychedelic, fluorescent murals of strange and twisted monsters with stretched perspectives on the otherwise black downstairs walls and a black and white motif in the upstairs VIP lounge that was painted by celebrated late graffiti artist Keith Haring.

During the late '80s, the DNA offered a black membership card for $10 that offered free entry most nights. Employees got a gold card which allowed up to four guests at no charge, and there was a rumored 'platinum' card that was said to be a free pass to unlimited entry, guests, and drinks. In the early '90s, the club hosted many rave-themed nights with acts including Right Said Fred, the Hardkiss Brothers and Tasti Box, and afterhours events such as Lift- it was an important venue in San Francisco rave history. The DNA Lounge was also one of the few bars in San Francisco that would serve the Flaming Dr Pepper, an ignited drink.

In 1994, the club was purchased by John Schneider, his brother, comedian/actor Rob Schneider (who was not an active partner in club operations), and restaurateur Tim Dale. From 1995 until 1998, the DNA was a popular late-night destination, featuring unpublicized shows by such top pop musicians as Prince and Metallica, and weekend dance parties headlined by retro bands Grooveline and the M-80s. But, starting in 1996, John Schneider had to devote the bulk of his time running their family hotel and resort business. They left the daily operations of the club to subordinates, and it fell into disrepair.

The club was purchased by Jamie Zawinski in 1999. The club was closed for extensive remodeling and soundproofing from April 1999 until it re-opened on Friday, July 13, 2001.

From 2001 through 2009, the club provided several publicly accessible computer terminals (running Fedora). They were eventually removed due to maintenance difficulties, and a belief that the prevalence of internet-enabled phones made them obsolete.

In 2011, Zawinski purchased the pizza restaurant next door to DNA Lounge, renaming it DNA Pizza, and announcing his plans to expand DNA Lounge into that space, combining the two businesses into a single all-ages nightclub, restaurant and cafe. That merger was completed in 2012, and the expanded club debuted on October 23, 2012.

When non-essential San Francisco businesses were forced to suspend operations in early 2020 due to the global COVID-19 pandemic, DNA Lounge continued hosting online-only events via its webcast. The venue announced it would be reopening for in-person events on June 19, 2021. It actually reopened a day earlier, on June 18, 2021, after 465 days of being closed due to the COVID-19 pandemic. On July 31, 2021, DNA Lounge began requiring proof of full vaccination against COVID-19 for entry, and required proof of booster shots as of January 17, 2022 due to the Omicron variant. However, both of these policies were rescinded on April 19, 2022, as the club "surrender[ed] unconditionally to the coronavirus", citing lax policies at other clubs and falling revenue.

=== Conflict with local regulatory agencies ===
During the period that DNA Lounge was closed for remodeling, Zawinski spearheaded a successful grassroots effort to maintain its late-night permits, facing opposition from several neighbors and the SFPD, but was unable to procure an all-ages license. In September 2008, after two and a half years of legal battles, the club's operating permits were successfully modified to allow patrons of all ages, instead of only those 21 years of age or older.

The California Department of Alcoholic Beverage Control (ABC) launched an investigation against the club in 2009, resulting in an accusation of "running a disorderly house injurious to the public welfare and morals", and asking for permanent revocation of the club's liquor license, which would result in the club closing permanently.

The accusations pertain to lewd behavior at certain gay and lesbian events which no longer take place at the club. Members of the community were outraged by the ABC's allegations and the severity of their proposed punishment. Many complained that ABC was unfairly targeting DNA Lounge, and their homosexual clientele in particular, pointing out that the specific allegations are far less "lewd" than the standard behavior at heterosexual strip clubs. ABC has not commented on this accusation. Many have claimed that ABC's punishment is in retaliation to DNA's successful appeal to receive an all-ages license, and that this appears to be part of a larger shift in policy by the ABC to crack down on all-ages music venues.

In April 2009, ABC ruled to revoke DNA Lounge's liquor license. DNA promptly filed an appeal citing insufficient evidence in the ABC's case as well as challenging the constitutionality of ABC's code that pertain to regulating sexual behavior and morality. DNA Lounge remained in business, pending resolution of their appeal, and a legal defense fund soliciting donations was set up to help offset the cost of contesting the decision. On November 10, 2009, a settlement was announced, reducing the revocation of their license down to a 25-day suspension, effective January 4, 2010.

== Awards ==
DNA Lounge won "Best Dance Club" in the San Francisco Bay Guardian's "Best of the Bay" readers' poll in 2008, 2009, 2010, 2011, 2012, 2014, 2016, 2017, 2019, 2020, 2021, 2022, 2024, and 2026, and "Best Bar Staff" in 2011 and 2012. DNA Lounge won "Best Dance Club" in SF Weekly's "Best of SF" readers' poll in 2011, 2013, 2014, 2017, 2018, and "Best Live Music Venue" in 2017. A number of regular DNA Lounge events are perennial winners as well, including Bootie ("Best Party Producers", "Best Dance Party"), Smash-Up Derby ("Best Cover Band"), Death Guild ("Best Weeknight Dance Club", "Best Dance Party"), Hubba Hubba Revue ("Best Burlesque"), Bohemian Carnival ("Best Circus Troupe"), Trannyshack ("Best Drag Show"), Bearracuda ("Best Club for Queer Men") and Fog City Wrestling ("Best Body Slams").

On November 22, 2010, the date of DNA Lounge's 25th anniversary, the San Francisco Board of Supervisors issued a resolution proclaiming that day to be "DNA Lounge Day", "to convey the City's sincere respect for their ability to successfully run an entertainment business for the past 25 years."

On the same day, San Francisco Mayor Gavin Newsom presented the club with a Certificate of Honor, stating that the club "contributes to the rich cultural history of San Francisco's entertainment scene and our beloved historic South of Market District."

On December 11, 2017, the San Francisco Board of Supervisors and San Francisco Small Business Commission granted DNA Lounge Legacy Business status, stating that such businesses are "the bedrock of our communities and a draw for tourists from around the world. Preserving our legacy businesses is critical to maintaining what it is that makes San Francisco a special place."

== Events ==
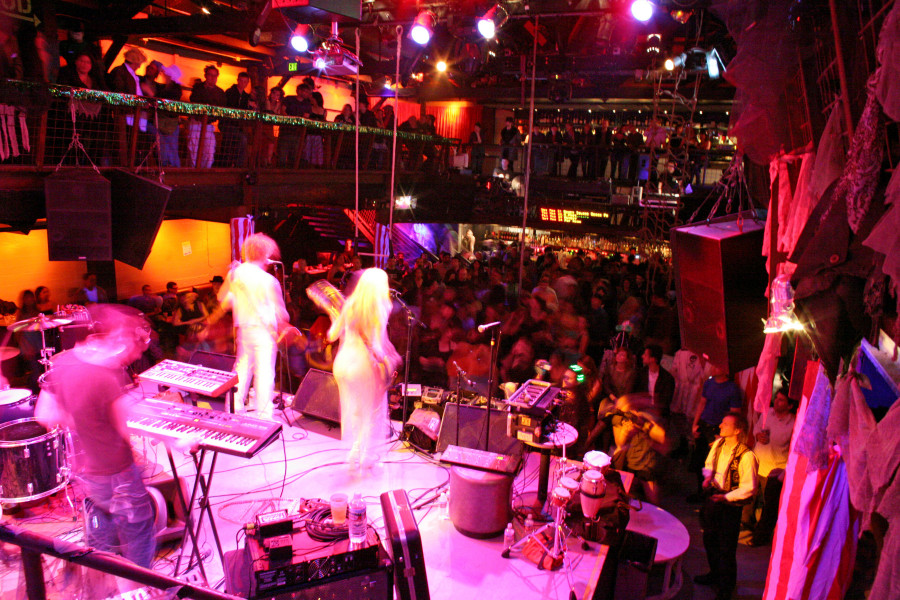
Luxxury at DNA Lounge, March 17, 2007

The space functions as a venue for both live music and regular dance nights.

Popular regular events at DNA Lounge include:

- Bootie, a weekly Saturday all-mashup dance night
- Death Guild, the longest-running weekly gothic/industrial dance night in the USA.
- Hubba Hubba Revue, a weekly burlesque show, featuring classic striptease, vaudeville comedy, variety acts, and live music.
- Mortified, an event where adults read from their most embarrassing adolescent journals.
- Hoodslam, a profane and absurd underground professional wrestling event.
- So Stoked, a dance party featuring hardcore, trance, drum and bass, and other rave music DJs; it is also one of the city's few all ages dance parties (as opposed to 18+).
- Sequence, a weekly 18+ dance party showcasing dubstep and riddim DJs.
- Wasted, an 18+ dance party showcasing trap, bass house and dubstep DJs.
- Acid Rain, a psychedelic dance party featuring both live and DJ performances of psytrance, downtempo, and a range of other dance genres.
- The Cocktail Robotics Grand Challenge, an annual competition for Rube Goldberg-esque robots that create and serve cocktails.
- Dr Sketchy's Anti-Art School, a monthly life-drawing event.

DNA Lounge has also hosted several notable tech-industry events, such as CodeCon (a hacker con), Ignite (a technology conference), and BSidesSF (a computer security conference). The release of Mozilla 1.0 was celebrated there in 2002, and the 10th anniversary of FreeBSD was celebrated there in 2003. Cypress Hill's music video for "Insane in the Brain" was filmed at DNA Lounge in 1993. In the background of some shots can be seen parts of the Keith Haring mural that used to adorn the walls of the upstairs lounge. The title sequence of the SingStar Amped video game was shot at DNA Lounge in 2007.

== Live music ==
DNA Lounge has been well known for both DJ dance nights and live concerts. Since the club was purchased by Zawinski, they have been focusing more on live music, and in 2008 they procured an all-ages liquor license to facilitate this. Live concerts are all ages, and most other events are 18+. Concert highlights since 1985 include:

- Abney Park (2010)
- Afrika Bambaataa (2002, 2004, 2005)
- Agent Orange (1986)
- Alien Sex Fiend (1990)
- Alina Baraz (2015)
- All Shall Perish (2009, 2011, 2013, 2025)
- Anamanaguchi (2009, 2010, 2011)
- Andre Nickatina (2009)
- Anvil (2014, 2016, 2024)
- Aphrodite (2003)
- Arrested Development (1992)
- Bad Manners (2002)
- The Black Dahlia Murder (2015)
- Big Country (2025)
- Black Flag (2024)
- Blessthefall (2014)
- Book of Love (2013, 2015, 2017)
- Borgore (2011)
- Brand New Heavies (1991)
- Brand X (1993)
- Candlemass (2017, 2023)
- Carpenter Brut (2016)
- Celldweller (2003)
- Cherry Poppin' Daddies (1995)
- Chris Isaak (1986, 1987, 1990)
- Chuck Palahniuk (2014)
- Cirith Ungol (2024)
- Clan of Xymox (2015)
- Club Foot Orchestra (1987)
- Comeback Kid (2013)
- Consolidated (1988)
- The Contractions (1995)
- Corey Feldman (2023)
- Counting Crows (1992, 1994, 1995)
- Covenant (2006, 2009, 2012, 2015, 2018, 2023)
- Crash Worship (1998)
- Cypress Hill (1993)
- D.O.A. with Jello Biafra (1990)
- Dark Tranquillity (2014)
- Darkest Hour (2015, 2017)
- Das Racist (2012)
- Death Angel (2004, 2012, 2019)
- The Del Rubio Triplets (1989, 1991, 1992)
- Deedrah (2003)
- Deftones (1996)
- Deicide (2013)
- Desire (2021, 2024)
- Destruction (2014)
- Diana Arbenina and Nochnye Snaipery (2018)
- Digable Planets (2005, 2008)
- Digital Underground (2004, 2005)
- The Dillinger Escape Plan (2013, 2014)
- Dirt Nasty (2014, 2016)
- El Vez (1995)
- EMF (1991)
- Epica (2010)
- Eric Lewis (2009)
- Escape The Fate (2015, 2023)
- Everclear (2015)
- Exciter (2023)
- Exene Cervenka (1996)
- Eyehategod (2009, 2010, 2019, 2023)
- Finntroll (2011)
- Fishbone / Angelo Moore (2006, 2008, 2009, 2010, 2015, 2024)
- The Fixx (2003)
- Fleshgod Apocalypse (2011, 2013, 2016, 2023, 2024)
- Flipper (1987)
- A Flock of Seagulls (1989)
- Foetus Inc. (1990, 1991)
- 4 Non Blondes (1990, 1991, 1992, 1993)
- Front 242 (2005)
- MC Frontalot (2018, 2019)
- Game Theory (1986)
- Garaj Mahal (2001, 2002)
- Gene Loves Jezebel (2016, 2018)
- Genitorturers (2003–2006)
- GMS (2002)
- Goatwhore (2001, 2010, 2015, 2019, 2022, 2024)
- Goblin (2019)
- Godflesh (2014, 2023)
- Goldie (2003, 2004)
- Gost (2015, 2017)
- Grandmaster Flash (2002)
- Green Day (2009)
- Groovie Ghoulies (2005, 2006)
- Gwar (2004)
- GZA (2004)
- Hallucinogen (2001)
- Hanzel und Gretyl (2003, 2010)
- Henry Rollins (1987)
- House of Pain (1992)
- Hypocrisy (2010)
- Incredibly Strange Wrestling (2002–2007)
- Infected Mushroom (2002)
- Information Society (2007–2008)
- Invisibl Skratch Piklz (1993, 1994)
- Jacob Whitesides (2014)
- Jello Biafra (1990, 1996, 2009)
- Jesus Jones (1990, 1991)
- Jim Carroll (1986)
- The Jim Rose Circus (1993, 2009)
- Julian Cope (1991)
- Kero Kero Bonito (2017)
- Kid Ink (2013)
- Killing Joke (2018)
- KMFDM (2002, 2004)
- Korpiklaani (2009, 2011, 2012)
- KRS-One (2003)
- Lebanon Hanover (2013)
- Lee Presson and the Nails (2006–2012)
- Legendary Pink Dots (1995, 2013)
- Lene Lovich (1990)
- Little Big (2019)
- The Limousines (2013, 2014)
- Lords of Acid (2010, 2011, 2025)
- Lydia Lunch (1987, 1996)
- Machine Gun Kelly (2015)
- Marduk (2012)
- Mark Farina (2001–2007 residency)
- Marky Ramone (1999, 2024)
- Marques Wyatt (2002–2007 residency)
- Me First and the Gimme Gimmes (2007, 2012)
- Meat Beat Manifesto (2016)
- Miami Horror (2011)
- Mickey Avalon (2016)
- Midnight Oil (1993)
- Miguel Migs (2001–2008)
- The Misfits (2007)
- Mixmaster Mike (2004)
- The Mutants (1989)
- My Life with the Thrill Kill Kult (2002–2019)
- Nas (1996)
- Neurosis (1995, 2002)
- New Model Army (1993, 2003–2009)
- Nina Hagen (2002–2005)
- Nitzer Ebb (2025)
- Obituary (2012, 2014, 2018)
- Opio (2005, 2008)
- Orchestral Manoeuvres in the Dark (1991)
- Origin (2012)
- Otep (2010, 2013)
- The Pandoras (1989, 1990)
- Peelander-Z (2011, 2012, 2013)
- Pentagram (2009, 2010, 2014, 2016)
- Perturbator (2017)
- Peter Murphy (2015)
- The Phenomenauts (2004–2012)
- Phish (1991, 1994)
- Pig Destroyer (2015)
- Pigface (2001, 2003, 2005)
- Prayers (2023)
- Primus (1988, 1991)
- Prince (1993, 1997, 2013)
- The Prodigy (1991, 1992)
- Psychic TV (1986, 2004)
- Q-Bert (2003, 2005)
- Reverend Horton Heat (1996)
- Revolting Cocks (2016)
- Rhapsody of Fire (2023)
- Richie Hawtin (2015)
- The Roots (1995)
- Rotting Christ (2011, 2023)
- Run-D.M.C. (1996)
- Sean Paul (2005)
- Sepultura (2012)
- Shaggy 2 Dope (2023, 2024)
- She Past Away (2021, 2023)
- Shonen Knife (2016)
- Skeletonwitch (2007, 2014, 2016, 2018)
- Sorrow (2004)
- Space Tribe (2003, 2004)
- Spin Doctors (1991)
- Spinderella (2003)
- Steel Pole Bath Tub (2002)
- Stereo MCs (1991)
- Strung Out (2015, 2016)
- S.U.N. Project (2002)
- Suffocation (2014, 2022, 2023)
- Swans (1992)
- Swingin' Utters (2002, 2015)
- Talib Kweli (2002)
- Tesseract (2014, 2015)
- Tim Finn (1989)
- Tricot (2015)
- Turisas (2012)
- 2 Live Crew (1990)
- underscores (2026)
- Vader (2009, 2010, 2023, 2024)
- Venom (2016)
- Venom Inc. (2016, 2023)
- Village People (1996)
- VNV Nation (1999, 2001, 2005, 2010)
- Voltaire (2005)
- W.A.S.P. (2004)
- Weezer (2018)
- Wind Rose (2023, 2024)
- Wintersun (2013)
- Xerox (2003)
- Z-Trip (2003)
