= Scottish Rite Masonic Center (San Francisco) =

Coordinates: 37.73524°N 122.47465°W

The Scottish Rite Masonic Center in San Francisco, California is the meeting hall of a local Valley (chapter) of the Scottish Rite, as well as several local Masonic lodges.
