= A&D Company =

Tokyo, Japan based manufacturer of measurement equipment

A&D Company, Limited

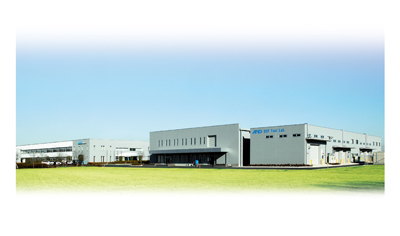
- Type: Corporation TYO: 7745
- Industry: Medical equipment; Laboratory equipment
- Founded: May 6, 1977; 49 years ago
- Founder: Hikaru Furukawa (古川 陽)
- Headquarters: 3-23-14, Higashi-Ikebukuro, Toshima-ku 170-0013, Tokyo, Japan
- Number of locations: 22 subsidiaries as of March 2018
- Area served: Worldwide
- Key people: Yasunobu Morishima (森島 泰信) (President CEO)
- Revenue: \44,120,000,000 as of March 2018
- Operating income: \2,378,000,000 as of March 2018
- Net income: \1,845,000,000 as of March 2018
- Total assets: \47,087,000,000 as of March 2018
- Total equity: \15,939,000,000 as of March 2018
- Number of employees: 2,557 as of March 2018
- Subsidiaries: A&D Russia; A&D Engineering; A&D Instruments etc
- Website: aandd.jp

A&D Company, Limited (株式会社エー・アンド・デイ) is a Japanese company.

The company headquartered in Tokyo, Japan manufacturer of measurement equipment such as digital blood pressure monitors, scales for medical and home use, ultrasonic nebulizers, as well as analog-to-digital and digital-to-analog converters for semiconductor manufacturing equipment and electron guns. "A&D" stands for "analog and digital" and is represented without any spaces (i.e. "A&D" as opposed to "A & D".)

It was founded in 1977 by a group of 13 engineers who left Takeda Riken Industry Co., Ltd. (currently Advantest) in Japan and was first listed on the Tokyo Stock Exchange in March 2006 as symbol 7745.
