= Mashup (music) =

Composition blending prerecorded tracks

- Other names: Mesh, mash up, mash-up, blend, bootleg, bastard pop
- Stylistic origins: Pop; rock; electronic
- Cultural origins: Late 1990s, 2000s; Europe, North America
- Derivative forms: Sampling; sound collage; remix

Regional scenes
- United Kingdom; United States; Germany; France; Australia; Norway; Netherlands; Switzerland; Sweden; Indonesia; Canada; India; Belgium; Austria; Brazil; Italy; Japan; Russia

A mashup (also mesh, mash up, mash-up, blend, bastard pop or bootleg) is a creative work, usually a song, created by blending two or more pre-recorded songs, typically by superimposing the vocal track of one song seamlessly over the instrumental track of another and changing the tempo and key where necessary. Such works are considered "transformative" of original content and in the United States they may find protection from copyright claims under the "fair use" doctrine of copyright law.

== History ==
The 1967 Harry Nilsson album Pandemonium Shadow Show features what is nominally a cover of the Beatles' "You Can't Do That" but actually introduced the "mashup" to studio-recording. Nilsson's recording of "You Can't Do That" mashes his own vocal recreations of more than a dozen Beatles songs into this track. Nilsson conceived the combining of many overlaying songs into one track after he played a chord on his guitar and realized how many Beatles songs it could apply to. This recording has led some to describe Harry Nilsson as the inventor of the mashup. Other recordings regarded as early examples of, or forerunners to, the mashup include Buchanan and Goodman's "The Flying Saucer" (1956), Marshall McLuhan's The Medium Is the Massage (1967), the John Benson Brooks Trio's Avant Slant (1968), Grandmaster Flash's "The Adventures of Grandmaster Flash on the Wheels of Steel" (1981), Paul McCartney's "Tug of Peace" (1983), the "Hip Hop Mix" of Climie Fisher's "Rise to the Occasion" (1987), Jive Bunny and the Mastermixers' Jive Bunny: The Album (1989) and Coldcut's Journeys by DJ: 70 Minutes of Madness (1995).

Although described as a medley in its title, "Do It Again Medley with Billie Jean" by Italian music project Club House could be described as one of the first ever commercially released mashups in 1983. The song combines elements of "Do It Again", a 1973 top 10 hit in the US and Canada by Steely Dan, with Michael Jackson's number one hit from earlier in the year, "Billie Jean". It reached number 11 in the UK, and the top 10 in Belgium, Ireland and the Netherlands.

Another early mashup appeared in 1985, when the Tubes released their studio album, Love Bomb. The second side of the album contained the track "Theme from a Wooly Place", which combined the tunes "Wooly Bully" in one channel and "Theme from A Summer Place" in the other.

In 1990, Norman Cook reached number one in the UK Singles Chart with his act Beats International with "Dub Be Good to Me", essentially a mashup of re-recorded vocals of the SOS Band's "Just Be Good to Me" with the Clash's "The Guns of Brixton", making it the first mashup to achieve significant mainstream success.

The 1990, John Zorn album Naked City features a version of Ornette Coleman's "Lonely Woman" set over the bassline of Roy Orbison's "Pretty Woman".

In 1994, the experimental band Evolution Control Committee released what many consider to be the first modern mashup tracks on their hand-made cassette album, Gunderphonic. These "Whipped Cream Mixes" combined a pair of Public Enemy a cappellas with instrumentals by Herb Alpert and the Tijuana Brass. First released on home-made cassettes in early 1994, it was pressed on 7" vinyl in 1996 by Eerie Materials. Thanks to radio play by BBC Radio One DJ John Peel in 1998, the single was re-released in 1999 by Pickled Egg Records in the UK. This UK exposure directly predated the burgeoning mashup scene in the UK. According to Neil Strauss in The New York Times, "many musical observers trace the official beginnings of the British bootleg scene to The Evolution Control Committee, which in 1993 mixed a Public Enemy a cappella with music by Herb Alpert."

Pre-empting the rise of the mashup in the 2000s, German trance act Fragma reached number one in the UK and the top 10 in Australia and across Europe with "Toca's Miracle", a mashup of their previous single "Toca Me" and Coco Star's 1996 single "I Need a Miracle", initially created by British DJ Vimto in 1999.

The mashup movement gained momentum again in 2001 with the release of the 2 Many DJs album As Heard on Radio Soulwax Pt. 2 by Soulwax's Dewaele brothers, which combined 45 different tracks; the same year a remix of Christina Aguilera's "Genie in a Bottle" was also released by Freelance Hellraiser, which coupled Aguilera's vocals with the guitar track of "Hard to Explain" by New York's the Strokes, in a piece called "A Stroke of Genie-us".

In 2001, English producer Richard X had created a bootleg mashup of Adina Howard's "Freak Like Me" and Tubeway Army's "Are "Friends" Electric?", titled "We Don't Give a Damn About Our Friends", which became a successful underground dance track under his alias Girls on Top. He could not get permission to use the original vocals to release the mashup commercially, so he enlisted the English girl group Sugababes to re-record the vocals. It was released in April 2002, giving the group their first UK number one single, and drawing further recognition, acclaim and mainstream success for the mashup genre. Richard X had continued success with two more mashups reaching the UK top 10: "Being Nobody" (number 3), with pop group Liberty X combining vocals of Chaka Khan and Rufus's "Ain't Nobody" with the Human League's "Being Boiled", and "Finest Dreams" (number 8), featuring American vocalist Kelis singing the vocals from the SOS Band's "The Finest" over an instrumental of the Human League's "The Things That Dreams Are Made Of".

At the 2002 Brit Awards held on 20 February 2002, Australian pop singer Kylie Minogue performed a mash-up version of her number one hit "Can't Get You Out of My Head", combined with New Order's song "Blue Monday". The live performance is cited as one of the first by a mainstream recording artist to utilise a mashup, and was ranked at number 40 on The Guardian's 2011 list of 50 Key Events in the History of Dance Music. The mashup, titled "Can't Get Blue Monday Out of My Head", was later released as the B-side to "Love at First Sight" and was included on Minogue's 2008 remix album Boombox. In the years that followed, mash-ups became more widely used by major artists in their live performances, particularly to update previous material to meld with the themes and sounds of their more recent work. For example, on her 2006 Confessions Tour, Madonna incorporated elements of the Trammps's "Disco Inferno" in the performance of her 2000 hit "Music", to assist the song in blending in with the tour's disco theme. On her 2008 Sticky & Sweet Tour, she performed a mash-up of her 1990 hit "Vogue" with the instrumental of her recent single "4 Minutes", to update it with the more urban sound of her Hard Candy album.

In August 2003, Madonna's single "Hollywood" was remixed with "Into the Groove" and performed with Missy Elliott under the title "Into the Hollywood Groove" as part of a promotional campaign for clothing retailer GAP, prompting criticism for exploiting the underground culture of the mash-up for commercial gain.

Launched in San Francisco in 2003, Bootie was the first recurring club night in the United States dedicated solely to the burgeoning art form of the bootleg mashup, and as of 2019 hosted monthly parties in cities around the globe, including Los Angeles, Paris, Boston, Munich, and New York City. The party's slogan, "Music for the A.D.D. Generation" also inspired the creation of "A.D.D", Israel's first mashup-dedicated party. The Best of Bootie mashup compilation series is produced by Bootie creators A Plus D. Released every December since 2005, the compilations are annual Internet sensations, with each album requiring 5,000 GB+ of download bandwidth.

Even though mashups mostly remained underground and barely got noticed aside from a few exceptions (notable examples include DJ Cummerbund and Bill McClintock), people have never stopped remixing other artists' music without getting their prior agreement. It's been increasingly difficult to get noticed in the music industry due to a combination of relative obscurity and an increasing difficulty in keeping them available online due to automatic copyright detection (through Content ID) and cease and desist orders from the original artists.

== Live mashups ==
DJs can create mashups during live performances by selectively mixing song elements such as instruments, vocals, and drums from multiple tracks. This can be done with music released in a stem format or with music processed through stem separation. DJ software with stem separation capability includes Rekordbox, Serato DJ, VirtualDJ, Djay, Traktor, and Engine DJ.

== Video games ==
DJ Hero is a 2009 rhythm video game developed by Activision that includes over 90 pre-made mashups, where the player scores points by hitting notes on the turntable controller.

Fuser is a 2020 video game developed by Harmonix that allows the player to create mashups of over 100 songs, using four instrument stems from the master recording.

In December 2023, Fortnite introduced a new game mode titled Fortnite Festival. In the Jam Stage and Fortnite Battle Royale, players can make mashups of over 100 songs.

== See also ==
- Mashup (culture)
- Mashup (video)
- Sampling
- Interpolation
- Sound collage
- Plunderphonics
- WhoSampled
- Parody music
- Quodlibet
- Pastiche
- "One Song to the Tune of Another"
- SiIvaGunner
