= Closer =

Closer or Closers may refer to:

== Film and television ==
- Closer (2000 film), a documentary by Tina Gharavi
- Closer (2004 film), a 2004 adaptation of Patrick Marber's play (see below), directed by Mike Nichols
- The Closer, a 1990 movie, starring Danny Aiello, based on the play Wheelbarrow Closers
- Closer (TV series), a Canadian music program
- The Closer (1998 TV series), an American sitcom
- The Closer, a 2000s American drama series
- "The Closer" (CSI: NY), an episode of CSI: NY
- The Closer (2021 film), a 2021 television stand-up comedy special by Dave Chappelle

== Literature ==
- Closer (novel), by Roderick Gordon
- The Closers, a novel by Michael Connelly
- Closer, a novel by Dennis Cooper
- Closer, a graphic novel by Antony Johnston and Mike Norton
- Closer (play), 1997, by Patrick Marber
- "Closer", a short story by Greg Egan
- "Closer", a short story by David Malouf from his collection Dream Stuff

== Music ==
=== Bands ===
- Closer (band), a rock band from New York City

=== Albums ===
- Closer (Better Than Ezra album), and the title song, 2001
- Closer (Christopher album), 2016
- Closer (Goapele album), and the title song, 2001
- Closer (Josh Groban album), 2003
- Closer (Joy Division album), 1980
- Closer (Melba Moore album), and the title song, 1980
- Closer (Mike Stud album), and the title song, 2014
- Closer (Noisia album), 2022
- Closer (Paul Bley album), 1966
- Closer (Plastikman album), 2003
- Closer (Presence album), 2014
- Closer (Shayne Ward album), 2015
- Closer (Shawn McDonald album), 2011
- Closer (Susan Ashton album), 1999
- Closer (Ty album), 2006
- Closer (Jars of Clay EP), and the title song, 2008
- Closer (Kane Brown EP), and the title song, 2015
- Closer (Oh My Girl EP), and the title song, 2015
- Closer: The Best of Sarah McLachlan, 2008
- Closer, by David Sanborn, 2005
- Closer, by Brandon Lake, 2016
- The Closers, by SonReal and Rich Kidd 2012

=== Songs ===
- "Closer" (Capone-N-Noreaga song), 1997, from The War Report
- "Closer" (The Chainsmokers song) ft. Halsey, 2016
- "Closer" (Corinne Bailey Rae song), 2010, from The Sea
- "Closer" (The Corrs song), 1997
- "Closer" (Jars of Clay song), 2008
- "Closer" (Joe Inoue song), from Me! Me! Me!, 2008
- "Closer" (Mandy Capristo song), 2012, from Grace
- "Closer" (Maverick City Music song), 2020, from Maverick City, Vol. 3 Pt. 2
- "Closer" (Michael Paynter song), 2008
- "Closer" (Ne-Yo song), 2008, from Year of the Gentleman
- "Closer" (Nine Inch Nails song), 1994, from The Downward Spiral
- "Closer" (Saweetie song), 2022, from Pretty Bitch Music
- "Closer" (Six60 song), 2017, from Six60 EP
- "Closer" (Slinkee Minx song), 2004
- "Closer" (Tegan and Sara song), 2012
- "Closer" (Travis song), 2007, from The Boy with No Name
- "Closer/Sweet Dreams", by Nylon, 2006
- "Closer", by Aerosmith from Music from Another Dimension!
- "Closer", by Anathema from A Natural Disaster
- "Closer", by Anberlin from Dark Is the Way, Light Is a Place
- "Closer", by Au5
- "Closer", by Baboon from We Sing and Play
- "Closer", by Better Than Ezra from Closer
- "Closer", by Chris Brown from 11:11
- "Closer", by Dave Gahan, released as a B-side on the single "I Need You"
- "Closer", by deadmau5 from Album Title Goes Here
- "Closer", by Dido from Life for Rent, where it is an unlisted bonus track
- "Closer", by Dirty Vegas from One
- "Closer", by Drake from Comeback Season
- "Closer", by Earshot from The Silver Lining
- "Closer", by the Firm from The Firm
- "Closer", by FKA Twigs from LP1
- "Closer", by Fool's Garden from 25 Miles to Kissimmee
- "Closer", by Girls' Generation from Forever 1
- "Closer", by the Gracious Few from The Gracious Few
- "Closer", by Jack River from Stranger Heart
- "Closer", by Jeff Black from Tin Lily
- "Closer", by Jeremy Lee, 2023
- "Closer", by Joshua Radin from We Were Here
- "Closer", by Kings of Leon from Only by the Night
- "Closer", by the Kooks from 10 Tracks to Echo in the Dark (2022)
- "Closer", by Kylie Minogue from Aphrodite
- "Closer", by Lacuna Coil from Karmacode
- "Closer", by Laleh from Prinsessor
- "Closer", by Lapush from Modern Blues
- "Closer", by Lemaitre from 1749
- "Closer", by Lemon Jelly from Lost Horizons
- "Closer", by Mario from Closer to Mars
- "Closer", by Melanie Chisholm from Northern Star
- "Closer", by Mike Oldfield from Light + Shade
- "Closer", by Mike Stud from Closer
- "Closer", by Mudvayne from their eponymous album
- "Closer", by Nick Jonas from his self-titled album
- "Closer", by Oh My Girl from Closer EP
- "Closer", by Philmont from The Transition EP
- "Closer", by Quasimoto from The Further Adventures of Lord Quas
- "Closer", by Rae Morris from Unguarded
- "Closer", by Rolo Tomassi from Where Myth Becomes Memory
- "Closer", by Sarah Brightman from Dreamchaser
- "Closer", by Sea Girls from Open Up Your Head
- "Closer", by Shalamar from The Look
- "Closer", by Sidewalk Prophets and Tamela Mann from Something Different
- "Closer", by Skylar Grey from Natural Causes
- "Closer", by Sugar Ray from Music for Cougars
- "Closer", by Super Junior from The Renaissance
- "Closer", by Tonight Alive
- "Closer", by the Urge from Master of Styles
- "Closer", by Waterparks from Intellectual Property
- "Closer", by Way Out West from Tuesday Maybe
- "Closer", by Westlife from Gravity
- "The Closer", by VIXX from Kratos

== Other uses ==
- Closer (magazine), a UK/French women's magazine published by Bauer Media Group
- Closers, a 2014 MMORPG
- Closer (baseball), a specialized relief pitcher
- Kevin Harvick (born 1975), an American racecar driver nicknamed "The Closer"

== See also ==
- Close (disambiguation)
- Closer to You (disambiguation)
