= Anti World Tour =

2016 concert tour by Rihanna

- Tour by Rihanna
- Promotional poster for the tour
- Associated album: Anti
- Start date: March 12, 2016
- End date: November 27, 2016
- Legs: 3
- No. of shows: 75
- Supporting acts: Travis Scott; Big Sean; DJ Mustard; Bibi Bourelly; R3hab; Delia
- Box office: $110 million ($147.57 in 2025 dollars)

Rihanna concert chronology
- The Monster Tour (2014); Anti World Tour (2016); ...

The Anti World Tour (stylized as ANTI World Tour) was the seventh concert tour by Barbadian singer Rihanna, in support of her eighth studio album, Anti (2016). The tour was announced on November 15, 2015, and began on March 12, 2016, in Jacksonville and ended on November 27, 2016, in Abu Dhabi, United Arab Emirates.

The show was met with acclaim from music critics who praised Rihanna's stage presence and confidence. Commercially, the tour grossed more than $110 million (USD) according to Billboard Boxscore.

== Background ==
After the release of her seventh studio album, Unapologetic, (2012) and her fifth concert tour, the Diamonds World Tour, Rihanna went on a hiatus. Between 2005 and 2012, Rihanna released or re-released at least one album a year. However, in 2013, Rihanna took a step back from music and did not release a new album that year or the following. Instead Rihanna opted to take part in other endeavors, starring in a 3D animated film entitled Home, alongside Jim Parsons, Steve Martin and Jennifer Lopez, as well as executively producing its accompanying soundtrack.

In November 2015, it was announced that Rihanna had signed a $25 million contract with Samsung to not only promote Samsung's Galaxy line of products, but to also sponsor the release of Anti and its supporting tour. On November 23, 2015, Rihanna announced she would be embarking on "The Anti World Tour". The Samsung-sponsored tour began in March 2016, with Travis Scott supporting in North America, and Big Sean and DJ Mustard supporting at selected European dates.

== Critical reception ==
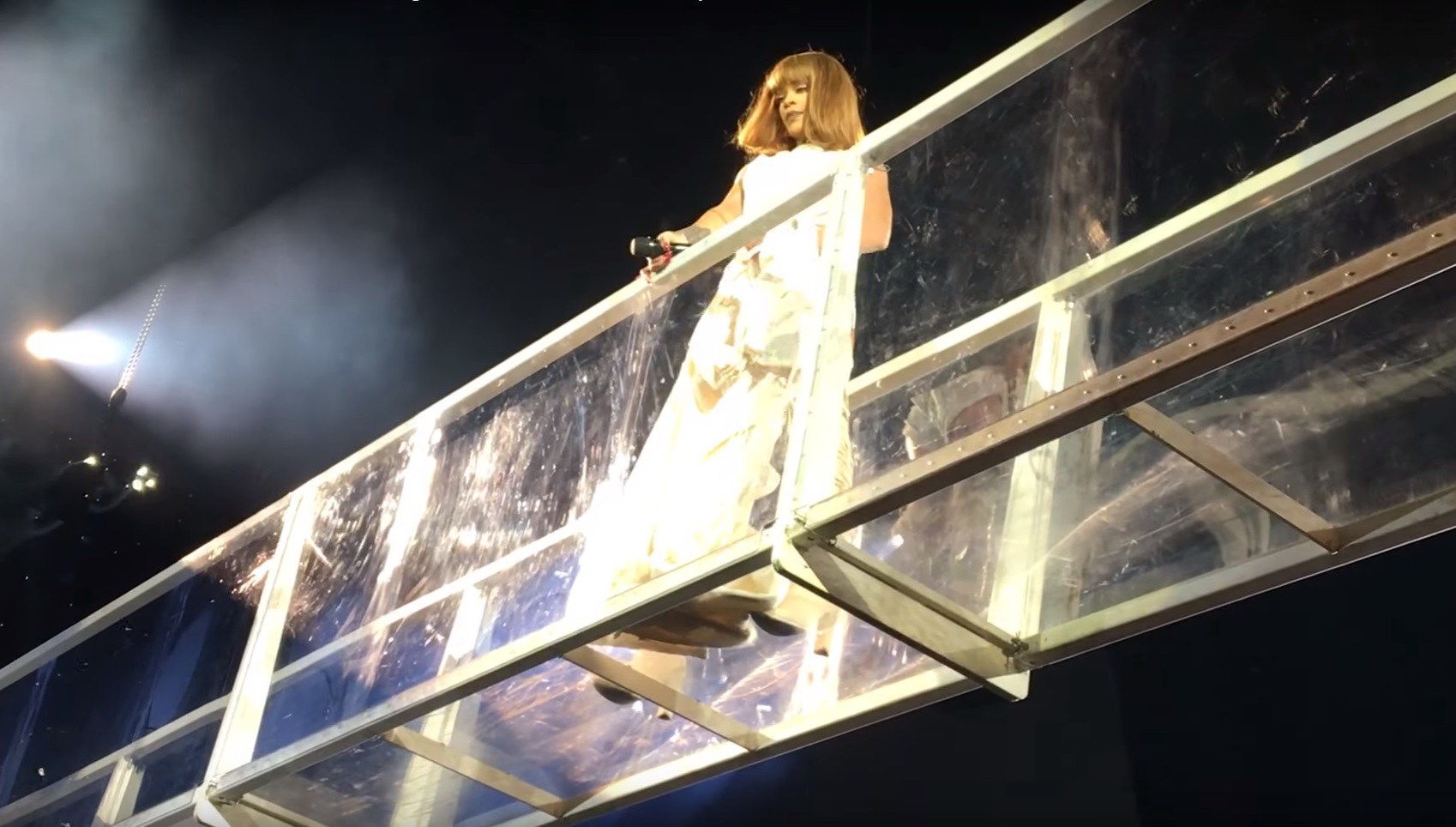
Rihanna in Warsaw on August 5, 2016

=== North America ===
In a review for The New York Times, Jon Caramanica stated that Rihanna was at her "most confident" and "the most present she's ever been onstage", calling her dancing "casual" and that she "appeared to be finding joy in singing — when she was doing it." Reviewing the Los Angeles concert, Latifah Muhammad from VIBE described the tour as a "randomly epic road trip."

=== Europe ===
Ed Power from The Telegraph gave the Dublin concert four stars, writing that the tour "didn't waste time on embellishments and instead delivered full-strength shots of sass and escapism." The London concert also received four stars from The Guardian, where Michael Cragg praised the singer's "unshakeable Rihanna-ness; that perfect pop voice, the undeniable presence, that couldn't-give-a-shit attitude."

== Set list ==
This set list is representative of the show in Jacksonville on March 12, 2016. It is not representative of all concerts for the duration of the tour.

1. "Stay"
2. "Love the Way You Lie (Part II)"
3. "Woo"
4. "Sex with Me"
5. "Birthday Cake" / "Pour It Up" / "Numb"
6. "Bitch Better Have My Money"
7. "Pose"
8. "Goodnight Gotham" (interlude)
9. "Consideration"
10. "Live Your Life" / "Run This Town" / "All of the Lights"
11. "Umbrella"
12. "Desperado"
13. "Man Down" (remix)
14. "Rude Boy"
15. "Work"
16. "Take Care" / "We Found Love" / "How Deep is Your Love"
17. "Where Have You Been"
18. "Talk That Talk" (interlude)
19. "Needed Me"
20. "Same Ol' Mistakes"
21. "Diamonds"
22. "FourFiveSeconds"

Encore

22. "Love on the Brain"
23. "Kiss It Better"

Notes

- During the shows in Miami and Manchester, and the second shows in Toronto and Inglewood, Drake joined Rihanna on stage during "Work".
- During the show in Milan, Rihanna did not perform "FourFiveSeconds" and "Kiss It Better", due to a summer storm which caused a late start of the concert.
- During the second Inglewood concert, Rihanna performed “Stay”, “Love The Way You Lie (Pt. II), “Woo” and “Sex With Me” on the main stage due to technical issues.

== Tour dates ==
List of concerts
Date (2016)	City	Country	Venue	Opening acts	Attendance	Revenue
March 12	Jacksonville	United States	Jacksonville Veterans Memorial Arena	Travis Scott	10,916 / 11,253 (97%)	$880,516
March 13	Tampa	United States	Amalie Arena	Travis Scott	12,079 / 12,905 (94%)	$973,994
March 15	Miami	United States	American Airlines Arena	Travis Scott	11,792 / 12,301 (96%)	$1,196,069
March 18	Nashville	United States	Bridgestone Arena	Travis Scott	15,254 / 15,287 (99%)	$1,590,047
March 19	Cincinnati	United States	U.S. Bank Arena	Travis Scott	10,773 / 11,089 (97%)	$890,872
March 20	Charlotte	United States	Time Warner Cable Arena	Travis Scott	13,811 / 14,174 (97%)	$948,212
March 22	Washington, D.C.	United States	Verizon Center	Travis Scott	12,913 / 13,287 (97%)	$1,539,808
March 23	Buffalo	United States	First Niagara Center	Travis Scott	12,788 / 13,215 (97%)	$983,393
March 24	Auburn Hills	United States	The Palace of Auburn Hills	Travis Scott	11,748 / 12,482 (94%)	$944,183
March 26	Hartford	United States	XL Center	Travis Scott	10,962 / 11,104 (99%)	$853,354
March 27	Brooklyn	United States	Barclays Center	Travis Scott	28,010 / 28,010 (100%)	$2,906,512
March 30	Brooklyn	United States	Barclays Center	Travis Scott	28,010 / 28,010 (100%)	$2,906,512
April 2	Newark	United States	Prudential Center	Travis Scott	12,992 / 12,992 (100%)	$1,471,474
April 3	Philadelphia	United States	Wells Fargo Center	Travis Scott	12,994 / 13,361 (97%)	$1,652,596
April 5	Quebec City	Canada	Videotron Centre	Travis Scott	—N/a	—N/a
April 6	Montreal	Canada	Bell Centre	Travis Scott	21,737 / 22,296 (97%)	$2,432,620
April 7	Montreal	Canada	Bell Centre	Travis Scott	21,737 / 22,296 (97%)	$2,432,620
April 9	Baltimore	United States	Royal Farms Arena	Travis Scott	11,356 / 11,810 (96%)	$848,704
April 10	Boston	United States	TD Garden	Travis Scott	12,295 / 12,589 (98%)	$1,180,615
April 13	Toronto	Canada	Air Canada Centre	Travis Scott	26,288 / 26,288 (100%)	$2,102,944
April 14	Toronto	Canada	Air Canada Centre	Travis Scott	26,288 / 26,288 (100%)	$2,102,944
April 15	Chicago	United States	United Center	Travis Scott	13,515 / 19,625 (69%)	$1,330,995
April 18	Winnipeg	Canada	MTS Centre	Travis Scott	—N/a	—N/a
April 20	Edmonton	Canada	Northlands Coliseum	Travis Scott	10,200 / 10,835 (94%)	$730,774
April 21	Calgary	Canada	Scotiabank Saddledome	Travis Scott	—N/a	—N/a
April 23	Vancouver	Canada	Rogers Arena	Travis Scott	14,220 / 14,220 (100%)	$1,080,064
April 24	Seattle	United States	KeyArena	Travis Scott	9,641 / 10,620 (91%)	$900,660
April 27	Salt Lake City	United States	Vivint Smart Home Arena	Travis Scott	9,086 / 21,049 (43%)	$584,709
April 29	Las Vegas	United States	Mandalay Bay Events Center	Travis Scott	15,109 / 15,862 (99%)	$1,648,489
April 30	Las Vegas	United States	Mandalay Bay Events Center	Travis Scott	—N/a	—N/a
May 1 (Note: The concert of May 1, 2016 at the Talking Stick Resort Arena in Phoenix was originally scheduled to take place on March 1, but was postponed due to "production delays".)	Phoenix	United States	Talking Stick Resort Arena	Travis Scott	9,503 / 11,692 (81%)	$833,279
May 3	Inglewood	United States	The Forum	Travis Scott	25,111 / 25,111 (100%)	$2,488,465
May 4	Inglewood	United States	The Forum	Travis Scott	25,111 / 25,111 (100%)	$2,488,465
May 6 (Note: The concert of May 6, 2016, at SAP Center in San Jose was originally scheduled to take place on February 28, but was postponed due to "production delays".)	San Jose	United States	SAP Center	Travis Scott	10,285 / 11,392 (90%)	$1,050,724
May 7	Oakland	United States	Oracle Arena	Travis Scott	11,409 / 11,440 (99%)	$1,263,414
May 9 (Note: The concert of May 9, 2016 at Viejas Arena in San Diego was originally scheduled to take place on February 26, but was postponed due to "production delays".)	San Diego	United States	Viejas Arena	Travis Scott	8,461 / 10,304 (82%)	$812,817
May 13 (Note: The concert of May 13, 2016 at the American Airlines Center in Dallas was originally scheduled to take place on March 6, but was postponed due to "production delays".)	Dallas	United States	American Airlines Center	Travis Scott	13,257 / 13,257 (100%)	$1,134,952
May 14 (Note: The concert of May 14, 2016 at the Frank Erwin Center in Austin was originally scheduled to take place on March 4, but was postponed due to "production delays".)	Austin	United States	Frank Erwin Center	Travis Scott	10,422 / 10,422 (100%)	$917,707
May 15 (Note: The concert of May 15, 2016 at the Toyota Center in Houston was originally scheduled to take place on March 5, but was postponed due to "production delays".)	Houston	United States	Toyota Center	Travis Scott	10,927 / 11,105 (98%)	$1,436,742
May 17 (Note: The concert of May 17, 2016 at Smoothie King Center in New Orleans was originally scheduled to take place on March 8, but was postponed due to "production delays".)	New Orleans	United States	Smoothie King Center	Travis Scott	10,247 / 12,088 (85%)	$829,499
May 18 (Note: The concert of May 18, 2016 at the Philips Arena in Atlanta was originally scheduled to take place on March 9, but was postponed due to "production delays".)	Atlanta	United States	Philips Arena	Travis Scott	14,397 / 14,397 (100%)	$1,249,535
June 17 (Note: The concert of June 17, 2016 at the Amsterdam Arena in Amsterdam was originally scheduled to take place on June 11.)	Amsterdam	Netherlands	Amsterdam Arena	Big Sean; DJ Mustard	50,513 / 50,932 (99%)	$3,525,469
June 21	Dublin	Ireland	Aviva Stadium	Big Sean; DJ Mustard	29,017 / 30,000 (97%)	$2,718,888
June 24	London	England	Wembley Stadium	Big Sean; DJ Mustard	—N/a	—N/a
June 25 (Note: The concert of June 25, 2016 at the Ricoh Arena in Coventry was originally scheduled to take place on June 14.)	Coventry	England	Ricoh Arena	Big Sean; DJ Mustard	—N/a	—N/a
June 27	Glasgow	Scotland	Hampden Park	—N/a	22,496 / 23,058 (98%)	$1,874,229
June 29	Manchester	England	Emirates Old Trafford	—N/a	—N/a	—N/a
July 2	Oslo	Norway	Telenor Arena	—N/a	—N/a	—N/a
July 4	Stockholm	Sweden	Tele2 Arena	—N/a	34,956 / 35,987 (97%)	$2,543,042
July 7	Copenhagen	Denmark	Refshale Island	—N/a	—N/a	—N/a
July 9	Hamburg	Germany	Volksparkstadion	Big Sean; DJ Mustard; Bibi Bourelly	—N/a	—N/a
July 11	Turin	Italy	Pala Alpitour	—N/a	—N/a	—N/a
July 13	Milan	Italy	San Siro	—N/a	—N/a	—N/a
July 17	Frankfurt	Germany	Commerzbank-Arena	—N/a	—N/a	—N/a
July 19	Lyon	France	Stade des Lumières	Big Sean; DJ Mustard	—N/a	—N/a
July 21	Barcelona	Spain	Palau Sant Jordi	Big Sean; DJ Mustard	—N/a	—N/a
July 23	Lille	France	Stade Pierre-Mauroy	Big Sean; DJ Mustard	—N/a	—N/a
July 26 (Note: The concert of July 26, 2016 at the O_{2} Arena in Prague was originally scheduled to take place on July 26 at the Eden Arena and then July 25, 2016 at O_{2} Arena.)	Prague	Czech Republic	O_{2} Arena	Big Sean; DJ Mustard	—N/a	—N/a
July 28	Cologne	Germany	RheinEnergieStadion	Big Sean; DJ Mustard; Bibi Bourelly	—N/a	—N/a
July 30	Saint-Denis	France	Stade de France	Big Sean; DJ Mustard	—N/a	—N/a
August 2	Malmö	Sweden	Malmö Arena	Big Sean; DJ Mustard	—N/a	—N/a
August 3 (Note: The concert of August 3, 2016 in Skanderborg, Denmark at Smukkeste Festival Grounds is a part of the Skanderborg Festival.)	Skanderborg	Denmark	Smukkeste Festival Grounds	—N/a	—N/a	—N/a
August 5	Warsaw	Poland	PGE Narodowy	Big Sean; Mo Beatz	—N/a	—N/a
August 7	Munich	Germany	Olympiastadion	Big Sean; Alan Walker; Bibi Bourelly	—N/a	—N/a
August 9 (Note: The concert of August 9, 2016 at the Wiener Stadthalle in Vienna was originally scheduled to take place on August 10 at the Ernst Happel Stadion in Vienna.)	Vienna	Austria	Wiener Stadthalle	Big Sean; R3hab	—N/a	—N/a
August 11 (Note: The concert of August 11, 2016 in Budapest, Hungary at Sziget Festival.)	Budapest	Hungary	Sziget Festival	—N/a	—N/a	—N/a
August 12	Zürich	Switzerland	Letzigrund	Big Sean; DJ Mustard	—N/a	—N/a
August 14 (Note: The concert of August 14, 2016 in Bucharest, Romania at Piața Constituției is the opening concert of the Zutopia Music Festival. However, it will not be considered part of the festival.)	Bucharest	Romania	Piața Constituției	Delia	—N/a	—N/a
August 16 (Note: The concert of August 16, 2016 at the Mercedes-Benz Arena in Berlin was originally scheduled to take place on August 2 at the Olympiastadion.)	Berlin	Germany	Mercedes-Benz Arena	Big Sean; R3hab; Bibi Bourelly	13,480 / 13,480 (100%)	$973,632
August 18 (Note: The concert of August 18, 2016 in Hasselt, Belgium at Kempische Steenweg is a part of the Pukkelpop Festival. The concert was originally scheduled to take place on July 21 in Werchter, Belgium at Werchter Festival Park as a part of the Werchter Boutique Festival, but was postponed due to security issues.)	Hasselt	Belgium	Pukkelpop	—N/a	—N/a	—N/a
August 20 (Note: The concert on August 20, 2016 in Weston-under-Lizard, United Kingdom at Weston Park is part of the V Festival.)	Staffordshire	England	Weston Park	—N/a	—N/a	—N/a
August 21 (Note: The concert on August 21, 2016 in Chelmsford, United Kingdom at Hylands Park is part of the V Festival.)	Chelmsford	England	Hylands Park	—N/a	—N/a	—N/a
September 3 (Note: The concert on September 3, 2016 in Philadelphia, United States at Benjamin Franklin Parkway is a part of the Made in America Music Festival.)	Philadelphia	United States	Benjamin Franklin Parkway	—N/a	—N/a	—N/a
September 24 (Note: The concert on September 24, 2016 in New York City, United States at Central Park is a part of the Global Citizen Festival.)	New York City	United States	Central Park	—N/a	—N/a	—N/a
November 27 (Note: The concert on November 27, 2016 in Abu Dhabi, United Arab Emirates at du Arena is part of the Abu Dhabi Grand Prix.)	Abu Dhabi	United Arab Emirates	du Arena	—N/a	—N/a	—N/a
TOTAL					594,960 / 631,319 (94%)	$53,323,998

== Cancelled shows ==
Date	City	Country	Venue	Reason
June 17, 2016	Cardiff	Wales	Principality Stadium	Logistical reasons beyond the tours control
June 18, 2016	Sunderland	England	Stadium of Light	Logistical reasons beyond the tours control
July 15, 2016	Nice	France	Allianz Riviera	2016 Nice truck attack
