= Desperado (Rihanna song) =

Promotional single by Rihanna

from the album Anti
- Released: June 9, 2017 (Remix EP)
- Studio: Westlake Beverly Recording Studios
- Genre: Alternative R&B; indie rock
- Length: 3:06
- Label: Westbury Road; Roc Nation
- Songwriters: Jillian Banks; Krystin "Rook Monroe" Watkins; Mick Schultz; Iman Jordan; Robyn Fenty; James Fauntleroy; Derrus Rachel
- Producer: Mick Schultz

Audio video
- "Desperado" on YouTube

"Desperado" is a song recorded by Barbadian singer Rihanna for her eighth studio album, Anti (2016). It was written and produced by Mick Schultz with additional writing by Krystin "Rook Monroe" Watkins, Rihanna, Iman Jordan, James Fauntleroy and Derrus Rachel. During the recording process of Anti, Rihanna rented a house in Malibu over several months and started extensively writing and composing music with her team consisting of various musicians. One of the songwriters in the house was Krystin "Rook Monroe" Watkins. He together with American producer Mick Schultz worked on the song. Their efforts resulted in the mid-tempo indie rock song featuring deep synths and vocal samples.

Following the album's release "Desperado" was met with positive reviews who praised the song for its Western themes. On June 9, 2017, a dance remixes extended play was released via the iTunes Store for digital download and streaming on Apple Music and Spotify. It topped the US Dance Club Songs chart, becoming her fifth to do so in 2017; Rihanna became the only act to score as many number ones within a year. "Desperado" also became her seventh from Anti, the second only album to have produced as many, and her thirty-second single in total.

== Writing and recording ==
During the writing and recording process for Rihanna's eighth studio album, Anti, the singer was staying in a rented house in Malibu, California where she was accompanied by various musicians. One of the songwriters in the house was Krystin "Rook Monroe" Watkins. He together with American producer Mick Schultz had previously worked on a track, so he invited him over to the house, as he thought that Rihanna might be interested in the song. In an interview for Billboard, Schultz recalled, "I hadn’t even heard anything she was doing, so it was like completely a blind thing. But my friend Rook, who wrote the song, he was over there and he invited me to come over, so that was like a random chain of events that turned out to work but that’s not always the case. I don’t usually just bring in something like that randomly."

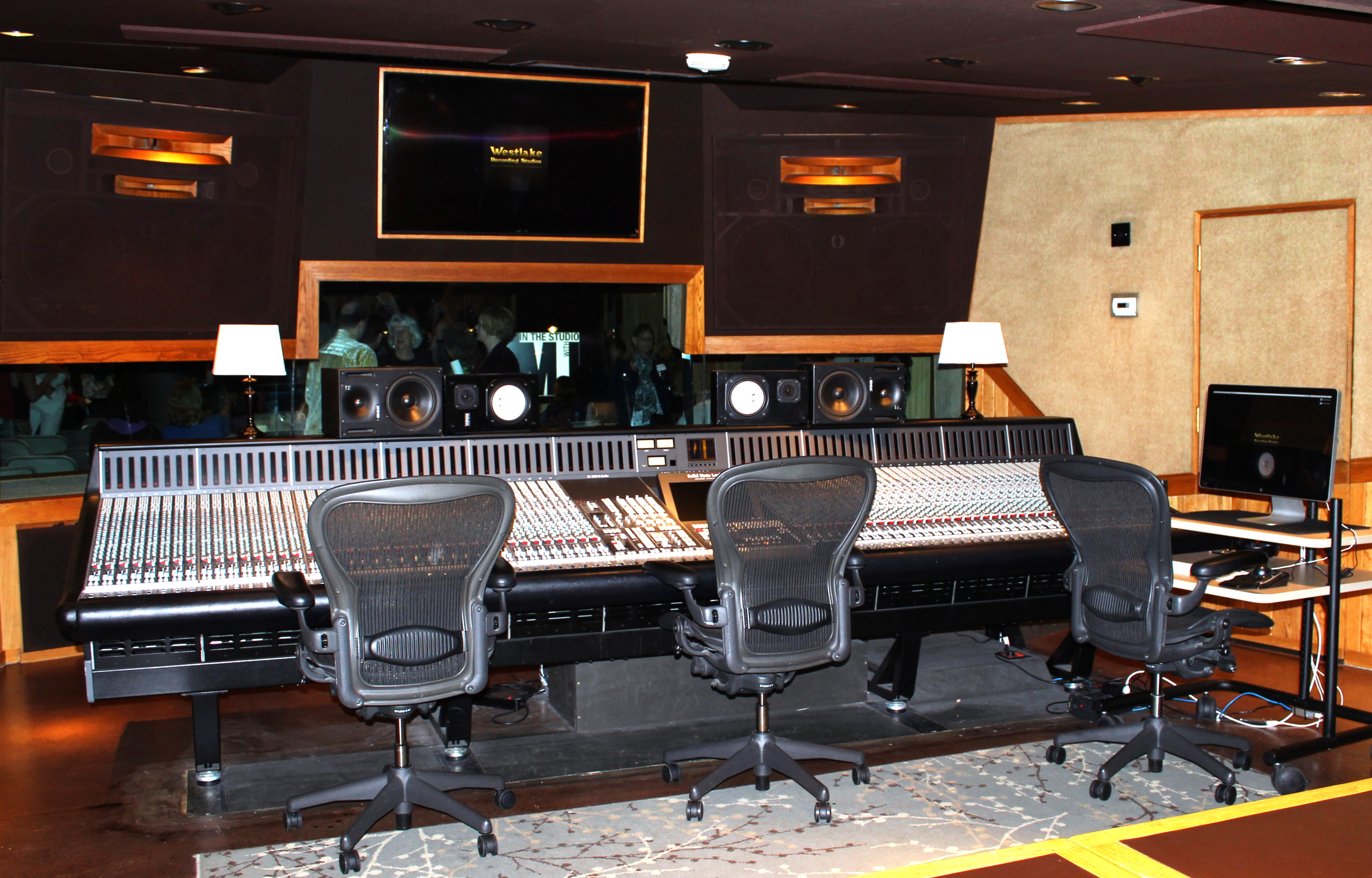
"Desperado" was recorded at the Westlake Beverly Recording Studios in Los Angeles.

Work on "Desperado" continued during Schultz and Monroe's stay in the house, where they were joined by Rihanna, James Fauntleroy and Derrus Rachel for the final result. For the developing process of the song, Schultz, who also produced it, commented, "One thing led to another and she cut it but I actually never really presented the record to her. Hey but if I did, I would’ve probably been like, "Hey, this is Rihanna. This is crazy." He intended to create a song that puts the listener in a mood, remarking how it has an "alternative vibe but still has urban undertones but it’s guitar and dirty live bass."

"Desperado" was recorded at the Westlake Beverly Recording Studios in Los Angeles. Rihanna's vocals were recorded by Marcos Tovar and Kuk Harrell; the latter also did the vocal production of the song. The recording process was assisted by Thomas Warren. In addition to co-writing it, Watkins and Fauntleroy also provided additional vocal arrangement to "Desperado"; the latter also sang additional background vocals. The guitar in the track was played by Mick Schultz, while the bass guitar was provided by Brian Schultz. The mixing of Desperado was done by Manny Marroquin at the Larabee Studios in Universal City with Chris Galland and Ike Schultz serving as the mixing assistants. Chris Gehringer did the mastering at the Sterling Sound Studios in New York City. On June 9, 2017, a dance remixes extended play was released via the iTunes Store for digital download and streaming on Apple Music and Spotify. The EP features four remixes of "Desperado" done by MK, 3lau, Andrelli and Fairlane.

== Composition and lyrical interpretation ==
"Desperado" is an alternative R&B and indie rock song with a length of three minutes and six seconds. It features a "mid-tempo groove, bell ringing and shuddering drums, along with deep synths and vocal samples." Jordan Bassett of NME described the track as "brooding" and "tense" and according to him, it has "buzzy" bassline and "ghostly" background vocals. Jessica McKinney of Vibe compared the opening eight seconds of the song to Banks' 'Waiting Game', and highlighted the singer's "choppy, rustic vocals." Lyrically, it sees Rihanna running towards her love interest who although doesn't seem impressing, she still sings, "There ain’t nothing for me here any more / But I don’t wanna be alone." Bianca Gracie of Idolator described the song as one of the more chilling tracks on the album and suggested that on it, Rihanna channels "her inner sinister Western anti-hero". In his review of Anti, Billy Johnson Jr. of Yahoo! stated that the title of the song, "Desperado", has multiple meanings; firstly, it references American West movies with phrases like "saddle up" and second "Rihanna is obviously desperate to skip town". Pitchfork's Amanda Petrusich analyzed the line "I can be a lone wolf" during which her vocals crack deeply. According to her, the song is about "self-isolation, and how being good at being on your own can become its own kind of albatross, a cage that bars from the inside." Jason Lipshutz of Fuse wrote that in the song Rihanna is "swaying between the decision to stay and the impulse to leave".

== Chart performance ==
"Desperado" debuted inside the top 50 of the United States Billboard Dance Club Songs chart at number 42 on August 12, 2017, with a 'gains in performance' tag. It continued to make chart gains week on week before breaking into the top 10 at number nine on September 16, 2017. It reached number-one for the chart issue dated October 14, 2017, in its eleventh week. The track became Rihanna's thirty-second number-one song on the chart, distancing herself from Beyoncé in third position with 22 and narrowing the gap with record holder Madonna who has 46. Billboard writer Gordon Murray commented that Rihanna is becoming ever closer to Madonna's record "at an astounding rate," and noted that she had attained nine number-ones since Madonna last topped the chart with "Bitch I'm Madonna" featuring Nicki Minaj in August 2015.

It is also her fifth number-one of 2017, following "Love on the Brain", "Sex with Me", "Pose" and "Wild Thoughts" (by DJ Khaled featuring herself and Bryson Tiller), the most by an act in a calendar year in the 41-year history of the chart; Rihanna had previously topped the chart four times in 2007, 2010, 2011 and 2016, as had Beyoncé in 2009, Lady Gaga in 2009 and 2010 and Katy Perry in 2014. "Desperado" is additionally the seventh song from her eighth studio album Anti (2016) to reach number-one, following "Work" (featuring Drake), "Kiss It Better", "Needed Me", "Love on the Brain", "Sex with Me" and "Pose", tying it with Teenage Dream (2010) by Perry (who first scored seven between 2010 and 2012) for the album with the most number-one songs.

== Cover versions ==
In celebration of their fifteen year old EP "Black Rooster", American indie rock band The Kills released an EP that featured acoustic versions of new and old songs. Included was an acoustic version of their original cover of Rihanna's "Desperado", which they originally unveiled in 2016. Accompanying the announcement, the band shared their latest rendition of "Desperado" on YouTube. The cover was released with a video featuring footage from the EP recording sessions.

== Formats and track listing ==
- Dance Remixes – EP
1. "Desperado" (MK Remix) – 3:35
2. "Desperado" (3lau Remix) – 3:24
3. "Desperado" (Andrelli Remix) – 3:03
4. "Desperado" (Fairlane Remix) – 3:29

== Credits and personnel ==
Credits adapted from Rihanna's official website.

Locations

- Recorded at Westlake Beverly Recording Studios in Los Angeles, California
- Mixed at Larrabee Studios in Universal City, California
- Mastering at Sterling Sound Studios in New York City, New York

Personnel

- Rihanna – vocals, writing
- Krystin "Rook Monroe" Watkins – writing, additional vocal arrangement
- Mick Schultz – writing, production, guitar
- Iman Jordan - writing, production
- James Fauntleroy – writing, additional vocal arrangement, additional background vocals
- Derrus Rachel – writing
- Kuk Harrell – vocal production, vocal recording
- Marcos Tovar – vocal recording
- Kuk Harrell – vocal recording, vocal production
- Thomas Warren – vocal recording assistant
- Brian Schultz – bass guitar
- Manny Marroquin – mixing
- Ike Schultz – mixing assistant
- Chris Galland – mixing assistant
- Chris Gehringer – mastering

== Charts ==
=== Weekly charts ===
Chart (2016–2017)	Peak position
France (SNEP)	109
Sweden (Sverigetopplistan)	90
Switzerland (Schweizer Hitparade)	51
UK Singles (Official Charts Company)	129
UK Hip Hop/R&B (Official Charts)	19
US Bubbling Under Hot 100 (Billboard)	7
US Dance Club Songs (Billboard)	1
US Hot R&B/Hip-Hop Songs (Billboard)	39

=== Year-end charts ===
Chart (2016)	Position
US Hot R&B Songs (Billboard)	38

== Certifications ==
Region	Certification	Certified units/sales
Australia (ARIA)	Platinum	70,000^{‡}
Brazil (Pro-Música Brasil)	Platinum	60,000^{‡}
Denmark (IFPI Danmark)	Gold	45,000^{‡}
France (SNEP)	Gold	100,000^{‡}
Poland (ZPAV)	Gold	25,000^{‡}
New Zealand (RMNZ)	Platinum	30,000^{‡}
United Kingdom (BPI)	Gold	400,000^{‡}
United States (RIAA)	3× Platinum	3,000,000^{‡}
Summaries
Worldwide	—	4,500,000
^{‡} Sales+streaming figures based on certification alone.

== Release history ==
Country	Date	Format	Label
Worldwide (Remixes)	June 9, 2017	Digital download	Westbury Road; Roc Nation

== See also ==
- List of number-one dance singles of 2017 (U.S.)
- Artists with the most number-ones on the U.S. Dance Club Songs chart
