= Iman Jordan =

American singer-songwriter

Iman Jordan (formerly Mateo)
- Born: Iman Jordan; Cincinnati, Ohio, United States
- Origin: Los Angeles, California
- Genres: Pop, Alternative R&B, Soul
- Occupations: Singer, songwriter, producer
- Instruments: Vocals, piano
- Years active: 2007–present
- Labels: MySpace Records, Interscope Records
- Website: www.listentoiman.com

Iman Jordan is an American Pop/Alternative R&B singer-songwriter from Cincinnati, Ohio, formerly known by his stage name Mateo. He was also formerly signed to the Krucial Noise imprint on Interscope Records, label imprint of Alicia Keys producer Kerry "Krucial" Brothers. Iman won the Harry Belafonte Best Song for Social Change Award for his song, "Deliver" during the 2025 Grammy Awards weekend. He has written songs for Rihanna ("Desperado"), Jazmine Sullivan, The Internet, and Alicia Keys, as well as DJDS' "No Pain" featuring Khalid and Charlie Wilson.

== Personal life ==
Iman was born in Cincinnati, Ohio, into a musical family. His grandfather, Freddy Jordan was a jazz and session guitarist at the historic King Records where he played for the likes of James Brown, Freddie King, and Charles Brown. His grandmother was a singer who toured Canada and the northeastern United States. Iman started singing at an early age and playing classical piano at age 5. He attended Morehouse College, majoring in music and business. After graduation, Iman moved to New York City where he briefly worked as a strategy consultant.

On June 21, 2016, Iman publicly came out as gay via his Instagram. He wrote, "Over the years, I've created so many faces and have done so many costume changes just to hide the simple fact that I am who I am. I've changed my name. I've worn clothes I didn't like. I've written songs about my most meaningful relationships and changed the pronouns. All for what...to meet my assumed expectation of others." Shortly after, he changed his artist name from Mateo to his birth given name, Iman Jordan.

== Early music career ==
=== 2008–10: Beginnings in Los Angeles and MySpace Records ===
Iman eventually moved to Los Angeles, in California, where he began performing under the name Mateo and pursued a career in the music industry. He met with former MTV VJ, Quddus., who was working at MySpace Records quickly took interest and brought Iman over to the label which signed him nearly on the spot. While on MySpace records, he released a three part mixtape series entitled "Underneath the Sky", which garnered critical acclaim. The mixtape series included features from Kardinal Offishall, Teairra Mari, Fashawn, and Shawn Chrystopher. On August 13, 2009, Iman recorded a live EP entitled Get To Know Me: Live at Swing House. His video, "Get to Know Me", from the live EP was featured by MTVU, Fuse, and Music Choice. After a year and a half stint at MySpace Records, Iman decided to part ways with the label in 2010.

=== 2010–2012: Krucial Noise signing, Love and Stadiums and Say It's So ===
In September 2010, he signed to Krucial Noise, the label imprint of Alicia Keys longtime producer and songwriting partner, Kerry "Krucial" Brothers. Brothers met him through Quddus during the MySpace Records days. He released his fourth mixtape Love & Stadiums on March 30, 2011, to critical acclaim. The mixtape serves as his first release under Krucial Noise and includes features from Goapele, Pusha T, Ab-Liva, Gilbere Forte, and Kardinal Offishall.

Iman released his debut single, "Say It's So", on September 21, 2011, off his EP Love & Stadiums II. The single is produced by Kerry Brothers and features additional vocals from Alicia Keys and Swizz Beatz. In September 2011, Iman shot a video for "Say It's So" in New York City, directed by David "Dahveed" Telles. The single charted independently on the Billboard 100 and reached No. 40 on the Urban chart, which garnered attention from Larry Jackson and John Ehman at Interscope Records

=== 2012–2015: Interscope signing, Suite 823, and "We've Met Before" ===
In April 2012, he officially signed to Interscope Records. While working with Kerry "Krucial" Brothers on the upcoming album, they decided to release an all original mixtape project for the summer, entitled Suite 823. The mixtape was released on August 1, 2012, to rave reviews, featuring an appearance by Motown recording artist, Stacy Barthe.

On August 13, 2013, he released an EP entitled, "We've Met Before" which peaked at No. 3 on the iTunes R&B charts. "How Good is Your Love" was the official single released from the EP. The video for the single peaked at No. 6 on BET's 106 and Park and in February 2014, he performed the song on VH-1's "Single Ladies".

In February 2015, he parted ways with Interscope and Krucial Noise.

=== 2016–2019: Sony ATV signing and self-entitled EP release ===
After leaving Interscope and Krucial Noise, Iman was signed to a publishing deal with Sony ATV. He garnered several high-profile placements, they include Rihanna's "Desperado", an artist feature on Robin Shulz "Uncovered" album, four songs on the critically acclaimed FOX TV show "Empire", one of which being performed by Alicia Keys and the new DJDS single, featuring Khalid.

In October 2018, he independently released his first song, "Therapy", from his self entitled EP. This was his first music release under the name Iman Jordan and since leaving Interscope. The entire EP was released on August 2, 2019, and was produced by Glashaus, the production duo consisting of Dan Glashausser and Tom Glashausser. A visual EP was created for every song on the album and released on YouTube.

The album was met with rave reviews and the song "Vibration, was featured on Spotify's Fresh Finds, Study Break, and Alt RnB playlists.

=== 2020–2021: "Technicolor", "Social Distance", "Freedom Song" and television features ===
Iman's 2020 single "Technicolor" was featured in Hulu's Whatever You're Feeling campaign and Gay Times Magazine, while "Social Distance" appeared on Showtime's The Chi.

During the Black Lives Matter protests, he released "Freedom Song," later featured on ABC's Station 19 and performed at ProGeorgia's Soul Serenade event.

=== 2022–present: "Odyssey", "State of Emergency", and 2025 Grammy Win ===
Iman's song "All Over Again" was featured on The Chi, and his 2022 EP Odyssey earned praise from Highsnobiety and Gay Times Magazine. His music landed on Spotify's Fresh Finds and Anti Pop playlists.

On February 1, 2025, Iman Jordan received the Harry Belafonte Best Song for Social Change Award at the 2025 Grammys for his song, "Deliver," written by himself, Roy Gartrell, Tam Jones, and Ariel Loh. "Deliver" and his most recent single, "War", are leading up to a socio-political EP entitled, "State of Emergency".

== Discography ==
=== Albums ===
List of album and single releases
Title	Album details
Get To Know Me: Live at Swing House	Released: August 13, 2009; Format: digital download; Label: MySpace Records

Title	Album details
Suite 823	Released: August 1, 2012; Format: digital download; Label: [Krucial Noise]

Title	Album details
We've Met Before	Released: August 13, 2013; Format: digital download; Label: Interscope Records [Krucial Noise]; Charted: #3 iTunes R&B Chart

Title	Album details
Iman EP	Released: August 2, 2019; Format: digital download; Label: Musaholic / Glashaus

Title	Album details
Technicolor (Single)	Released: April 22, 2020; Format: digital download; Label: Musaholic

Title	Album details
Social Distance (Single)	Released: October 21, 2020; Format: digital download; Label: Musaholic

Title	Album details
Odyssey EP	Released: November 9, 2024; Format: digital download; Label: Musaholic

Title	Album details
Deliver (Single)	Released: July 9, 2024; Format: digital download; Label: Musaholic

Title	Album details
War (Single)	Released: September 11, 2024; Format: digital download; Label: Musaholic

=== Writing discography ===
Year	Artist	Album/Single	Details
2008	Jazmine Sullivan	Fearless	Co-writer ("One Night Stand")
2009	Mateo	Complicated (Single)	Main Writer
2009	Mateo	Get to Know Me: Live at Swing House	Main Writer
2012	Mateo	Say Its So (Single)	Main Writer
2012	Mateo	Suite 823	Main Writer
2015	Alicia Keys	Empire	Co-writer ("For You")
2016	Rihanna	ANTI	Co-writer ("Desperado")
2016	Serayah	Empire	Co-writer ("Me"), Co-writer ("Starlight")
2017	Robin Schulz	Uncovered	Co-writer ("Love Me A Little")
2018	The Internet	Hive Mind	Co-writer ("Humble Pie")
2018	DJDS (featuring Khalid, Charlotte Day Wilson)	BIG WAVE MORE FIRE	Co-writer ("No Pain")
2018	Iman Jordan	Iman EP	Co-writer (Silence, Therapy, How High, Vibration, Pomona, KYHU, Shallow)
2019	Lena Meyer-Landrut	ONLY LOVE, L	Co-writer ("Sex In The Morning")
2024	Iman Jordan	Odyssey EP	Co-writer (Odyssey, We Got This, The Calling, LYDKY, Prophet$, California, Collard Greens in Paradise, Night and Day (Todos Santos, All Over Again)

=== Mixtapes ===
- Underneath the Sky Mixtape Ch. 1: Presented by Mick Boogie (2009)
- Underneath the Sky Mixtape Ch. 2: Presented by DJ Felli Fel (2009)
- Underneath the Sky Mixtape Ch. 3: Presented by Tapemasters Inc. (2010)
- Love & Stadiums Mixtape: Presented by Krucial Noise (2011)
- Suite 823 (2012)
