= Close to Me =

Close to Me may refer to:

- "Close to Me" (The Cure song), 1985
- "Close to Me" (G-Unit song), 2008
- "Close to Me" (Ellie Goulding, Diplo and Swae Lee song), 2018
- "Close to Me", a 2008 song by The Summer Set from ...In Color
- "Close to Me", a 2018 song by Isaiah Firebrace
- "Close to Me", a 2011 song by Sabrepulse
- "Close to Me", a 2021 song by Blackswan
- Close to Me (TV series), a 2021 British miniseries
- Close to Me (film), a 2024 Italian film

== See also ==
- Close to You (disambiguation)
- "Closer to Me", 2001 song by Five
- "Don't Stand So Close to Me", 1980 song by the Police
