= Closer to You =

Closer to You may refer to:

- Closer to You (Carried Away album), or the title song
- Closer to You (The Coronas album), 2011
- Closer to You (J. J. Cale album), 1994
- "Closer to You" (Carly Pearce song), 2018
- "Closer to You" (Exo-SC song), 2019
- "Closer to You" (Jungkook song), 2023
- "Closer to You", a song by Brandi Carlile from her eponymous album
- "Closer to You", a song by Brett Dennen from Hope for the Hopeless
- "Closer to You", a song by Clairo from Immunity
- "Closer to You", a song by the Mighty Lemon Drops from World Without End
- "Closer to You", a song by The Wallflowers from Red Letter Days

== See also ==
- Cerca de ti (disambiguation)
- Close to You (disambiguation)
