= Pose (Rihanna song) =

Promotional single by Rihanna

from the album Anti
- Released: April 14, 2017 (Remix EP)
- Studio: Westlake Beverly Recording Studios; Twin Studios
- Genre: Grime
- Length: 2:24
- Label: Westbury Road; Roc Nation
- Songwriters: Chauncey Hollis; Bibi Bourelly; Robyn Fenty; Jacques Webster
- Producer: Hit-Boy

"Pose" is a song recorded by the Barbadian singer Rihanna for her eighth album, Anti (2016); it is one of three bonus tracks included on the deluxe edition. She wrote the song in collaboration with Bibi Bourelly, Hit-Boy and Travis Scott, and it was produced by the latter two. Kuk Harrell was also enlisted as Rihanna's vocal producer. On April 14, 2017, Rihanna released a four-track EP which included remixes of "Pose" by the Far East Movement, Salva, Deadly Zoo and Eva Shaw.

"Pose" is a grime song with "Trap&B" influences and a "grungy" and "garbling" production. The song features bragging lyrics in which the singer confronts her critics.

Critical response to "Pose" was positive; a number of critics praised its composition and drew comparisons between the song and her 2015 single "Bitch Better Have My Money". Following the release of Anti, the song made an appearance on French charts. Shortly after the release of the Pose (Dance Remixes) EP, the song debuted at number 45 on the US Dance Club Songs chart, before peaking at number one. In doing so it became Rihanna's thirtieth number one on the chart and her sixth from Anti. "Pose" was featured on the set list of Rihanna's 2016 Anti World Tour.

== Background and release ==
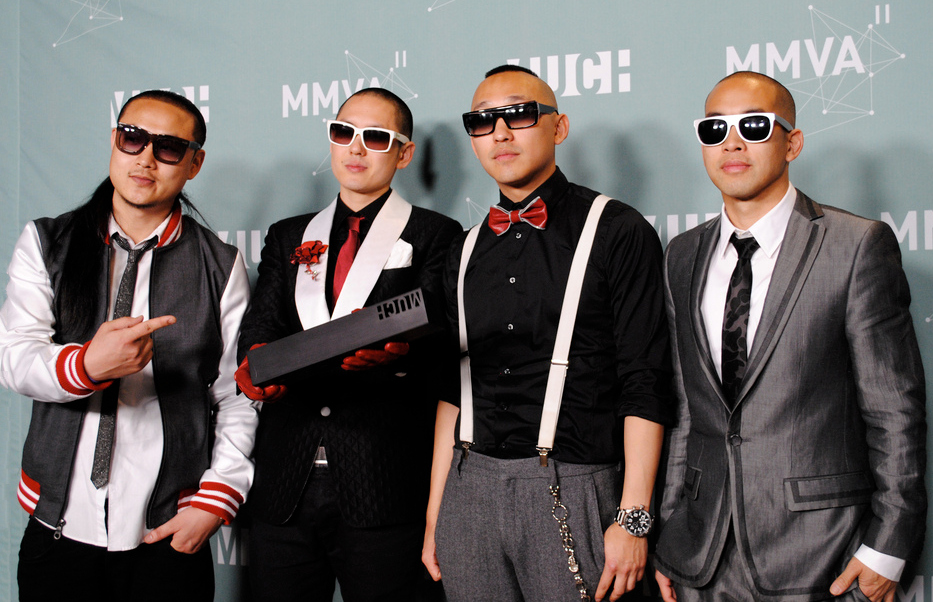
Far East Movement was one of four artists to remix the song.

Songwriter Bibi Bourelly had been working with producer Paperboy Fabe, who arranged a session with Kanye West. The sessions resulted in three songs – "Yeah, I Said It", "Higher" and "Pose". On December 27, 2015, songwriter, Glass John, took to Twitter to express his dissatisfaction about the delay of "Kiss It Better" release and its parent album, which he blamed on rapper Travis Scott, this led the media to believe that Scott would be either featured or working on Anti.

"Pose" was written by Hit-Boy, Bibi Bourelly, Travis Scott and Rihanna. It was produced by Hit-Boy and Travis Scott, with vocal production being carried out by Kuk Harrell respectively. The song was recorded at Westlake Recording Studios in Los Angeles and Twin Studios in Paris. The vocal recording was done by producer Kuk Harrell and Marcos Tovar, while Thomas Warren served as a recording assistant. "Pose" was mixed by Manny Marroquin at Larrabee Studios in Universal City, California and was assisted by Chris Galland and Ike Schultz. The song was mastered by Chris Gehringer at the Sterling Sound Studios in New York City.

On April 12, 2017, American hip hop group Far East Movement posted an image of Rihanna on their official Twitter account with the caption "...soon", leading the media to believe to that group and Rihanna would be working together on new music. On April 14, 2017, Rihanna released a four-track EP which included remixes of "Pose" by the Far East Movement, Salva, Deadly Zoo and Eva Shaw . That same day the remixes were made available for digital download via iTunes and streaming via Spotify.

== Composition and reception ==
"Pose" is a grime song with "trap&B" influences containing a "grimy" beat, which hears Rihanna using a "rap like vocal" according to Billboard. Da'Shan Smith of Billboard praised the song and Rihanna's rap-like vocals, stating the "singer finesses broken, staggered rapping into a party track that stunts on the haters." Jessie Morris on behalf of Complex described the song as containing a "grungy" and "garbling" production, which samples the sound of "an iMessage sending on an iPhone." Jessie Morris praised the song's production, stating it was a "monster of a track that ravages the beat;" she also found the use of an iPhone noise ironic due to Rihanna's partnership with Samsung.

Lyrically "Pose" was compared to Rihanna's non-album single "Bitch Better Have My Money" by Anna Swartz of Yahoo. Swartz stated that both songs contained a "bass-heavy beat" with "swaggering" lyrics. Swartz noted that "Pose" saw Rihanna confronting her "haters", which was picked up in lyrics such as "And I ain't never liked a broke bitch," "All my haters so-so broke, pipe down," and "All you lame ass bitches is a no go." The song's lyrics go on to attack "naysayers", whilst Rihanna brags about her earning. Swartz stated that unlike the song's parent album, which represented a general shift in Rihanna's musical style, "Pose" felt familiar and similar to Rihanna's previous work, concluding that is why the song was used on the deluxe edition.

== Commercial performance ==
Upon the release of Anti, "Pose" charted at number 98 in France on February 6, 2016. With the release of the remixes EP, the song debuted at number 45 on the US Dance Club Songs chart for the issue dated May 27, 2017, having charted outside the top 50 of the chart at number 51 the previous week. It was the second highest debut of the week, after "Still Got Time" by Zayn featuring PartyNextDoor, which debuted one position higher at number 44. It jumped to 29 the following week and again to number 15 in its third, earning the tag of 'gains in performance' from Billboard in both weeks. It broke into the top ten at number nine in its fourth week with an additional 'gains in performance,' yet despite only climbing two positions to number seven in its fifth week, it was the greatest gainer of all songs charting within the top 50.

It eventually topped the chart in its eighth week in the chart issue dated July 15, 2017, becoming her third to do so in 2017 following "Love on the Brain" and "Sex with Me" (the most amongst all acts thus far), her sixth from Anti, one of only three albums to have produced as many, and her thirtieth in total. Billboard chart analyst Gordon Murray noted that Rihanna is closing the gap with Madonna (46), writing that the former has topped the chart seven times since the latter last did so with "Bitch I'm Madonna" featuring Nicki Minaj in August 2015; similarly, Rihanna is the only artist to have charted at least three number-one songs in 2017, followed by Dua Lipa with two.

== Live performances ==
"Pose" was featured on the set list of Rihanna's 2016 Anti World Tour. The song was included in the "synopsis: greed is good", which featured black and white filming, Kitty Empire of The Guardian, stated that this section of the tour was "hip-hop gangster flick gone art-house".

== Formats and track listings ==
Digital download – Deluxe album version

15. "Pose" – 2:24

Digital download – Remixes (Explicit)

1. "Pose" (Far East Movement Remix) – 3:21
2. "Pose" (Salva Remix) – 3:23
3. "Pose" (Deadly Zoo Remix) – 2:56
4. "Pose" (Eva Shaw Remix) – 2:11

Digital download – Remixes (Clean)

1. "Pose" (Far East Movement Remix) – 3:20
2. "Pose" (Salva Remix) – 3:23
3. "Pose" (Deadly Zoo Remix) – 2:56
4. "Pose" (Eva Shaw Remix) – 2:11

== Credits and personnel ==
The following credits were adapted from the liner notes of Anti, Westbury Road/Roc Nation.

Publishing

- Hit-Boy Music / U Can't Teach Bein’ The Shhh / Songs of Universal (BMI)// Circa 13/BMG/Arjouni Publishing (ASCAP)// Almo Music Corp./ Fauntleroy Music (ASCAP)// Monica Fenty Music Publishing /Warner-Tamerlane Publishing Corp. (BMI); All rights administered by Warner-Tamerlane Publishing Corp.// Travis Scott Music (BMI)

Recording

- Recorded at Westlake Beverly Recording Studios, Los Angeles; Twin Studios, Paris
- Mixed at Larrabee Studios, Universal City, California
- Mastered at Sterling Sound, New York City, New York

Personnel

- Songwriting – Chauncey Hollis, Bibi Bourelly, Robyn Fenty, Jacques Webster
- Production – Hit-Boy
- Additional production – Travis Scott
- Vocal production – Kuk Harrell
- Vocal recording – Marcos Tovar, Kuk Harrell
- Assistant vocal recording – Thomas Warren
- Mastering – Chris Gehringer
- Mixing – Manny Marroquin
- Assistant mixing – Chris Galland, Ike Schultz

== Charts ==
Chart performance
Chart (2016–2017)	Peak position
France (SNEP)	98
US Dance Club Songs (Billboard)	1
US R&B/Hip-Hop Digital Song Sales (Billboard)	38

== Release history ==
Country	Date	Format	Label
Worldwide (Remixes)	April 14, 2017	Digital download	Westbury Road; Roc Nation

== See also ==
- Artists with the most number-ones on the U.S. Dance Club Songs chart
- List of number-one dance singles of 2017 (U.S.)
