= Roy Nachum =

Israeli artist

Roy Nachum רועי נחום
- Born: 1979 (age 46–47); Jerusalem, Israel
- Education: The Cooper Union School of Art
- Known for: Artist
- Notable work: The King (2010), Fire (2011), Crowns (2012), S3 (2015)
- Spouse: Maia Nachum
- Website: http://www.roynachum.com

Roy Nachum (Hebrew: רועי נחום; born 1979) is an Israeli New York-based contemporary artist working in painting, sculpture, and installation.

== Biography ==
Nachum was born in Jerusalem, Israel, and studied at Bezalel Academy of Arts and Design in Jerusalem from 2001 to 2004, and at Cooper Union in New York City from 2004 to 2005. He works in both New York and Italy. Nachum's paintings, installations, and sculptures incorporate elements traditionally used in conceptual and interactive art. A motif Nachum has often used is the image of a child wearing a gold crown that shields his eyes (The King, 2010), suggesting man's blindness caused by displaced values and desire. Nachum uses braille text and ash in his "Fire paintings" (Fire, 2011). The works are made in collaboration with blind people whose fingerprints are left on the work, thus documenting their touch and leaving a trace of human contact.

In 2015, Nachum designed the artwork for Rihanna's eighth studio album Anti. In 2017 he was nominated for the 59th Annual Grammy Awards for Best Recording Package for the art and art direction of Rihanna's platinum album.

== Public art ==
The 14-foot sculpture Kings 2016 by the artist, consisting of golden crowns, sits in front of the 5 Franklin Place condo in Tribeca in New York City.
