= Consideration (song) =

2017 promotional single by Rihanna featuring SZA

Promotional single by Rihanna featuring SZA

from the album Anti
- Released: December 8, 2017 (remix EP)
- Studio: Jungle City (New York City)
- Genre: Pop; alternative R&B; hip-hop
- Length: 2:41
- Label: Westbury Road; Roc Nation
- Songwriters: Solana Rowe; Tyran Donaldson; Robyn Fenty
- Producer: Tyran "Scum" Donaldson

Audio video
- "Consideration" on YouTube

"Consideration" is a song by Barbadian singer Rihanna featuring American singer-songwriter SZA from the former's eighth studio album, Anti (2016). The track was released on December 8, 2017, as the album's fourth and final promotional single, through Westbury Road Entertainment and Roc Nation. Rihanna and SZA wrote the song alongside its producer, Tyran Donaldson. It was also recorded at Jungle City Studios, based in New York City. The song is a dub-inspired pop, alternative R&B, and hip-hop tune in the key of G minor with instrumentation consisting of a "stuttering, distorted beat", "pounding percussion", "a crunchy groove", and a "throbbing bass line". Its lyrics are a declaration of independence and a desire to seek peace of mind.

Rihanna performed "Consideration" with SZA in a medley with "Work" at the 2016 Brit Awards, after which she included it on the set list of her seventh concert tour, the Anti World Tour (2016). Upon the release of the album, "Consideration" peaked at number 13 on the US Bubbling Under Hot 100, number 38 on the US Hot R&B/Hip-Hop Songs chart, number 63 in France, and number 72 in Sweden. Following the Brit Awards performance, the song peaked at number 88 on the UK Singles Chart and number 18 on the UK Hip Hop and R&B Singles Chart. Two years later, in 2018, it topped the US Dance Club Songs chart. It was certified double platinum in the United States, platinum in Australia, Brazil, and New Zealand, and gold in Denmark, France, and the United Kingdom.

== Background and recording ==
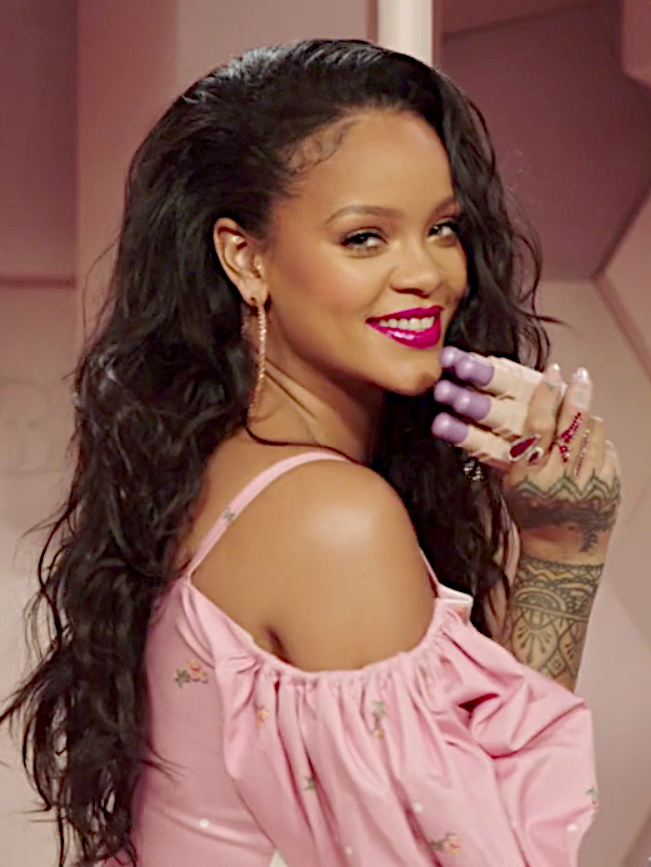
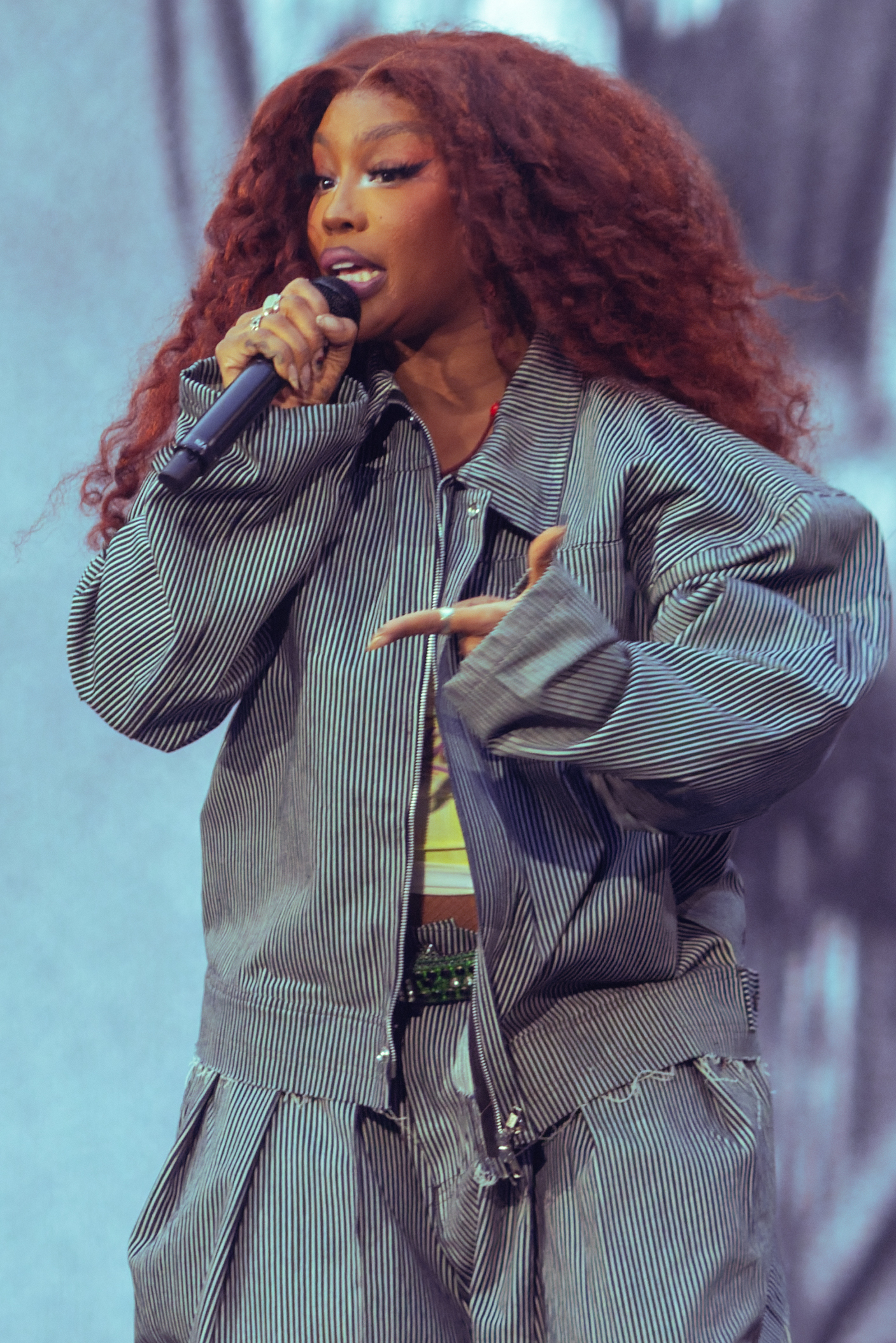
"Consideration" is a collaboration between Rihanna (left) and SZA (right).

"Consideration" was originally meant for inclusion on SZA's debut album, Ctrl (2017), with the title "LouAnne Johnson", which was inspired by and named after Michelle Pfeiffer's character in Dangerous Minds (1995). SZA has stated that the song reminded her of the movie Dangerous Minds (1995) "mixed with the yodeling" from Insidious (2010). Rihanna invited SZA to a writing camp, but SZA was ultimately unsuccessful in writing any new music for her at the time; however, to impress Pharrell Williams, she performed "Consideration", which Rihanna later asked to have for her album, Anti. SZA's decision to relinquish the song ultimately "devastated" her and made her think "[she'll] never make anything better". Speaking to i-D, SZA said that she needed "Consideration" for her album, also saying that it would have been completed a year earlier if she kept the song. She added: "In some circles I think people thought it would do more for me. I didn't think it would do anything. So I guess I landed somewhere in the middle".

"Consideration" was written by Solana Rowe (who is known professionally as SZA), Tyran Donaldson, and Rihanna. It was produced by Donaldson, with vocal production by Kuk Harrell. Shea Taylor was responsible for keyboards, Carter Lang played organ and synth bass, and Marcos Tovar was in charge of the vocal recording. The song was recorded at the Jungle City Studios in New York City and mixed at Larrabee Studios in Universal City. "Consideration" features vocals by SZA, who is part of Top Dawg Entertainment, an independent label, alongside Donaldson. She published a few lines of the track during an Instagram post on May 21, 2015. On December 8, 2017, Westbury Road Entertainment and Roc Nation released a dance remixes extended play for digital download and streaming on Apple Music and Spotify. The EP features six remixes of "Consideration" done by MK, Dirty South, Mangal Suvarnan, James Carter, Will Clarke, and the Stafford Brothers.

== Composition and lyrical interpretation ==
"Consideration" is the opening track on the album, with a length of two minutes and forty-one seconds. Jeff Benjamin of Fuse considered it "more of Anti's intro track than a proper pop song". It was written in the key of G minor with a tempo of 145 beats per minute. It is a "glitchy, dub-inspired" pop, alternative R&B, and hip-hop track, "fusing an eerie, down-tempo tune", with a "stuttering, distorted beat", "pounding percussion", "a crunchy groove", and a "throbbing bass line". During the song, she leans more heavily on her Barbadian accent, "jump[ing] from powerful, low notes to head-voice notes". Rihanna's tone is "pugnacious, but playful", according to Emily MacKay of NME. Forrest Wickman of Slate stated that Kuk Harrell "lift[s] the bass line from Common's 'Be (Intro)'".

Lyrically, "Consideration" is a declaration of independence, outlining "her worth as artist and business asset". The song opens with "a Peter Pan metaphor about being held back from maturing", where she sings: "I come fluttering in from Neverland [...] Why will you never let me grow?". In the chorus, she bluntly sings: "I got to do things my own way, darling", while also expressing dissatisfaction and asking "in a thick patois": "Will you ever let me? Will you ever respect me? No!". During the second verse, she "asserts that she's through with acting as the world's avatar", asking: "Darling, would you mind giving my reflection a break from the pain it's feeling now?". During the second verse Rihanna sings rebelliously, "Let me cover your shit in glitter, I can make it gold".

Nolan Feeney of Time opined that in the song, "Rihanna seems determined to explain what took her so long". Chris Gerard of PopMatters stated that the lyrics deal with "an issue that frequently arises when a young artist who is largely controlled by record label executives, managers and producers gets to the point where she can flex her own artistic muscles". Sal Cinquemani of Slant Magazine said that "without missing a beat, Rihanna provides a pointed, unapologetic rejoinder to the rhetorical questions posed in the song's lyrics: 'No.'"

== Response ==
=== Commercial performance ===
In North America, "Consideration" peaked at number 13 on the US Bubbling Under Hot 100, number 1 on the US Dance Club Songs chart, and number 38 on the US Hot R&B/Hip-Hop Songs chart. It was certified double platinum by the Recording Industry Association of America (RIAA). In South America, it was certified platinum by Pro-Música Brasil (PMB). In Europe, the song peaked at number 63 in France, number 72 in Sweden, number 88 on the UK Singles Chart, and number 18 on the UK Hip Hop and R&B Singles Chart. It was certified gold by IFPI Danmark, Syndicat National de l'Édition Phonographique (SNEP), and the British Phonographic Industry (BPI). In Oceania, it was certified platinum by the Australian Recording Industry Association (ARIA) and Recorded Music NZ (RMNZ).

=== Critical reception ===
Amanda Petrusich of Pitchfork described "Consideration" as "a prickly collaboration with the R&B singer SZA", noting that "the sentiment feels deliberately placed, meant as a way to read everything that follows". Petrusich also highlighted her "grainy, mesmerizing voice [which] is paramount [on the track]". Julianne Escobedo Shepherd of Billboard defined the song as "a plucky thesis that delivers as the album's stony layers peel back", calling it "a loping, patois pop number". Whereas Brittany Spanos of Rolling Stone reflected: "After years as a singer largely defined by her production, it finally feels like Rihanna is in charge of her own sound, remaking pop on her own terms". Emily MacKay of NME claimed the song's message is clear: "she's excelled at being a pro, but now is her time to be an Anti". Jordan Bassett of the same publication commended the song for being "such a strong start", highlighting "the pounding percussion and Rihanna's confident flow for arrest[ing] your attention. It's languid but assured, and that's before neo-soul singer SZA's otherworldly, Kate Bush-style vocals bob and weave around the beat".

Patrick Ryan of USA Today praised the song for being a "punchy, broody banger", and further described it as "a confident, promising prelude to whatever else Anti has in store". Forrest Wickman of Slate labelled it "a swaggering statement of purpose for post–Def Jam Rihanna". Claire Lobenfeld of Fact wrote that the track "is a flag waving toward change", declaring that it "portends the subdued album that is about to come. And it's about damn time that Rihanna ditched enormous party-starters in favor of her blunted reality". Brennan Carey of Spin praised the artistry within the song, while Safy-Hallan Farah, of the same publication, noted that the song is "an appropriate introduction to an idiosyncratic album". Emily Jupp of The Independent was positive, declaring: "Picture driving in a car, slowly, with the roof down, there's a haze of perfumed smoke in the air. The song sets out her agenda for the album; doing it her own way with surprising lyrics and introducing a relaxed stoner vibe".

Sal Cinquemani of Slant Magazine noted that the "heavy, distorted '90s-style loop and guest vocal by neo-soul singer SZA, suggested that Rihanna is determined to 'grow.'" Patricia Garcia of Vogue noted that the song "gives a mainstream introduction to the incredibly talented and underrated SZA, but it also may underscore Rihanna's intention to separate herself from her pop past". Jessica McKinney of Vibe praised the pair, writing that, "the two compliment [sic] each other well as they exchange vocals about cutting ties", noting that the sound "stay[s] true to SZA's alt-soul background and Rih's affinity for hip-hop". McKinney also noticed that it "has a feel good nature that sets the pace for what the rest of the album will sound like". Allan Raible of ABC News opined that "while authoritative and coldly sleek, [it] sets things off on a quirky, off-kilter foot". Chris Gerard of PopMatters had mixed feelings, describing "Consideration" as "a pedestrian mid-tempo groove with no real spark".

== Live performances ==
During the 2016 Brit Awards, Rihanna performed "Consideration" with SZA as an introduction to the full performance of "Work" on February 24, 2016. This live performance was Rihanna's first appearance to promote the album. "Consideration" was also included on the set list of her seventh concert tour, the Anti World Tour (2016). Josh Duboff of Vanity Fair praised Rihanna's performances of both "Consideration" and "Needed Me", noting that they "came alive more in the live setting than they do on the album, perhaps due to Rihanna's evident passion in selling them".

== Track listing ==
Dance Remixes
| No. | Title | Writer(s) | Producer(s) | Length |
|---|---|---|---|---|
| 1. | "Consideration" (featuring SZA) (MK remix) | Solana Rowe; Tyran Donaldson; Robyn Fenty | Donaldson; Kuk Harrell^{[a]} | 3:55 |
| 2. | "Consideration" (featuring SZA) (Dirty South remix) | Rowe; Donaldson; Fenty | Donaldson; Harrell^{[a]} | 3:37 |
| 3. | "Consideration" (featuring SZA) (Mangal Suvarnan remix) | Rowe; Donaldson; Fenty | Donaldson; Harrell^{[a]} | 3:26 |
| 4. | "Consideration" (featuring SZA) (James Carter remix) | Rowe; Donaldson; Fenty | Donaldson; Harrell^{[a]} | 2:37 |
| 5. | "Consideration" (featuring SZA) (Will Clarke remix) | Rowe; Donaldson; Fenty | Donaldson; Harrell^{[a]} | 3:44 |
| 6. | "Consideration" (featuring SZA) (Stafford Brothers remix) | Rowe; Donaldson; Fenty | Donaldson; Harrell^{[a]} | 3:23 |
| Total length: | | | | 20:45 |

=== Notes ===
- ^{^[a]} signifies a vocal producer.

== Credits and personnel ==
Credits are adapted from Rihanna's official website.

=== Recording ===
- Recorded at Jungle City Studios, New York City.
- Mixed at Larrabee Studios, Universal City, CA.
- Mastered at Sterling Sound, New York City.

=== Personnel ===
- Songwriting – Solana Rowe, Tyran Donaldson, Robyn Fenty
- Vocals – Rihanna, SZA
- Production – Tyran "Scum" Donaldson
- Vocal production – Kuk Harrell
- Vocal recording – Marcos Tovar, Kuk Harrell
- Assistant recording engineer – Brendan Morawski
- Mastering – Chris Gehringer
- Keyboards – Shea Taylor
- Mixing – Manny Marroquin
- Assistant mixing engineer – Chris Galland
- Organ, synth bass – Carter Lang

== Charts ==
Chart performance for "Consideration"
| Chart (2016–2018) | Peak position |
|---|---|
| France (SNEP) | 63 |
| Sweden (Sverigetopplistan) | 72 |
| UK Singles (Official Charts) | 88 |
| UK Hip Hop/R&B (Official Charts) | 18 |
| US Bubbling Under Hot 100 (Billboard) | 13 |
| US Dance Club Songs (Billboard) | 1 |
| US Hot R&B/Hip-Hop Songs (Billboard) | 38 |

== Certifications ==
Certifications for "Consideration"
| Region | Certification | Certified units/sales |
|---|---|---|
| Australia (ARIA) | Platinum | 70,000^{‡} |
| Brazil (Pro-Música Brasil) | Platinum | 60,000^{‡} |
| Denmark (IFPI Danmark) | Gold | 45,000^{‡} |
| France (SNEP) | Gold | 100,000^{‡} |
| New Zealand (RMNZ) | Platinum | 30,000^{‡} |
| United Kingdom (BPI) | Gold | 400,000^{‡} |
| United States (RIAA) | 2× Platinum | 2,000,000^{‡} |
^{‡} Sales+streaming figures based on certification alone.

== Release history ==
Release dates and formats for "Consideration"
| Country | Date | Format | Label | Ref. |
|---|---|---|---|---|
| Worldwide (Remixes) | December 8, 2017 | Digital download; streaming | Westbury Road; Roc Nation | |

== See also ==
- List of number-one dance singles of 2018 (U.S.)
