= Cerca de ti =

Cerca de ti may refer to:

- Cerca de ti (Lucía Méndez album), 1982
- Cerca de ti (Lucero album), 1998, or the title track
- "Cerca de ti" (song), a 2004 song by Thalía
- "Cerca de Ti", 1993 song by The Barrio Boyzz
