= Close to You =

Close to You may refer to:

== Film and television ==
- Close to You (2006 film), a Filipino film
- Close to You (2023 film), an independent film directed by Dominic Savage
- Close to You: Remembering The Carpenters, a 1998 documentary film
- "Close to You" (Heroes), a television episode
- Close to You, a Pikmin animated short film by Nintendo Pictures

== Music ==
=== Albums ===
- Close to You (The 88 album) or the title song, 2016
- Close to You (The Carpenters album) or the title song (see below), 1970
- Close to You (Father MC album) or the title song, 1992
- Close to You (Frank Sinatra album) or the 1943 title song (see below), 1957
- Close to You (Johnny Mathis album), 1970
- Close to You (Sarah Vaughan album), 1960
- Close to You, by Changmin, 2015
- Close to You, or the title song (see below), by Fun Factory, 1995
- Close to You, by Kate Wolf, 1980
- Close to You, by The Lettermen, 1991

=== Songs ===
- "Close to You" (1943 song), written by Jerry Livingston, Carl Lampl, and Al Hoffman
- Close to You (Dayglow song), 2021
- "Close to You" (Frank Ocean song), 2016
- "Close to You" (Fun Factory song), 1994
- "Close to You" (Gracie Abrams song), 2024
- "Close to You" (Maxi Priest song), 1990
- "Close to You" (Tohoshinki song), 2008
- "Close to You" (Whigfield song), 1995
- "(They Long to Be) Close to You", written by Burt Bacharach and Hal David, first recorded by Richard Chamberlain, 1963; covered by the Carpenters (1970) and others
- "Close to You", by Abhi the Nomad from Abhi vs the Universe
- "Close to You", by Andrew Hyatt from Four Good Years
- "Close to You", by the Avalanches from Since I Left You
- "Close to You", by Ayumi Hamasaki from Rainbow
- "Close to You", by BeBe & CeCe Winans from Still
- "Close to You", by Brett Kissel from Let Your Horses Run
- "Close to You", by the Brand New Heavies
- "Close to You", by DJ Tiësto from In My Memory
- "Close to You", by Fergie from The Dutchess
- "Close to You", by Frost
- "Close to You", by Jay Sean from Neon
- "Close to You", by JLS from JLS
- "Close to You", by Lovelyz from Once Upon a Time
- "Close to You", by Marti Pellow from Smile
- "Close to You", by Neon Trees from Picture Show
- "Close to You", by Rihanna from Anti
- "Close to You", by Screaming Jets from Scam
- "Close to You", by Simply Red from Love and the Russian Winter
- "Close to You", written by Willie Dixon, first recorded by Muddy Waters

== Other ==
- Close to You, a 2001 novel by Mary Jane Clark

== See also ==
- "So Close to You", a song by Marta Sánchez from Woman
