= Closer (TV series) =

Canadian television series

Closer is a Canadian television series where new and emerging artists are interviewed in an intimate setting. It was launched on aux.tv, a Canadian music website, and BiteTV, a digital cable channel, in late 2008 and currently airs on both.

The show is an interstitial program, playing in two-minute segments before and after commercial breaks for other Aux TV shows. The show profiles new and emerging artists in alternative rock, hip hop, indie rock, alternative country and other genres, speaking frankly about issues, thoughts, or anything else the artist wishes to discuss.

== Collaborations ==
In February 2009, aux.tv participated with CBC Radio 3 and Exclaim! to launch X3, a new collaborative cross-promotional platform which sees all three outlets air feature content spotlighting a particular "Artist of the Month". The first X3 artist of the month was K'naan, and the second was Malajube. These artists are featured on Closer for the month they are the X3 Artist.

== Episodes ==
Air Date	Band
February 9, 2009	K'Naan
March 23, 2009	Malajube
April 6, 2009	Thunderheist
