= Anti (album) =

2016 studio album by Rihanna

Studio album by Rihanna
- Released: January 28, 2016
- Recorded: 2013 – 2015
- Studios: Westlake; Sandra Gale (Los Angeles); Jungle City (New York City); Twin (Paris); Windmark (Santa Monica); SOTA (Toronto)
- Genres: Pop; dancehall; psychedelic soul; R&B
- Length: 43:36
- Labels: Westbury Road; Roc Nation
- Producers: Boi-1da; Brian Kennedy; Chad Sabo; Daniel Jones; DJ Mustard; Fade Majah; Fred Ball; Hit-Boy; Jeff Bhasker; Kevin Parker; Mick Schultz; Mitus; No I.D.; Robert Shea Taylor; Scum; Timbaland

Rihanna chronology
Unapologetic (2012)	Anti (2016)

Singles from Anti
- 1. "Work" Released: January 27, 2016; 2. "Kiss It Better" / "Needed Me" Released: March 30, 2016; 3. "Love on the Brain" Released: September 27, 2016

Anti is the eighth studio album by Barbadian singer Rihanna. It was released on January 28, 2016, by Roc Nation and Westbury Road. Rihanna started recording in 2013 after departing from Def Jam Recordings, who had released all of her albums since her 2005 debut. As executive producer, Rihanna recorded Anti with producers including Jeff Bhasker, Boi-1da, DJ Mustard, Hit-Boy, Brian Kennedy, Timbaland and No I.D., at studios in Canada, the United States and France. SZA and Drake contribute guest vocals.

Conceived in the midst of creative struggles and emotional turmoil, Anti is characterized by atmospheric production incorporating lo-fi beats, distorted vocals and downtempo arrangements. The first half consists of bass-heavy tracks, while the second is characterized by textured minimalism. Compared to the radio-friendly dance songs which had characterized Rihanna's prior discography, Anti is more muted and soulful. Primarily a pop, dancehall, psychedelic soul and R&B album, Anti also incorporates an array of eclectic influences spanning from hip hop, soul, industrial, psychedelic, doo-wop, country, synth-rock and trap. The lyrics are about the emotions ensued from love and relationships, from endearment and desire to betrayal and liberation, with references to sex, drugs and alcohol.

The promotional campaign for Anti from summer 2014 comprised prolonged release delays and a $25 million deal with Samsung. Rihanna announced the cover art and title at the MAMA Gallery on 7 October 2015. The Anti World Tour ran from March to November 2016, and four songs were released as singles, including the US Billboard Hot 100 number one "Work". In the United States, Anti is Rihanna's second number-one album and the only album by a black woman to spend 500 weeks on the Billboard 200; it was certified six-times platinum by the Recording Industry Association of America. The album topped charts in Canada and Norway, and it received multi-platinum certifications in Belgium, Canada, Denmark, France, New Zealand, Poland, and the United Kingdom.

Upon its release, critics commended the album's emotional honesty but were divided on the production; praise mainly centered on Rihanna's newfound musical freedom. Some took issue with the lack of radio-friendly songs and the unfocused tracklist, but others noted the musical shift marked Rihanna's artistic maturity and regarded it as one of her best albums. At the 2017 Grammy Awards, the album and its singles received six nominations, including one for Best Urban Contemporary Album. Anti featured on 2010s decade-end lists by such publications as Billboard, NME and Pitchfork. It ranked 230th on Rolling Stone's 2020 edition of the 500 Greatest Albums of All Time and 55th on Apple Music 100 Best Albums. As of July 2025, Anti is the fourth-longest charting female album in Billboard 200 history.

== Background ==
Rihanna's seventh studio album, Unapologetic, was released on 19 November 2012, by Def Jam Recordings. Unapologetic combines urban and R&B with radio-friendly pop tunes and dubstep influences, and its lyrics are about Rihanna's sexual autonomy and emotional struggles. Critics likened the sound and themes of Unapologetic's to those of her previous albums, namely Rated R (2009), Loud (2010) and Talk That Talk (2011). She embarked on the Diamonds World Tour to promote the album in 2013, and co-headlined the Monster Tour with American rapper Eminem in 2014. After touring, Rihanna intended to take a year off to "just do whatever [she wanted] artistically, creatively", but reportedly started recording new music as soon as October 2014.

Unapologetic was Rihanna's last album under Def Jam, who had released all of her discography since her first album, Music of the Sun (2005). In March 2014, she signed with American rapper Jay-Z's Roc Nation after leaving Def Jam and gaining the right to her album masters; Jay-Z was her mentor when she first moved from Barbados to the United States. Up to that point, Rihanna had released one studio album each year from 2005 to 2012 (with the exception of 2008), totalling seven.

== Recording and production ==
In an interview with MTV News in March 2015, Rihanna said she wanted her eighth album to be "soulful" and "timeless", having found the "really, really big songs" on her past albums had fallen out of her taste; "I wanted an album that I could perform in 15 years. ... Not any songs that were burnt out." By January 2015, the album was to be executive-produced by rapper-producer Kanye West, who had produced and co-performed on its intended lead single, "FourFiveSeconds" alongside English musician Paul McCartney; however, West stepped down from the project in January 2016. Although Rihanna wanted the record to represent her authentic self, feeling "numb" and disconnected from her emotions, she experienced an emotional turmoil. Speaking with Sarah Paulson for the October 2019 issue of Interview, Rihanna talked about her spiritual wellbeing while making Anti: "I have been in a place where I felt like maybe I had disappointed God so much that we weren't as close."

The album's recording sessions took place at various studios, including the Jungle City Studios in New York City, Westlake Recording Studios, Sandra Gale Studios and Windmark Recording Studios in Los Angeles, SOTA Studios in Toronto and Twin Studios in Paris. Most of the songs were recorded at the Westlake Recording Studios. Songwriter Bibi Bourelly had been working with producer Paperboy Fabe, who arranged a session with West. The result was the song "Higher". Later, Rihanna and James Fauntleroy also contributed to the song writing. "Higher" was recorded in the early morning hours while Rihanna was under the influence of alcohol. "We just said, 'You know what? Let's just drink some whiskey and record this song.'" The song was described by Rihanna as "a drunk voice mail". Rihanna and Fauntleroy also collaborated on three other songs – "Desperado", "Close to You," and "James Joint". The latter was written with Rihanna and Shea Taylor, who wrote the song in less than 30 minutes, while "Close To You" was written after producer Brian Kennedy sent Fauntleroy a piano music sample.

"Desperado" was written by Mick Shultz and Rook Monroe. After visiting Rihanna's home, Shultz was contacted a week later by the singer's team who stated that she really liked the record. Rihanna, Fauntleroy and Kuk Harrell, were all later involved in the song's development, production and recording. In the summer of 2015, songwriter and producer Rupert Thomas together with Allen Ritter and Boi-1da among others, stayed at Canadian rapper's Drake's house in Los Angeles for several days. During the time, the lead single, "Work" was conceived. Thomas created the beat and played it for Boi-1da to which he positively responded. Boi-1da came up with the idea for sampling an "old school dancehall rhythm" after the chords were made. When the song's music was finished, Boi-1da sent it to PartyNextDoor who wrote the lyrics.

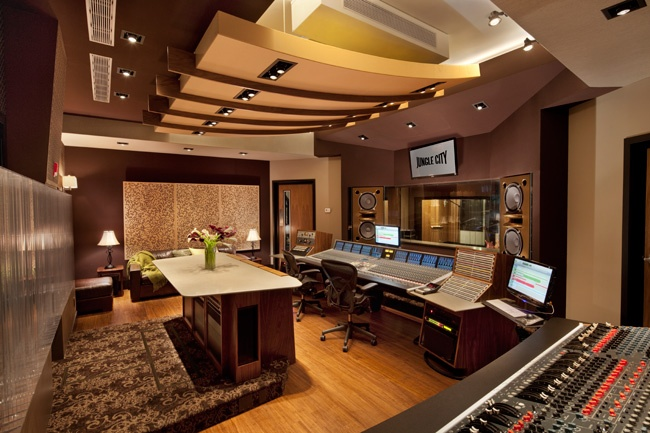
The Jungle City Studios in New York City served as one of the various recording locations.

Two songs each were recorded at Jungle City Studios in New York City and Windmark Recording Studios in Los Angeles. The studio sessions at Jungle City produced the opening track "Consideration" and "Kiss It Better". Rihanna stated when recording "Consideration", she felt a connection to it, stating the song captured the sound and attitude she was aiming for. The recording sessions at Windmark Recording Studios produced the songs "Never Ending" and "Love on the Brain". The former was written by Chad Sabo during his time in California, where Sabo was playing with the band Basic Vacation. Sabo was in the band's van and began to write the intro riff that would become "Never Ending". Shortly after, he took the song home and attempted to bring the song together using a digital 8-track studio. He later worked on the song's lyrics and posted it onto the internet. The writing process of "Never Ending" began in November 2013, and started again in April 2014 at which time Rihanna became interested in the track and wanted to record it. English singer-songwriter Dido is also credited as a writer on the track due to a similarity in the melody of "Never Ending" and Dido's 1999 song "Thank You."

The only song which was recorded outside of the United States was "Same Ol' Mistakes"; the track was recorded at the Twin Studios in Paris. Rihanna's team contacted Tame Impala's management and informed them that Rihanna loved the band's song "New Person, Same Old Mistakes" and asked if she could re-record the track for Anti. The song's writer, Kevin Parker, agreed and gave Rihanna permission to record the song. After hearing Rihanna's version, Parker stated, "We're all really happy with how the song turned out, love it!".

== Vocal production ==
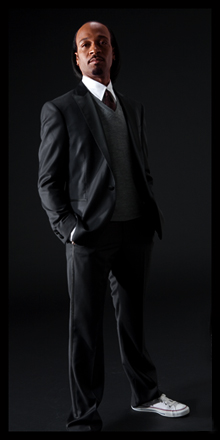
American vocal producer Kuk Harrell did the complete vocal production on Anti.

American vocal producer Kuk Harrell, who has been working with Rihanna since 2007, stated that for Anti, Rihanna was creatively more involved in the making process. Harrell stated that she aimed to push the album in the direction she envisioned. The producer stated his attempt to move away from mainstream pop music when producing the album's vocals, "Every record... is a record that somebody else could've done... It's so awesome that she... was courageous enough to... do that."

Harrell noted that with the production of Anti Rihanna was far more meticulous about what she wanted each individual line to sound like. He stated that he attempted to work quickly when producing the album, however Rihanna wanted to constantly improve the album's quality stating, "let's up the quality level. Let's make sure... it's a masterpiece." Harrell stated that when he and Rihanna had previously worked together they aimed to make a great body of work, however on Anti they aimed to create a "masterpiece".

Speaking of the album's production and style, Harrell stated that artists such as Rihanna have been taking a stance and stepping away from the popular music of the time and the expectations of her label, directors, and radio, stating, "I don't want to make what everybody else is making... I know my fans will love it... if everybody else loves it, great. If they don't, at least I know... I've done what I want to do." Anti was engineered by Nathaniel Alford, Chris Godbey, Harrell, Blake Mares, Daniela Rivera and Marcos Tovar. The album was finally mastered by Chris Gehringer at Sterling Sound, in New York City.

== Composition ==
=== Music and lyrics ===
On Anti... the focus is on that voice and her... personality, singing... as if her life depends on it.... what she has come up with is atmospheric, sexy and strangely disturbed, tapping into the kind of distorted beats and chilled tempos that burble through progressive hip hop.

— Neil McCormick, discussing the album's musical and vocal style

During the album's recording Rihanna aimed to create a record to have "soulful" and "aggressive" sounds in the musical, lyrical and vocal context. During a press conference in early 2014, Rihanna told MTV News that she aimed to depart from the musical style of her previous releases, which she described as being "big songs". Rihanna continued to state that with Anti she wanted to focus on music that "felt real" and soulful and would be timeless. She also stated that she wanted to record songs that are "timeless" and that she could perform 15 years later. "Not any songs that were burnt out. I find that when I get on stage now, I don't want to perform a lot of my songs. They don't feel like me."

Anti abandons the radio-friendly dance-pop production of Rihanna's previous hit singles. It is a genre-spanning record consisting of pop and dancehall tunes with elements of soul music. Compared to Rihanna's previous catalogue, Anti is more muted and soulful. According to Billboard, the album belongs to "the weeded-out, hazy spectrum of rap and alt-R&B". Rolling Stone described the album as psychedelic soul. Lindsay Zoladz of Vulture coined the term "industrial dancehall" as the most appropriate to describe Anti. Ben Rayner of The Toronto Star stated the album is divided into two halves; the first consisting of "futuristic robo-R&B", while the second half contains "a more organic breed of soul". The album's production has been characterized as being dark, sparsely layered, bouncy, with lo-fi bass, old school styles, downtempo moodiness and electro-soul minimalism. The bass-heavy production of Anti's midsection ("Needed Me", "Woo", "Yeah, I Said It") evokes popular hip hop and R&B genres. The second half of the album is characterised by textual minimalism. Analyzing its sound a year after its release, Da'Shan Smith of Billboard noted the album's present underscoring of trap.

The album's lyrical content predominantly touches upon themes of relationships, exploring what it means to be in love, to get hurt, to need someone, and to be true to yourself. The theme of relationships is picked up in numerous songs; "Kiss It Better" sees Rihanna questioning how far an ex-lover will go to get her back; in "Woo", Rihanna turns spiteful, stating she does not care for her ex-partner, while "Never Ending" features Rihanna admitting she would like to be in love again. The album's themes were also noted as being unapologetic, with an uncaring attitude, and self-assurance.

=== Songs ===
Anti opens with "Consideration", a dub-inspired song. The song contains a "glitchy" production and features guest vocals from singer-songwriter SZA. Neil McCormick of The Telegraph, thought the song is Rihanna turning her back on record labels and their expectations, in the line "I got to do things my own way darling". "James Joint" is a neo-soul song that contains "keyboards built over rising bass riffs that create a thickly textured groove." The song was compared to the work of Stevie Wonder, due to the use of a harmonica. "Kiss It Better" is a pop power ballad inspired by the music of the '80s and '90s. Built over deep synths the track features an electric guitar and lyrics that focus on a destructive relationship that the singer knows is wrong for her, but one she finds irresistible. "Work", which features Canadian rapper Drake, is a reggae-pop song with a "percolating beat, sinuous synth lines, and vocal samples stretched and pulled in a way that recalls Jimmy Jam and Terry Lewis's production work on Janet Jackson's 1997 album The Velvet Rope." "Desperado" is a moody, trap-country song containing a "mid-tempo groove, bell ringing and shuddering drums, along with deep synths and vocal samples."

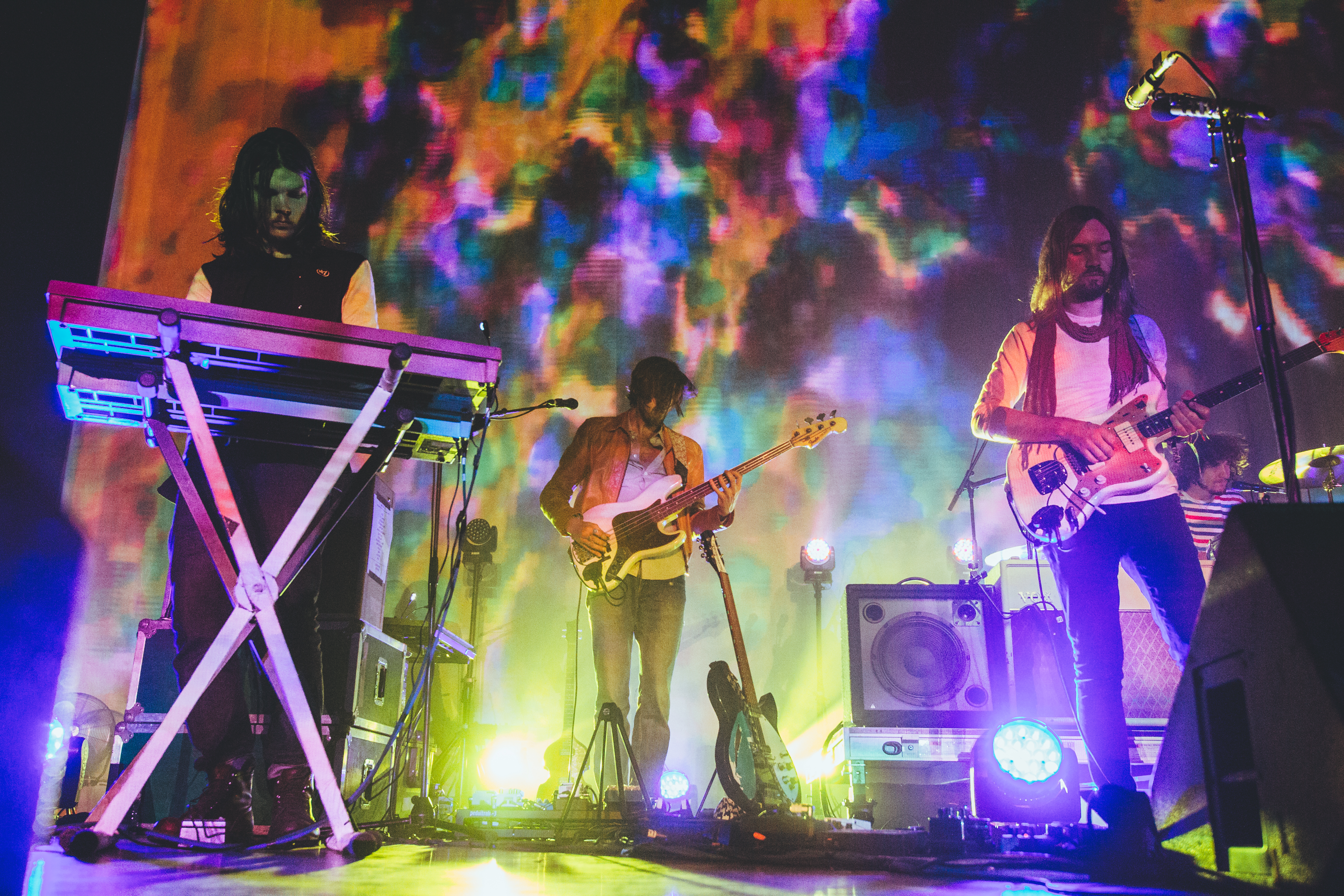
"Same Ol' Mistakes" is a cover version of "New Person, Same Old Mistakes" (2015) performed by Tame Impala, written by Kevin Parker.

The sixth track "Woo" opens with "two jarring, atonal guitar chords repeated along with small, trap-influenced percussion, over a basic riff." It was compared to the work of Kanye West due to its slow stomping, distortion, and lack of melody and groove. "Needed Me" is a downtempo song, with small elements of electro bubble, synthetic sounds, and a loose, casual vocal that discusses romantic rejection, while the following song "Yeah, I Said It" continues the trend of containing a slowed down groove. "Same Ol' Mistakes" is a cover version of "New Person, Same Old Mistakes" (2015) performed by Tame Impala. The song contains the same production as the original, featuring a "fluid sound, with elements of psychedelic, hip-hop and pop rock genres, along with a slow, dreamy, psychedelic synth groove." "Never Ending" is a guitar-led song, with elements of country music, organic melodies and backing vocals.

"Love on the Brain" is a mid-tempo '50s inspired doo-wop ballad "that features a guitar arpeggio, swirling organ, simple chord progression and backing vocals". Rihanna's vocals on the track were noted as being acrobatic and ranging from her "trademark snarl", to high notes, with dark lyrics that depict a destructive, yet addictive relationship. "Higher" is a love song that has a woozy production that contains lyrics about Rihanna's feelings towards her lover whilst she is under the influence of drugs and alcohol. "Close to You" is a slow piano ballad, which is sung in a jazz style. The deluxe version of Anti contains three more songs. The first is "Goodnight Gotham", which contains a sample of "Only If for a Night" (2011) performed by Florence and the Machine and hears Rihanna singing along with the "looping" sample. The following track "Pose" features a grimy beat, along with the singer aggressively boasting about her riches. "Sex with Me" contains dreamy production which hears Rihanna talking about her beauty, "before closing with a trippy blend of vocals."

== Title and packaging ==
If They Let Us

"I sometimes fear that I am misunderstood.
It is simply because what I want to say,
what I need to say, won't be heard.
Heard in a way I so rightfully deserve.
What I choose to say is of so much substance
That people just won't understand the depth of my message.
So my voice is not my weakness,
It is the opposite of what others are afraid of.
My voice is my suit and armor,
My shield, and all that I am.
I will comfortably breathe in it, until I find the moment to be silent.
I live loudly in my mind, so many hours of the day.
The world is pin drop sound compared to the boom
That thumps and bumps against the walls of my cranium.
I live it and love it and despise it and I am entrapped in it.
So being misunderstood, I am not offended by the gesture, but honored.
If they let us..."

— Rihanna and Chloe Mitchell, a reading of the album's artwork poem

On 7 October 2015, Rihanna held a private viewing for fans and press at Los Angeles' MAMA Gallery, where she debuted the album's official artwork and title. Initially thought to have been entitled R8, Rihanna announced the official title during the album's cover art release, revealing the album would be called ANTI. The exhibition included a piece of art which defined the album's title, stating that anti is "a person opposed to a particular policy, activity, or idea." Following the exhibition, Rihanna took to social media to confirm the album's title along with an explanation of its meaning. The explanation stated, "By continuing to follow her own instincts, her work strives to make an impact by doing the very antithesis of what the public expects."

The artwork was designed by Israeli artist Roy Nachum, and was described by Rihanna as her "favorite album cover". The album's front cover shows a younger Rihanna holding a black balloon, with a gold crown covering her eyes. The majority of the artwork is black and white with a "smattering" of red paint. Speaking about the cover art's concept, Nachum stated that he painted a young Rihanna to represent her "bringing something new" to music.

Over the red, black, and white canvas, there is a poem written in Braille by poet Chloe Mitchell. Speaking on her choice to use the script, Rihanna commented, "Sometimes the ones who have sight are the blindest." During the cover's designing stage, Rihanna met with Mitchell, in which they "drank" and came up with a poem that would be used for the artwork and liner notes entitled If They Let Us. Mitchell explained the poem and its meaning to Rolling Stone magazine, stating it was about being misunderstood, but still being able to stand out while doing what is right for you. She further said that the poem speaks about not conforming to society and being a leader as well as accepting that being misunderstood is a positive thing.

At the gallery, the album's back cover, along with multiple inside album artworks were revealed. The album's back cover features the same image this time from behind. The seven pieces of artwork were all named and featured a poem written by Mitchell or Nachum, the front and back covers were titled "If They Let Us Part I" and "If They Let Us Part II" and featured a poem that was split over the front and back. Another piece entitled "If They Let Us" was commissioned and featured the full reading of the poem. The inside booklet contains a further five pieces entitled "Fire Part I", "Fire Part II", "Fire Part III" and "R". Billboard ranked the artwork as one of the best covers of the albums released in 2016 and wrote, "What's black and white and red all over? One of the most intoxicating albums of any genre in 2016, with an equally indelible lead image to match."

== Singles ==
"Work" featuring Canadian rapper Drake was released on January 27, 2016, hours before the Tidal release of Anti. Rihanna stated on Twitter that the song is the "first single" from her album. "Work" debuted at number nine on the US Billboard Hot 100 chart. It became Rihanna's 27th top ten hit. With this feat, Rihanna tied Mariah Carey, Janet Jackson and Elton John as the artists with fifth-most top ten songs on the chart. The singer reached 27 top ten singles on the Hot 100 in a span of 10 years and eight months between her first song, "Pon de Replay" and "Work" and became the fastest solo artist to reach the plateau. In its fourth week, "Work" peaked at number one on the Hot 100 chart and became Rihanna's fourteenth number-one song in the United States and the 1,052nd number-one single on the chart overall. Subsequently, she became the artist with the fourth-most number-one songs on the chart following the Beatles with 20 and Carey with 19, and Elvis Presley with 17. She broke a tie with Michael Jackson, who had reached 13 chart-toppers on the Billboard Hot 100.

On March 29, 2016, Rihanna announced that "Needed Me" and "Kiss It Better" would both be serviced to radio the following day as the album's second and third singles. "Needed Me" saw far greater success becoming Rihanna's 28th top ten single on the Hot 100, tying her with Stevie Wonder for fourth place as the acts with the most top tens in Billboard history. It notably became her longest charting Hot 100 hit, surpassing the 41-week run of "We Found Love". "Kiss It Better" was a moderate success charting at the lower end of the US Billboard Hot 100, initially released as the promotional focus at pop radio, "Kiss It Better" reached as far as number twenty-four on the Pop Songs chart, leading Roc Nation to release "Needed Me"—an initially "urban radio priority"—to pop radio as well, due to its success.

On August 21, 2016, Rihanna announced via her Instagram account that "Love on the Brain" will be the next single. Prior to being announced as a single, "Love on the Brain" debuted on the US Billboard Hot R&B/Hip-Hop Songs at number 30 and charted on the Billboard Hot 100, debuting at number 83. After being released as a single, the song re-entered the Billboard Hot 100 chart at number 80. The song peaked at number five, becoming the third top ten single from Anti, as well as her twenty-second top five hit.

== Release and promotion ==
Rihanna started a social media promotional campaign with the hashtag "#R8" as early as summer 2014; her social media posts included pictures taken with record producers in studios. From January to April 2015, Rihanna released three singles—"FourFiveSeconds" featuring Kanye West and Paul McCartney, "Bitch Better Have My Money", and "American Oxygen"—none of which made the track listing of Anti. Rihanna also posted an interlude entitled "James Joint" in its entirety from the upcoming album on her website on 21 April 2015, as a "celebration of 420". In May 2015, "Goodnight Gotham", then referred to as "A Night", was included in an advertisement campaign for Dior. In October 2015, it was revealed that Rihanna had acquired the masters to all her recordings and would be releasing Anti jointly through her own record label Westbury Road and Roc Nation.

In November 2015, it was announced that Rihanna had signed a $25 million contract with Samsung to not only promote the Galaxy line of products, but to also sponsor the release of Anti and its supporting tour. On 19 November 2015, Rihanna and Samsung released a 16-second cryptic video for Anti, launching a website for Rihanna's forthcoming album entitled "ANTIdiaRy". Upon launch, the mobile-only site gave messages, such as "She's waiting for you. Are you in?" and "Be patient and keep your eyes open". The website then proceeded to launch eight "rooms" over the following 9 weeks, each loosely corresponding to her previous albums, detailing her personal life over the course of her career and including clues from Anti. In the same month, she canceled her performance at the Victoria's Secret Fashion Show to finish work on Anti.

The Anti World Tour was announced on 23 November 2015. The Samsung-sponsored tour started in March 2016 and ended in November 2016, with Travis Scott supporting in North America, and Big Sean supporting at selected European dates. The album leaked onto the internet in its entirety on 27 January 2016, after it was released prematurely on music streaming service Tidal. Also through Tidal, one million copies of the album were made available for free download via Samsung, regardless of whether a listener is a Tidal subscriber or not. The album was released officially worldwide on online stores, like iTunes, two days later.

== Critical reception ==
Professional ratings
Aggregate scores
Source	Rating
AnyDecentMusic?	6.7/10
Metacritic	73/100
Review scores
Source	Rating
AllMusic	5/5 stars
The Daily Telegraph	3/5 stars
Entertainment Weekly	A−
The Guardian	3/5 stars
The Independent	4/5 stars
NME	3/5 stars
Pitchfork	7.7/10
Rolling Stone	4/5 stars
Spin	7/10
Vice	A

Anti received generally positive reviews from music critics, but critics were more mixed over its sound and Rihanna's artistic direction. At Metacritic, which assigns a normalised rating out of 100 to reviews from professional publications, Anti received an average score of 73 out of 100, indicating "generally favorable reviews", based on 31 reviews. The aggregate site AnyDecentMusic? assigned it a score of 6.7 out of 10, based on their assessment of the critical consensus.

Many critics noted Anti as an experimental record compared to Rihanna's previous market-oriented pop albums. Those unimpressed took issue with the absence of radio-friendly songs and deemed the album half-hearted and disorienting, but those complimentary said it represented Rihanna's artistic maturity as an album artist, transcending her previous image as a pop star with serial hit singles. Alexis Petridis in The Guardian and Jon Caramanica in The New York Times described Anti as a frustrating record without a clear artistic vision. Writing for Vice, Robert Christgau lauded the album's catchy production despite its rejection of the formulaic pop song structure. In Spin, Jia Tolentino was somewhat disappointed by the unfocused track list, but welcomed Anti as a sign of artistic evolution: "For once, Rihanna is drawing on whims rather than characters, uncertainties rather than pronouncements, her own desires rather than the desires of her audience."

Critics highlighted the diverse musical styles and honest emotional sentiments as a testament to Rihanna's newfound artistic freedom. Some, including Neil McCormick of The Daily Telegraph, deemed the experimentation proved Rihanna no longer expected to monetise her music. In Rolling Stone, Brittany Spanos remarked that with Anti, after a decade of releasing chart hits, Rihanna was finally "in charge of her own sound, remaking pop on her own terms". Though some remarked that the album was self-assured and confident, Amanda Petrusich writing for Pitchfork appreciated Rihanna's newfound introspection and vulnerability, calling it "a fun and conflicted pop record, at its most interesting when it's at its smallest and most idiosyncratic". The Los Angeles Times critic Mikael Wood similarly commended her inward vision, specifically through the second half's balladry, for "pushing back against her established image" as a flippant pop star. Writing for The Independent, Emily Jupp found the record abundant with Rihanna's self-confidence and underrated singing, disproving "anyone who ever said her voice could only do certain things and showing them she can do anything she wants to."

== Accolades ==
Anti won the award for Favorite Soul/R&B Album at the 2016 American Music Awards. The record received a nomination for Top R&B Album at the 2016 and 2017 Billboard Music Awards and was also nominated for Best Urban Contemporary Album and Best Recording Package at the 59th Annual Grammy Awards. Prior to the Grammy nominations announcement, media outlets predicted that Anti would be nominated for Album of the Year; following the announcement reporters were surprised and felt that the album had been "snubbed". Fellow musicians also believed that the album should have been nominated, with Chance the Rapper stating that the album was "underrated". Apart from Anti's nominations, several songs from it were also nominated including "Work" for Record of the Year and Best Pop Duo/Group Performance, "Needed Me" for Best R&B Performance and "Kiss It Better" for Best R&B Song. At the 2017 iHeartRadio Music Awards Anti received the award for 'R&B Album of the Year'.

According to Metacritic, it was the 12th most prominently ranked album of 2016. NME considered it the 40th best album of the year. On their list of 50 Best Albums of 2016, Rolling Stone placed the album at number 25 and wrote, "Rihanna's long-simmering eighth album brought together stinging songs that showcased the pop provocateur's ever-widening range, both stylistically and vocally." The Independent's Roisin O'Connor ranked the album at number 15 out of 20 music releases of 2016 and wrote, "Anti was the moment Rihanna finally asserted herself as an album artist, after reigning as queen of the singles charts for so many years." The Billboard Staff placed the album at number 11 on their list 50 Best Albums of 2016. Jamieson Cox of Time ranked the record at number seven on their list The Top 10 Best Albums for 2016 and wrote, "Rihanna might be the most charismatic person on the planet, and Anti is her first album to recognize that said charisma is her greatest strength." Christgau ranked its deluxe version as the second best album of the year in his ballot for The Village Voice's annual Pazz & Jop critics poll.

Lewis Corner of Digital Spy ranked the album at number seven on his list of 20 best albums of 2016. Same as Corner, Harriet Gibsone of The Guardian also ranked the album at number seven deeming it as one of the "messiest album releases", but also a record that show that Rihanna is one of the greatest music rock stars. In their mid-year report, Entertainment Weekly placed Anti at number four on the list of The 25 best albums of 2016. For the publication, Leah Greenblatt wrote, "Anti's wild, woozy R&B easily earned 24-karat status all on its own." On their final Best Albums of 2016 list, the publication ranked the album at number three and called it "The Emancipation of RiRi", a reference to Mariah Carey's tenth studio album, The Emancipation of Mimi. Rap-Up additionally placed it at number three on their list of 20 Best Albums of 2016. Fuse ranked Anti at number one on their list The 20 Best Albums of 2016, highlighting the sounds of the album, Rihanna's vocals and the celebration of womanhood. The Fader recognized the release as one of the 24 Albums That Made Albums Matter Again in 2016 and included four songs of the album in their "The Best Songs of 2016" list: "Sex with Me" at number one, "Work" at number 16, "Higher" at number 36 and "Needed Me" at 51. According to Metacritic, Anti was the eighth most mentioned album on the Best of the Decade Top 10 Album lists. Some of the publications ranking the album as one of the best of the 2010s decade are:

Decade-end lists
Publication	List	Rank	Ref.
The A.V. Club	The 50 Best Albums of the 2010s	48	
Billboard	The 100 Greatest Albums of the 2010s	7	
Consequence of Sound	The 100 Top Albums of the 2010s	81	
The Guardian	The 100 Best Albums of the 21st Century (2000–2019)	99	
The Independent	The 50 Best Albums of the Decade	20	
NME	The 100 Best Albums of the 2010s	7	
Paste	The 100 Best Albums of the 2010s	35	
Pitchfork	The 200 Best Albums of the 2010s	12	
Rolling Stone	The 100 Best Albums of the 2010s	25	
Rolling Stone	The 250 Greatest Albums of the 21st Century So Far	21	
SPIN	The 101 Best Albums of the 2010s	1	

== Commercial performance ==
=== United States ===
In the United States, the Recording Industry Association of America (RIAA) certified Anti platinum denoting one million copies sold two days after its release, brought by Samsung purchasing one million copies and giving them away as a free download, as part of the November 2015 deal. The album debuted at number 27 on the Billboard 200 chart with 16,000 album-equivalent units first week dated 13 February 2016. Despite its first-week sales of 1.4 million downloads, Billboard did not recognize free album sales via promotions. According to data provider Nielsen SoundScan for Billboard, recognized first-week of Anti included 4.7 million streams and 126,000 digital songs. The following week, the album topped the Top R&B/Hip-Hop Albums chart and the Billboard 200, marking Rihanna's second number one on the latter.

Anti peaked atop the Billboard 200 for two non-consecutive weeks, claiming the top spot on the chart week ending 2 April 2016. The same week, its lead single "Work" topped the Billboard Hot 100, marking Rihanna's second time topping both the Billboard 200 and Hot 100 charts simultaneously; Unapologetic and "Diamonds" topped the charts in December 2012. According to Nielsen SoundScan, Anti was the ninth-best-selling album and the fourth-most-consumed album of 2016 in the United States, amassing 603,000 pure sales, 4.195 million song downloads, and over 1.4 billion streams.

On the issue dated February 25, 2023, the album returned to the top ten of the Billboard 200 at number 8 with 36,000 units, following her Super Bowl LVII halftime performance. Later that year, the RIAA certified Anti six times platinum, marking six million album-equivalent units based on sales and streaming. By December 2025, Anti became the first album by a black female artist to spend 500 weeks on the Billboard 200, and become the fourth longest charting female album in Billboard 200 history.

=== Other markets ===
Anti topped the albums charts in Canada and Norway. In the United Kingdom, the album peaked at number seven on the UK Albums Chart and number one on the UK R&B Chart; In 2025, the British Phonographic Industry (BPI) certified Anti double platinum for surpassing 600,000 units. The album peaked within the top five of albums charts in many European countries, reaching number two in Ireland, Sweden and Switzerland; number three in Denmark, Germany and the Netherlands; number four in Greece and Spain; and number five in the Czech Republic and Finland. It received multi-platinum certifications in France (double platinum) and Denmark (5× platinum). Anti was the most-streamed album by a female artist on Spotify of 2016 worldwide. According to the International Federation of the Phonographic Industry (IFPI), it sold over one million copies worldwide in 2016. According to Billboard, the album sold 11 million in album-equivalent units as of 2021.

== Legacy ==
Doreen St. Félix of MTV News stated that Anti was a "rock-star" album and was noted as a "banner for heterogeneity in R&B — the real range of it," continuing to state that in the early 2010s EDM was the popular genre. St. Félix stated in a more in-depth review that "Anti could even change with the seasons, depending on which tracks you chose to listen to." Alexis Petridis of The Guardian stated that R&B was in a "golden age" and 2016 "was its most potent year yet". Petridis stated that artists such as Rihanna pushed the genre's "boundaries", noting that Anti was "sprawling, exploratory and opaque". The album's commercial performance, especially its streaming performance, was noted as helping R&B "flourish" again, along with Drake and Kanye West. Rihanna was cited as the second most streamed artist of 2016 overall, earning 795 million streams by June and was named the most streamed female of 2016 and 2017 by Spotify. Anti produced eight songs that topped the Billboard Dance Club Songs chart — "Work", "Kiss It Better", "Needed Me", "Love on the Brain", "Sex with Me", "Pose", "Desperado" and "Consideration" — surpassing Katy Perry's Teenage Dream (2010) as the album with the most number-one songs on that chart.

Rolling Stone's journalist Brittany Spanos stated that Rihanna was one of three black women, alongside Beyoncé and Solange, who "radicalized Pop in 2016". In an in-depth review, Spanos stated "the album is a startlingly direct statement from a black female pop star, one that many are not afforded the opportunity to express. In the media, black women are often cast as either jezebels or mammies – oversexed or undersexed with no choice as to how they are received. Rihanna's resistance to typecasting and her positive affirmation of her sexual agency made her the year's slyest rebel, a maverick living life as she pleases." Taj Rani of Billboard stated "Work" has brought the genre of dancehall to the forefront of American music, as it became the first dancehall song to top the Billboard Hot 100 since Sean Paul's "Temperature" reached the feat in 2006. She opined the song is a prime example of "an unapologetic black woman proudly showing her heritage at a time when our politics are dominated by #BlackLivesMatter and Donald Trump's racist, xenophobic and misogynistic tirades." Da'Shan Smith of Billboard stated "Love on the Brain" became the most subtly influential pop single of 2017, as the music industry experienced "a prominent surge of retro-harkening balladry, across different musical genres", following the success of this song on pop radio; which he described as "a rare find today, because traditional R&B's presence on the format is an oddity."

Marilyn Manson cited Anti as an influence on his band's album Heaven Upside Down, saying: "Strangely enough, one of the records that influenced this album strongly, and it can't be taken literally, is Rihanna, her last record. That one song, 'Love on the Brain', it really hit me because I saw her perform it and she just... meant it." Album track "Higher" inspired the song "Liability" from New Zealand singer Lorde's second album Melodrama (2017), when Lorde was reportedly "moved to tears" listening to "Higher" and this helped her to write "Liability". Contemporary artist Awol Erizku created a series of pieces inspired by musicians, one of the pieces was titled, "Same Ol' Mistakes," inspired by the song of the same name from the album Anti. Referencing one of Rihanna's logos, Erizku spoke of how the song inspired his artwork, stating: "I always thought that logo was really funny. It's one aspect of pop culture that I thought fit in my world, Rihanna is a voice of our generation, one of our ideals of beauty. You can see these two things co-existing in the same environment." In 2020, Rolling Stone ranked Anti at number 230 on their The 500 Greatest Albums of All Time list.

== Track listing ==
Credits adapted from Rihanna's official website.

Standard edition
No.	Title	Writer(s)	Producer(s)	Length
1.	"Consideration" (featuring SZA)	Solána Rowe; Tyran Donaldson; Robyn Fenty	Scum; Kuk Harrell^{[c]}	2:41
2.	"James Joint"	Robert Taylor; James Fauntleroy; Fenty	Shea Taylor; Harrell^{[c]}	1:12
3.	"Kiss It Better"	Jeff Bhasker; John Glass; Teddy Sinclair; Fenty	Bhasker; Glass John^{[b]}; Harrell^{[c]}	4:13
4.	"Work" (featuring Drake)	Jahron Braithwaite; Matthew Samuels; Allen Ritter; Rupert Thomas; Aubrey Graham; Fenty; Monte Moir	Boi-1da; Harrell^{[c]}; Noah "40" Shebib^{[c]}	3:39
5.	"Desperado"	Krystin "Rook Monroe" Watkins; Mick Schultz; Fenty; Fauntleroy; Derrus Rachel	Schultz; Harrell^{[c]}	3:06
6.	"Woo"	Chauncey Hollis; Jacques Webster; Jeremy Felton; Abel Tesfaye; Fenty; Terius Nash; Rachel; Jean Baptiste	Hit-Boy; Travis Scott^{[b]}; Harrell^{[c]}	3:55
7.	"Needed Me"	Dijon McFarlane; Fenty; Nick Audino; Lewis Hughes; Khaled Rohaim; Te Warbrick; Adam Feeney; Brittany Hazzard; Charles Hinshaw; Rachel	DJ Mustard; Twice as Nice^{[a]}; Frank Dukes^{[a]}; Harrell^{[c]}	3:11
8.	"Yeah, I Said It"	Timothy Mosley; Bibi Bourelly; Evon Barnes; Daniel Jones; Chris Godbey; Jean-Paul Bourelly; Fenty	Timbaland; Fade Majah; Jones; Harrell^{[c]}	2:13
9.	"Same Ol' Mistakes"	Kevin Parker	Parker; Harrell^{[c]}	6:37
10.	"Never Ending"	Paul Herman; Chad Sabo; Fenty; Dido Armstrong	Sabo; Harrell^{[c]}	3:22
11.	"Love on the Brain"	Fred Ball; Joseph Angel; Fenty	Ball; Harrell^{[c]}	3:44
12.	"Higher"	Ernest Wilson; B. Bourelly; Fenty; Fauntleroy; Jerry Butler; Kenny Gamble; Leon Huff	No I.D; Harrell^{[c]}	2:00
13.	"Close to You"	Brian Seals; Fauntleroy; Fenty	Brian Kennedy; Harrell^{[c]}	3:43
Total length:				43:36

Deluxe edition
No.	Title	Writer(s)	Producer(s)	Length
14.	"Goodnight Gotham"	Paul Epworth; Florence Welch; Fenty; C. Boggs	Mitus; Harrell^{[c]}	1:28
15.	"Pose"	Hollis; B. Bourelly; Fenty; Webster	Hit-Boy; Scott^{[b]}; Harrell^{[c]}	2:24
16.	"Sex with Me"	Braithwaite; Samuels; Feeney; Anderson Hernandez; Chester Hansen; Fenty	Boi-1da; Dukes^{[a]}; Vinylz^{[b]}; Harrell^{[c]}	3:26
Total length:				50:54

=== Notes ===
- ^{^[a]} signifies a co-producer
- ^{^[b]} signifies an additional producer
- ^{^[c]} signifies a vocal producer
- "Work" features additional vocals by PartyNextDoor.
- "Desperado" features additional background vocals by James Fauntleroy.
- "Woo" features additional vocals by Travis Scott.

=== Sample credits ===
- "Work" contains a sample of "If You Were Here Tonight" (1985) performed by Alexander O'Neal, written by Monte Moir.
- "Same Ol' Mistakes" is a cover version of "New Person, Same Old Mistakes" (2015) performed by Tame Impala, written by Kevin Parker.
- "Never Ending" contains samples from the composition "Thank You" (2000) performed by Dido, written by Dido Armstrong and Paul Herman.
- "Higher" contains elements from "Beside You" (1970) performed by the Soulful Strings, written by Jerry Butler, Kenny Gamble and Leon Huff.
- "Goodnight Gotham" contains a sample of "Only If for a Night" (2011) performed by Florence and the Machine, written by Paul Epworth and Florence Welch.

== Personnel ==
Credits are adapted from Rihanna's website.

Performers and musicians

- Rihanna – vocals and songwriting
- SZA – vocals (track 1)
- Drake – vocals (track 4)
- Joseph Angel – keyboards (track 11), drums (track 11)
- Fred Ball – keyboards (track 11), drums (track 11)
- Nuno Bettencourt – guitar (track 3)
- James Fauntleroy – additional backing vocals (track 5)
- Brian Kennedy – keyboards (track 13)
- Carter Lang – organ (track 1), synth bass (track 1)
- No I.D. – keyboards (track 12)
- Kevin Parker – all instruments (track 9)
- PartyNextDoor – additional vocals (track 4)
- Brian Schultz – bass guitar (track 5)
- Mick Schultz – guitar (track 5)
- Travis Scott – additional vocals (track 6)
- Shea Taylor – keyboards (tracks 1–2)

Production

- Nathaniel Alford – additional engineering (track 6)
- Joseph Angel – arrangements (track 11)
- Fred Ball – production (track 11)
- Jeff Bhasker – production (track 3)
- Ray C. Brown Jr. – assistant (tracks 6, 8, 10, 12–13)
- Boi-1da – production (tracks 4, 16)
- Noel Cadastre – recording (track 4), mixing (track 4)
- Frank Dukes – co-production (tracks 7, 16)
- DJ Mustard – production (track 7)
- James Fauntleroy – additional vocal arrangement (track 5)
- Chris Galland – assistant mixing (tracks 1, 3, 5–7, 9–16)
- Chris Gehringer – mastering
- Chris Godbey – additional recording (track 8), mixing (track 8)
- Stan Greene – music recording (track 10), music mixing (track 10)
- Kuk Harrell – vocal production, recording (tracks 1–6)
- Hit-Boy – production (tracks 6, 15)
- Jeff Jackson – assistant mixing (track 11)
- Glass John – additional production (track 3)
- Daniel Jones – production (track 8)
- Brian Kennedy – production (track 13)
- Etienne Macor – assistant (track 9)
- Fade Majah – production (track 8)
- Blake Mares – assistant (tracks 2–3, 14), additional recording (tracks 7, 16)
- Manny Marroquin – mixing (tracks 1–7, 9, 11–16)
- Mitus – production (track 14)
- Brendan Morawski – assistant (tracks 1, 3)
- No I.D. – production (track 12)
- Kevin Parker – production (track 9), music mixing (track 9)
- Rihanna – executive production
- Daniela Rivera – additional engineering (track 10)
- Chad Sabo – production (track 10), music recording (track 10), music mixing (track 10)
- Ike Schultz – assistant mixing (tracks 3, 5–7, 9–16)
- Mick Schultz – production (track 5)
- Travis Scott – additional production (tracks 6, 15)
- Scum – production (track 1)
- Noah "40" Shebib – vocal production (track 4), recording (track 4), mixing (track 4)
- Phil Tan – mixing (track 10)
- Shea Taylor – production (track 2)
- Timbaland – production (track 8)
- Marcos Tovar – recording
- Twice As Nice – co-production (track 7)
- Vinylz – additional production (track 16)
- Thomas Warren – assistant (tracks 4–5, 7, 15–16)
- Krystin "Rook Monroe" Watkins – additional vocal arrangement (track 5)
- Chad Wilson – assistant (tracks 10, 16)

Design and management

- Chloe Mitchell – poetry
- Roy Nachum – artwork, poetry
- Ciara Parrdo – creative direction
- Rihanna – creative direction, poetry

== Charts ==
=== Weekly charts ===
Chart (2016)	Peak position
Australian Albums (ARIA)	5
Austrian Albums (Ö3 Austria)	7
Belgian Albums (Ultratop Flanders)	8
Belgian Albums (Ultratop Wallonia)	8
Brazilian Albums (ABPD)	8
Canadian Albums (Billboard)	1
Czech Albums (ČNS IFPI)	5
Danish Albums (Hitlisten)	3
Dutch Albums (Album Top 100)	3
Finnish Albums (Suomen virallinen lista)	5
French Albums (SNEP)	6
German Albums (Offizielle Top 100)	3
Greek Albums (IFPI)	4
Hungarian Albums (MAHASZ)	16
Irish Albums (IRMA)	2
Italian Albums (FIMI)	10
Japanese Hot Albums (Billboard)	22
Japanese Albums (Oricon)	10
Mexican Albums (AMPROFON)	16
New Zealand Albums (RMNZ)	5
Norwegian Albums (VG-lista)	1
Polish Albums (ZPAV)	6
Portuguese Albums (AFP)	11
Scottish Albums (Official Charts)	7
Slovak Albums (ČNS IFPI)	27
South African Albums (RISA)	8
South Korean Albums (Gaon)	26
South Korean International Albums (Gaon)	2
Spanish Albums (Promusicae)	4
Swedish Albums (Sverigetopplistan)	2
Swiss Albums (Schweizer Hitparade)	2
Taiwanese Albums (Five Music)	3
UK Albums (Official Charts)	7
UK R&B Albums (Official Charts)	1
US Billboard 200	1
US Top R&B/Hip-Hop Albums (Billboard)	1

Chart (2026)	Peak position
US Independent Albums (Billboard)	10

=== Monthly charts ===
Chart (2016)	Position
Argentine Monthly Albums (CAPIF)	5

=== Year-end charts ===
Chart (2016)	Position
Australian Albums (ARIA)	64
Belgian Albums (Ultratop Flanders)	71
Belgian Albums (Ultratop Wallonia)	82
Canadian Albums (Billboard)	6
Danish Albums (Hitlisten)	6
Dutch Albums (Album Top 100)	17
French Albums (SNEP)	41
German Albums (Offizielle Top 100)	75
Icelandic Albums (Tónlistinn)	29
Italian Albums (FIMI)	81
New Zealand Albums (RMNZ)	19
Polish Albums (ZPAV)	87
Spanish Albums (PROMUSICAE)	71
Swedish Albums (Sverigetopplistan)	5
Swiss Albums (Schweizer Hitparade)	35
UK Albums (Official Charts)	32
US Billboard 200	5
US R&B Albums (Billboard)	2
US Top R&B/Hip-Hop Albums (Billboard)	3

Chart (2017)	Position
Canadian Albums (Billboard)	33
Danish Albums (Hitlisten)	27
Dutch Albums (Album Top 100)	75
French Albums (SNEP)	141
Icelandic Albums (Tónlistinn)	24
New Zealand Albums (RMNZ)	28
Swedish Albums (Sverigetopplistan)	63
US Billboard 200	23
US R&B Albums (Billboard)	4
US Top R&B/Hip-Hop Albums (Billboard)	16

Chart (2018)	Position
Danish Albums (Hitlisten)	67
Icelandic Albums (Tónlistinn)	86
US Billboard 200	94
US R&B Albums (Billboard)	11
US Top R&B/Hip-Hop Albums (Billboard)	85

Chart (2019)	Position
US Billboard 200	127
US R&B Albums (Billboard)	16

Chart (2020)	Position
US Billboard 200	153
US R&B Albums (Billboard)	21

Chart (2021)	Position
Belgian Albums (Ultratop Flanders)	196
US Billboard 200	119
US R&B Albums (Billboard)	14

Chart (2022)	Position
Belgian Albums (Ultratop Flanders)	172
Danish Albums (Hitlisten)	94
Icelandic Albums (Tónlistinn)	72
US Billboard 200	129
US R&B Albums (Billboard)	15

Chart (2023)	Position
Australian Albums (ARIA)	95
Belgian Albums (Ultratop Flanders)	128
Belgian Albums (Ultratop Wallonia)	198
Danish Albums (Hitlisten)	83
Icelandic Albums (Tónlistinn)	51
New Zealand Albums (RMNZ)	41
US Billboard 200	55
US Top R&B/Hip-Hop Albums (Billboard)	29

Chart (2024)	Position
Belgian Albums (Ultratop Flanders)	131
Belgian Albums (Ultratop Wallonia)	194
Danish Albums (Hitlisten)	87
Icelandic Albums (Tónlistinn)	92
US Billboard 200	89
US Top R&B/Hip-Hop Albums (Billboard)	30

Chart (2025)	Position
Belgian Albums (Ultratop Flanders)	199
US Billboard 200	122
US Top R&B/Hip-Hop Albums (Billboard)	51

=== Decade-end charts ===
Chart (2010–2019)	Position
Norwegian Albums (VG-lista)	40
US Billboard 200	29

=== All-time chart ===
Chart (1963–2017)	Position
US Billboard 200 (Women)	38

== Certifications and sales ==
Certifications and sales for Anti
Region	Certification	Certified units/sales
Australia (ARIA)	2× Platinum	140,000^{‡}
Austria (IFPI Austria)	Platinum	15,000^{*}
Belgium (BRMA)	2× Platinum	60,000^{‡}
Canada (Music Canada)	4× Platinum	320,000^{‡}
Denmark (IFPI Danmark)	6× Platinum	120,000^{‡}
France (SNEP)	3× Platinum	300,000^{‡}
Germany (BVMI)	Gold	100,000^{‡}
Iceland (FHF)	—	3,670
Italy (FIMI)	Platinum	50,000^{‡}
Mexico (AMPROFON)	Platinum	60,000^{^}
Netherlands (NVPI)	Platinum	37,200^{‡}
New Zealand (RMNZ)	7× Platinum	105,000^{‡}
Poland (ZPAV)	3× Platinum	60,000^{‡}
Singapore (RIAS)	Gold	5,000^{*}
Sweden (GLF)	Gold	20,000^{‡}
United Kingdom (BPI)	2× Platinum	600,000^{‡}
United States (RIAA)	6× Platinum	6,000,000^{‡}
^{*} Sales figures based on certification alone.^{^} Shipments figures based on certification alone.^{‡} Sales+streaming figures based on certification alone.

== Release history ==
List of release dates, showing region, formats, label, editions and reference
Region	Date	Format(s)	Label(s)	Edition(s)	Ref.
Various	28 January 2016	Limited-release digital download; streaming; (Tidal exclusive)	Westbury Road; Roc Nation	Standard	
Various	29 January 2016	Digital download	Westbury Road; Roc Nation	Standard	
Various	29 January 2016	Digital download	Westbury Road; Roc Nation	Deluxe	
Europe	5 February 2016	CD	Westbury Road; Roc Nation	Deluxe	
Japan	10 February 2016	CD	Westbury Road; Roc Nation	Limited	
Turkey	23 February 2016	CD	Westbury Road; Roc Nation	Standard; deluxe	
Brazil	11 March 2016	CD	Universal Music Brazil	Standard; deluxe	
United States	30 September 2016	Vinyl	Westbury Road; Roc Nation	Limited	

== See also ==
- Apple Music 100 Best Albums
- List of UK R&B Albums Chart number ones of 2016
- List of Billboard 200 number-one albums of 2016
- List of Billboard number-one R&B/hip-hop albums of 2016
- List of number-one albums of 2016 (Canada)
- List of number-one albums of 2016 (Norway)
