= MAMA Gallery =

Art gallery in Los Angeles, California, United States

MAMA is a contemporary art gallery located in Los Angeles, California. MAMA's mission; to foster and exhibit contemporary artworks executed in a wide variety of media including visual installations, film, video, automata, but not excluding 'traditional' forms such as painting. MAMA was founded in 2014 by Eli Consilvio and Adarsha Benjamin. A number of its projects and programmes are rooted in popular digital, video, and street culture. The physical space closed in 2017 following a partnership dispute.

In addition to exhibitions, MAMA develops new ways of working with a range of audiences and communities through visual arts and culture.

The gallery is also notable for being the host location of Jena Malone's The Holy Other photography exhibition. In November 2014, Malone exhibited 39 photographs that she took in Myanmar in the summer of that year. The exhibition ran from November 21 to November 28, 2014. Proceeds were donated to Girl Determined, a non-profit organization which benefits girls' education in Myanmar.

In February 2015, MAMA had its inaugural solo exhibition There is No End with American visual artist James Georgopoulos and featured his large scale video sculptures.

The gallery has collaborated with other artists in a variety of artistic practices, including Rihanna, Lana Del Rey, and Daniel Johnston. MAMA also hosted creative brand experiences with Kobe Bryant, Nas, Adidas, Vans, Moet/Hennessy, and Twitter.
