= Sex with Me =

Promotional single by Rihanna

from the album Anti
- Released: February 3, 2017 (Remix EP)
- Studio: Westlake Beverly Recording Studios
- Genre: R&B
- Length: 3:26
- Label: Westbury Road; Roc Nation
- Songwriters: Jahron Brathwaite; Matthew Samuels; Adam Feeney; Anderson Hernandez; Chester Hansen; Robyn Fenty
- Producer: Boi-1da

"Sex with Me" is a song recorded by Barbadian singer Rihanna for her eighth studio album, Anti (2016); it is one of three bonus tracks included on the deluxe edition. She wrote the song in collaboration with PartyNextDoor, Chester Hansen, Boi-1da, Frank Dukes and Vinylz, and it was produced by the latter three. Kuk Harrell was also enlisted as Rihanna's vocal producer. On February 3, 2017, Rihanna released a five-track EP which included remixes of "Sex with Me" by MK, Salva, John Blake, Addal and DEVAULT.

"Sex with Me" received generally favorable reviews from critics, who praised its confidence and female empowering tones. The song was also included in Vice's "100 Best Songs of 2016" where it ranked at number two. Commercially the song performed moderately despite not being an official single. "Sex with Me" peaked at number eighty-three on the US Billboard Hot 100, and was certified platinum by the Recording Industry Association of America (RIAA). The song also became Rihanna's twenty-ninth number-one on the US Dance Club Songs. "Sex with Me" was featured on the set list of Rihanna's 2016 Anti World Tour and was unofficially remixed by various artist including Fabolous and Trey Songz.

== Writing and production ==
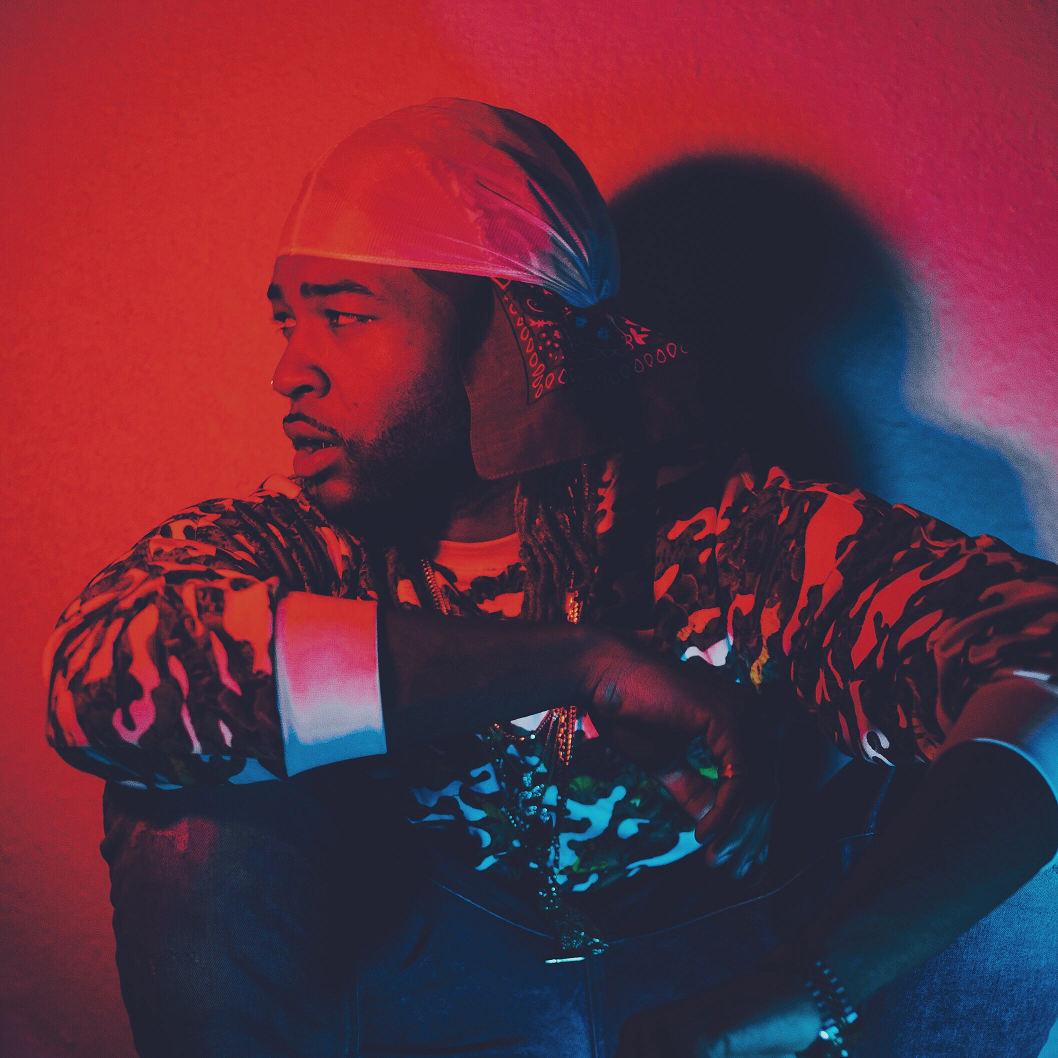
The song was co-written by PartyNextDoor.

In mid-2015, Rihanna held a writing camp at her home in Malibu, one of the writers invited was singer-songwriter Jahron Braithwaite, also known as PartyNextDoor. During his initial arrival, Braithwaite did not understand why he was asked to be there as numerous other writers had already made "hits" for Rihanna. Braithwaite went on to try and create more "streamlined songs" and moved away from his usual "looser, more experimental at-home productions". During the sessions, Braithwaite wrote two songs—the album's lead single "Work" and "Sex with Me".

"Sex with Me" is an R&B song that was written by Braithwaite, Matthew Samuels, Adam Feeney, Anderson Hernandez, Chester Hansen and Rihanna. It was produced by Boi-1da, whilst co-production was handled by Frank Dukes, with additional and vocal production being carried out by Vinylz and Kuk Harrell respectively. The song was recorded at Westlake Recording Studios in Los Angeles. The vocal recording was done by producer Kuk Harrell and Marcos Tovar, while Blake Mares served as a recording and production assistant. "Sex with Me" was mixed by Manny Marroquin at Larrabee Studios in Universal City, California and was assisted by Chris Galland and Ike Schultz. The song was mastered by Chris Gehringer at the Sterling Sound Studios in New York City.

== Release and remixes ==
Several artists have remixed the song, including Amorphous and Maino. On August 31, 2016, Fabolous and Trey Songz released a remix of the song. The remix featured a "slightly tweaked instrumental" and lyrics that boasted about their bedroom abilities. On September 3, singer-songwriter Tinashe released a remix, which featured different lyrics to the original. Nick Cannon recorded a version of the song, called "Sex with Me Is Ncredible", which was released on January 10, 2017. On February 3, 2017, Rihanna released "Sex with Me (Dance Remixes) – EP" to iTunes, the extended play featured five remixes of the original tracks. One of the tracks included a remix by Marc Kinchen and was described as a "standout" and featured a house rework.

== Critical reception ==
The song received generally favorable reviews from critics. Julianne Escobedo Shepherd of Billboard called it "the perfect denouement" of the album, stating that "Sex With Me" was the album's "most instructive track" that combatted the "misconceptions of the world's most desirably flawed Bajan badass." Jeff Benjamin of Fuse noted the song's "trippy blend of woozy vocals" and that it "appropriately ending the deluxe version of Anti in an experimental mode". Kathleen Wong from Mic called the song a "hedonistic but also girl power-inducing bass-heavy track that will easily fit in as a 2016 party staple". Wong, also compared the song to Anti's single "Needed Me", stating that like the latter Rihanna "emphasizes not only her independence from and lack of commitment to her current suitor but also her confidence in herself, making it another empowering girl tune."

Vice magazine placed the song at number two on their list of "100 Best Songs of 2016". According to the Jabbari Weekes, "Sex with Me" was an "explicit decree of Rihanna's fleshly beauty and sensual greatness, as she proclaims in its opening line from on high, 'Sex with me, so amazing!'" Weekes stated that the song differed from Rihanna's usual "aggressive tenor, instead relishing in pure elation and delight" and went on to praise the songs themes of "self love". In February 2017, "Sex with Me" was the top choice for Valentine's Day playlists on music streaming service Spotify.

== Chart performance ==
Following the album's release, "Sex with Me" appeared on the US Bubbling Under Hot 100 Singles, which lists the top singles that have not yet charted on the main Billboard Hot 100. After spending fourteen weeks on the Bubbling Under Hot 100 chart, the song debuted on the US Billboard Hot 100 at ninety-seven. In doing so the song became Rihanna's fifty-seventh track to chart on the Hot 100, tying her with Madonna as the female with the fourth most entries on the chart. In November 2016, the song re-appeared on the Billboard Hot 100 at a peak position of ninety-two. The song eventually peaked at eighty-three on the US Billboard Hot 100, and was certified two-times platinum by the Recording Industry Association of America (RIAA) for sales of two million.

Following the release of the remixes produced by MK, John Blake and Ray Rhodes, "Sex with Me" became Rihanna's twenty-ninth number-one on the US Dance Club Songs chart in the chart issue dated April 8, 2017, remaining second to Madonna with 46. It is also the fifth song from Anti to reach number-one, making it the first album to produce as many since Katy Perry's album Prism did so throughout 2013–14. Between "Work" and "Sex with Me", Rihanna had achieved six number-one songs while no other artist had garnered more than two in the same time span.

== Live performances ==
"Sex with Me" was featured on the set list of Rihanna's 2016 Anti World Tour. During the performance a transparent plank, was hoisted mid air from one stage to another, Kitty Empire of The Guardian, stated that during the performance Rihanna simulated sex and compared the performance to that of AC/DC.

== Formats and track listings ==
Digital download – Deluxe album version

16. "Sex with Me" – 3:26

Digital download – Remixes (Explicit)

1. "Sex with Me" (MK Remix) – 6:18
2. "Sex with Me" (Salva Remix) – 3:50
3. "Sex with Me" (John-Blake Remix) – 2:31
4. "Sex with Me" (Addal Remix) – 3:10
5. "Sex with Me" (DEVAULT Remix) – 4:07

Digital download – Remixes (Clean)

1. "Sex with Me" (MK Radio Edit Remix) – 4:03
2. "Sex with Me" (Salva Remix) – 3:51
3. "Sex with Me" (John-Blake Remix) – 2:29
4. "Sex with Me" (Addal Remix) – 3:10
5. "Sex with Me" (DEVAULT Remix) – 4:07

== Credits and personnel ==
The following credits were adapted from the liner notes of Anti, Westbury Road/Roc Nation.

Publishing

- Partyomo Ltd. (SOCAN)/ Warner Chappell Music // 1Damentional Publishing LLC/Sony ATV Tunes LLC (ASCAP)// Nyan King Music Inc. (SOCAN) / EMI Music Publishing Limited// Vinlyz Music Group (ASCAP); Admin by Sony/ATV Tunes LLC (ASCAP) //Publishing Designee of Chester Hansen// Monica Fenty Music Publishing /Warner-Tamerlane Publishing Corp. (BMI); All rights administered by Warner-Tamerlane Publishing Corp.

Recording

- Recorded at Westlake Beverly Recording Studios, Los Angeles, California
- Mixed at Larrabee Studios, Universal City, California
- Mastered at Sterling Sound, New York City, New York

Personnel

- Songwriting – Jahron Brathwaite, Matthew Samuels, Adam Feeney, Anderson Hernandez, Chester Hansen, Robyn Fenty
- Production – Boi-1da
- Co-production – Frank Dukes
- Additional production – Vinylz
- Vocal production – Kuk Harrell
- Vocal recording – Marcos Tovar, Kuk Harrell
- Assistant vocal recording – Chad Wilson, Thomas Warren
- Additional recording – Blake Mares
- Mastering – Chris Gehringer
- Keyboards – Shea Taylor
- Mixing – Manny Marroquin
- Assistant mixing – Chris Galland, Ike Schultz

== Charts ==
=== Weekly charts ===
Chart (2016–17)	Peak position
Canadian Digital Song Sales (Billboard)	49
France (SNEP)	52
UK Singles (Official Charts Company)	130
UK Hip Hop/R&B (Official Charts)	25
US Billboard Hot 100	83
US Dance Club Songs (Billboard)	1
US Hot R&B/Hip-Hop Songs (Billboard)	32
US R&B/Hip-Hop Airplay (Billboard)	8
US Rhythmic Airplay (Billboard)	36

=== Year-end charts ===
Chart (2016)	Position
US Hot R&B/Hip-Hop Songs (Billboard)	85
Chart (2017)	Position
US Hot Dance Club Songs (Billboard)	31

== Certifications ==
Region	Certification	Certified units/sales
Australia (ARIA)	Platinum	70,000^{‡}
Brazil (Pro-Música Brasil)	Gold	30,000^{‡}
Denmark (IFPI Danmark)	Platinum	90,000^{‡}
France (SNEP)	Gold	100,000^{‡}
New Zealand (RMNZ)	2× Platinum	60,000^{‡}
United Kingdom (BPI)	Platinum	600,000^{‡}
United States (RIAA)	4× Platinum	4,000,000^{‡}
Summaries
Worldwide	—	4,500,000^{‡}
^{‡} Sales+streaming figures based on certification alone.

== Release history ==
Country	Date	Format	Label
Worldwide (Remixes)	February 3, 2017	Digital download	Westbury Road; Roc Nation

== See also ==
- Artists with the most number-ones on the U.S. Dance Club Songs chart
- List of number-one dance singles of 2017 (U.S.)
