= Land of the Living (Kristine W song) =

1996 song by Kristine W

- One of artwork variants

Single by Kristine W

from the album Land of the Living
- Released: 1996
- Genre: Dance-pop; house
- Length: 4:02 (Rollo and Sister Bliss radio edit); 3:57 (album radio edit)
- Label: Tommy Boy Records
- Songwriters: Rob D.; Rollo; Kristine W
- Producers: Rob D.; Rollo

Kristine W singles chronology
"One More Try" (1996)	"Land of the Living" (1996)	"Stronger" (2000)

Music video
- "Land of the Living" on YouTube

"Land of the Living" is a song by American singer-songwriter Kristine W. It was released in 1996 by Tommy Boy Records as the third and final single from her debut album, Land of the Living (1996). It was written by Kristine W with its producers Rob D. and Rollo. The song became a huge club hit but only reached number 57 on the UK Singles Chart. In the US, it spent two weeks at number-one on the Billboard Hot Dance Club Play chart in November 1996. That was also the singer's third number-one single on this survey. "Land of the Living" was also a top-10 hit in Israel, peaking at number ten.

American singer and actress Patti LaBelle covered the song as a duet with Kristine W on Labelle's 2005 cover album Classic Moments.

== Critical reception ==
Larry Flick from Billboard magazine wrote that Kristine W returns with the title track to her deservedly acclaimed debut, "a melancholy pop/house anthem that beautifully showcases her formidable pipes and dramatic flair. With its affecting and intelligent lyrics, 'Land of the Living' deftly squashes the idea that all dance music is fluffy and mindless." William Stevensen from Entertainment Weekly described it as "ebullient". Alan Jones from Music Week named it a "dancefloor monster". Joey Bolsadura from Muzik viewed it as a "song of survival a la Gloria Gaynor with phunk". People Magazine wrote, "Even when Kristine W strikes her gloomiest pose, as in the beginning of the title song—I got a mirror, a bottle and a pen/ The mirror is cracked/ The bottle is empty/ And my pen don't know where to begin—she conveys that somehow things will get better. They do. Before long, a jacked-up beat kicks in, and she rides it all the way to a happy ending." J.D. Considine for Vibe complimented it as a "lean, house-style jam".

== Official versions ==
- Album Version 4:59
- Radio Edit 3:59
- Rollo & Sister Bliss/Kristine W Radio Edit 4:00
- Rollo And Sister Bliss Remix 7:18
- Lisa Marie Experience Radio Edit 4:08
- Lisa Marie Experience 8:05
- Lisa Marie Sequential Dub 7:41
- Junior Vasquez New Vocal Mix 7:36
- Junior's Factory Dub 8:01
- Dekkard's Planet Vocal Mix 12:03
- Dekkard's Planet Dub Mix 12:03
- Deep Dish Land Of The Lost Vocal Edit 8:30
- Deep Dish Land Of The Lost Remix (Vocal) 13:07
- Deep Dish Land Of The Lost Remix (Instrumental) 13:07
- Deep Dish Summer Madness Dub 11:30
- Deep Dish Slee-Stack Dub 1 5:20
- Deep Dish Slee-Stack Dub 2 3:40
- Kevin Saunderson Remix 6:35
- Kevin Saunderson Dub 6:33
- Timothy Allan Remix 7:26
- Timothy Allan Dub 7:26
- Maddladd's Dub 6:51
- Subgroover Radio Edit 3:44
- Subgroover Subwoofer Club Mix 5:28

== Charts ==
=== Weekly charts ===
Chart (1996–1997)	Peak position
Belgium Dance (Ultratop)	20
Canada Dance/Urban (RPM)	6
Israel (IBA)	10
Netherlands (Dutch Top 40)	35
Netherlands (Single Top 100)	44
Scotland (OCC)	75
UK Singles (OCC)	57
UK Dance (OCC)	3
UK Cool Cuts (Music Week)	1
US Hot Dance Club Play (Billboard)	1

=== Year-end charts ===
Chart (1996)	Positions
UK Club Chart (Music Week)	13

== See also ==
- List of Billboard number-one dance singles of 1996
