= List of Billboard number-one dance singles of 2009 =

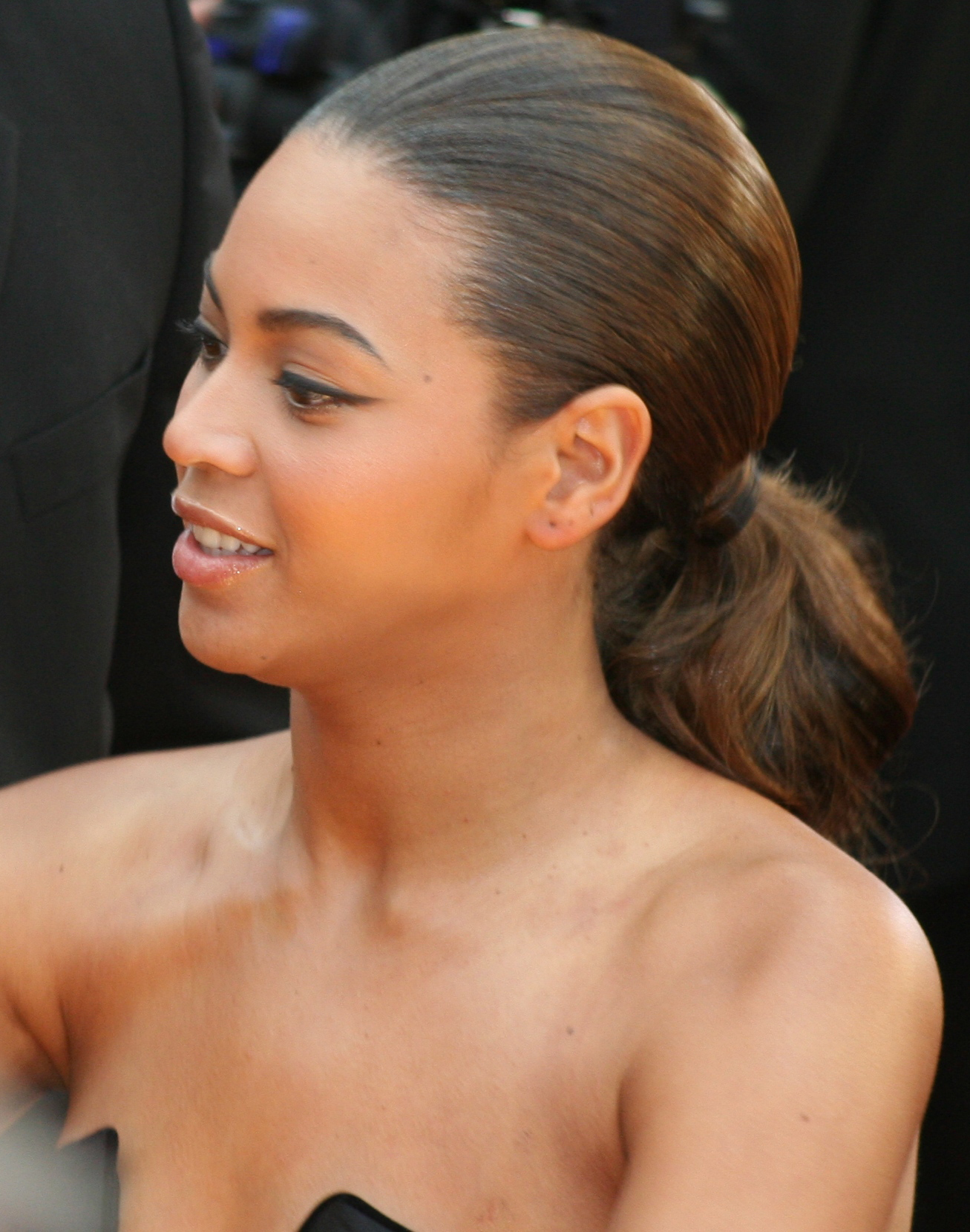
Beyoncé achieved four dance number ones in 2009, all from her album I Am... Sasha Fierce.

Billboard magazine compiled the top-performing dance singles in the United States during 2009 on the Hot Dance Club Play, the Hot Dance Singles Sales, and the Hot Dance Airplay. Premiered in 1976, the Hot Dance Club Play chart ranked the most-played singles on dance club based on reports from a national sample of club DJs. The Hot Dance Singles Sales chart was launched in 1985 to compile the best-selling dance singles based on retail sales across the United States. The Hot Dance Airplay was first published in 2003, ranking the singles based on airplay detections on dance radio.

The first number-one Dance Club Song of the year was "I Hate This Part" by American pop girl group The Pussycat Dolls, which spent two consecutive weeks atop the chart. Multiple artists made one chart appearance, including The Killers with "Human", Donna Summer with "Fame (The Game)", LeAnn Rimes with "What I Cannot Change", Shontelle with "T-Shirt", and Lily Allen with "The Fear". American singer Mariah Carey garnered her fourteenth and fifteenth number-ones on the chart with "I Stay in Love" from her eleventh studio album E=MC² (2008) and with "Obsessed" from her twelfth studio album Memoirs of an Imperfect Angel (2009), respectively.

French DJ David Guetta topped the Dance Club chart two times with "Sexy Bitch", a collaboration with Akon, and with "When Love Takes Over", a collaboration with Kelly Rowland; "When Love Takes Over spent two consecutive weeks atop the chart, and ranked at number one on the 2009 Hot Dance Club Songs year end chart. The Pussycat Dolls and Kristine W both achieved three number one singles on the chart. In addition to "I Hate This Part", which peaked at number one for two consecutive weeks, The Pussycat Dolls also topped the chart with "Bottle Pop", a collaboration with Snoop Dogg, and "Hush Hush", featuring Nicole Scherzinger. Kristine W topped the chart with "Never", "Love Is the Look", and "Be Alright". Beyoncé and Lady Gaga were the only artists to achieve at least four number one songs on the chart. The former topped the chart with "Single Ladies (Put a Ring on It)", "Diva", "Halo", and "Sweet Dreams". The latter topped the chart with the songs "Poker Face", "LoveGame", "Paparazzi", and "Bad Romance".

== Charts history ==
Chart history
Issue date	Hot Dance Club Play		Hot Dance Singles Sales		Hot Dance Airplay		Ref.
Issue date	Song	Artist(s)	Song	Artist(s)	Song	Artist(s)	Ref.
January 3	"I Hate This Part"	The Pussycat Dolls	"Miles Away"	Madonna	"Miles Away"	Madonna	
January 10	"I Hate This Part"	The Pussycat Dolls	"Womanizer"	Britney Spears	"Single Ladies (Put a Ring on It)"	Beyoncé	
January 17	"Single Ladies (Put a Ring on It)"	Beyoncé	"Poppin' Champagne"	All Time Low	"Single Ladies (Put a Ring on It)"	Beyoncé	
January 24	"Human"	The Killers	"Just Dance"	Lady Gaga Featuring Colby O'Donis	"Single Ladies (Put a Ring on It)"	Beyoncé	
January 31	"Fame (The Game)"	Donna Summer	"Just Dance"	Lady Gaga Featuring Colby O'Donis	"Imagination"	Jes	
February 7	"Never"	Kristine W	"Evening Wear/Mark David Chapman"	Mindless Self Indulgence	"Poker Face"	Lady Gaga	
February 14	"I Stay in Love"	Mariah Carey	"Just Dance"	Lady Gaga Featuring Colby O'Donis	"Poker Face"	Lady Gaga	
February 21	"Poker Face"	Lady Gaga	"Just Dance"	Lady Gaga Featuring Colby O'Donis	"Poker Face"	Lady Gaga	
February 28	"What I Cannot Change"	LeAnn Rimes	"Just Dance"	Lady Gaga Featuring Colby O'Donis	"Poker Face"	Lady Gaga	
March 7	"T-Shirt"	Shontelle	"Omen"	The Prodigy	"Poker Face"	Lady Gaga	
March 14	"Away"	Enrique Iglesias featuring Sean Garrett	"Day 'N' Nite"	Kid Cudi	"Poker Face"	Lady Gaga	
March 21	"Long Distance"	Brandy	"Just Dance"	Lady Gaga Featuring Colby O'Donis	"Poker Face"	Lady Gaga	
March 28	"Diva"	Beyoncé	"Day 'N' Nite"	Kid Cudi	"Poker Face"	Lady Gaga	
April 4	"The Fear"	Lily Allen	"Halo"	Beyoncé	"Poker Face"	Lady Gaga	
April 11	"God in Me"	Mary Mary featuring Kierra "KiKi" Sheard	"Halo"	Beyoncé	"Poker Face"	Lady Gaga	
April 18	"Love Story"	Nadia Ali	"Halo"	Beyoncé	"Poker Face"	Lady Gaga	
April 25	"Love Is the Look"	Kristine W	"Halo"	Beyoncé	"Poker Face"	Lady Gaga	
May 2	"T.O.N.Y."	Solange	"Halo"	Beyoncé	"Poker Face"	Lady Gaga	
May 9	"Boom"	Anjulie	"Halo"	Beyoncé	"Poker Face"	Lady Gaga	
May 16	"Bottle Pop"	Pussycat Dolls featuring Snoop Dogg	"Halo"	Beyoncé	"Poker Face"	Lady Gaga	
May 23	"Halo"	Beyoncé	"Boom Boom Pow"	The Black Eyed Peas	"Infinity 2008"	Guru Josh Project	
May 30	"Wrong"	Depeche Mode	"Boom Boom Pow"	The Black Eyed Peas	"Infinity 2008"	Guru Josh Project	
June 6	"Beautiful U R"	Deborah Cox	"Boom Boom Pow"	The Black Eyed Peas	"When Love Takes Over"	David Guetta featuring Kelly Rowland	
June 13	"I'm Not Getting Enough"	Ono	"Boom Boom Pow"	The Black Eyed Peas	"When Love Takes Over"	David Guetta featuring Kelly Rowland	
June 20	"When Love Takes Over" †	David Guetta featuring Kelly Rowland	"Boom Boom Pow"	The Black Eyed Peas	"When Love Takes Over"	David Guetta featuring Kelly Rowland	
June 27	"When Love Takes Over" †	David Guetta featuring Kelly Rowland	"Boom Boom Pow"	The Black Eyed Peas	"When Love Takes Over"	David Guetta featuring Kelly Rowland	
July 4	"Bad, Bad Boy"	The Perry Twins featuring Niki Haris	"Halo"	Beyoncé	"When Love Takes Over"	David Guetta featuring Kelly Rowland	
July 11	"Now I'm That Bitch	Livvi Franc	"It's Alright, It's OK"	Ashley Tisdale	"When Love Takes Over"	David Guetta featuring Kelly Rowland	
July 18	"Body Rock"	Oceana	"It's Alright, It's OK"	Ashley Tisdale	"When Love Takes Over"	David Guetta featuring Kelly Rowland	
July 25	"LoveGame"	Lady Gaga	"Summertime Clothes"	Animal Collective	"Let the Feelings Go"	Annagrace	
August 1	"Love etc."	Pet Shop Boys	"Heads Will Roll"	Yeah Yeah Yeahs	"Let the Feelings Go"	Annagrace	
August 8	"Give You Everything"	Erika Jayne	"Winter Hill"	Doves	"When Love Takes Over"	David Guetta featuring Kelly Rowland	
August 15	"Hush Hush"	Pussycat Dolls featuring Nicole Scherzinger	"Make Her Say"	Kid Cudi Featuring Kanye West & Common	"When Love Takes Over"	David Guetta featuring Kelly Rowland	
August 22	"Waking Up in Vegas"	Katy Perry	"Make Her Say"	Kid Cudi Featuring Kanye West & Common	"Let the Feelings Go"	Annagrace	
August 29	"Crazy Possessive"	Kaci Battaglia	"Excess Vibration"	Christelle Starring DJ Numbawun	"Let the Feelings Go"	Annagrace	
Sept. 5	"Be Alright"	Kristine W	"Excess Vibration"	Christelle Starring DJ Numbawun	"Let the Feelings Go"	Annagrace	
Sept. 12	"Sweet Dreams"	Beyoncé	"Excess Vibration"	Christelle Starring DJ Numbawun	"Let the Feelings Go"	Annagrace	
Sept. 19	"Bulletproof"	La Roux	"Celebration"	Madonna	"Let the Feelings Go"	Annagrace	
Sept. 26	"Celebration"	Madonna	"Paparazzi"	Lady Gaga	"Evacuate the Dancefloor"	Cascada	
October 3	"Obsessed"	Mariah Carey	"Paparazzi"	Lady Gaga	"Evacuate the Dancefloor"	Cascada	
October 10	"She Wolf"	Shakira	"Higher Than The Stars"	The Pains Of Being Pure At Heart	"Obsessed"	Mariah Carey	
October 17	"Everybody Shake It"	Ralphi Rosario featuring Shawn Christopher	"Higher Than The Stars"	The Pains Of Being Pure At Heart	"I Remember"	Deadmau5 vs. Kaskade	
October 24	"Sexy Bitch"	David Guetta featuring Akon	"Kelsey"	Metro Station	"I Remember"	Deadmau5 vs. Kaskade	
October 31	"Release Me"	Agnes	"Celebration"	Madonna	"Sexy Chick"	David Guetta featuring Akon	
November 7	"Million Dollar Bill"	Whitney Houston	"Nobody"	Wonder Girls	"Sexy Chick"	David Guetta featuring Akon	
November 14	"Paparazzi"	Lady Gaga	"Whatcha Say"	Jason Derulo	"Sexy Chick"	David Guetta featuring Akon	
November 21	"Did You See Me Coming?"	Pet Shop Boys	"Quicksilver"	The Crüxshadows	"I Will Be Here"	Tiësto featuring Sneaky Sound System	
November 28	"Fuck You"	Lily Allen	"Paparazzi"	Lady Gaga	"I Will Be Here"	Tiësto featuring Sneaky Sound System	
December 5	"S.O.S. (Let The Music Play)"	Jordin Sparks	"Paparazzi"	Lady Gaga	"Sexy Chick"	David Guetta featuring Akon	
December 12	"Perfect"	Depeche Mode	"Paparazzi"	Lady Gaga	"Sexy Chick"	David Guetta featuring Akon	
December 19	"Hang On"	Plumb	"Louder Than Boom"	Tiesto	"Kiss Me Back"	Kim Sozzi	
December 26	"Bad Romance"	Lady Gaga	"I'm A Tease"	Christelle Starring DJ Numbawun	"Sexy Chick"	David Guetta featuring Akon	

== See also ==
- 2009 in American music
- List of Billboard Hot 100 number ones of 2009
