= List of Billboard number-one dance singles of 1996 =

Billboard magazine compiled the top-performing dance singles in the United States during 1996 on two Hot Dance Music charts: the Club Play and the Maxi-Singles Sales. Premiered in 1976, the Club Play chart ranked the most-played singles on dance club based on reports from a national sample of club DJs. The Maxi-Singles Sales chart was launched in 1985 to compile the best-selling dance singles based on retail sales across the United States.

== Charts history ==
Chart history
Issue date	Hot Dance Music/Club Play		Hot Dance Music/Maxi-Singles Sales		Ref.
Issue date	Song	Artist(s)	Song	Artist(s)	Ref.
January 6	"Beautiful Life"	Ace of Base	"Missing"	Everything But The Girl	
January 13	"If I Were You"	k.d. lang	"Fu-Gee-La" (Refugee Camp Remix)	Fugees	
January 20	"Got Myself Together"	The Bucketheads	"Missing"	Everything But The Girl	
January 27	"Got Myself Together"	The Bucketheads	"Fu-Gee-La" (Refugee Camp Remix)	Fugees	
February 3	"I Found It"	Daphne	"Missing"	Everything But The Girl	
February 10	"When"	Sunscreem	"Missing"	Everything But The Girl	
February 17	"The Lover That You Are"	Pulse featuring Antoinette Roberson	"Soon As I Get Home"	Faith Evans	
February 24	"Day by Day"	Dajae	"Soon As I Get Home"	Faith Evans	
March 2	"Who Do U Love"	Deborah Cox	"Down Low (Nobody Has To Know)"	R. Kelly Featuring Ronald Isley	
March 9	"The New Anthem"	N-Joi	"Down Low (Nobody Has To Know)"	R. Kelly Featuring Ronald Isley	
March 16	"The New Anthem"	N-Joi	"Woo Hah!! Got You All in Check" / "Everything Remains Raw"	Busta Rhymes	
March 23	"Lucky Love"	Ace of Base	"Woo Hah!! Got You All in Check" / "Everything Remains Raw"	Busta Rhymes	
March 30	"Salva Mea"	Faithless	"Woo Hah!! Got You All in Check" / "Everything Remains Raw"	Busta Rhymes	
April 6	"Tres Deseos (Three Wishes)"	Gloria Estefan	"Woo Hah!! Got You All in Check" / "Everything Remains Raw"	Busta Rhymes	
April 13	"Hyperballad"	Björk	"Woo Hah!! Got You All in Check" / "Everything Remains Raw"	Busta Rhymes	
April 20	"The Sound"	X-Press 2	"Ain't No Nigga" / "Dead Presidents"	Jay-Z Featuring Foxxy Brown	
April 27	"The Sound"	X-Press 2	"Ain't No Nigga" / "Dead Presidents"	Jay-Z Featuring Foxxy Brown	
May 4	"Make the World Go Round"	Sandy B	"Ain't No Nigga" / "Dead Presidents"	Jay-Z Featuring Foxxy Brown	
May 11	"Make the World Go Round"	Sandy B	"Ain't No Nigga" / "Dead Presidents"	Jay-Z Featuring Foxxy Brown	
May 18	"Sunday Afternoons"	Vanessa Daou	"Ain't No Nigga" / "Dead Presidents"	Jay-Z Featuring Foxxy Brown	
May 25	"One More Try"	Kristine W	"Get Money"	Junior M.A.F.I.A. Featuring The Notorious B.I.G.	
June 1	"America (I Love America)"	Full Intention	"Get Money"	Junior M.A.F.I.A. Featuring The Notorious B.I.G.	
June 8	"America (I Love America)"	Full Intention	"Get Money"	Junior M.A.F.I.A. Featuring The Notorious B.I.G.	
June 15	"Children"	Robert Miles	"Get Money"	Junior M.A.F.I.A. Featuring The Notorious B.I.G.	
June 22	"Wrong"	Everything but the Girl	"How Do U Want It" / "California Love"	2Pac Featuring K-Ci & JoJo	
June 29	"Wrong"	Everything but the Girl	"How Do U Want It" / "California Love"	2Pac Featuring K-Ci & JoJo	
July 6	"Wrong"	Everything but the Girl	"How Do U Want It" / "California Love"	2Pac Featuring K-Ci & JoJo	
July 13	"Before"	Pet Shop Boys	"How Do U Want It" / "California Love"	2Pac Featuring K-Ci & JoJo	
July 20	"Before"	Pet Shop Boys	"How Do U Want It" / "California Love"	2Pac Featuring K-Ci & JoJo	
July 27	"Professional Widow"	Tori Amos	"How Do U Want It" / "California Love"	2Pac Featuring K-Ci & JoJo	
August 3	"Professional Widow"	Tori Amos	"How Do U Want It" / "California Love"	2Pac Featuring K-Ci & JoJo	
August 10	"Keep on Jumpin'"	Martha Wash and Jocelyn Brown	"How Do U Want It" / "California Love"	2Pac Featuring K-Ci & JoJo	
August 17	"You're Makin' Me High"	Toni Braxton	"How Do U Want It" / "California Love"	2Pac Featuring K-Ci & JoJo	
August 24	"You're Makin' Me High"	Toni Braxton	"Only You"	112 Featuring The Notorious B.I.G.	
August 31	"Stand Up"	Love Tribe	"Hit Me Off"	New Edition	
September 7	"You Got to Pray"	Joi Cardwell	"Hit Me Off"	New Edition	
September 14	"You Got to Pray"	Joi Cardwell	"Hit Me Off"	New Edition	
September 21	"Killing Me Softly with His Song"	Roberta Flack	"Fired Up!"	Funky Green Dogs	
September 28	"Killing Me Softly with His Song"	Roberta Flack	"How Do U Want It" / "California Love"	2Pac Featuring K-Ci & JoJo	
October 5	"Two to Tango"	Vanessa Daou	"How Do U Want It" / "California Love"	2Pac Featuring K-Ci & JoJo	
October 12	"Two to Tango"	Vanessa Daou	"How Do U Want It" / "California Love"	2Pac Featuring K-Ci & JoJo	
October 19	"Two to Tango"	Vanessa Daou	"No Diggity"	BLACKstreet (Featuring Dr. Dre)	
October 26	"Stomp"	Quincy Jones featuring the Cast of Stomp	"No Diggity"	BLACKstreet (Featuring Dr. Dre)	
November 2	"Who Is He (And What Is He to You)?"	Meshell Ndegeocello	"No Diggity"	BLACKstreet (Featuring Dr. Dre)	
November 9	"No Frills Love"	Jennifer Holliday	"Street Dreams"	Nas	
November 16	"Land of the Living"	Kristine W	"Street Dreams"	Nas	
November 23	"Land of the Living"	Kristine W	"Where Do You Go"	No Mercy	
November 30	"The Child (Inside)"	Qkumba Zoo	"Where Do You Go"	No Mercy	
December 7	"One and One"	Robert Miles	"Un-Break My Heart"	Toni Braxton	
December 14	"Sugar Is Sweeter"	C. J. Bolland	"Un-Break My Heart"	Toni Braxton	
December 21	"Un-Break My Heart"	Toni Braxton	"Un-Break My Heart"	Toni Braxton	
December 28	"Un-Break My Heart"	Toni Braxton	"Un-Break My Heart"	Toni Braxton	

== See also ==
- 1996 in music
- List of Billboard Hot 100 number ones of 1996
