= The Power of Music =

The Power of Music may refer to:

- The Power of Music (Kristine W album)
  - "The Power of Music" (song)
- The Power of Music (The Miracles album)

== See also ==
- Power of Music 2011 A, a tour by Ayumi Hamasaki
- The War: The Power of Music, a repackage album by Exo
