= Land of the Living (album) =

Studio album by Kristine W
- Released: July 23, 1996
- Genre: Dance-pop; Hi-NRG; house; club/dance
- Label: RCA (US); Champion (Europe); ZYX (Europe re-issue)
- Producer: Rollo Armstrong; Rob Dougan

Kristine W chronology
Land of the Living (1996)	Stronger (2000)

Professional ratings
Review scores
Source	Rating
AllMusic	4/5 stars
Billboard	(favorable)
Entertainment Weekly	B+
People Magazine	(favorable)
Vibe	(favorable)

Land of the Living is the first official album by American dance, electronica and jazz singer-songwriter Kristine W. It was released in 1996.

== Singles ==
Three singles were released from the album: "Feel What You Want" (UK No. 33 in 1994; No. 40 re-issue in 1997), "One More Try" (US No. 78, UK No. 41) and "Land of the Living" (UK No. 57).

== Track listing ==
=== North American version ===
All tracks written by Kristine W, Rollo Armstrong and Rob Dougan, except where noted.

No.	Title	Writer(s)	Length
1.	"Breathe"		3:39
2.	"Land of the Living"		4:59
3.	"Love Song"		4:54
4.	"Let Me In"		4:36
5.	"Feel What You Want"		5:29
6.	"Prairie Day"		1:33
7.	"One More Try"		4:27
8.	"Sweet Mercy Me"		4:39
9.	"Don't Wanna Think"		5:49
10.	"Jazzin'"	Kristine W; Armstrong; Will Mount	3:55
11.	"One More Try" (Rollo's Big Mix)		9:35

=== European version ===
No.	Title	Writer(s)	Length
1.	"Breathe"		3:39
2.	"Land of the Living"		4:59
3.	"Love Song"		4:54
4.	"Let Me In"		4:36
5.	"Feel What You Want"		4:11
6.	"Prairie Day"		1:32
7.	"One More Try"		4:28
8.	"Sweet Mercy Me"		4:39
9.	"Don't Wanna Think"		3:15
10.	"Jazzin'"	Kristine W; Armstrong; Will Mount	3:55

== Personnel ==
Adapted from the album's liner notes.

- Produced by Rollo Armstrong and Rob Dougan
- Mixed by Rollo Armstrong, Rob Dougan and Goetz
- Engineered by Goetz, except "Feel What You Want" engineered by Russell Leahy
- Assistant engineers: Ibi Tijani, Nick Kirkland
- Percussion on "Feel What You Want" and "Jazzin'": Luís Jardim
- Recorded and mixed at Swanyard Studios, London
- Design and artwork: Stylus
- Photography: Ellis Parrinder
