= Lovin' You (Kristine W song) =

2001 single by Kristine W

Single by Kristine W

from the album Stronger
- Released: 2001
- Recorded: 2000
- Genre: Dance-pop
- Length: 3:29
- Label: RCA Records
- Songwriter(s): Johnny Pedersen / Karsten Dahlgaard / Maria Christensen / Vincent Degiorgio / Kristine Weitz

Kristine W singles chronology
"Stronger" (2000)	"Lovin' You" (2001)	"Some Lovin'" (2003)

"Lovin' You" is a song by Kristine W, released as the second and final official single from her second album Stronger.

The song reached #1 on the U.S. Billboard Hot Dance Club Play chart in 2001. "Lovin' You" was Kristine W's fifth song to reach the top on this survey.

== Cover versions ==
- The song was covered in 2003 by British girl group Atomic Kitten for their third studio album, Ladies Night.

== Use in media ==
- The song was featured on the Showtime hit show Queer as Folk. It appeared on season 1, episode 4, and was also included on the Season 1 soundtrack.

== See also ==
- List of Billboard number-one dance singles of 2001
