= Joe Gauthreaux =

American house music DJ and producer

DJ Joe Gauthreaux
- Origin: New Orleans, United States
- Genres: House
- Years active: 1996–present
- Label: Centaur Music
- Website: http://djjoeg.com

Joe Gauthreaux is a niche American house music DJ and producer largely known in the gay circuit party scene. In addition to his production and DJ work, Gauthreaux is also a reporter for Billboard magazine.

== Career ==
=== Professional DJ ===
Gauthreaux's first professional DJ job was in Baton Rouge during Mardi Gras. He spent the first half of his career in his hometown in New Orleans, where he became a resident player at a club called "Oz"(a club which had been affected by the Hurricane Katrina). He later joined Centaur Entertainment, an independent record label for other acclaimed DJs such as Tony Moran, Ultra Nate, Boy George and Junior Vasquez, for his production work. In 2003, he decided to expand his career and moved to New York City, a risk that paid off as he quickly found fame in the Big Apple in less than a year. He was then accepted as one of 140 distinguished DJs responsible for compiling Billboard magazine's weekly Hot Dance Music/Club Play chart.

Due to his increasing popularity in the club scene and especially in the gay community, he was hailed as the "Hottest DJ of 2005" by Out Magazine in their June issue. On November 28, 2005, Gauthreaux appeared on the now-defunct gay talk show called On Q Live! to discuss that recognition. For his live television debut, he also talked about his music and viewers got a glimpse of his personality outside the DJ's booth.

As of 2006, he has played in numerous high-profile venues in the United States, Canada, and the Philippines.

=== Music ===
He describes his musical selections as the "music you're more likely to hear during peak hours of the night." His style is primarily vocal house music infused with tribal rhythms and melodic trance beats. Aside from labelmate Junior Vasquez, he cites Susan Morabito, Frankie Knuckles, Lydia Prim and David Morales as his major musical influences. He has admitted in several interviews that he always spends long hours to look for fresh beats or long-forgotten classics in record bars and music websites for his setlist.

== Discography ==
For his two compilation albums released in 2002 and 2005 under Centaur Music, the tracks begin with a "bright joyful feeling, with lots of vocals, pianos and instrumentation," and in the latter half, the sounds pick up the pace "with a more tribal and progressive house sound."

=== PartyGroove: Blueball (2002) ===
1. Love Is Gonna Save The Day - Georgie Porgie
2. We're Going Up - Donna Washington
3. Cream E.P. - Ellepi
4. I Got This Feeling - Prospect Park
5. Ride The Rhythm - Z Factor
6. Imagination - Ceevox
7. Dutch Drum Attack - E. Craig
8. Saturday - Joey Negro
9. Drums 4 Better Daze - Lovesky
10. Such Is Life - Rank 1 featuring Shanokee

=== PartyGroove: Cherry Volume 2 (2005) ===
1. Can I Hear The Drum - Scott Wozniak
2. It's Gotta Be - Sucker DJ's
3. Set Your Body Free - Gordon
4. Drama - DJ Rhythm presents Soul Theory
5. Stand Up - Loleatta Holloway
6. Music's Gotta Jumpin' - Groove Junkies feat. Indeya vs. Hornetz - King Master
7. On The Drum - Peter Presta & Little Carlos
8. Psycho - DJ Fist
9. I Feel Love - Antoine Clamaran pres. Different Drums
10. Let There Be Light - Eric Entrena vs. David Amo and Julio Navas
11. Emperor - Anthony Class
12. Thru - Kings of Tomorrow

=== Selected remixes ===
- "The Power of Music" - Kristine W
- "Cover Girl" - RuPaul
- "Sexy Sexy" - Charo
- "Loca" - Ranny
- "Freeze" - Bimbo Jones
- "You Are" - Tony Moran
- "Key to Your Soul" - John LePage feat. Debby Holiday
- "Boyfriend" - Justin Bieber
- "Industry" - Terry Sartor

== Additional information ==
- He was raised as a Jehovah's Witness.
- He can play the guitar.
