= The 22nd Sunday in Ordinary Time Sessions =

EP by Rob Dougan
- Released: May 9, 2015
- Genre: Trip hop, neo-classical, classical
- Label: Independent
- Producer: Rob Dougan, James Shearman

Rob Dougan chronology
Furious Angels (2002)	The 22nd Sunday in Ordinary Time Sessions (2015)	Misc. Sessions (2016)

The 22nd Sunday in Ordinary Time Sessions is an EP in preparation for a second album by Rob Dougan, released on May 9, 2015, alongside a film of the orchestra on Gumroad.

The recording and 20-minute film of the sessions features a 75-piece orchestral and 40-piece choir, five instrumental songs, and was recorded at London's Air Lyndhurst Studios.

== Track listing ==
No.	Title	Length
1.	"Frescobaldi's Toccata (Orchestral Session)"	4:38
2.	"Vale (Ave Atque Vale) (Orchestral Session)"	4:46
3.	"The Return (Orchestral Session)"	5:02
4.	"A Drawing-Down of Blinds / Valedico (Orchestral Session)"	6:24
5.	"The Return (Orchestral Session) (Alternative Mix) (bonus track)"	5:00
