= Misc. Sessions =

Studio album by Rob Dougan
- Released: October 23, 2016
- Genre: Trip hop, neo-classical
- Label: Independent
- Producer: Rob Dougan

Rob Dougan chronology
The 22nd Sunday in Ordinary Time Sessions (2015)	Misc. Sessions (2016)	The Life of the World to Come (2018)

Misc. Sessions is an EP by Rob Dougan, an Australian composer, in preparation for a new album, recorded at Abbey Road Studios and featuring a 10-piece chamber string section alongside a larger 50-piece orchestra, and five new songs. It was released on October 23, 2016 on Gumroad.

== Track listing ==
No.	Title	Length
1.	"She's Leaving"	4:19
2.	"Undone by London"	4:27
3.	"Open Sore"	4:58
4.	"Miscellaneous"	3:53
5.	"Undone by London (Reprise)"	4:01
6.	"She's Leaving (Instrumental)"	4:03
7.	"Undone by London (Instrumental)"	4:25
8.	"Open Sore (Instrumental)"	4:59
9.	"Miscellaneous (Instrumental)"	3:56
10.	"Undone by London (Orchestral)"	4:02
11.	"Open Sore (Orchestral)"	4:40
12.	"Miscellaneous (Orchestral)"	3:51
