= Straight Up with a Twist =

Studio album by Kristine W
- Released: September 14, 2010
- Genre: Jazz (Disc 1), dance (Disc 2)
- Label: Fly Again Music

Kristine W chronology
| The Power of Music (2009) | Straight Up with a Twist (2010) |

Straight Up with a Twist is the fifth full-length album and the first jazz album from Kristine W, released on September 14, 2010. The first single sent to radio, "Feel What You Want", was released to jazz stations on August 6, 2010 and was ranked number 1 on Billboard's Dance/Club Play Songs since 1994.

== Track listing ==
=== Disc One: Live Studio Sessions ===
1. Feel What You Want
2. Stairway To Heaven
3. On The Radio
4. Save My Soul
5. What I Like About You
6. Some Lovin
7. Window To Your World
8. Stronger
9. Wonder Of It All
10. Dream On
11. Take It To The Limit
12. River Divides
13. Who Knows
14. We Well Meet Again
15. Feel What You Want (Instrumental)

=== Disc Two: Electro-Lounge Remixes ===
1. River Divides
2. Feel What You Want
3. Stairway To Heaven
4. Some Lovin
5. The Boss
6. Save My Soul
7. Stronger
8. On The Radio
9. Window To Your World
10. Dream On
11. What I Like About You
12. Wonder Of It All
13. Who Knows
14. Meet Again
15. First Time I Ever Saw Your Face
16. Feel What You Want Electro Jazz Radio
17. Feel What You Want Live Sessions Radio
