= One More Try (Kristine W song) =

Single by Kristine W

from the album Land of the Living
- Released: 1995
- Genre: Disco; house
- Length: 4:21
- Label: Champion
- Songwriters: Rob D.; Rollo; Kristine W
- Producers: Rob D.; Rollo

Kristine W singles chronology
"Feel What You Want" (1994)	"One More Try" (1995)	"Land of the Living" (1997)

Music video
- "One More Try" on YouTube

"One More Try" is a song by American club music singer-songwriter Kristine W, released in 1995, by Champion Records, as the second single from her debut album, Land of the Living (1996). The song received positive reviews from music critics, but narrowly missed the Top 40 on the UK Singles Chart, peaking at number 41. In the US, it reached number-one on the Billboard Hot Dance Club Play chart, and numbers 78 and 64 on the Billboard Hot 100 and Cash Box Top 100. In the Netherlands, "One More Try" was a top-20 hit, peaking at number 16. Its music video was directed by British director Lindy Heymann, who had previously directed the video for the singer's debut single, "Feel What You Want". Kristine W wrote the song after taking some friends to see her hometown and discovering her old junior high school had been condemned.

== Critical reception ==
Larry Flick from Billboard magazine wrote that the song, a long-anticipated follow-up to the massive "Feel What You Want" "is a true rarity in dance music. It makes a pensive and poignant lyrical point without clouding the track's overall potential to inspire active twitchin' and twirlin'. Producers Rollo and Rob D. have created a grand disco/house arrangement that allows Kristine to shine like the star she deserves to be." He also named it a "fun and blippy house anthem". In March 1996, he described it as "heartwarming", adding, "Even a year after its first aborted shipment on EastWest, this track sounds as fresh and rhythmically relevant as ever." Daina Danin from Cash Box stated that "club fave Kristine W has a gorgeous, throaty voice and this lush, soulful dance track is already popular in New York City clubs through a Junior Vasquez remix, along with airplay on NY's WKTU and Philly's WIOQ."

William Stevensen from Entertainment Weekly complimented it as an "infectious anthem". Richard Smith from Melody Maker named it one of the Singles of the Week, writing, "With a voice like Heaven and the frocks to match. [...] At once absolutely desolate and completely delirious, 'One More Try' should see loads of people slashing their wrists on the dancefloor and muttering, Why did you leave me, you bitch, out loud. It's menthol-cool floor-filler with Kristine's elegant vocals teetering on the edge of despair, married to Rollo and Rob D's stark but warm beats, big fat bouncing bass lines and piping organs. Ruddy magnificent." Daisy & Havoc from the Record Mirror Dance Update gave it a score of four out of five, adding, "Kristine W's new song is appealing in a subtle, miserable kind of way and it's made minimal and atmospheric by one Rollo & Sister Bliss mix and large and pounding by the other." Joey Bolsadura from Muzik and Ben Wener from Orange County Register praised it as "splendid" and "irresistible".

== Track listing ==
- CD single, UK (1996)
1. "One More Try" (Rollo And Sister Bliss Radio Edit) — 4:20
2. "One More Try" (Rollo And Sister Bliss Club Radio Edit) — 4:08
3. "One More Try" (Rollo And Sister Bliss Club Mix) — 6:57
4. "One More Try" (Def Club Mix) — 7:17
5. "One More Try" (Junior's Factory Mix) — 4:25
6. "One More Try" (Big Mix) — 4:10
7. "One More Try" (Monster Mix) — 4:16
- CD single, US (1996)
1. "One More Try" (Original Version) — 4:20
2. "One More Try" (Rollo's Big Mix Edit) — 4:07
3. "One More Try" (Radio Edit) — 3:55

== Charts ==
=== Weekly charts ===
Chart (1996)	Peak position
Canada Top Singles (RPM)	81
Canada Dance/Urban (RPM)	1
Israel (Israeli Singles Chart)	9
Netherlands (Dutch Top 40)	17
Netherlands (Single Top 100)	16
Scotland (OCC)	46
UK Singles (OCC)	41
UK Dance (OCC)	9
US Billboard Hot 100	78
US Hot Dance Club Play (Billboard)	1
US Cash Box Top 100	64

=== Year-end charts ===
Chart (1996)	Position
UK Club Chart (Music Week)	17

== See also ==
- List of Billboard number-one dance singles of 1996
