= Never (Kristine W song) =

Single by Kristine W

from the album The Power of Music
- Released: 2008
- Genre: Dance music
- Label: Fly Again Music
- Songwriter(s): Kristine W
- Producer(s): Kristine W

Kristine W singles chronology
"The Boss" (2008)	"Never" (2008)	"Love Is the Look" (2009)

"Never" is the third single from Kristine W's album The Power of Music. The single became Kristine W's twelfth number one on the Billboard Hot Dance Club Play chart.

== Track listing ==
U.S. Maxi CD

1. "Never" (Love To Infinity Radio Mix) (4:20)
2. "Never" (DJ Escape & Johnny Vicious Radio Mix) (4:15)
3. "Never" (7th Heaven Radio Mix) (4:18)
4. "Never" (DJ Peter Canellis & Kamil Bartoszcze Radio Mix) (3:57)
5. "Never" (Nick Harvey Radio Mix) (4:29)
6. "Never" (Brothers Behind the Light/M2 Radio Mix) (4:50)
7. "Never" (Perry Twins Radio Mix) (4:36)
8. "Never" (Ruff & Torte Club Mix) (7:48)
9. "Never" (Love To Infinity Club Mix) (6:58)
10. "Never" (DJ Escape & Johnny Vicious Club Mix) (8:04)
11. "Never" (7th Heaven Club Mix) (7:49)
12. "Never" (DJ Peter Canellis & Kamil Bartoszcze Backroom Mix) (8:12)
13. "Never" (Perry Twins Electro-Club Mix) (7:46)

== Chart positions ==
Chart (2009)	Peak position
U.S. Billboard Hot Dance Club Play	1

== See also ==
- List of Billboard number-one dance singles of 2009
