= Furious Angels =

2002 studio album by Rob Dougan

Studio album by Rob Dougan
- Released: 1 July 2002
- Recorded: 1994–2002
- Genres: Electronica; trip hop
- Length: 71:10
- Labels: BMG; Cheeky; Warner Bros.; Reprise
- Producer: Rob Dougan

Rob Dougan chronology
Furious Angels (2002)	The 22nd Sunday in Ordinary Time Sessions (2015)

Professional ratings
Aggregate scores
Source	Rating
Metacritic	63/100
Review scores
Source	Rating
About.com	5/5 stars
Kludge	7/10
Q	4/5 stars
Uncut	4/5 stars

Furious Angels is the debut studio album by the Australian music producer Rob Dougan. It was released on 1 July 2002 in the United Kingdom and in July 2003 in the United States. It was nominated for the 2004 Grammy Award for Best Boxed or Special Limited Edition Package.

== Release ==
Furious Angels was originally released as a single-disc album (14 tracks for its world edition, 15 for its home UK edition) dominated by vocal tracks. It was then rereleased as a two-disc album, disc one featuring all 15 songs and disc two featuring 10 instrumental versions of the vocal songs from the first disc, as well as two music videos; there has also been a special-edition set adding a booklet of lyrics and photographs. The album was written, produced and mainly financed by Dougan himself, rather than a studio, with funds generally raised through the licensing of tracks from the album for film and television.

A 2003 article in The Guardian noted:

Rob Dougan is a rather odd musician. He says he's not particularly interested in music, for a start. His most famous track, "Clubbed to Death", is dance music that you could never dance to. He has written for both Matrix films, but doesn't seem to think much of what he did for those either. He spent six years working on his orchestral solo album, Furious Angels, which could either be an epic work of panoramic genius or a gargantuan monument to his ego, with strings—it's hard to tell. And he has just been asked to remix some Frank Sinatra tracks, even though he thinks remixes are a waste of time.

== Track listing ==
=== Disc one ===
No.	Title	Length
1.	"Prelude"	0:42
2.	"Furious Angels"	5:56
3.	"Will You Follow Me?"	3:50
4.	"Left Me for Dead"	4:39
5.	"I'm Not Driving Anymore"	4:34
6.	"Clubbed to Death" (Kurayamino Variation)	7:28
7.	"There's Only Me"	5:37
8.	"Instrumental"	4:28
9.	"Nothing at All"	6:32
10.	"Born Yesterday"	5:20
11.	"Speed Me Towards Death"	4:32
12.	"Drinking Song"	3:58
13.	"Pause"	0:33
14.	"One and the Same" (Coda)	5:45
15.	"Clubbed to Death 2" (UK Bonus Track. Opens with 1:00 of silence. Song is 6:10.)	7:10

=== Disc two (instrumental) ===
No.	Title	Length
1.	"Will You Follow Me?"	4:34
2.	"Furious Angels"	6:04
3.	"Left Me for Dead"	4:40
4.	"I'm Not Driving Anymore"	4:34
5.	"There's Only Me"	5:36
6.	"Instrumental" (Incorrectly labelled as Clubbed to Death [Instrumental Version] in some UK printings.)	4:30
7.	"Nothing at All"	5:54
8.	"Born Yesterday"	7:33
9.	"Speed Me Towards Death"	4:30
10.	"One and the Same (Coda)"	5:45
11.	"Clubbed to Death (Video)"	3:28
12.	"Furious Angels (Video)"	3:58

== Influences ==
The introduction to "Clubbed to Death" is taken directly from the main theme of Edward Elgar's "Enigma Variations". The piano introduction to "I'm Not Driving Anymore" and the orchestral part of "Clubbed to Death 2" (only on the UK version of the album) is built around Frédéric Chopin's "Prelude No. 4 in E-minor" (from Preludes, opus 28). The "Instrumental" and the orchestral part of "One And The Same" are variations of Johann Sebastian Bach's "Concerto for 2 Violins in D Minor, BWV1043".

== Song usage ==
Some tracks from the album have been licensed for use in feature films, advertising, and television, including the Matrix film series and the Top Gear television show. The song "Furious Angels" is used by the Los Angeles Lakers to introduce visiting teams. The instrumental version of this song also appears in the opening sequence of the video game Grand Prix 3. Several shows in the Law & Order franchise have used tracks from Furious Angels as an opening credits theme for UK airings: "I'm Not Driving Anymore" was used by Law & Order and Law & Order: Special Victims Unit, and "There's Only Me" was used by Law & Order: Criminal Intent.

== Charts ==
Chart (2003)	Peak Position
Australian Albums (ARIA)	174
U.S. Billboard Top Electronic Albums	8
