= Clubbed to Death (instrumental) =

1995 single by Rob Dougan

Single by Rob Dougan

from the album Furious Angels
- B-side: "Clubbed to Death" (Remixes)
- Released: February 1995
- Recorded: 1994
- Genre: Trip hop; neo-classical
- Length: 7:29 (Kurayamino Variation); 7:12 (First Mix); 3:17 (radio edit)
- Label: Mo' Wax
- Songwriter: Rob Dougan
- Producer: Rob Dougan

Rob Dougan singles chronology
"Hard Times" (1994)	"Clubbed to Death" (1995)	"Furious Angels" (1998)

"Clubbed to Death" is an instrumental composition by Australian music producer Rob Dougan, originally released on Mo' Wax records in 1995. It featured in the 1997 film Clubbed to Death and was given renewed attention in 1999 due to its inclusion in the film The Matrix (during the "woman in the red dress" scene), and to its inclusion in the Argentine TV program La Cornisa. It was re-released with new remixes in 2002.

== Release ==
The subtitle Kurayamino variation is based on the Japanese for "of the darkness" (暗闇 の kurayami no). The song samples "It's a New Day" by Skull Snaps. The short strings introduction is an excerpt from the first part of Edward Elgar's Enigma Variations, and the piano solo is improvised around Elgar's theme.

== Track listing ==
=== Clubbed to Death (Compact Disc Experience) ===
Mo Wax, MW037CD, 1995

1. "The First Mix" — 7:12
2. "Kurayamino Variation" — 7:29
3. "La Funk Mob Variation" — 8:08
4. "Peshay Remix" — 6:06
5. "Spoon Mix" remixed by Carl Craig — 5:55
6. "Clubbed to Death Darkside" remixed by La Funk Mob — 5:05

=== Clubbed to Death #1 ===
Mo Wax, MW037, 1995

1. "La Funk Mob Variation"
2. "Clubbed to Death Darkside"
3. "The First Mix"

=== Clubbed to Death #2 ===
Mo Wax, MW037R, 1995

1. "Kurayamino Variation"
2. "Peshay Remix"
3. "Spoon Mix"
4. "Totally Waxed Remix" remixed by Wax Doctor

== Charts ==
Chart (1996)	Peak position
Australia (ARIA Charts)	72

Chart (2002/03)	Peak position
Australia (ARIA Charts)	92
Ireland (IRMA)	27
UK Dance (Official Charts)	2
UK Singles (Official Charts)	24
