= On Fire (T-Connection album) =

Studio album by T-Connection
- Released: 1977
- Studio: Criteria Recording Studios, Miami, Florida
- Genre: Funk / Soul
- Length: 39:12
- Label: Dash
- Producer: Alex Sadkin, Cory Wade, T-Connection

T-Connection chronology
Magic (1976)	On Fire (1977)	T-Connection (1978)

On Fire is the second album by the funk band T-Connection. The album was released in 1978.

== Track listing ==
All tracks composed by Theophilus Coakley; except where noted.
Side A

1. "On Fire" (7:23)
2. "Prisoner of My Mind" (4:49)
3. "Lady of the Night" (3:41)
4. "Watching You" (Monty Brown) - (3:38)

Side B

1. "Let Yourself Go" (5:00)
2. "Groove to Get Down" (4:18)
3. "Cush" (6:28)
4. "Playin' Games" (3:55)

== Reception ==
Professional ratings
Review scores
Source	Rating
AllMusic	3/5 stars

Billboard magazine called On Fire an emotional album with a "lively, joyous quality", while AllMusic felt T-Connection's music was more pop than disco.

== Chart performance ==
In 1978, On Fire peaked at No. 139 on the Billboard Top LPs & Tape chart and No. 40 on the Billboard Soul LPs chart.
