= Love Is the Look =

Single by Kristine W

from the album The Power of Music
- Released: March 10, 2009
- Genre: Dance-pop; house; dance
- Length: 4:17
- Label: Fly Again Music
- Songwriter: Kristine W
- Producer: Kristine W

Kristine W singles chronology
"Never" (2008)	"Love Is the Look" (2009)	"Be Alright" (2009)

"Love Is the Look" is a song written and produced by American singer-songwriter Kristine W, taken from her fourth studio album, The Power of Music (2009). The song was released as the album's fourth single on March 10, 2009 by Fly Away Music. The single went to number one on the Billboard Hot Dance Club Play chart on April 25, 2009. It was Kristine W's thirteenth number one on the U.S. dance chart.

== Track listing ==
U.S. Maxi CD

1. "Love Is the Look" (Love To Infinity If Hooks Could Kill Radio) (3:56)
2. "Love Is the Look" (Rosario K-Y® INTRIGUE™ Radio) (3:52)
3. "Love Is the Look" (Deepswing's Runway Glide Radio) (3:58)
4. "Love Is the Look" (Mr. Mig's Looking Like Love Radio) (3:53)
5. "Love Is the Look" (Massi & De Leon Full-On Vocal Radio) (4:10)
6. "Love Is the Look" (Tod Miner's Elektro Radio) (3:53)
7. "Love Is the Look" (Love To Infinity If Hooks Could Kill Club) (7:01)
8. "Love Is the Look" (Rosario K-Y® INTRIGUE™ Club) (7:32)
9. "Love Is the Look" (Deepswing's Runway Runway Glide Mix) (7:57)
10. "Love Is the Look" (Mr. Mig's Looking Like Love Club) (5:49)
11. "Love Is the Look" (Massi & De Leon Full-On Vocal Mix) (8:59)
12. "Love Is the Look" (Tod Miner's Elektro Hot Wheels Club) (7:34)

== See also ==
- List of Billboard number-one dance singles of 2009
