= Fade (Kristine W song) =

Single by Kristine W

from the album The Power of Music
- Released: March 22, 2011
- Genre: Dance music
- Label: Fly Again Music
- Songwriter(s): Dave Valler, Penny Foster
- Producer(s): Kristine W

Kristine W singles chronology
"The Power of Music" (2009)	"Fade" (2011)	"Everything That I Got" (2012)

"Fade" is the seventh and final single released from Kristine W's 2009 album The Power of Music. The single was released in two parts, called "Fade: The Epic Remixes Parts 1 & 2" featuring 24 different remixes from 9 different producers. With the June 18, 2011 issue of Billboard, "Fade" became Kristine W's 16th number one single on the Hot Dance/ Club Play Charts, and her seventh from The Power of Music. This number one single also moved her above Mariah Carey as the 7th artist with the most number ones on the Hot Dance/ Club Play Charts behind Madonna (who has 43 #1s) and Janet Jackson who has 22. With "Fade", Kristine W also broke the record for most #1 singles from one album on the Billboard Dance Charts.

== Track listing ==
=== Part 1 ===
U.S. Maxi CD

1. Fade (Buzz Junkies Radio)
2. Fade (Johnny Vicious Radio)
3. Fade (Alex Acosta Dirty Tech Radio)
4. Fade (Royaal Radio)
5. Fade (Subgroover Radio)
6. Fade (Chico POM Album Edit)
7. Fade (Johnny Vicious Warehouse Radio)
8. Fade (Royaal w/ULI's Live Strings)
9. Fade (Buzz Junkies Get Buzzed Remix)
10. Fade (Johnny Vicious Club Mix)
11. Fade (Alex Acosta Dirty Tech Club)
12. Fade (Royaal Down Under Club Mix)
13. Fade (Subgroover Extended Club Mix)

=== Part 2 ===
U.S. Maxi CD

1. Fade (Chris Thomas Black & Blue Club Mix)
2. Fade (Johnny Vicious Warehouse Mix)
3. Fade (Buzz Junkies Club)
4. Fade (Alex Acosta Dirty Instrumental Tech Mix)
5. Fade (Royaal Dub Mix)
6. Fade (Johnny Vicious Remix)
7. Fade (Johnny Vicious Warehouse Instrumental)
8. Fade (Johnny Vicious Remix Radio)
9. Fade (Johnny Vicious Radio Acca Remix)
10. Fade (Oliver Watts JBH Anthem Mix)
11. Fade (Guy Scheiman TLV Remix)

== Chart performance ==
Chart (2011)	Peak position
U.S. Hot Dance Club Songs	1

=== Year-end charts ===
Chart (2011)	Position
US Hot Dance Club Songs (Billboard)	26

== See also ==
- List of Billboard number-one dance songs of 2011
