= T-Connection =

Bahamian band

- Origin: Nassau, the Bahamas
- Genres: Funk, disco
- Years active: 1975–1984
- Labels: Capitol Records, TK Records
- Past members: Monty Brown; Theophilus "T" Coakley; Kirkwood Coakley; David Mackey; Anthony Flowers; Berkley Van Byrd

T-Connection was a funk and disco group from Nassau, the Bahamas, who scored two hits on the Billboard Hot 100 between 1977 and 1979. They did better on the US Hot Dance Music/Club Play chart, where they had five Top 10 hits, including "Do What You Wanna Do", which reached #1, and "Everything Is Cool", which peaked at #10 on the US Billboard R&B chart. In the United Kingdom, they scored five entries in the UK Singles Chart, with "Do What You Wanna Do" their highest placed success at #11.

Their track "Groove to Get Down" has been heavily sampled due to its inclusion on the 1986 Ultimate Breaks and Beats series.

Group members included the brothers Theophilus "T" and Kirkwood Coakley, plus guitarists David Mackey and Monty Brown and drummer Anthony Flowers.

Calvin Harris has stated that "Do What You Wanna Do" was a formative influence on him when he was beginning to produce music at a young age

== Discography ==
=== Albums ===
- Magic (TK Records, 1977)
- On Fire (TK Records, 1978)
- T-Connection (TK Records, 1978)
- Totally Connected (TK Records, 1980)
- Everything Is Cool (Capitol, 1981)
- Pure & Natural (Capitol, 1982)
- The Game of Life (Capitol, 1983)
- Take It to the Limit (Capitol, 1984)

=== Singles ===
Year	Single	Peak chart positions			
Year	Single	US Dance	US R&B	US Pop	UK
1976	"Disco Magic"	10	―	―	―
1977	"Do What You Wanna Do"	1	15	46	11
1977	"On Fire"	5	27	103	16
1977	"Let Yourself Go"	7	―	―	52
1978	"At Midnight"	3	32	56	53
1979	"Saturday Night"	―	28	—	41
1979	"Ecstasy"	―	―	―	―
1979	"Let's Do It Today"	―	―	―	―
1979	"Choosing"	―	―	―	―
1979	"That's Love"	―	―	―	―
1981	"Groove City"	―	47	―	―
1981	"Everything Is Cool"	―	10	―	―
1981	"A Little More Love"	―	37	―	―
1982	"Party Night"	―	―	―	―
1982	"Girl Watching"	―	―	―	―
1983	"Love Odyssey"	―	―	―	―
1984	"You Can Feel the Groove"	―	―	―	―
1984	"Take It to the Limit"	―	73	―	―
"—" denotes releases that did not chart or were not released in that territory.

== See also ==
- List of Billboard number-one dance club songs
- List of artists who reached number one on the U.S. Dance Club Songs chart
