= Feel What You Want =

Single by Kristine W

from the album Land of the Living
- Released: 1994; 1997 (Peter Ries remix); 2001 (Silk Machete & Pacha Mama remixes)
- Genre: Dance-pop; house; hi-NRG
- Length: 4:10 (Our Tribe vocal edit)
- Label: Champion Records; Dance Pool
- Songwriters: Rob Dougan; Rollo; Kristine W
- Producers: Rollo; Rob Dougan

Kristine W singles chronology
"Feel What You Want" (1994)	"One More Try" (1996)

Music video
- "Feel What You Want" on YouTube

"Feel What You Want" is a song by American singer-songwriter Kristine W, released in 1994 by Champion Records and Dance Pool as the first single from her debut album, Land of the Living (1996). It was co-written by Kristine W with its producers, British producers Rollo and Rob Dougan, and was critically acclaimed by music critics, whom praised the singer's vocal performance. The song became a huge number-one club hit in both the UK and US, as well as peaking at number four in the Netherlands and number 22 in Belgium. On the Eurochart Hot 100, it peaked at number 83 in September 1994. On the UK Singles Chart, it charted three times; first time at number 33 in 1994, then at number 40 with a 1997 remix by German producer Peter Ries and last time in 2001 at number 85. "Feel What You Want" was also featured on the soundtrack of Grand Theft Auto: Liberty City Stories on the Rise FM radio station. The accompanying music video was directed by Lindy Heymann, featuring the singer dressed as many different characters.

== Background and release ==
Kristine W (Weitz) was born in Pasco, Washington, where she and her three siblings were raised by her mother, a jazz singer and guitarist who went by the name Donna Lee. Kristine expressed an interest in music at a very young age, and regularly performed in church and for seniors at a local retirement home. She fell in love with house music after hearing it played frequently in Canada when her mother would perform at resorts there. Throughout middle and high school, Kristine frequently competed in talent shows, and at age 16, she won a state talent show singing "Last Dance" by Donna Summer. After winning the title of Miss Washington, Kristine competed in the Miss America pageant, where she won a preliminary swimsuit and NFT award. She then found success headlining her own show at the Las Vegas Hilton, winning the "Las Vegas Entertainer of the Year" award for several years.

In the summer of 1993, Champion Records boss Mel Medalie spotted the singer playing the Las Vegas show circuit. He promptly flew her into the UK and put her in a studio with producers Rollo Armstrong and Rob Dougan, StoneBridge and Johnny Jay. The song was recorded in one day. Of 10 tracks completed in the studio, "Feel What You Want" was given a limited pressing at 100 singles with a handful sent to US DJs only. It was when American DJ Junior Vasquez began playing the tune at Sound Factory in New York in Christmas 1993 that the buzz began. By that time, most of the original pressing had been scrapped to make way for new mixes. Before long, bootleg acetates began appearing on both sides of the Atlantic and Champion Records had to ask DJs such as Judge Jules to stop playing the track. In March 1994, new mixes were surfacing and the tune became one of the highlights of the Winter Music Conference in Miami with Danny Tenaglia playing it five times in his set. Pete Tong heard it in the US and it would become his essential tune for four weeks.

== Lyrics and composition ==
Kristine W wrote "Feel What You Want" with producers Rollo and Rob Dougan. When asked in an interview about how she came up with this song, she told, "My stepfather had died and I really was depressed over his sudden death. He was my mentor, really, and one of my heroes. And he died of an aneurysm really suddenly. So that was really feeling his loss. That song just made me think about everything from religion to pollution to the planet. I wove a lot of things that I was feeling into that song. 'Sun rises at 9, it departs at 5 again, ain't doing overtime no more. In this world of color the brightest pictures are plugged right into your wall,' in television, you know, it just seemed like everything on the news was depressing. So when you're depressed it even seems more depressing. I felt like I was numb from the death and I was not living anymore. I was just kind of existing.

== Critical reception ==
Upon the release, "Feel What You Want" received critical acclaim from music critics. AllMusic editor John Bush felt that on the song, Kristine W. proves that she probably is "the most soulful vocalist in dance music, period." Larry Flick from Billboard magazine wrote that after being the center of a fierce major-label bidding war, "this European dance/pop smash is finally available domestically—and the odds are mighty good that it will meet with similar success here both on dancefloors and over radio airwaves. Kristine has a striking voice, and she turns in an urgent performance that transforms the house-rooted song into an anthem to be reckoned with. Will sound great on boom-boxes on the beach." William Stevensen from Entertainment Weekly named it an "infectious anthem". Pan-European magazine Music & Media said, "A keyboard and a voice alone usually lead to a ballad. Dance has its own rules though. If there was a prize for the most sparsely arranged pop dance record, this track would win." Andy Beevers from Music Week gave it a full score of five out of five and named it Pick of the Week in the category of Dance, stating that "the uplifting and catchy song is highly distinctive." In April 1997, Music Week editor Alan Jones named it "haunting" and "one of the finest Rollo/Sister Bliss creations".

Michael Morley from Muzik described it as "storming". A reviewer from The Network Forty remarked that it is "displaying a unique dance groove". Ben Wener from Orange County Register called it "irresistible". People Magazine named "Feel What You Want" as the "standout cut" on the Land of the Living album, noting "the thumping house rhythm, exuberant keyboard motif and her whopping vocal". Brad Beatnik from the Record Mirror Dance Update wrote, "A record that needs no introduction, suffice to say that if you haven't heard, or heard of, it by now, you must be living like a hermit. The deliciously deep, swinging tune is topped by Kristine's restrained garage vocals and is at its most upfront and moody on the Our Tribe mix." Another RM editor, James Hamilton, declared it as "Vegas lounge singer's Rollo & Rob-D created sparse organ stabbed expressive garage skipper" in his weekly dance column. Frank Own for Vibe named it the 'Vocal House Cut of the Year' and constated that the former Vegas lounge singer "moved the muscle boys this year with this sparse, smoldering floor filler."

== Music video ==
A music video was produced to promote the single, directed by British director Lindy Heymann. It features Kristine W. performing the song dressed as many different characters, including as a clown and Elvis Presley. Heyman would also direct the video for the singer's next single, "One More Try".

== Impact and legacy ==
British DJ Magazine ranked "Feel What You Want" number 91 in their list of "Top 100 Club Tunes" in 1998. Belgian annual electronic dance music festival Tomorrowland featured the song in their official list of "The Ibiza 500" in 2020.

== Track listing ==
- 12", UK (1994)

A1. "Feel What You Want" (Our Tribe Vocal) – 5:28
A2. "Feel What You Want" (Junior's Factory Dub) – 7:53
B1. "Feel What You Want" (Dignity Vocal Mix) – 8:15
B2. "Feel What You Want" (Diss-Cuss Vox) – 7:19

- 12" Remixes, Germany (1997)

A. "Feel What You Want" (Dekkard's Offworld Vocal) – 12:37
B1. "Feel What You Want" (Junior's N.Y. X-Tended Vocal) – 5:59
B2. "Feel What You Want" (PeeRee's Extended) – 6:30

- CD single, UK (1994)
1. "Feel What You Want" (Our Tribe Vocal) – 5:28
2. "Feel What You Want" (Dignity Vocal Mix) – 8:15
3. "Feel What You Want" (Junior's Factory Mix) – 9:03
4. "Feel What You Want" (Kerri Chandler) – 6:10
5. "Feel What You Want" (Development Corp) – 7:11
- CD single, UK (1997)
1. "Feel What You Want" (Dekkard's Offworld Vocal Edit) – 4:38
2. "Feel What You Want" (Greenlight Vocal Remix Edit) – 4:19
3. "Feel What You Want" (Rollo's Rhythm Radio Mix Edit) – 4:34
4. "Feel What You Want" (Junior's N.Y. X-tended Vocal Edit) – 4:03
- CD maxi, Germany (1994)
1. "Feel What You Want" (Our Tribe Vocal Edit) – 4:11
2. "Feel What You Want" (Development Corp Edit) – 4:03
3. "Feel What You Want" (Our Tribe Vocal) – 5:29
4. "Feel What You Want" (Dignity Vocal Mix) – 8:15
5. "Feel What You Want" (Diss-Cuss Vox) – 7:19
6. "Feel What You Want" (Kerri Chandler Edit) – 4:16
- CD maxi, Netherlands (1994)
1. "Feel What You Want" (Our Tribe Vocal (Edit)) – 4:14
2. "Feel What You Want" (Our Tribe Vocal) – 5:30
3. "Feel What You Want" (Junior's Factory Dub) – 7:56
4. "Feel What You Want" (Dignity Vocal Mix) – 8:18
5. "Feel What You Want" (Diss-Cuss Vox) – 7:22
6. "Feel What You Want" (Junior's Factory Mix) – 9:06
7. "Feel What You Want" (Our Tribe Dub) – 4:48
8. "Feel What You Want" (Kerri Chandler) – 6:13
9. "Feel What You Want" (Development Corporation) – 7:12
- CD maxi, Scandinavia (1994)
1. "Feel What You Want" (Our Tribe Vocal Edit) – 4:10
2. "Feel What You Want" (Our Tribe Vocal) – 5:27
3. "Feel What You Want" (Dignity Vocal Mix) – 8:15
- Cassette single, US (1994)

A1. "Feel What You Want" (Our Tribe Vocal Radio Edit)
A2. "Feel What You Want" (Kerri Chandler Mix)
B1. "Feel What You Want" (Our Tribe Vocal Radio Edit)
B2. "Feel What You Want" (Kerri Chandler Mix)

- Cassette maxi single, US (1994)

A1. "Feel What You Want" (Our Tribe Vocal)
A2. "Feel What You Want" (Development Corporation)
B1. "Feel What You Want" (Dignity Vocal Mix)
B2. "Feel What You Want" (Junior's Factory Mix)

== Personnel ==
- Guitar by Skinny Jules
- All tracks written by Rob D., Rollo & Kristine W.
- Published by BMG Music/Champion Music.
- Licensed from Champion Records.

== Remixes ==
"Feel What You Want" has been remixed and released many times between 2001 and 2010 as listed below:

1. "Feel What You Want" (2001 remix by Deep Swing / Pacha Mama (Olivier Berger & Stephan Luke) / Silk Machete)
2. "Feel What You Want" (2004 remix by Cuba Libre)
3. "Feel What You Want" (2005 remix by Musaphia & Mayhem)
4. "Feel What You Want" (2006 remix by DJ Tekin)
5. "Feel What You Want" (2008 remix by Mark Simmons / Razor N' Guido)
6. "Feel What You Want" (2009 remix by Bingo Players / Oliver Lang & Danny Whitehead / Danny Dove & Steve Smart)

== Charts ==
=== Weekly charts ===
Chart (1994-1995)	Peak position
Belgium (Ultratop 50 Flanders)	22
Europe (Eurochart Hot 100)	83
Greece (Pop + Rock)	12
Netherlands (Dutch Top 40)	4
Netherlands (Single Top 100)	5
Scotland (OCC)	67
UK Singles (OCC)	33
UK Dance (OCC)	17
UK Dance (Music Week)	1
UK Club Chart (Music Week)	1
US Hot Dance Club Play (Billboard)	1
US Maxi-Singles Sales (Billboard)	21

Chart (1997)	Peak position
Belgium Dance (Ultratop)	12
Europe (Eurochart Hot 100)	98
Scotland (OCC)	53
UK Singles (OCC)	40
UK Dance (OCC)	5
UK Club Chart (Music Week)	1

Chart (2001)	Peak position
UK Singles (OCC)	85

Chart (2009)	Peak position
Netherlands (Single Top 100)	63

Chart (2010)	Peak position
US Smooth Jazz Airplay (Billboard)	22

=== Year-end charts ===
Chart (1994)	Position
Netherlands (Dutch Top 40)	47
Netherlands (Single Top 100)	46
UK Club Chart (Music Week)	6

Chart (1997)	Position
UK Club Chart (Music Week)	5

== See also ==
- List of Billboard number-one dance singles of 1994
- List of artists who reached number one on the U.S. Dance Club Songs chart
