= Stronger (Kristine W album) =

Studio album by Kristine W
- Released: 2000
- Genre: Dance; house
- Length: 53:21
- Label: BMG Entertainment

Kristine W chronology
Land of the Living (1996)	Stronger (2000)	Fly Again (2003)

Professional ratings
Review scores
Source	Rating
AllMusic	2.5/5 stars

Stronger is the second album from singer-songwriter, Kristine W. The songs are mostly Dance with a few soulful House pop songs in the mix.

"Stronger", "Lovin' You" and "Clubland" were released as singles.

== Track listing ==
No.	Title	Writer(s)	Length
1.	"Stronger"	Kristine Weitz; Jud J. Friedman; Allan Rich	5:16
2.	"Lovin' You"	Kristine Weitz; Johnny Pedersen; Karsten Dahlgaard; Maria Christensen; Vincent Degiorgio	3:29
3.	"If Only You Knew"	Stephanie Lewis; Mark Hammond; Maria Christensen	3:58
4.	"Pieces of Me and You"	Kristine Weitz; Sylvia Bennet-Smith; Reed Vertelney; Marc Smith	3:41
5.	"Shower the People"	James Taylor	3:46
6.	"Clubland"	Kristine Weitz; Peter Ries	3:48
7.	"Never Been Kissed"	Kristine Weitz; Gerry DeVeaux; Sten Hallström	3:28
8.	"Waters Run Deep"	Kristine Weitz; Peter Ries	5:13
9.	"Let Love Reign"	Kristine Weitz; Janice Robinson; Mark Godwin	4:19
10.	"Stand in Love"	Jud J. Friedman; Allan Rich	3:39
11.	"That's How it Goes"	Kristine Weitz; Peter Zizzo	4:43
12.	"All that Glitters"	Kristine Weitz; Peter Ries	4:16
13.	"Someone (Watching Over Me)"	Kristine Weitz; Tony Moran; Tony Coluccio; Andy Panda	3:45
Total length:			53:21

Japan bonus tracks
No.	Title	Length
14.	"Who I Am" (Vocal Up Version)	3:50
15.	"The River Divides" (Radio Edit)	4:18
Total length:		61:29
