= The Power of Music (song) =

Single by Kristine W

from the album The Power of Music
- Released: December 29, 2009
- Genre: Dance music
- Label: Fly Again Music
- Songwriter: Kristine W
- Producer: Kristine W

Kristine W singles chronology
"Be Alright" (2009)	"The Power of Music" (2009)	"Fade" (2011)

"The Power of Music" is the title track and sixth single from Kristine W's 2009 album The Power of Music featuring the rapper Big Daddy Kane released on December 29, 2009. With the March 13, 2010 issue of Billboard, "The Power of Music" became Kristine W's 15th number-one dance hit, tying her with Mariah Carey as the artist with the 7th most number ones on the Dance/Club Play Songs chart after Madonna at number one and Janet Jackson at number two.

== Track listing ==
U.S. Maxi CD

1. "The Power of Music" (Wideboys Stadium Radio Mix)
2. "The Power of Music" (Groove Police Big Daddy Radio Mix)
3. "The Power of Music" (Tony Moran ML Radio Mix)
4. "The Power of Music" (Virgo Brothers Astro Electro Radio Mix)
5. "The Power of Music" (Joe Gauthreaux G-Force Radio Mix)
6. "The Power of Music" (Sweet Team POM Radio Mix)
7. "The Power of Music" (Wideboys Stadium Club Mix)
8. "The Power of Music" (Groove Police Big Daddy Club Mix)
9. "The Power of Music" (Tony Moran ML Club Mix)
10. "The Power of Music" (Virgo Brothers Astro Electro Club Mix)
11. "The Power of Music" (Joe Gauthreaux G-Force Club Mix)
12. "The Power of Music" (Sweet Team POM Club Mix)
13. "The Power of Music" (Wideboys Stadium Kane Dub Mix)
14. "The Power of Music" (Groove Police Big Dub Mix)
