= The Power of Music (Kristine W album) =

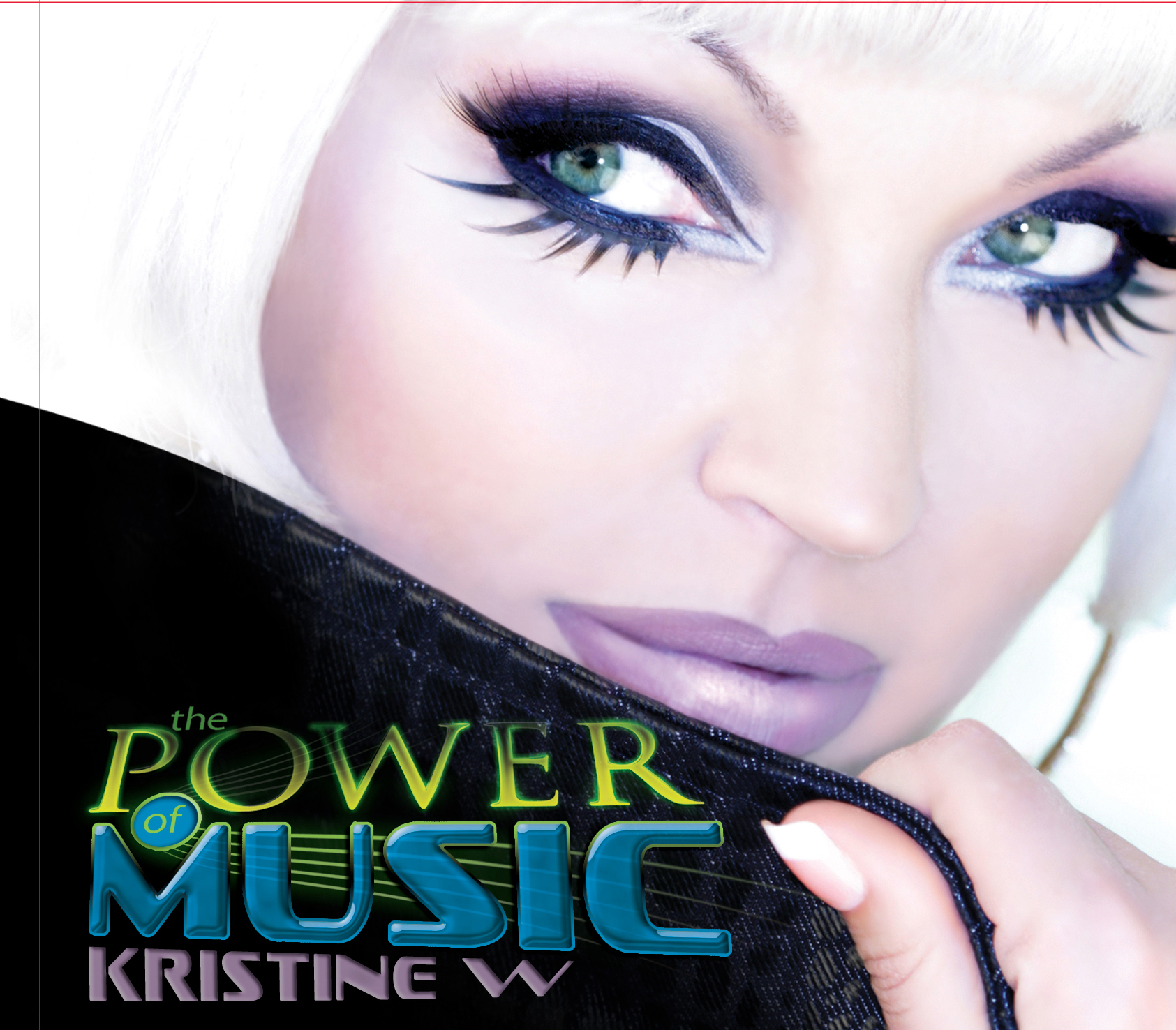

Studio album by Kristine W
- Released: June 16, 2009
- Label: Fly Again
- Producer: Peter Masitti

Kristine W chronology
| Fly Again (2003) | The Power of Music (2009) | Straight Up with a Twist (2010) |

The Power of Music is the fourth full-length album from Kristine W, released on June 16, 2009.

== Track listing ==
1. "Be Alright"
2. "The Power of Music"
3. "Into U"
4. "Never"
5. "Not So Merry Go Round"
6. "Fade"
7. "Walk Away"
8. "Feel What You Want"
9. "The Boss"
10. "Love Is the Look"
11. "Window to Your World"
12. "Strings"
13. "Do You Really Want Me"
14. "The Groove's Inside"
15. "Happiness"
16. "Meet Again"
