= Be Alright (Kristine W song) =

Single by Kristine W

from the album The Power of Music
- Released: 2009
- Genre: Dance music
- Label: Fly Again Music
- Songwriter(s): Kristine W
- Producer(s): Kristine W

Kristine W singles chronology
| "Love Is the Look" (2009) | "Be Alright" (2009) | "The Power of Music" (2009) |

"Be Alright" is the fifth single from Kristine W's 2009 album The Power of Music. The single went to #1 on the Billboard Hot Dance Club Songs becoming the artist's fourteenth number one single.

== Track listing ==
U.S. Maxi CD

1. "Be Alright" (Hex Hector Master Radio)
2. "Be Alright" (Boris Blind Faith Radio)
3. "Be Alright" (Tom Stephan All Right All Night Radio)
4. "Be Alright" (Perry Twins Los Angeles and Demons Radio)
5. "Be Alright" (Bass Mekanik Full Bump Mix)
6. "Be Alright" (Joe Carrano Be Amazed Radio)
7. "Be Alright" (Neil Case Island Groove Radio)
8. "Be Alright" (Tom Stephan All Right All Night Dub Radio)
9. "Be Alright" (Boris Blind Faith Club)
10. "Be Alright" (Tom Stephan All Right All Night Dub)
11. "Be Alright" (Perry Twins Los Angeles and Demons Club)
12. "Be Alright" (Joe Carrano Be Amazed Club)
13. "Be Alright" (Offer Nissim Forever Tel Aviv Club)
14. "Be Alright" (Joe Carrano New World Radio)

== Chart performance ==
| Chart (2009) | Peak position |
|---|---|
| U.S. Hot Dance Club Songs | 1 |
