= Do What You Wanna Do =

Single by T-Connection

from the album Magic
- B-side: "Mothers Love"
- Released: March 1977
- Recorded: 1977
- Genre: Disco
- Length: 3:33
- Label: Dash
- Producers: Cory Wade, Alex Sadkin

T-Connection singles chronology
"Disco Magic" (1976)	"Do What You Wanna Do" (1977)	"On Fire" (1977)

"Do What You Wanna Do" is the debut 1977 single by Nassau, Bahamas based group, T-Connection. The single reached number one on the disco/dance chart in the US for seven weeks. The single made it to #15 on the soul charts and peaked at #46 on the US pop chart.
