= Kristine W =

American musician and entrepreneur

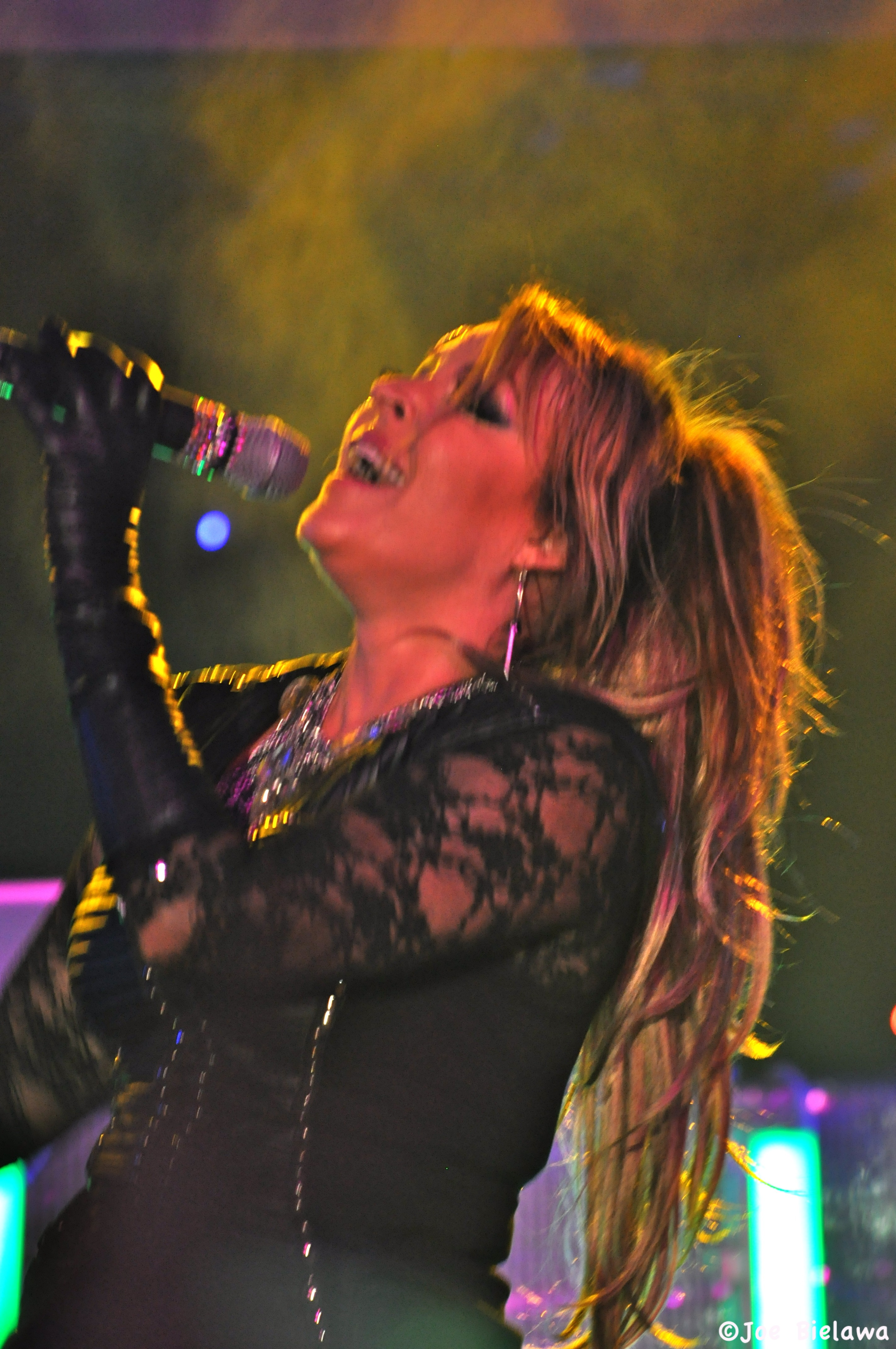
- Performing at Krave in 2012

Background information
- Born: Kristine Elizabeth Weitz; June 8, 1962 (age 64); Pasco, Washington, U.S.
- Genres: Dance; house; electronic; jazz
- Occupations: Singer, songwriter, record producer, owner of Fly Again Music
- Instruments: Vocals, guitar, saxophone, piano, drums, bass
- Years active: 1985–present (singer)
- Labels: RCA/BMG, Tommy Boy Entertainment, Fly Again Music
- Website: Official Website

Kristine Elizabeth Weitz (born June 8, 1962), widely known by her stage name Kristine W, is an American singer, songwriter, multi-instrumentalist, and entrepreneur. She is most widely known as a dance music artist. Born and raised in Pasco, Washington, she found early success competing in pageants and talent contests, winning Miss Washington 1981 and a Preliminary Swimsuit Award as well as a Non-Finalist Talent award in the Miss America pageant. Kristine W is now one of the most popular dance club artists of all time, with 17 No. 1s to date on the Billboard Dance Club Songs chart. She is currently listed among Billboard's 8 Greatest of All Time Top Dance Club Artists, and she was ranked number three in Billboard's Top Dance Artists of the Decade. She is especially popular in the gay community and is an outspoken supporter of LGBT rights, frequently performing at pride rallies and charity events for pro-LGBT organizations throughout the U.S.

After competing in Miss America, Kristine W moved to Las Vegas, where she regularly performed at the Las Vegas Hilton and won 'Las Vegas Entertainer of the Year' for several years. Kristine W was recognized by the city of Las Vegas for her record-breaking number of shows, which led to June 28 being officially designated as Kristine W Day by the state of Nevada. Those performances led to her first record deal and subsequent debut single, “Feel What You Want”, marking the singer's first of 17 No. 1s on the Billboard Dance Club Songs chart. Kristine W is also tied for third place with Beyoncé for the most consecutive No. 1 hits with nine. In addition, her album The Power of Music is one of only three albums in the history of the chart to produce at least seven No. 1s from one album (Katy Perry's Teenage Dream [2010] also had seven, and Rihanna's Anti [2016] had eight).

== Early life ==
Kristine W was born in Pasco, Washington, where she and her three siblings were raised by her mother, a jazz singer and guitarist who went by the name Donna Lee. Kristine W expressed an interest in music at a very young age. Her grandmother was a classically trained violinist and pianist who taught Kristine how to play the piano. At age 9, Kristine also began playing the saxophone, and it was from her mother that Kristine developed an interest in jazz. Growing up, Kristine would regularly perform in church and for seniors at a local retirement home, which she has stated helped her to overcome her stage fright. Regarding her musical influence, Kristine W fell in love with house music after hearing it played frequently in Canada when her mother would perform at resorts there.

From an early age, it was clear Kristine had an aptitude for performing. Throughout middle and high school, Kristine frequently competed in talent shows, and she won numerous awards in the Northwest after competing in jazz choir ensembles as an improvisational soloist. At age 16, she won a state talent show singing the Donna Summer song, “Last Dance”. This led her to enter pageants, which she excelled at. After winning the titles of Miss Tri-Cities and Miss Washington, Kristine competed in the Miss America pageant, where she won a preliminary swimsuit and NFT award. Her winnings were designated for education, so she enrolled at the University of Nevada in Las Vegas and began pursuing her musical dreams. Her mentor, John R. Lewis, helped Kristine W to form a band called Kristine and the Sting, with whom she recorded an indie album called Show and Tell. The band was a local favorite, amassing numerous awards. After the release of Show and Tell, Kristine began traveling to California to work with an R&B production house. The songs she would record with them eventually became the material for her first album, The Perfect Beat, self-released in 1994.

== Career ==
=== 1991–2000: "Feel What You Want" – Stronger ===
It was in Las Vegas that Kristine found success headlining her own show at the Las Vegas Hilton, winning the 'Las Vegas Entertainer of the Year' award for several years. After the Hilton tore down their 200-seat live venue and replaced it with a 500-seat nightclub in 1995, Kristine continued to perform for 2 to 3 shows per night, leading a 14-piece band. The act was called Kristine W's Come See the Music, and they performed until 1999, by which time their residency at the Vegas Hilton spanned 8 years in total. On June 28, 1999, the governor and entertainment director for the city of Las Vegas officially recognized Kristine as having performed more live shows at the Las Vegas Hilton than any other performer in its history, including Elvis Presley, and officially designated June 28 "Kristine W Day" in the state of Nevada. During her residency, the president of British label Champion Records heard Kristine W perform at the Hilton, which lead to the label signing the artist. She consequently traveled to London, a move Kristine has called "a leap of faith", where she recorded her first single "Feel What You Want" in a day.

Released in 1994, her debut single quickly became a hit, receiving worldwide acclaim and becoming her first No. 1 on the Billboard Dance Club Songs chart in the U.S. "Feel What You Want" was also a massive success in the UK, reaching No. 1 on the UK singles chart. Kristine wrote the lyrics for the song in response to the passing of her stepfather, stating in an interview, “He was my mentor, really, and one of my heroes. And he died of an aneurysm really suddenly. So, that was really feeling his loss. That song just made me think about everything from religion to pollution to the planet. I wove a lot of things that I was feeling into that song.” Following the release of the single and subsequent interviews, many interviewers "butchered" Kristine Weitz' last name; it was therefore suggested by the president of the label she was signed to that she should instead go by Kristine W.

"Feel What You Want" became popular in the LGBTQ community. In an interview with Songfacts, Kristine W said, “That became their mantra. ‘Feel what you want it to be, what you want it to feel’ became this massive gay anthem, and I didn't even know that it was. So, that was a surprise. And it was really a cool surprise, because I got this fan base that was amazingly fun and supportive.”

"Feel What You Want" was subsequently featured on her 1996 debut album, Land of the Living, which spawned numerous other No. 1 dance hits for Kristine; “One More Try” and the title track from the album both reached No. 1 on Billboard Dance Club Songs. "Land of the Living" had particular importance to those afflicted with AIDS and was chosen as the album's third single in 1997 because, Kristine says, “It was right at the time when AIDS had stopped becoming a death sentence". Billboard named "One More Try" its Single of the Week, and it was written in Billboard Magazine, "The long-anticipated follow-up to the massive 'Feel What U Want' is a true rarity in dance music. It makes a pensive and poignant lyrical point without clouding the track's overall potential to inspire active twitchin' and twirlin'. Producers Rollo and Rob D. have created a grand disco/house arrangement that allows Kristine to shine like the star she deserves to be". The success of the album led to Kristine W being named the 1997 'Best New Dance Artist' by Billboard. In later years, the song "Feel What You Want" was included in Grand Theft Auto: Liberty City Stories on the Rise FM station.

Kristine's sophomore album, Stronger, was released in 2000 and received commercial and critical acclaim; both of the album's official singles – including the title track – reached No. 1 on Billboard Dance Club Songs, and “Lovin’ You” was featured in an episode of the Showtime television series Queer As Folk. Stylistically, Kristine W expanded on the dance and house music influences prevalent on her first album, this time incorporating more adult contemporary, R&B, and pop influences. About the album's lyrical themes, Kristine has said, “Stronger came about when my grandmother was ailing and when I had my first baby... watching life come into the world and watching life go out was traumatic at the time; I had to be strong for my baby and for my grandmother.”!!

=== 2001–2005: Diagnosis of leukemia and Fly Again ===
Following the release of Stronger, Kristine W began exhibiting unusual physical symptoms, for which she sought medical advice. No medical abnormalities were detected at the time. However, during a performance in Japan, Kristine experienced persistent bleeding, to the point where friends urged her to again see a doctor, who ordered a blood test. The results came back on Mother's Day of 2001, revealing that the mother of two then-toddlers had Acute Myeloid Leukemia. Kristine was given 30% chance of living and she spent the next year in the UCLA Medical Center. She recounts, “I remember when I was in the hospital at UCLA being treated. I told myself, ‘Okay, when you wrote [Land of the Living], you meant it. And now you’ve got to live it. This is for real. This isn’t about words or music—this is about you not being on the planet anymore.”

Kristine had a stem cell transplant on September 11, 2001. Regarding the 9/11 terror attacks, Kristine recalls witnessing the second plane hitting the World Trade Center on television from her hospital bed, which she described as “very devastating”. The procedure itself was, fortunately, a success, and her AML is currently in remission.

During her stay in the hospital, Kristine W wrote the songs that would later become her third album, Fly Again. Its creation was cathartic for her, as she stated in an interview, “Fly Again really helped me begin to heal after having leukemia. I'm really thankful for that album because it probably gave me enough fight to keep going. You have to live for something. I have my kids, but my music got me fired up. We shot that video and I saw it for the first time, and I thought, 'I'm going to live.’”

The album Fly Again was released in 2003 and was a commercial and critical success, reaching No. 12 on Billboard Top Dance/Electronic Albums. Two of the album’s four singles, "Some Lovin'" and "Save My Soul", reached No. 1 on the Billboard Dance Club Songs chart immediately following the album's release. The other two singles, "The Wonder of It All" and "Fly Again", reached No. 1 following the subsequent release of remixes for each. "I'll Be Your Light", another song from Stronger, peaking at No. 2 on Billboard Dance Club Songs. Each of the album’s singles, except for the title track, also charted on Dance/Mix Show Airplay.

In 2005, Kristine W performed a duet with soul diva Patti LaBelle, which was included on LaBelle's Classic Moments album. The song was a cover of Kristine own's “Land of the Living”.

=== 2007–2009: Fly Again Music and The Power of Music ===
In 2007, Kristine W was featured on a song by artist Tony Moran titled "Walk Away," which peaked at No. 1 on Billboard Dance Club Songs. A remix album for the track, titled Walk Away – Remixed & Remastered was released in 2010.

In January 2008, Kristine W formed her own record label, called Fly Again Music, which she currently owns and operates. Her first release on the label was "The Boss", a single that reached No. 1 on Billboard. On this release, Kristine covers the Diana Ross song from which the album is named, accompanied by a host of remixes spanning several genres of dance music. About the album, Kristine says, “My idols growing up in Washington state were Donna Summer and Diana Ross. I just loved them and was always singing their songs and studying them. When I decided to start my own record label in January of 2008, I knew "The Boss" would be the perfect first single to put out. I was taking control—being "The Boss" of my music, sink or swim—and I put all I had into that single and those remixes. It was so well received globally that I was really a bit taken back by it.”

That same year, Kristine released "Never", a single from her then-upcoming album, featuring a variety of remixes.

Following "The Boss" and "Never", Kristine W released The Power of Music in 2009. The album produced six No. 1s on Billboard Dance Club Songs, one of three albums in history to do so. The others were Beyoncé's I Am… Sasha Fierce (2008), also achieving six, and Katy Perry's Teenage Dream (2010) at seven. Also released in 2009 was Kristine W’s Love Is The Look, to support the single of the same name, accompanied by a host of remixes. Notably, Ralphi Rosario produced a remix that was sponsored by K-Y; the track was titled "Love Is The Look (Ralphi Rosario K-Y INTRIGUE Mix)".

=== 2010–2013: Straight Up with a Twist – New and Number Ones ===
Kristine W’s next album Straight Up with a Twist (released in 2010) was a significant stylistic departure from her previous releases. A two-part album, CD 1 featured covers of her own previous works, redone in a smooth jazz style with all acoustic instrumentation. CD 2 featured electro lounge versions of the tracks. As such, they featured electronic instrumentation, but at much slower BPMs than is commonly heard in dance music. Although the jazz endeavor was far-removed from the four-on-the-floor songs Kristine W is known for, it received critical and commercial acclaim, peaking at number 22 on the Billboard Jazz Albums chart. In addition, the version of "Feel What You Want" from the album peaked at number 22 on the Billboard Smooth Jazz Songs chart.

A three-part release of remixes for Kristine W’s single "Fade" was released in 2011, which helped to propel the track to the number one spot on the Billboard Dance Club Songs chart, marking her 16th No. 1 and solidifying her love for DJs. Kristine's adventurous Christmas-themed dance music EP, Mary Did You Know, was released the same year. Kristine W's EP What I Like About You, on which the artist covered the song originally performed by American rock band The Romantics, was also released in 2011.

2012 marked the release of Kristine W's two-part album New and Number Ones. This was a unique release in that it featured all-new remixes of some of her biggest hits prior to that point, including by Grammy Award-winning DJ StoneBridge as well as seven entirely original songs. Also featured on the album was Kristine's rendition of the Donna Summer song, "Sometimes Like Butterflies", the second time she has paid homage to her childhood idol. The album itself gained popularity both in and outside of the club scene, reaching number 19 on Billboard Top Dance/Electronic Albums and number 14 on Billboard Heatseekers, while the tracks "So Close to Me" and "Everything That I Got" (Bimbo Jones Peak Hour Club Mix) peaked at numbers 2 and 4 on the Billboard Dance Club Songs chart, respectively.

So Close to Me: Global Sessions was released in 2013, marking Kristine W's first collaboration with several more highly regarded and influential DJs and producers throughout the world, including UK radio's Andi Durrant (Kiss, Capital, Nova FM), American house DJ Joe Gauthreaux, Miami DJ Oscar G (of club duo Murk), Canadian house act Cosmic Dawn (frequent remixer of Hanne Leland's singles), and producer Steve More. Also released that year was Kristine's remix album So Close to Me: New & Now, which included works by Junior Vasquez and female disc jockey, DJ Ting.

=== 2014–present: Love Come Home – Stars, upcoming album ===
In 2014, Kristine W released a three-part album, Love Come Home. Part 1 featured all new mixes of her 1995 single, "Love Come Home". Parts 2 and 3 featured additional remixes, and Part 2 also included new remixes of "Everything That I Got". The three-part release was a club hit, with "Love Come Home" and "Everything That I Got" both reaching No. 4 on Billboard Dance Club Songs, with the former also charting on Billboard Hot Dance/Electronic Songs at No. 26.

The Kristine W single "Out There" dropped in 2016, accompanied by an additional host of remixes (including those of the disco genre) on the album titled Out There: Remixed. The single reached No. 3 on Billboard.

The following year, Kristine W's dance-pop single "Stars" was released, peaking at No. 1 on Billboard dance and becoming the artist's 17th No. 1 to date. She co-wrote the song with rock and hip-hop producer/mix engineer Nikka Bling. Mixes by four different artists accompanied the single's release, including the Vegas Strong Candlelight Mix, in which all percussion was notably excluded. Toward the end of 2017, a remix album for Stars was released, titled Stars: A Galaxy of Remixes, featuring additional works by Freejak, alongside other producers.

Recently, Kristine W said in a Facebook comment that a new album is actively in development, stating, “[…] we’re nearing the end game.” Her album Episode One: Love and Lies was released in February 2020.

== Relationship with the LGBT community ==
Kristine W's large support has come from the LGBT community since she released her first single, “Feel What You Want”. She is a supporter of the gay community and advocate of LGBT rights – she regularly performs at pride rallies and for pro-LGBT charity organizations across the nation, including those dedicated to fighting AIDS and other HIV-related illnesses.

She is longtime friends with famed drag performer and musician RuPaul, and co-wrote the song "Just a Little In and Out" on his 2004 album Red Hot. Kristine W has performed numerous times at RuPaul's annual DragCon, and in 2024 appeared as a guest judge on season 9 of RuPaul's Drag Race All Stars.

Kristine W reflected: "My relationship with the gay community has been a huge blessing. God knew I needed an army of soldiers to get my message of love, hope, faith and tolerance out to the world and He bound us together."

Kristine W said she first realized she had such a big gay following during a 1994 New York performance for NYC DJ Junior Vasquez at Sound Factory. “I remember going into the club and nobody knew who I was. I think they were all expecting a black girl. I just walked right past the whole crowd. There were a couple of thousand men and no AC. Everyone was just dripping wet. I loved it! I was like, ‘This is great! Look at all these hot guys. This is like a freaking garden, a bouquet of loveliness. It’s a banquet, and where do I start?’ I turned to one of the guys with me and said, ‘These guys are so hot it’s ridiculous.’ And he said, ‘Don’t get too excited. This is a gay party.’ So that was my first experience and I was like, ‘This is hot.’ I loved it."

The gay community has also served as a place of solace from the sexism she's faced throughout her career. Kristine stated in a radio interview, “[The gay community] gave me a place I can focus on my music and not have to worry about all the other weird stuff going on.”

Among her many pride performances, Kristine W headlined all three of Arizona's pride festivals (Phoenix, Tucson, and Flagstaff) in 2018. Recently, she has performed at Chicago's Human First Gala, an annual fundraising event celebrating organizations and businesses who have contributed to the local LGBT community. Kristine W also has a series of upcoming performances in celebration of Pride Month and Pride Summer, including at the 2019 Queens Pride Parade and Festival in New York, and the OC Pride Festival in California.

== Other accolades ==
While Kristine W was regularly performing at the Hilton in Las Vegas, her friend, actress Julie Michaels (best known for her role opposite of Patrick Swayze in Road House), played Kristine's music on set during the making of that movie. This led to Kristine W's "Do You Really Want Me" to be included in the movie's soundtrack. In addition, movie director Adrian Lyne saw one of Kristine's performances. He was such a fan of her set that it ultimately led to Kristine W's appearance in the film Indecent Proposal (starring Robert Redford and Demi Moore), in which Kristine sang her song “EZ Come EZ Go”.

Kristine W's 1994 debut single "Feel What You Want" was later featured in the soundtrack of the video game Grand Theft Auto: Liberty City Stories. In addition, several of her songs have appeared on the soundtrack of the TV series Queer as Folk, including "Some Lovin'" and "Lovin' You".

== Awards and nominations ==
=== International Dance Music Awards ===
Year	Nominee / work	Award	Result
2004	"Some Lovin'" (with Murk)	Best House/Garage Dance Track	Won
2004	Herself	Best Dance Artist (Solo)	Won
2005	Herself	Best Dance Artist (Solo)	Nominated
2006	Herself	Best Dance Artist (Solo)	Nominated
2007	Herself	Best Dance Artist (Solo)	Nominated

== Discography ==
=== Albums ===
- Perfect Beat (1994), Plain Rap Records
- Land of the Living (1996), RCA
- Stronger (2000), RCA
- Fly Again (2003), Tommy Boy
- The Power of Music (2009), Fly Again Music
- Straight Up with a Twist (2010), Fly Again Music
- New & Number Ones (Club Mixes Part 1–2) (2012), Fly Again Music
- Episode One: Love and Lies (2020), Fly Again Music
- Dance With Me (2026), Fly Again Music

=== Singles ===
==== As lead artist ====
Year	Title	Peak positions				Album
Year	Title	NLD	US	US Dance	UK	Album
1985	"Head Games"	—	—	—	—	Non-album singles
1989	"All I Need Is Your Love"	—	—	—	—	Non-album singles
1991	"Show and Tell" (as Kristine and the Sting)	—	—	—	—	Non-album singles
1994	"Feel What You Want"	5	—	1	33	Land of the Living
1996	"One More Try"	16	78	1	41	Land of the Living
1996	"Land of the Living"	44	—	1	57	Land of the Living
2000	"Stronger"	—	—	1	—	Stronger
2001	"Lovin' You"	—	—	1	—	Stronger
2003	"Some Lovin'" (Murk vs. Kristine W)	—	—	1	—	Murk
2003	"Fly Again"	—	—	1	—	Fly Again
2004	"Save My Soul"	—	—	1	—	Fly Again
2005	"The Wonder of It All (Remixes)"	—	—	1	—	Fly Again
2006	"I'll Be Your Light"	—	—	2	—	Fly Again
2008	"The Boss"	—	—	1	—	The Power of Music
2008	"Never"	—	—	1	—	The Power of Music
2009	"Love Is the Look"	—	—	1	—	The Power of Music
2009	"Be Alright"	—	—	1	—	The Power of Music
2009	"The Power of Music"	—	—	1	—	The Power of Music
2011	"Fade"	—	—	1	—	The Power of Music
2012	"Everything That I Got"	—	—	4	—	New & Number Ones
2013	"So Close to Me"	—	—	2	—	New & Number Ones
2014	"Love Come Home" (2014)	—	—	4	—	New & Number Ones
2016	"Out There"	—	—	3	—	Out There
2017	"Stars"	—	—	1	—	Stars
2020	"Just A Lie"	—	—	11	—	Episode One: Love and Lies
2020	"Barracuda"	—	—	—	—	Episode One: Love and Lies
2020	"Wind In The Trees"	—	—	—	—	Episode One: Love and Lies
2020	"Can't Take No More"	—	—	—	—	Episode One: Love and Lies
2021	"No One"	—	—	—	—	Episode One: Love and Lies
2022	"Can't Look Back"	—	—	—	—	Non-album singles
2023	"By My Side"	—	—	—	—	Non-album singles
2024	"Smooth Operator"	—	—	—	—	Non-album singles
2025	"Love Personified"	—	—	—	—	Dance With Me
2026	"Next To You"	—	—	—	—	Dance With Me

==== As featured artist ====
Year	Title	Peak positions		Album
Year	Title	US Dance	UK	Album
1994	"Love Come Home" (1994 Version) (Our Tribe featuring Frankë Pharaoh and Kristine W)	—	33	Non-album single
2007	"Walk Away" (Tony Moran featuring Kristine W)	1	—	The Event / The Power of Music

=== Other singles ===
- "Don't Wanna Think" (1995), Champion Records
- "O Holy Night" (2001), Tommy Boy
- "Hey, Mr. Christmas" (2008), Fly Again Music
- "What I Like About You" (2011), Fly Again Music
- "Christmas Bells" (2011), Fly Again Music
- "On the Radio" (2011), Fly Again Music
- "Mary Did You Know" (2011), Fly Again Music
- "Every Day's a Holiday" (2011), Fly Again Music

== Filmography ==
=== Film ===
Year	Title	Role	Productions	Notes
1986	Permainan Yang Nakal	Angela	Soraya Intercine Films	Indonesian films
1987	Akibat Terlalu Bebas	Kristin	Soraya Intercine Films	Indonesian films

== See also ==
- List of artists who reached number one on the U.S. Dance Club Songs chart
- Timeline of Billboard number-one dance songs
