= Rob Dougan =

Australian composer

- Also known as: Rob D The OT Quartet; Dignity; Rollo & Rob D
- Born: Robert Don Hunter Dougan; 1969 (age 56–57); Melbourne, Victoria, Australia
- Genres: Trip hop, electronica, neoclassical
- Occupations: Songwriter, composer, producer, mixer, remixer
- Years active: 1991–present
- Labels: Sony, BMG, Reprise, Warner Bros.
- Website: http://www.robdougan.com/ https://subscribe.robdougan.com/

Robert Don Hunter Dougan (/ˈduːɡən/) is an Australian composer, known for his genre-blending music. Mixing elements of orchestral music, trip hop, and bluesy vocals, his work is tangentially relatable to electronic music. He is known primarily for his breakthrough 1995 single "Clubbed to Death (Kurayamino Variation)", further popularised by 1999's The Matrix soundtrack. "Clubbed to Death" was re-released on his debut album Furious Angels in 2002, seven years after its initial release, as well as providing several variations of the song, most notably the Kurayamino variation; he has also provided a variation of the Moby song "Porcelain". In 1995, he teamed up with Rollo Armstrong to remix the U2 song "Numb"; the remix was titled "Numb (Gimme Some More Dignity Mix)".

== Early life, family and education ==
Dougan was born in Melbourne, Australia in 1969 to Don and Margaret, one of six children. Raised in Sydney, he attended Saint Ignatius' College, Riverview then the National Institute of Dramatic Art, where he studied acting. In an interview, he recalled the only albums in the family home were of Beethoven, Louis Armstrong, Cleo Laine and Ennio Morricone.

== Career ==
From 1991 to 1995, Dougan was a producer and remix artist. In 1994, his remixes started charting in the United Kingdom. He also released his first single, "Hard Times".

In 1995, his hit single "Clubbed to Death" gave him a recognised name in the UK dance club scene. He produced half a dozen remixes of it, including the "Kurayamino Variation". His label Mo' Wax Records was pleased and commissioned the follow-up, "Clubbed to Death 2" (later the bonus track on the album). CTD2 was never released as a single, but appeared on the James Lavelle disc of the 1996 DJ mix compilation album, Cream Live 2. During this time, he contributed music to Impossible Princess, the studio album of fellow Australian, Kylie Minogue.

"Furious Angels" was not released on Mo' Wax, but Dougan eventually released it as a single in 1998 on Rollo's label Cheeky Records. Dougan worked for the following six years, doing remixes and licensing his tracks, in order to self-produce the album, which was backed by a full orchestra and a full choir. "Furious Angels" also featured as the musical score accompanying the introduction sequence for the 2000 racing simulation game Grand Prix 3.

In 1999, his exposure increased dramatically when his "Clubbed to Death (Kurayamino Variation)" was featured on the soundtrack of The Matrix. He contributed two more tracks to the soundtrack of 2003's The Matrix Reloaded, "Château" and "Kung Fu" (a shortened version of "Furious Angels" made for The Matrix Reloaded). Some of the orchestral material for these tracks was recorded at 20th Century Fox Newman Scoring Stage where Star Wars had been scored. "I'm Not Driving Anymore (instrumental)" was also used for the trailer of the film and as background music for the DVD menu. The song was also featured in the 2001 racing movie Driven with vocals. He credits this career breakthrough to support of American DJ Jason Bentley.

In 2002 in the UK, and 2003 in the rest of the world, Dougan released his debut album Furious Angels, which was met with "Generally favorable" reviews from critics. Later in 2003, a two-disc re-release of Furious Angels featured all-instrumental versions on the second disc.

In 2006, Dougan was reportedly writing "a couple of songs" for Sugababes (for whom he produced the single "Too Lost in You"), and working on two albums of his own — one original, one classical.

A short film made for jewelry designer Solange Azagury-Partridge, The Letter, directed by Laurence Dunmore and starring Thandiwe Newton and Jason Isaacs features new music by Rob Dougan; the short film, however, does not mention the title of the song.

In May 2015, Dougan released The 22nd Sunday in Ordinary Time Sessions on his official site. The EP, recorded at London's Air Lyndhurst Studios with a 84-piece orchestra and 50-voice choir, consists of five instrumental songs and a 20-minute film of the sessions.

In October 2016, Dougan released Misc. Sessions EP on his official site. The EP, recorded at Abbey Road Studios with a 10-piece and 50-piece string section, consists of five tracks, with orchestra and instrumental mixes and an 18-minute film.

In 2018 Dougan compiled and released Films: Past and Future his first solely instrumental release, comprising 21 tracks available for the first time on vinyl, CD and digital download. The album was released via direct-to-fan company PledgeMusic just at the time that the organisation announced it was experiencing issues and had failed to pay many artists the monies that had been pledged to them. In a personal project update posted on 18 February, Rob confirmed that he had been affected by the issues but, having already released the album digitally, had met the costs of physical releases himself, with the CD, vinyl and accompanying book due for release on 4 March 2019.

In February 2019, Dougan released The Life of the World to Come, a brand new four track EP which includes "The Life of the World to Come", "Beautiful Things", "Quasimodo's Dream" and "And Then I Think of You". Each song was released with an accompanying instrumental version and two of the tracks were cover versions - "Beautiful Things" written by Leslie Bricusse and "Quasimodo's Dream" by The Reels. The EP is published by Engard Ltd and was released by Dougan himself via Gumroad.

== Style ==
Dougan's vocal style has been compared to Tom Waits and Leonard Cohen, his composition approach to that of film score composers John Barry and Barry Adamson. He frequently uses orchestral elements in his music, notably Elgar's Enigma Variations in "Clubbed to Death (The First Mix)." Though placed in the camp of dance and techno, in an interview with the Guardian early in his career, Dougan distanced himself from the genre, identifying more strongly with Classical music:

"I'm associated with dance music, with electronica, which makes me feel ill. I only learnt all the boring computer crap as a means to an end. Virtually all musicians these days use computers, but if you write a book on a computer, nobody calls it electronic writing... I know it's not a fashionable attitude, but there is a musical hierarchy, and writing a song is not the same as writing a symphony. Classical music is a lot harder to do: it's richer, and it will leave you with more."

Rob Dougan "Will You Follow Me" (2002)
23-second clip of "Will You Follow Me". This song was used on (jewellery and car) commercials in the USA. Dougan's Modern Classical style is prominently featured.

== Non-musical activities ==
In 2004, Dougan founded a vineyard called La Pèira in the Terrasses du Larzac region of France.

== Discography ==
=== Studio albums ===
List of studio albums, with selected chart positions
Title	Album details	Peak chart positions
Title	Album details	AUS
Furious Angels	Released: July 2002^{[A]}; Label: Cheeky Records, BMG; Formats: CD, digital download, LP	174

=== Compilation albums ===
List of albums, with selected details
Title	Release details
Films: Past and Future - An Instrumental Anthology	Released: 9 December 2018; Formats: CD, digital download, LP
The Opening Trilogy	Released: 2019; Formats: CD, digital download, LP

=== Extended plays ===
List of albums, with selected details
Title	Release details
The 22nd Sunday in Ordinary Time Sessions	Released: 9 May 2015; Formats: Digital download
Misc. Sessions	Released: 23 October 2016; Formats: Digital download
The Life of the World to Come	Released: 21 February 2019; Formats: Digital download

=== Singles ===
List of singles, with selected chart positions, showing year released and album name
Title	Year	Peak chart positions			Album
Title	Year	AUS	IRE	UK	Album
"Hard Times"	1995	—	—	—	Non-album single
"Clubbed to Death"^{[B]}	1995	92	27	24	The Matrix: Music from the Motion Picture and Furious Angels
"Furious Angels"	1998	125	45	42	The Matrix Reloaded: The Album and Furious Angels
"—" denotes a title that did not chart, or was not released in that territory.

=== Miscellaneous ===
List of miscellaneous, with selected details
Title	Release details
Clubbed to Death 2	Released: 1999; Formats: 12″
Rehearsals (Dec 2018)	Released: 2018; Formats: CD-R, digital download

=== Notes ===
- A Furious Angels was not released in the United States until May 2003, where it was released on the record labels Warner Bros. Records and Reprise Records.
- B "Clubbed to Death" only charted in the UK and Ireland after being re-released in 2002.

== See also ==
- The Matrix (franchise)
- The Matrix
- The Matrix Reloaded
- The Matrix Revolutions
