= Gumroad =

Digital marketplace platform

- Industry: Digital distribution, self-publishing, e-commerce.
- Founded: 2011; 15 years ago
- Founder: Sahil Lavingia, Sachin Khanna
- Headquarters: San Francisco, California, U.S.
- Area served: Worldwide
- Key people: Ershad Kunnakkadan (CEO)
- Website: gumroad.com

Gumroad, Inc. is an American online marketplace platform that allows creators to sell products directly to their audience. It was founded by Sahil Lavingia in 2011 and is based in San Francisco, California.

== History ==
Gumroad was founded in 2011 by Sahil Lavingia, who was previously a designer at Pinterest and Turntable.fm. The idea for the platform came to Lavingia when he wanted to sell an icon he had designed and saw that the amount of effort it took to sell an item directly to consumers was considerable. In February 2012, Gumroad announced a $1.1 million seed round. Three months later Kleiner Perkins Caufield & Byers (KPCB) led a $7 million Series A round.

On September 8, 2014, Twitter launched a Buy Now button in partnership with Gumroad, the Buy Now and Gumroad partnership was discontinued on January 7, 2017. On September 30, 2014, Gumroad released an iPhone app.

In March 2021, Gumroad raised $5 million through an equity crowdfunding campaign after the U.S. Securities and Exchange Commission increased the maximum amount companies could raise through crowdfunding from $1.07 million to $5 million. The company also raised an additional $1 million from investors Naval Ravikant, co-founder of AngelList and Jason Fried, co-founder and CEO of Basecamp.

In March 2024, Gumroad banned the sale of sexually explicit content on its platform due to pressure from Stripe and PayPal.

== See also ==
- Digital distribution
- Online marketplace
- Online marketplaces available in the United States
- Online shopping
