= Dance Club Songs =

Billboard chart

The Dance Club Songs (also known as National Disco Action, Hot Dance/Disco Club Play and Hot Dance Club Play among others (Note: The published chart names were: National Disco Action Top 30, from August 28 to September 4, 1976; National Disco Action Top 40, from September 11, 1976 to March 31, 1979; National Disco Action with 60 positions, on April 7, 1979; Disco Top 80, from April 14, 1979, to September 1, 1979; Disco Top 100, from September 8, 1979, to July 25, 1981; Disco Top 80, from August 1, 1981, to March 20, 1982; Dance/Disco Top 80, from March 27, 1982, to October 13, 1984; Hot Dance/Disco with 80 positions, from October 20, 1984, to March 9, 1985; Hot Dance/Disco: Club Play with 50 positions, from March 16, 1985, to September 12, 1987; Hot Dance: Club Play with 50 positions, from September 19 to October 3, 1987; Hot Dance 50: Club Play from October 10 to October 17, 1987; Hot Dance Music: Club Play with 50 positions, from October 24, 1987 to October 18, 2003; Hot Dance Club Play with 50 positions, from October 25, 2003, to June 13, 2009; Hot Dance Club Songs with 50 positions, from June 20, 2009, to December 4, 2010; Dance Club Songs with 50 positions, from December 11, 2010, to March 28, 2020)) was a chart published weekly between 1976 and 2020 by Billboard magazine. It used club disc jockeys set lists to determine the most popular songs being played in nightclubs across the United States.

== History ==
The Dance Club Songs chart underwent several incarnations since its inception in 1974. Originally a top-10 list of tracks that garnered the largest audience response within nightclubs in New York City, the chart began on October 26, 1974 under the title Disco Action and was curated by disco music producer and remixer Tom Moulton. The chart went on to feature playlists from various cities around the country from week to week. Billboard continued to run regional and city-specific charts throughout 1975 and 1976 until the issue dated August 28, 1976, when a 30-position National Disco Action Top 30 premiered. The first number-one song on the chart for the issue dated August 28, 1976, was "You Should Be Dancing" by the Bee Gees, spending five weeks atop the chart and the group's only number-one song on the chart.

The chart would continue to be published continuously for over 40 years, but with changes in the number of chart positions and in the chart title, with disco, dance and/or club in the chart name. The chart soon expanded to 40 positions, then in 1979 the chart expanded to 60 positions, then 80, and eventually the chart reached 100 positions from September 1979 until 1981, when the chart was reduced back to 80. During the first half of the 1980s, the chart maintained 80 slots until March 16, 1985, when the Disco charts were splintered and renamed. Two charts appeared: Hot Dance/Disco: Club Play, which ranked club play (at 50 positions), and Hot Dance Music: Maxi-Singles Sales, which ranked 12-inch single (or maxi-single) sales (also 50 positions, later reduced to 10 and discontinued in 2013, since replaced by Dance/Electronic Digital Songs).

On January 26, 2013, Billboard introduced the Hot Dance/Electronic Songs chart, which tracks the 50 most popular dance and electronic songs as determined by Billboard based on digital single sales, streaming, radio airplay across all formats, and club play, with Dance Club Songs serving as the club play component to the multi-metric chart.

On March 31, 2020, due to the COVID-19 pandemic, which caused the closures of clubs, Billboard suspended the chart. The last number-one song, for the issue dated March 28, 2020, was "Love Hangover 2020" by Diana Ross. Even after the pandemic receded and club attendance increased again, Billboard did not revive the chart nor publish any information about a possible revival, effectively ending the nearly 44-year run of the chart.

== Statistics and Record World data ==
Although the disco chart began reporting popular songs in New York City nightclubs, Billboard soon expanded coverage to feature multiple charts each week which highlighted playlists in various cities such as San Francisco, San Diego, Boston, Los Angeles, Chicago, Miami, Phoenix, Detroit, and Houston. During this time, Billboard rival publication Record World was the first to compile a dance chart which incorporated club play on a national level. Noted Billboard statistician Joel Whitburn later "adopted" Record World′s chart data from the weeks between March 29, 1975, and August 21, 1976, into Billboard′s club play history. For the sake of continuity, Record World′s national chart is incorporated into both Whitburn's Dance/Disco publication (via his Record Research company) as well as the 1975 and 1976 number-ones lists.

With the issue dated August 28, 1976, Billboard premiered its own national chart, the National Disco Action Top 30, and their data is used from this date forward.

In January 2017, Billboard proclaimed Madonna as the most successful artist in the history of the chart, ranking her first in their list of the 100 top all-time dance artists. Madonna holds the record for the most number-one songs with 50. Katy Perry holds the record for having 18 consecutive number-one songs. Perry's third studio album, Teenage Dream (2010), became the first album in the history of the chart to produce at least seven number-one songs by a lead artist. (Note: Kristine W's The Power of Music was the first album to produce seven number-one songs, from 2009–2011, but she was not the lead on one of the songs, "Walk Away", which was credited to Tony Moran featuring Kristine W.) It held this record until Rihanna's eighth studio album Anti produced eight chart-toppers from 2016 to 2017. Rihanna is the only artist to have achieved five number-one songs in a calendar year.

== Artist achievements ==
=== Top 10 artists of all-time (1976–2016) ===
Rank	Artist name	Ref.
1	Madonna	
2	Janet Jackson	
3	Rihanna	
4	Beyoncé	
5	Pet Shop Boys	
6	Donna Summer	
7	Mariah Carey	
8	Kristine W	
9	Jennifer Lopez	
10	Depeche Mode	

=== Most number ones ===
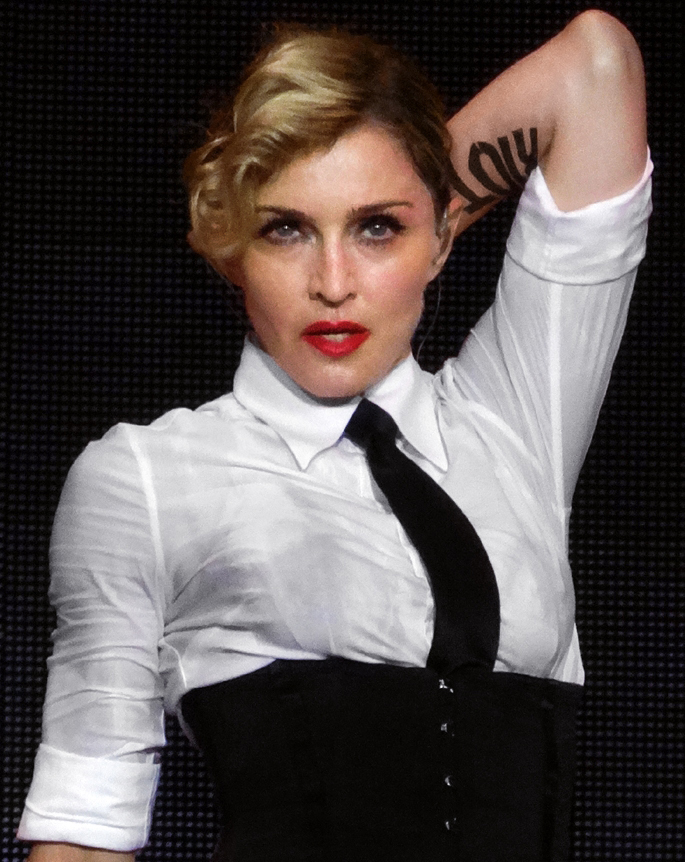
Madonna holds the record for the most number-ones since its inception with 50, and as of 2020 is the only living and active artist to have charted continuously since 1982. "Holiday"/"Lucky Star" (1983) marked her first number-one on the chart, with "I Don't Search I Find" (2020) being her most recent.

Fifteen number-ones or more
Position	Artist name	Tally of number-ones
1	Madonna	50
2	Rihanna	33
3	Beyoncé	22
4	Janet Jackson	20
5	Katy Perry	19
6	Jennifer Lopez	18
7	Mariah Carey	17
7	Kristine W	17
9	Donna Summer	16^{1}
10	Lady Gaga	15

=== Most consecutive number-ones ===
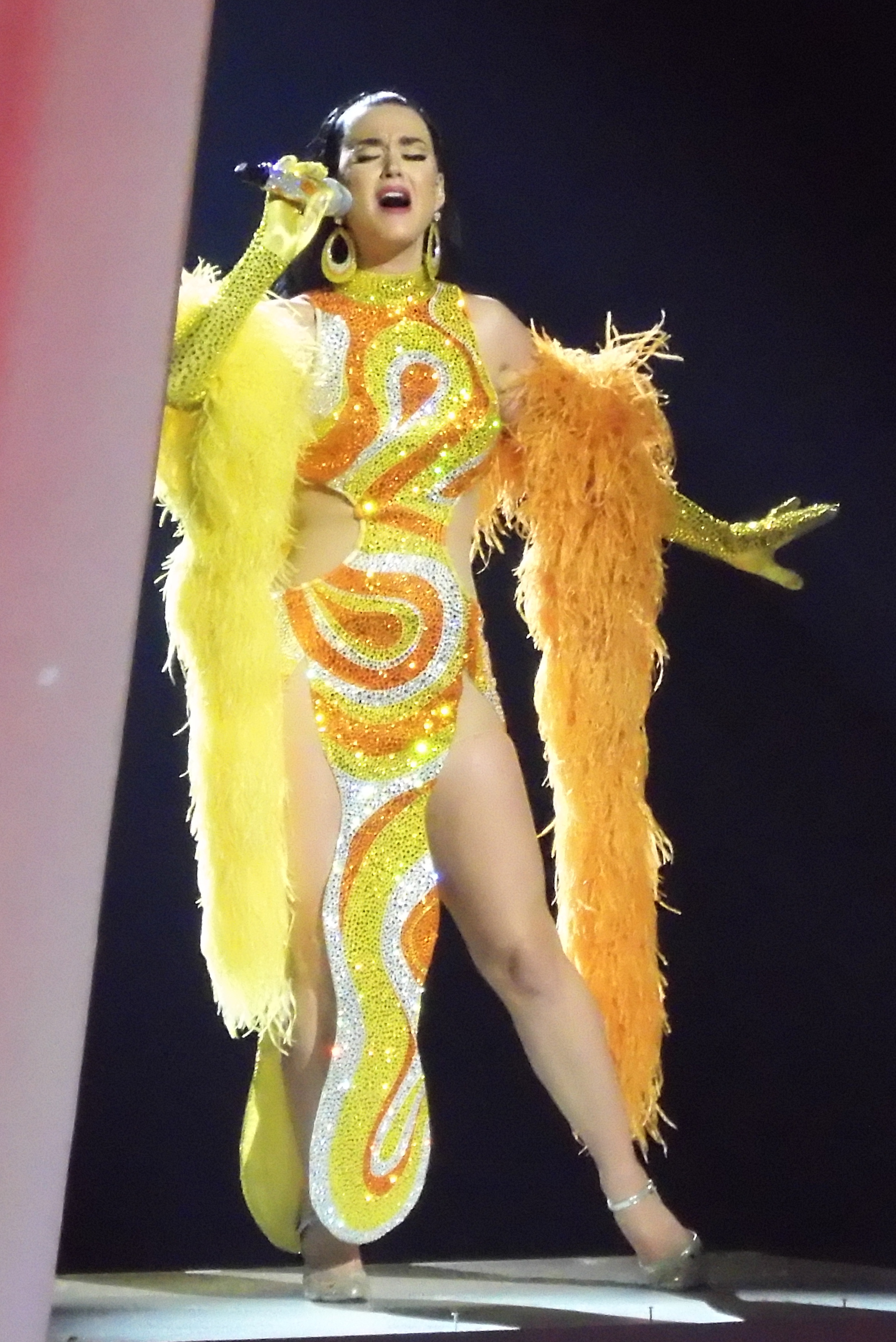
Katy Perry holds the record for the most consecutive number-ones.

Number of songs	Artist name	First hit and date	Last hit and date	Streak breaking song and date
18	Katy Perry	"Waking Up in Vegas" (August 22, 2009)	"Swish Swish" (featuring Nicki Minaj) (July 22, 2017)	"Bon Appétit" (featuring Migos) (#28, April 18, 2017)
11	Jennifer Lopez	"Qué Hiciste" (June 23, 2007)	"Live It Up" (featuring Pitbull) (July 20, 2013)	"I Luh Ya Papi" (featuring French Montana) (#5, June 28, 2014)
9	Kristine W	"Feel What You Want" (July 23, 1994)	"The Wonder of It All" (January 2, 2005)	"I'll Be Your Light" (#2, February 26, 2006)
9	Beyoncé	"Diva" (March 28, 2009)	"Countdown" (December 24, 2011)	"End of Time" (#33, March 3, 2012)
9	Erika Jayne	"Rollercoaster" (July 28, 2007)	"How Many Fucks" (August 13, 2016)	Non-breaking streak
8	Kylie Minogue	"All The Lovers" (August 14, 2010)	"Into The Blue" (April 12, 2014)	"I Was Gonna Cancel" (#5, August 9, 2014)
7	Janet Jackson	"When I Think of You" (September 20, 1986)	"Alright" (May 5, 1990)	"Black Cat" (#17, October 27, 1990)
7	Madonna	"Causing a Commotion" (October 31, 1987)	"Justify My Love" (January 19, 1991)	"Rescue Me" (#6, March 16, 1991)
7	Madonna	"Nothing Really Matters" (March 13, 1999)	"Impressive Instant" (November 17, 2001)	"GHV2 Megamix" (#5, December 2, 2001)

=== Most number-ones in a calendar year ===
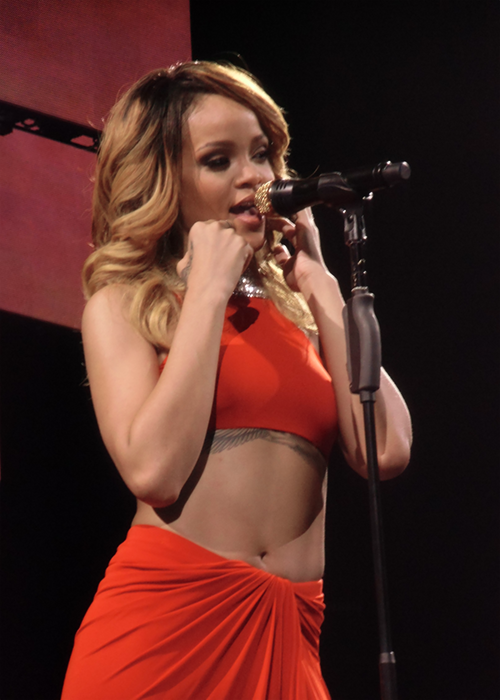
Rihanna is the only act to have achieved five number-one songs in a calendar year, and is one of only four acts to have attained at least four.

Number of songs	Artist name	Year charted	Name of songs	Ref.
5	Rihanna	2017	"Love on the Brain", "Sex with Me", "Pose", "Wild Thoughts" (DJ Khaled featuring Rihanna and Bryson Tiller), "Desperado"	
4	Rihanna	2007	"We Ride", "Umbrella" (featuring Jay-Z), "Don't Stop the Music", "Shut Up and Drive"	
4	Rihanna	2010	"Russian Roulette", "Hard" (featuring Jeezy), "Rude Boy", "Only Girl (In the World)"	
4	Rihanna	2011	"Who's That Chick?" (David Guetta featuring Rihanna), "S&M", "California King Bed", "We Found Love" (featuring Calvin Harris)	
4	Rihanna	2016	"Work" (featuring Drake), "This Is What You Came For" (Calvin Harris featuring Rihanna), "Kiss It Better", "Needed Me"	
4	Beyoncé	2009	"Single Ladies (Put a Ring on It)", "Diva", "Halo", "Sweet Dreams"	
4	Lady Gaga	2009	"Poker Face", "LoveGame", "Paparazzi", "Bad Romance"	
4	Lady Gaga	2011	"Born This Way", "Judas", "The Edge of Glory", "You and I"	
4	Katy Perry	2014	"Unconditionally", "Dark Horse" (featuring Juicy J), "Birthday", "This Is How We Do"	

=== Quickest collection of first 10 number-ones ===
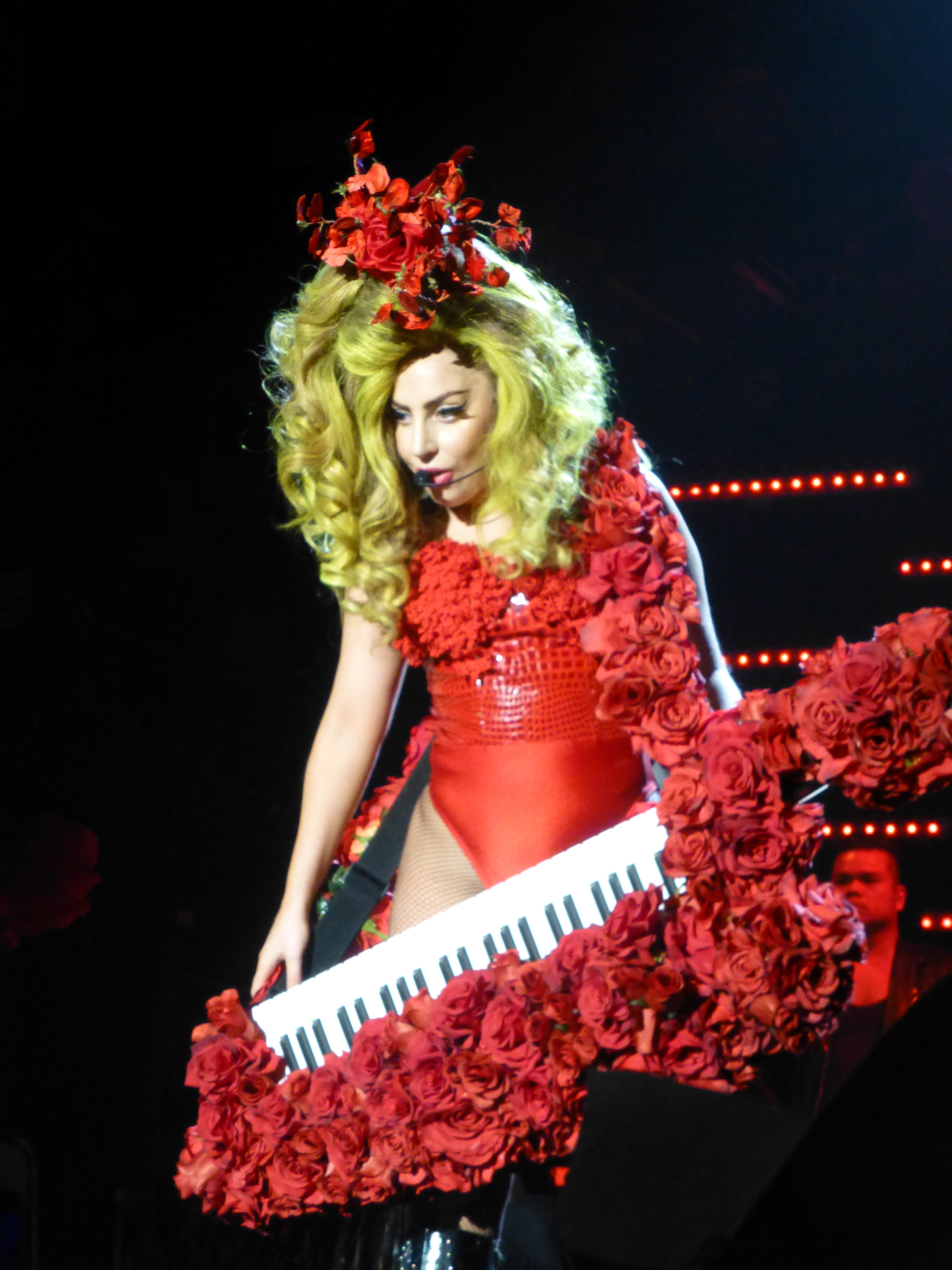
Lady Gaga holds the record for collecting 10 number-ones in the shortest time frame at two years, five months and three weeks.

Artist	Songs	Time span	Ref.
Lady Gaga	"Poker Face" (first, February 21, 2009) "LoveGame" "Paparazzi" "Bad Romance" "Telephone", featuring Beyoncé "Video Phone", Beyoncé featuring Lady Gaga "Alejandro" "Born This Way" "Judas" "The Edge of Glory" (tenth, August 4, 2011)	Two years, five months	
Katy Perry	"Waking Up in Vegas" (first, August 22, 2009) "California Gurls", featuring Snoop Dogg "Teenage Dream" "Peacock" "Firework" "E.T." "Last Friday Night (T.G.I.F.)" "The One That Got Away" "Part of Me" "Wide Awake" (tenth, August 4, 2012)	Two years, eleven months	
Rihanna	"Pon de Replay" (first, October 8, 2005) "SOS" "Unfaithful" "We Ride" "Umbrella", featuring Jay-Z "Don't Stop the Music" "Shut Up and Drive" "Disturbia" "Russian Roulette" "Hard" featuring Jeezy (tenth, March 6, 2010)	Four years, five months	
Madonna	"Holiday/Lucky Star" (first, September 24, 1983) "Like a Virgin" "Material Girl" "Angel/Into the Groove" "Open Your Heart" "Causing a Commotion"; You Can Dance (LP Cuts) "Like a Prayer" "Express Yourself" "Keep It Together" (tenth, March 31, 1990)	Six years, six months	

== Song achievements ==
=== Most weeks at number one ===
Number of weeks	Artist(s)	Song(s)	Year(s)
11	Michael Jackson	Thriller (all cuts)	1983
9	Change	"A Lover's Holiday"/"The Glow Of Love"/"Searching"	1980
8	Chic	"Dance, Dance, Dance (Yowsah, Yowsah, Yowsah)"/"Everybody Dance"/"You Can Get By"	1977
7	Village People	Village People (all cuts)	1977
7	T-Connection	"Do What You Wanna Do"	1977
7	Chic	"Le Freak"/"I Want Your Love"/"Chic Cheer"	1978-79
7	Donna Summer	"Hot Stuff"/"Bad Girls"	1979
7	Geraldine Hunt	"Can't Fake the Feeling"	1980
7	Chaz Jankel	"Glad to Know You"/"3,000,000 Synths"/"Ai No Corrida"	1982

=== Shortest climbs to number one ===
Number of weeks	Artist(s)	Song	Year(s)
3	Prince	"When Doves Cry"/"17 Days"	1984
3	ABC	"Be Near Me"	1985
3	Colonel Abrams	"I'm Not Gonna Let (You Get The Best Of Me)"	1986
4	T-Connection	"Do What You Wanna Do"	1977
4	The Trammps	"Disco Inferno"/"Starvin'"/"Body Contact Contract"	1977
4	Daryl Hall & John Oates	"Say It Isn't So"	1983
4	Deniece Williams	"Let's Hear It for the Boy"	1984
4	Madonna	"Like A Virgin"	1984
4	Aretha Franklin	"Freeway Of Love"	1985
4	The Human League	"Human"	1986
4	Company B	"Fascinated"	1987
4	Michael Jackson	"Bad"	1987
4	Madonna	"Like A Prayer"	1989
4	Janet Jackson	"Miss You Much"	1989
4	Black Box featuring Martha Wash	"Everybody Everybody"	1990
4	C+C Music Factory featuring Freedom Williams and Martha Wash	"Gonna Make You Sweat (Everybody Dance Now)"	1990
4	Madonna	"Erotica"	1992
4	Michael Jackson and Janet Jackson	"Scream"	1995
4	Mariah Carey	"Honey"	1997
4	Madonna	"Beautiful Stranger"	1999
4	Madonna	"Music"	2000
4	Madonna	"Impressive Instant"	2001
4	Madonna	"Hung Up"	2005
4	The Pussycat Dolls featuring Busta Rhymes	"Don't Cha"	2005
4	Beyoncé & Shakira	"Beautiful Liar"	2007
4	Madonna featuring Justin Timberlake & Timbaland	"4 Minutes"	2008
4	Lady Gaga	"Bad Romance"	2010

=== Longest climbs to number one ===
- 19th week — "Wordy Rappinghood"/"Genius of Love" by Tom Tom Club
- 19th week — "Walking on a Dream" by Empire of the Sun
- 17th week — "Losing It" by Fisher
- 16th week — "The Look of Love" by ABC
- 16th week — "Most Precious Love" by Blaze presents U.D.A.U.F.L. featuring Barbara Tucker
- 16th week — "Where Have You Been" by Rihanna
- 16th week — "Right Now" by Rihanna featuring David Guetta

=== Biggest jump to number one ===
- (27–1) Thriller (all cuts) by Michael Jackson

=== Number-one songs covered by different artists ===
- "The Boss" — Diana Ross (1979), The Braxtons (1997), Kristine W (2008), and again Diana Ross (2019).
- "You Make Me Feel (Mighty Real)" — Sylvester (1978) and Byron Stingily (1998)
- "Back to Life" — Soul II Soul (1989) and Hilary Roberts (2019).
- "Keep on Jumpin'" — Musique (1978) and Todd Terry with Martha Wash & Jocelyn Brown (1996)

== Album achievements ==
=== Most number-one songs from one album ===
Five number-ones or more
Artist name	Album	Number-ones	Titles of songs	Ref.
Rihanna	Anti	8	"Work" (featuring Drake) "Kiss It Better" "Needed Me" "Love on the Brain" "Sex with Me" "Pose" "Desperado" "Consideration" (featuring SZA)	
Kristine W	The Power of Music	7	"Walk Away" (Tony Moran featuring Kristine W) "The Boss" "Never" "Love Is the Look" "Be Alright" "The Power of Music" "Fade"	
Katy Perry	Teenage Dream	7	"California Gurls" (featuring Snoop Dogg) "Teenage Dream" "Peacock" "Firework" "E.T." "Last Friday Night (T.G.I.F.)" "The One That Got Away"	
Beyoncé	I Am... Sasha Fierce	6	"Single Ladies (Put a Ring on It)" "Diva" "Halo" "Sweet Dreams" "Why Don't You Love Me" "Video Phone"	
Dua Lipa	Dua Lipa: Complete Edition	6	"Be the One" "Blow Your Mind (Mwah)" "IDGAF" "New Rules" "One Kiss" "Electricity"	
Madonna	Music	5	"American Pie" "Music" "Don't Tell Me" "What It Feels Like for a Girl" "Impressive Instant"	
Madonna	American Life	5	"Die Another Day" "American Life" "Hollywood" "Nothing Fails" "Love Profusion"	
Lady Gaga	Born This Way	5	"Born This Way" "Judas" "The Edge of Glory" "Yoü and I" "Marry the Night"	
Katy Perry	Prism	5	"Roar" "Unconditionally" "Dark Horse" (featuring Juicy J) "Birthday" "This Is How We Do"	

== Records and other achievements ==
- Madonna holds the record for the most chart hits, the most top-twenty hits, the most top-ten hits and the most total weeks at number one (75 weeks).
- Enrique Iglesias, Dave Audé, Pitbull, and David Guetta are tied with 14 number-ones on the chart, the most among male artists.
- Rihanna became the first artist to earn 4 number-ones on the chart in a year (2007), a feat she repeated a record 3 additional times before becoming the first act to earn 5 number-ones in a year (2017) as well.
- Madonna scored three number-ones in a single year seven times (1985, 2001, 2003, 2006, 2012, 2015, 2019), making her the first and most act to do so.
- Kylie Minogue became the first act to have two songs in the top three on March 5, 2011. Her song "Better than Today" was number-one while "Higher", a song by Taio Cruz on which Minogue features, was number three. On July 28, 2016, Rihanna became the second act to achieve this when her songs "Kiss It Better" and "Needed Me" were number one and three concurrently, however it made her the first act to have two songs in the top three as the lead act on both. David Guetta was the third to earn this distinction during the chart week of November 24, 2018, when "(It Happens) Sometimes", under his alias Jack Back, was number two, while his "Don't Leave Me Alone" collaboration with Anne-Marie was number three.
- Madonna was the first artist in the chart's history to have 2 studio albums with 5 number-one songs each topping the chart, respectively; from her eighth studio album Music and her ninth studio album American Life; Katy Perry has since surpassed this record, achieving 7 number-ones from her third studio album Teenage Dream, and 5 number-ones from her fourth, Prism.
- The first 12-inch single made commercially available to the public was "Ten Percent" by Double Exposure in 1976.
- The first number one on Billboard's Disco Action chart was "Never Can Say Goodbye" by Gloria Gaynor in 1974.
- The first number one on Billboard's National Disco Action Top 30 was "You Should Be Dancing" by the Bee Gees in 1976.
- Madonna is the first act ever to score as many as 50 No. 1s on any single Billboard chart, extending her record over George Strait, who has earned 44 leaders on Hot Country Songs.
- From the dance chart's inception until the week of February 16, 1991, several (or even all) songs on an EP, album or 12-inch single could occupy the same position if more than one track from a release was receiving significant play in clubs (for example, Donna Summer charted several full-length albums, both Chaka Khan and Madonna have hit number one with remix albums). Chart entries like this were especially prevalent during the disco era, where an entire side of an album would contain several songs segued together seamlessly to replicate a night of dancing in a club. Beginning with the February 23, 1991 issue, the dance chart became "song specific", meaning only one song could occupy each position at a time.
- Because of the former policy allowing multiple songs to occupy one position at the same time, there have been three instances when not only multiple songs were at number one, but the songs were performed by different artists. In all scenarios this was due to the tracks being included in film soundtrack albums. In 1978, four tracks from Thank God It's Friday (Donna Summer, Pattie Brooks, Love & Kisses, Sunshine); in 1980, three tracks from Fame (two by Irene Cara and one by Linda Clifford); and in 1985, two songs from Beverly Hills Cop (Patti LaBelle, Harold Faltermeyer) hit number one together.
- Madonna is recognized as the first act to have scored at least one No. 1 on the Dance Club Songs chart in five separate decades since the chart's inception in 1976, having tallied 9 in the 1980s, 13 in the '90s, 18 in the 2000s, 9 in the '10s and, now, one (so far) in the '20s. However, Martha Wash achieved this in 2015, having 1 in the 1970s; "Dance (Disco Heat)" with Sylvester (1978), 1 in the 1980s; "It's Raining Men" with The Weather Girls (1982), 7 in the 1990s, 1 in the 2000s, and 1 in the '10s.
- The Trammps are the only act to replace themselves at number one (issue date June 5, 1976, "That's Where the Happy People Go" → "Disco Party").
- The longest running number-ones on the Hot Dance Club Songs chart are "Bad Luck" by Harold Melvin & the Blue Notes^{2} in 1975 and the album Thriller by Michael Jackson. Both entries spent eleven weeks in the top spot.
- "One Word" by Kelly Osbourne made chart history on June 18, 2005, when it became the first song to simultaneously top the Hot Dance Club Songs, Hot Dance Singles Sales and Hot Dance Airplay charts.
- LeAnn Rimes became the first country music artist to have topped both the Billboard country chart and the Hot Dance Club Songs chart. Rimes, who had several remixes of her country hits reach the dance chart, achieved that distinction during the week of February 28, 2009, when the electronic dance music remixes of her 2008 single "What I Cannot Change" reached number one. Rimes has gone on to place two additional songs atop the dance charts, "Long Live Long" and "Love is Love is Love," both from her 2016 album, "Remnants."
- Olivia Newton-John and Chloe Lattanzi's collaboration with Dave Audé, "You Have to Believe", which reached number one in its November 21, 2015 issue, made history for Newton-John and Lattanzi, as they became the first mother-daughter duo to reach number one on this chart as well as picking up their first number ones at Dance Club Songs as well, although Newton-John had charted four times prior to this.
- Sting has the distinction of being the only artist to reach number one twice on this chart with a song he recorded and re-recorded, as his original version of "Stolen Car (Take Me Dancing)" featuring Twista reached that position in 2004, and again in 2016 as a featured duet with Mylène Farmer for "Stolen Car". In both cases, they were also remixed by Dave Audé, which is another first on this chart that a remixer reached number one with a song he remixed twice.

Footnotes

^{1} Summer's total would be 18 if including two titles that hit number one during the span of time in which Record World's dance chart data is used (see "Statistics and Record World data"). Billboard credits Summer with only 16 number-ones.
^{2} Eight of the 11 weeks-at-number-one for "Bad Luck" is during the span of time in which Record World's dance chart data is used (see "Statistics and Record World data").

== See also ==
- List of Billboard number-one dance club songs
- List of artists who reached number one on the U.S. Dance Club Songs chart
- Artists with the most number-ones on the U.S. Dance Club Songs chart
- Dance Singles Sales
