= Artists with the most number-ones on the U.S. Dance Club Songs chart =

Singers who have the most #1 U.S. Dance songs

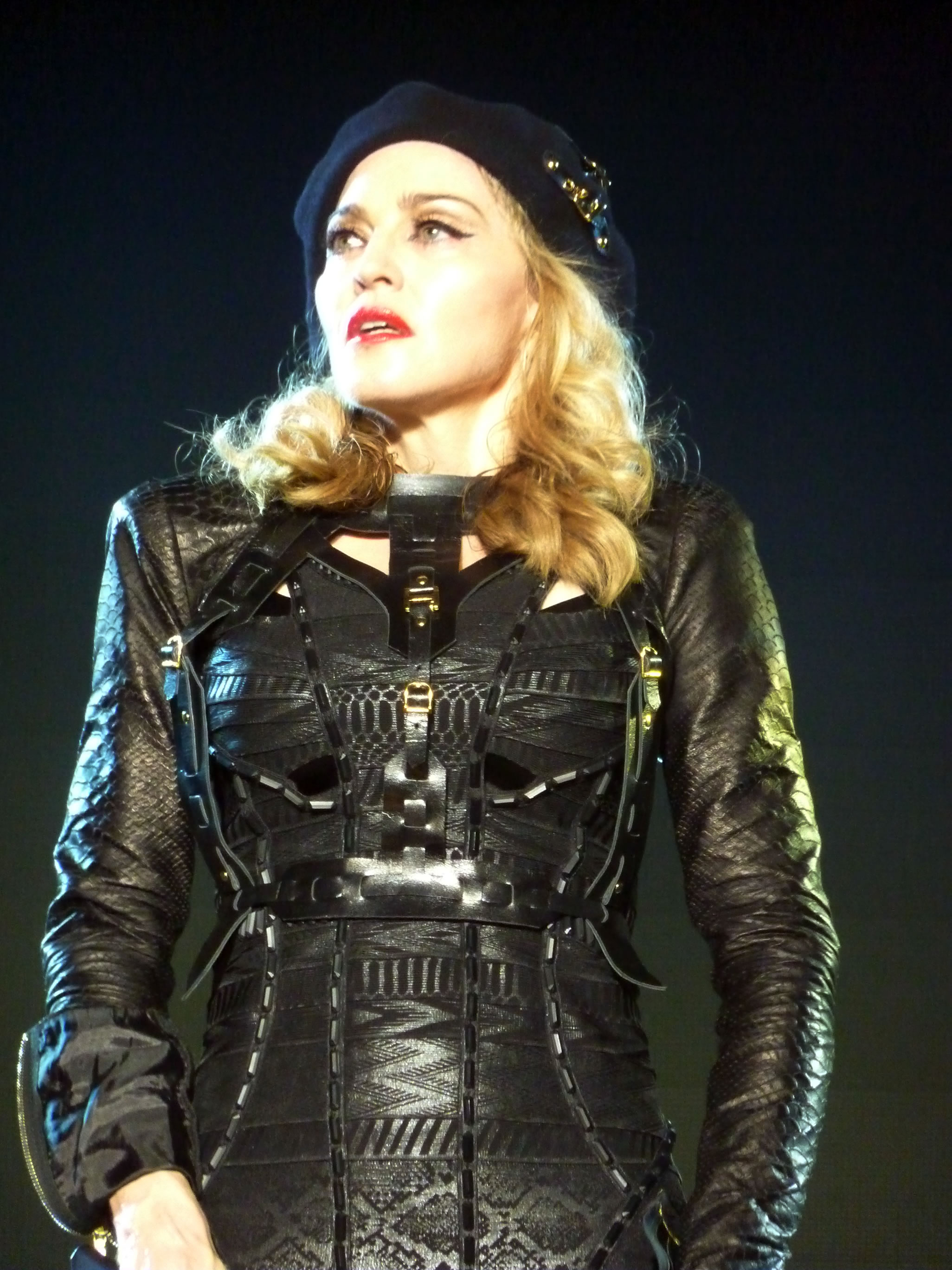
Madonna (pictured) has achieved more number ones on the U.S. Dance Club Songs chart than any other artist, with a record of 50. singles

This is a list of artists with the most number-ones on the U.S. Billboard Dance Club Songs chart. Madonna currently holds the record for the most number-one songs in the 43-year history of the chart, with 50. The only other artists to have achieved more than 20 chart toppers are Rihanna (33) and Beyoncé (22). Janet Jackson has accumulated 20 number-ones during her career, followed by Katy Perry with 19, and Jennifer Lopez with 18. Mariah Carey and Kristine W are tied with 17. Donna Summer has 16, Lady Gaga has 15, while Dave Audé, Enrique Iglesias, Pitbull, Kylie Minogue, David Guetta, and Whitney Houston have attained 14 apiece. Two acts have attained thirteen number-one songs: Deborah Cox and Yoko Ono (aka ONO).

== First: Madonna (50) ==
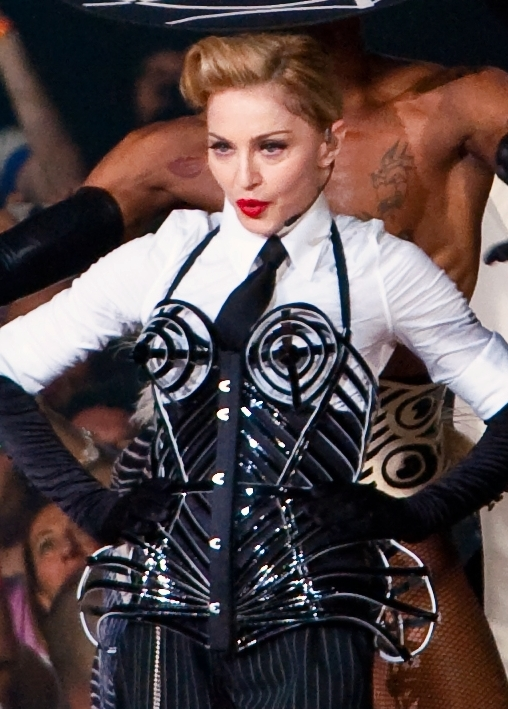
Madonna performing during The MDNA Tour in 2012.

American singer-songwriter and producer Madonna has achieved a record-extending 50 number-one songs on the U.S. Billboard Dance Club Songs chart. In addition to this feat, she also holds the record for the most chart hits, the most top-twenty hits, the most top-ten hits (her overall tally as of 2020 is 62 songs placed on this chart). and the most total weeks at number one. She is the only living and active artist to continue charting at Dance Club Songs (as of the March 28, 2020, issue), spanning 37 years, the longest of any artist on this chart. In its December 10, 2016, issue celebrating the 40th anniversary of the Dance Club Songs chart, Madonna ranked 1st among the top 100 all-time artists in this category. She also became the first Dance Club Songs artists in the history of the charts to have a single reach number one in five decades (1980s, 1990s, 2000s, 2010s, and 2020s).

Madonna's first two dance chart entries, "Everybody" in 1982 and "Burning Up" in 1983, both peaked at number three. Her first chart-topper came later in 1983, when the double-sided 12-inch single "Holiday"/"Lucky Star" spent five weeks at the summit. This remains as Madonna's longest-running number-one. Her second album Like a Virgin produced three chart-toppers during 1984–1985: "Like a Virgin", "Material Girl", and "Angel"/"Into the Groove". "Into the Groove", originally recorded for the film Desperately Seeking Susan, was later added to the Like a Virgin album when it was re-issued in non-American territories. "Open Your Heart", and "Causing a Commotion" were both number-ones in 1987. The remix album You Can Dance topped the club songs chart in 1988 (Billboard policy at the time allowed full albums or EPs to chart). Madonna closed out the 1980s with three more number-ones from her album Like a Prayer: The title track, "Express Yourself", and "Keep It Together" (in early 1990).

"Vogue" became Madonna's eleventh dance number-one in 1990, followed by "Justify My Love" in 1991. Her Erotica album produced three more chart-toppers ("Erotica", "Deeper and Deeper" and "Fever"). By the time the Bedtime Stories album spun off two more number-ones ("Secret" and "Bedtime Story"), Madonna had more number-ones than any other artist in the history of the chart. Dance remixes of "Don't Cry for Me Argentina", from the Evita soundtrack, gave Madonna her eighteenth number-one in 1997. In the late 1990s she continued to top the chart with "Frozen", "Ray of Light", "Nothing Really Matters", and "Beautiful Stranger". A cover version of Don McLean's "American Pie" hit number one in 2000.

Madonna's Music album became the first from the artist to produce four number-one dance hits: "Music", "Don't Tell Me", "What It Feels Like for a Girl", and "Impressive Instant". She bested this with her American Life album, with seven singles released during 2002–2004, five of which reached number one ("Die Another Day", "American Life", "Hollywood", "Nothing Fails", and "Love Profusion"). In the midst of this string, Madonna had another chart-topper — her only as a featured artist — on Britney Spears's "Me Against the Music" in 2003. She again produced four chart-toppers from an album, when "Hung Up", "Sorry", "Get Together", and "Jump" (from Confessions on a Dance Floor) became dance number-ones during 2005–2006. A collaboration with Justin Timberlake, "4 Minutes", became Madonna's thirty-eighth number-one in 2008, followed by "Give It 2 Me" (both from the Hard Candy album). A career retrospective, Celebration, gave her a record-extending 40th number-one ("Celebration").

Madonna's MDNA gave her three more number-one dance hits: "Give Me All Your Luvin'" (featuring Nicki Minaj and M.I.A.), "Girl Gone Wild", and "Turn Up the Radio". Madonna has collected three number-one songs from her thirteenth studio album, Rebel Heart. "Living for Love" became her forty-fourth number-one for the chart issue dated March 7, 2015. Billboard noted that it was a "historic" milestone, as Madonna tied with country singer George Strait for the most number-ones of any Billboard chart, who accumulated the same tally on the U.S. Hot Country Songs chart between 1982 and 2009. "Living for Love" also brought the singer's total amount of U.S. number-ones across all Billboard charts to 173, which includes multiple rankings. "Ghosttown" became her record-breaking forty-fifth chart topper for the issue dated May 30, 2015, breaking her tie with Strait and becoming the act with the most number-one hits on a singular Billboard chart. At the time, Madonna had garnered more number-ones on the chart than Rihanna and Beyoncé combined (45 total). It ascended to the peak with remixes by Don Diablo, Armand Van Helden, and Mindskap. "Bitch I'm Madonna" featuring Nicki Minaj became her record-extending forty-sixth chart topper in August 2015. It is Madonna's second collaboration with Minaj to reach the summit, following "Give Me All Your Luvin'" in 2012, and Minaj's fifth song in total to hit number one.

The singer's most recent number one entries are the four singles from her Madame X album: 2019's "Medellín", a collaboration with singer Maluma in June; "I Rise" in August; and "Crave" (featuring Rae Sremmurd member Swae Lee) in November; and February 2020 single "I Don't Search I Find". They extended her consecutive streak of number ones to ten, surpassing her two previous seven chart topping streaks (from 1987's "Causing a Commotion" to 1991's "Justify My Love", and from 1999's "Nothing Really Matters" to 2001's "Impressive Instant") That feat gave Madonna her ninth number one during the 2010s (2010-2019), and she has earned three number ones each from her last three studio albums, with each triple tallied in a single year.

== Second: Rihanna (33) ==
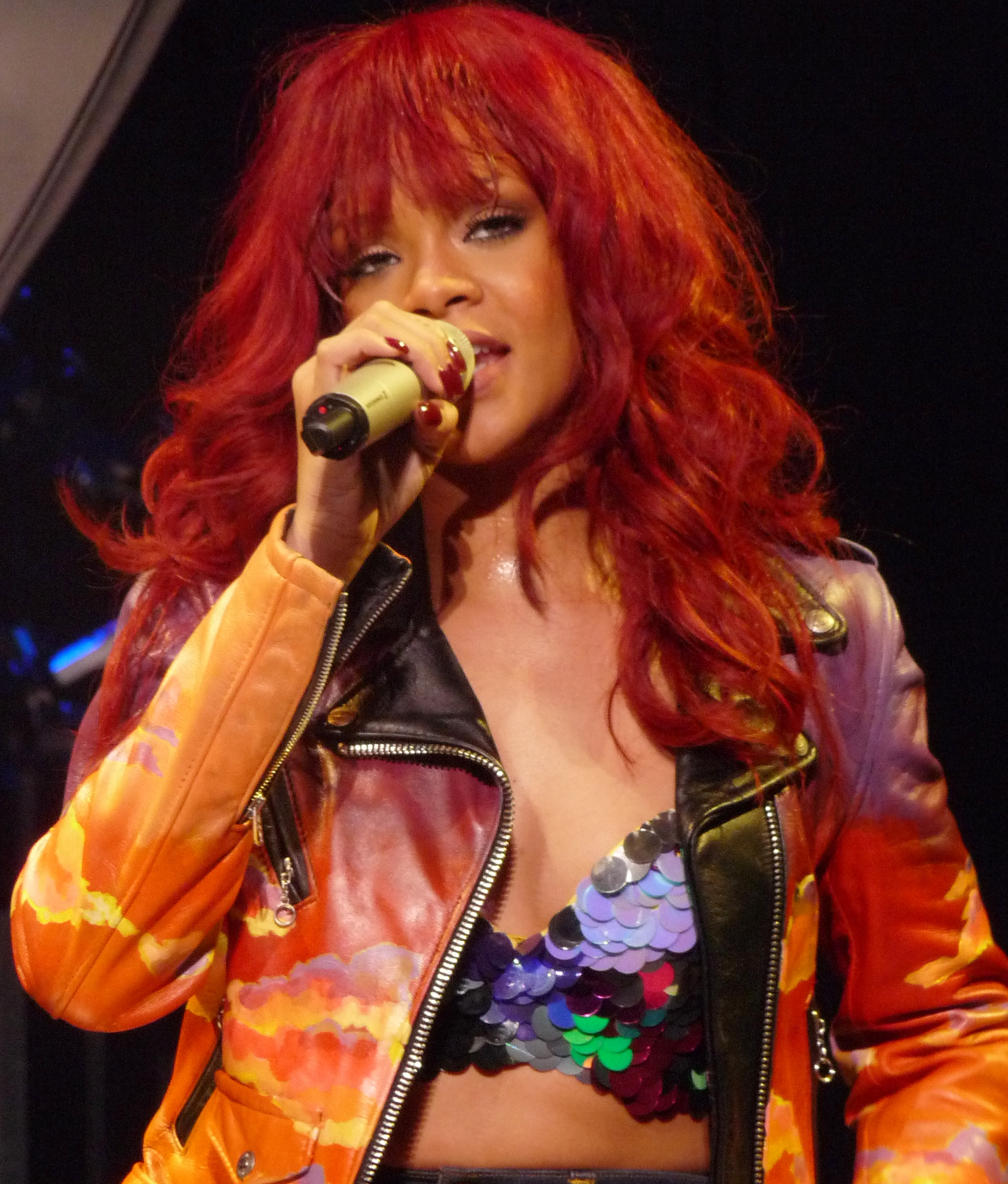
Rihanna performing during the Loud Tour in 2011

Barbadian singer-songwriter Rihanna has achieved 33 number-one songs on the U.S. Billboard Dance Club Songs chart. Rihanna's first number-one song was her debut single "Pon de Replay" in October 2005. It was followed by three number-ones from her second album A Girl like Me; "SOS" in May 2006, "Unfaithful" in July 2006, and "We Ride" in February 2007. Her third studio album, Good Girl Gone Bad spawned four number-ones; the lead single, "Umbrella" featuring Jay-Z, peaked atop the chart for two consecutive weeks, and was followed by "Don't Stop the Music", "Shut Up and Drive" and "Disturbia". Her fourth album, Rated R charted three number one songs: "Russian Roulette", "Hard" featuring Jeezy and "Rude Boy". With "Hard" reaching the top spot, Rihanna logged to shortest time span of reaching ten number-one songs, doing so in four years and five months. However, Lady Gaga broke this record in August 2011, achieving 10 in just two years, five months and three weeks.

Rihanna's fifth album, Loud, garnered three number-ones: "Only Girl (In the World)", "S&M" and "California King Bed". In between the release of "Only Girl (In the World)" and "S&M", "Who's That Chick?", a song by David Guetta on which Rihanna features, became her thirteenth chart topper in February 2011. Rihanna's sixth studio album, Talk That Talk, once again produced three number-one songs; "We Found Love" featuring Calvin Harris peaked atop the chart for two consecutive weeks, and "You da One" and "Where Have You Been" in February and June 2012, respectively. "Diamonds", the lead single from Rihanna's seventh studio album Unapologetic, gave the singer her nineteenth number-one song in December 2012, placing her in joint second place with Janet Jackson.

"Right Now", featuring Guetta, became Rihanna's twentieth number-one in August 2013, breaking her tie with Jackson and putting her alone in the position of second place. It also meant that the singer had collected twenty number one songs in less than eight years. "Right Now" reached the top spot in its sixteenth week on the chart, and ties for the longest climb to the peak position this century, matching "Where Have You Been" as well as "Most Precious Love" by Blaze presents U.D.A.U.F.L. featuring Barbara Tucker. "What Now" became her twenty-first chart-topper in November 2013. "Can't Remember to Forget You", a song by Shakira on which Rihanna features, became her twenty-second in total; it became only the second time whereby she was not the lead artist, the other being "Who's That Chick?". Rihanna's "Bitch Better Have My Money" became her twenty-third chart topper in June 2015.

In 2016 Rihanna released Anti. The album produced eight chart toppers chart — "Work" (featuring Drake), "Kiss It Better", "Needed Me", "Love on the Brain", "Sex with Me", "Pose", "Desperado" and "Consideration" — surpassing Katy Perry's Teenage Dream (2010) as the album with the most number-one songs on that chart. Between "Pon de Replay" and "Work", Rihanna had tallied more number-ones than any other artist, besting Beyoncé with 20, Katy Perry with 15 and Madonna with 13. Rihanna earned her twenty-fifth hit with Calvin Harris' song "This Is What You Came For" on which she features in July 2016. The second and third singles from Anti, "Kiss It Better" and "Needed Me", both topped the chart. Rihanna became the first lead act in the history of the chart to have two songs in the top three due to "Needed Me" charting at number three the same week.

"Needed Me" was her twenty-seventh number-one song; her fourth hit in 2016. The fourth single from Anti, "Love on the Brain", became her twenty-eighth number-one song in January 2017, while the non-single track "Sex with Me" became her twenty-ninth three months later. It is also the fifth song from Anti to reach number-one, making it the first album to produce as many since Katy Perry's album Prism throughout 2013–2014. Between "Work" and "Sex with Me" (April 2016-April 2017), Rihanna had achieved six number-one songs while no other artist had achieved more than two in the same time span. "Pose", another non-single track from Anti, topped the chart in July 2017, becoming her thirtieth in total and her sixth from Anti. The following month, in August 2017, "Wild Thoughts" which featured Rihanna topped the dance chart, making her the sole artist to have four number-ones in five calendar years. In January 2018, "Consideration" feat. SZA became the record eighth Anti song to hit number one, surpassing the previous record holder: Perry's Teenage Dream with seven.

== Third: Beyoncé (22) ==
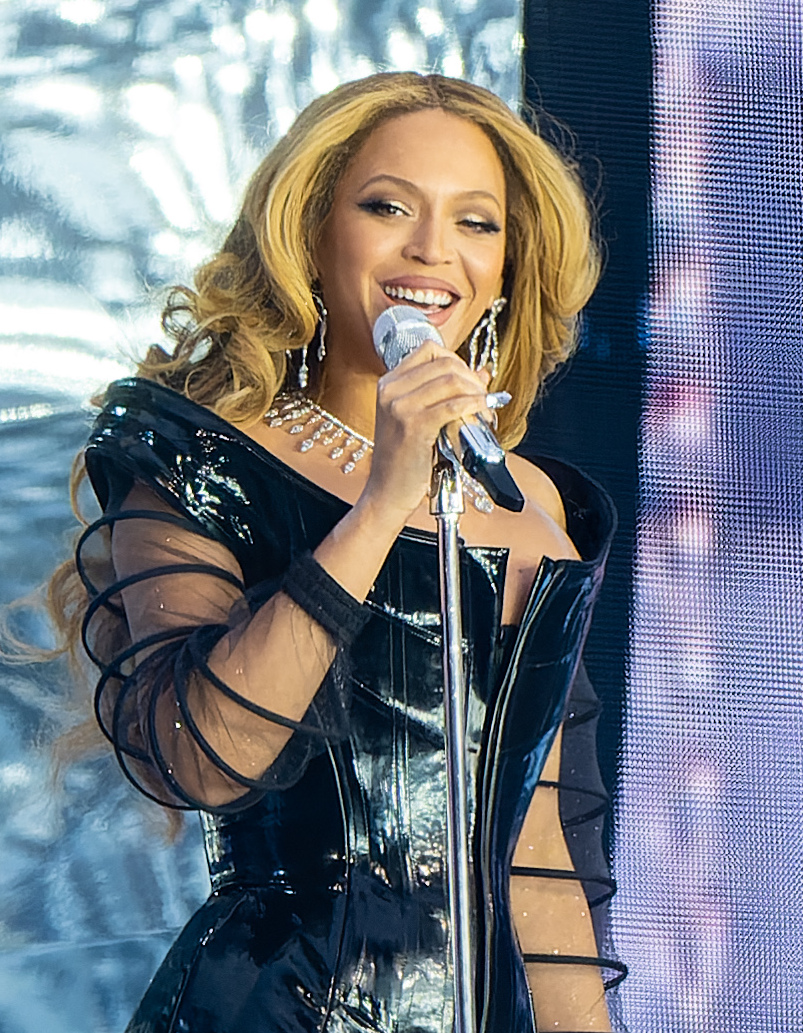
Beyoncé performing during the Renaissance World Tour in 2023.

American singer-songwriter and producer Beyoncé has achieved 22 number-one songs on the U.S. Billboard Dance Club Songs chart, and ranks 4th among the top 100 Dance Club Songs artists. Beyoncé claimed her first number one on the chart with her debut single "Crazy in Love" in September 2003, assisted by the Maurice Joshua and Junior Vasquez remixes. It was followed by the Calderone & Quayle remix of "Naughty Girl" in June 2004. In 2006, the singer claimed three number-ones on the chart: "Check on It" in March, the Freemasons and Joshua Maurice assisted remixes of "Déjà Vu" in October, and "Ring the Alarm" in December. In 2007, the singer achieved her sixth and seventh number ones, respectively: "Irreplaceable" and her duet with Shakira, "Beautiful Liar", which spent two consecutive weeks atop the chart. Beyoncé's third studio album I Am... Sasha Fierce garnered six number one songs: "Single Ladies (Put a Ring on It)", "Diva", "Halo", "Sweet Dreams", "Why Don't You Love Me", and "Video Phone", featuring Lady Gaga.

"Telephone", a song by Lady Gaga featuring Beyoncé, became her thirteenth number one in February 2010. Additionally, "Video Phone" became her sixth consecutive number one, a streak which began with "Halo" one year previous, and continued with "Diva", "Sweet Dreams", "Why Don't You Love Me" and "Telephone". I Am...Sasha Fierce became the first album to produce six number-ones between in 2010; Kristine W's album The Power of Music matched this record in 2011. However, Katy Perry broke the record when Teenage Dream produced seven chart toppers over 2010–2012. Beyoncé's fourth studio album 4 generated four number-ones: "Run the World (Girls)", "Best Thing I Never Had", "Countdown", and "Love on Top". At the time of "Love on Top" becoming Beyoncé's eighteenth chart topper, it placed her one ahead of Rihanna, who had achieved 17, and one behind Jackson, who has 19.

"Blow" became the singer's nineteenth number-one in March 2014. In May 2014, "Partition" ascended to the peak position on the chart, becoming Beyoncé's twentieth number one song. With this chart entry, she became just the third singer to amass at least 20 number ones in chart's 38-year history, after Madonna and Rihanna. It also meant that Beyoncé surpassed Jackson for third-most number ones overall. "Pretty Hurts" became her twenty-first number in August 2014; her most recent chart topper is "7/11", her twenty-second number in total. Aside from her solo achievement, Beyoncé also topped the chart three times between 2003 and 2005 with Destiny's Child.

== Fourth: Janet Jackson (20) ==
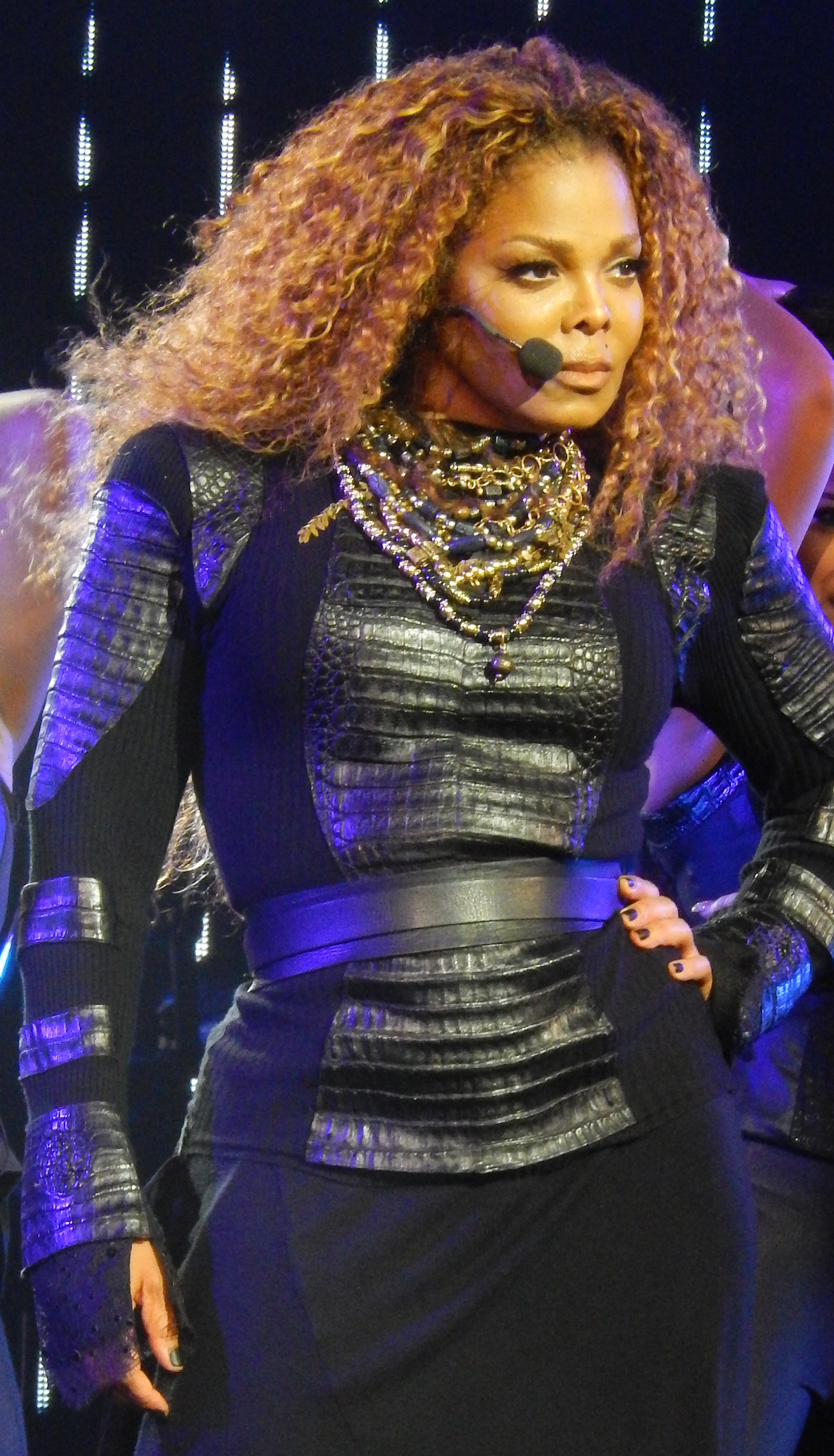
Jackson performing during her Unbreakable World Tour in 2015.

American singer, actress, songwriter, and producer Janet Jackson has achieved 20 number-one songs on the U.S. Billboard Dance Club Songs chart. She also ranks second among the top 100 artists on this chart.

Jackson's history at Dance Club Songs goes back to 1983, when her first entry on this chart, "Come Give Your Love To Me," peaked at number 30 in March of that year, the first of 40 entries, of which 34 would all place in the top 10, including four number 2s.

Control, Jackson's third studio album, has produced three number ones: "When I Think of You", the title track "Control (Janet Jackson song)", and "The Pleasure Principle". Her fourth album, Rhythm Nation 1814, produced four number ones, "Escapade", "Rhythm Nation", "Alright", and "Miss You Much". Her fifth studio album, janet., spawned her eighth and ninth number ones, "That's The Way Love Goes" and "If".

Jackson's duet with her brother Michael Jackson, "Scream", became her tenth number one. Her sixth studio album, The Velvet Rope, produced two number ones, "Together Again" and "Go Deep". All for You also produced two number ones, "All for You" and "Someone to Call My Lover".

Jackson's eighth studio album, Damita Jo, produced the number ones "Just a Little While" and "All Nite (Don't Stop)". Her following two albums each produced a number one single, "So Excited" and "Feedback". In 2010, Jackson's single "Make Me" became her nineteenth number one single.

Jackson would add her 20th number one tally in 2018, when "Made for Now" (featuring Daddy Yankee) reached the top spot in its October 20 issue.

== Fifth: Katy Perry (19) ==
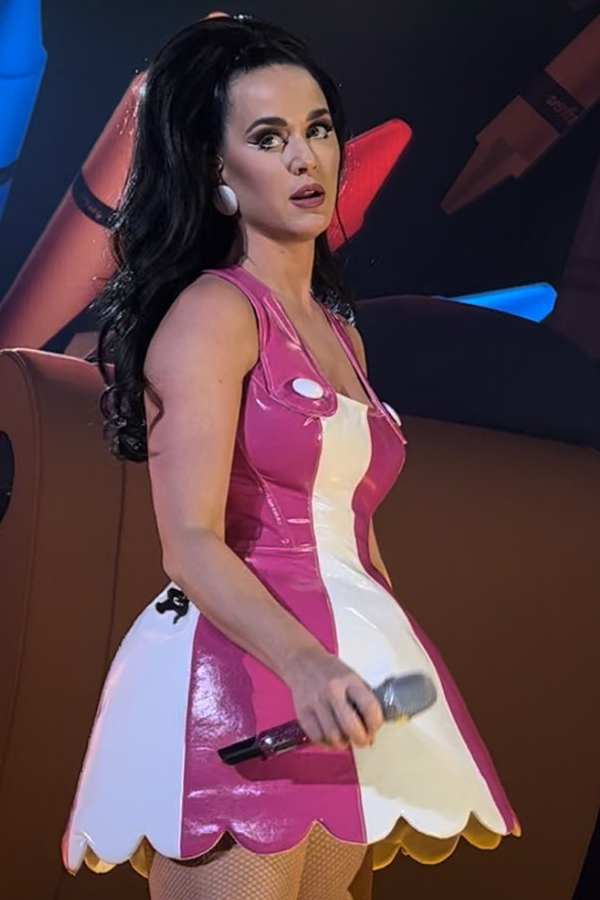
Katy Perry performing during her Vegas residency in 2021.

American singer-songwriter Katy Perry has achieved 19 number-one singles, of which included a record-holding streak of 18 consecutive number-ones, on this chart. Her first was "Waking Up in Vegas" in August 2009, which ranked as the second most spun song on the 2009 year-end chart. Perry's third studio album Teenage Dream (2010) and the songs released from it broke multiple records and garnered several notable achievements on the Dance Club Songs chart. It became the first and only album in the history of the chart to produce seven number-one songs. The recorded was previously jointly held by Beyoncé and Kristine W, whose albums I Am... Sasha Fierce (2008) and The Power of Music (2009) had both produced six chart toppers, respectively.

The first two singles from Teenage Dream, "California Gurls" featuring Snoop Dogg and the title track, became the singer's second and third number-one songs in August and October 2010, respectively. On the 2010 year-end chart, the former finished as the fifth most spun song of the year, while the latter placed at number 34. A non-single track from Teenage Dream titled "Peacock" became her fourth hit on the chart in December 2010. The streak continued throughout 2011, with subsequent singles "Firework", "E.T." and "Last Friday Night (T.G.I.F.)" all topping the chart. "E.T." ranked as the most spun song in bars and clubs across the United States on the 2011 year-end chart, with "Last Friday Night (T.G.I.F.)" ranking as the sixth most played and "Firework" the nineteenth. In January 2012, "The One That Got Away" became Perry's eighth overall number-one, the record breaking seventh from Teenage Dream, and finished as the twenty-first most played song on the 2012 year-end chart. Teenage Dream: The Complete Confection (2012), a re-issue of Teenage Dream, spawned two more chart toppers for Perry in May and August 2012 respectively: "Part of Me" and "Wide Awake".

"Roar", the lead single from Perry's fourth studio album Prism (2013), became her eleventh number-one in October 2013. With this chart entry, Perry tied with Jennifer Lopez for the most consecutive number-one singles, who also had an active streak of 11. Perry broke out of this tie with Lopez when the second single from Prism, "Unconditionally", topped the chart in January 2014, becoming her twelfth. Perry has subsequently continued to extend her own record of consecutive number-songs with each song that she has released since; her thirteenth, "Dark Horse" featuring Juicy J, topped the chart just one month later in February. At the time, Perry tied with Lady Gaga and Whitney Houston for the ninth most number-ones on the chart overall. Assisted by remixes from Cash Cash and Mark Picchiotti, "Birthday" became her fourteenth consecutive hit in June. As a result, Perry broke out of her tie with Gaga and Houston and entered into a different tie with Lopez, this time for eighth most number-ones overall. "This Is How We Do" became Perry's record-holding fifteenth consecutive and most recent number-one song that November, tying her with Donna Summer. Additionally, it became her fourth song to reach number-one in 2014, the most among all acts that year. As a result, Perry became one of only four acts to have achieved four number-one songs in a calendar year in the history of the chart, along with Rihanna, Beyoncé and Gaga.

In October 2016, "Rise" became Perry's record extending sixteenth consecutive number-one song. It became her longest span between number-ones, having previously topped the chart in November 2014 with "This Is How We Do", and broke her streak of having achieved at least one chart topper every year between 2009 and 2014. Perry broke out of her tie with Summer, and into another with Kristine W and Lopez for the sixth most leaders. "Chained to the Rhythm" featuring Skip Marley became her seventeenth consecutive number-one in the chart issue dated April 22, 2017, tying her in fifth place with Mariah Carey. It was followed by "Swish Swish" featuring Nicki Minaj in July 2017, becoming her record-extending eighteenth consecutive number-one song, breaking her from her tie in fifth place with Carey, displacing her into sixth, and into sole fifth position. Billboard writer Gordon Murray indicated that the streak may have been broken owing to Perry's previous single "Bon Appetit" featuring Migos reaching a peak of 28. In its September 21, 2019, issue, Perry added her 19th number one, "Never Really Over," to her list of Dance Club Song tallies.

== Sixth: Jennifer Lopez (18) ==
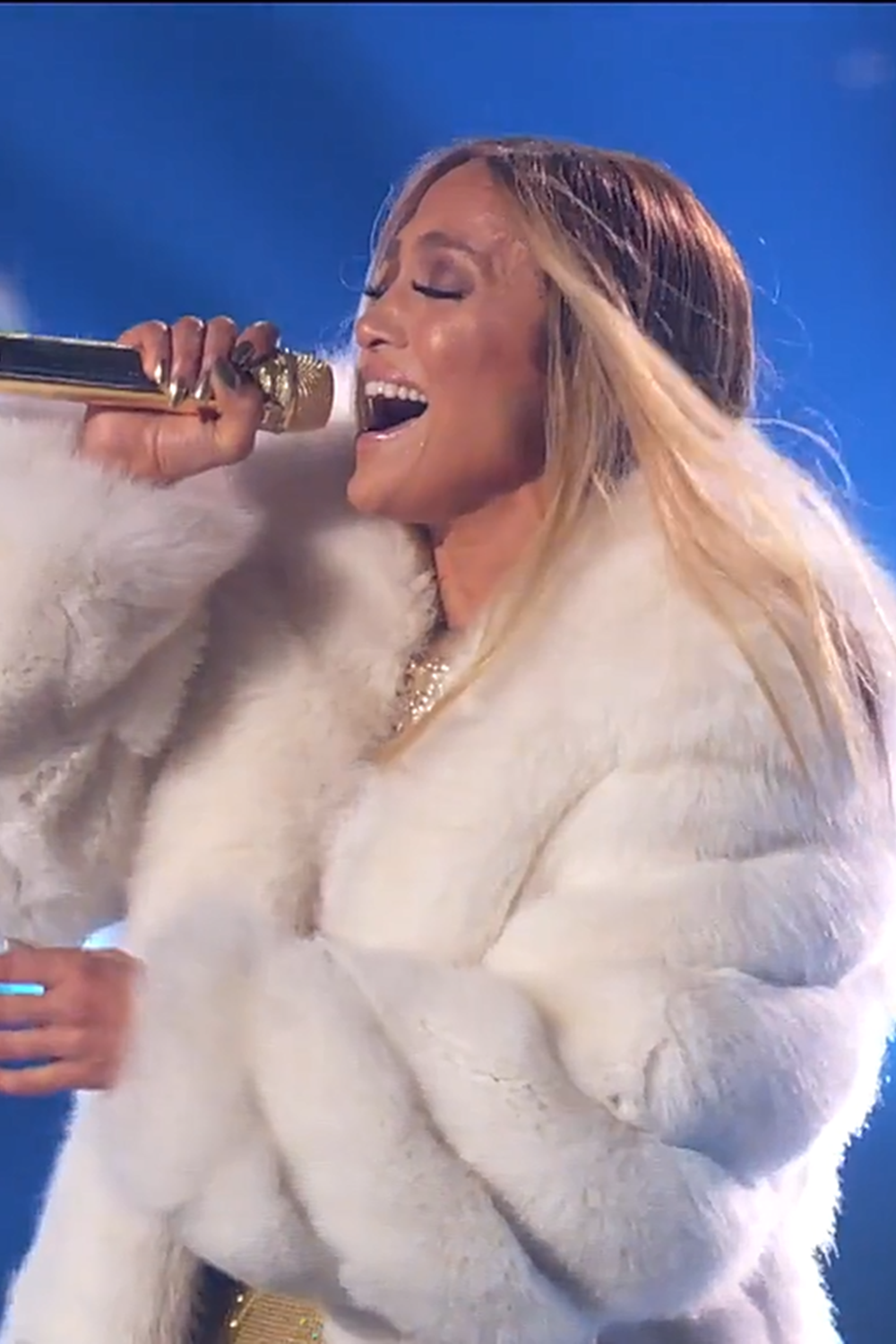
Lopez performing during her MTV Video Vanguard Award before accepting in August 2018.

American singer Jennifer Lopez has achieved 18 number one songs on the U.S. Billboard Dance Club Songs chart, and ranked ninth among the top 100 Dance Club Songs Artists in this category. She achieved her first number one in 1999 with the song Waiting for Tonight. She has had 11 consecutive number one singles. Lopez's 2019 single Medicine, a collaboration with French Montana, became her 17th number one single, tying her for 6th place with Mariah Carey and Kristine W. In 2020, her song Baila Conmigo became her 18th number one on the chart.

During her hit streak Lopez also holds the record for having the most albums to have all singles reach the number one spot, having released 8 number one singles across four albums being Como Ama una Mujer (2007), Brave (2007), Love? (2011), Dance Again... the Hits (2012). The hit streak was broken in 2014 with the release of "I Luh Ya Papi" which peaked at number 5 on the chart.

Lopez's songs that went number 1 on the chart are Waiting for Tonight, Feelin' So Good, Get Right (L. Vega Remix), Que Hiciste, Hold It Don't Drop It, Do It Well, Fresh Out The Oven, Louboutins, On The Floor, I'm Into You, Papi, Dance Again, Goin' In, Live It Up, First Love, Booty, Medicine, and Baila Conmigo.

5 out of the 18 songs feature Pitbull if Remixes are included.

== Joint Seventh (17) ==
=== Mariah Carey ===
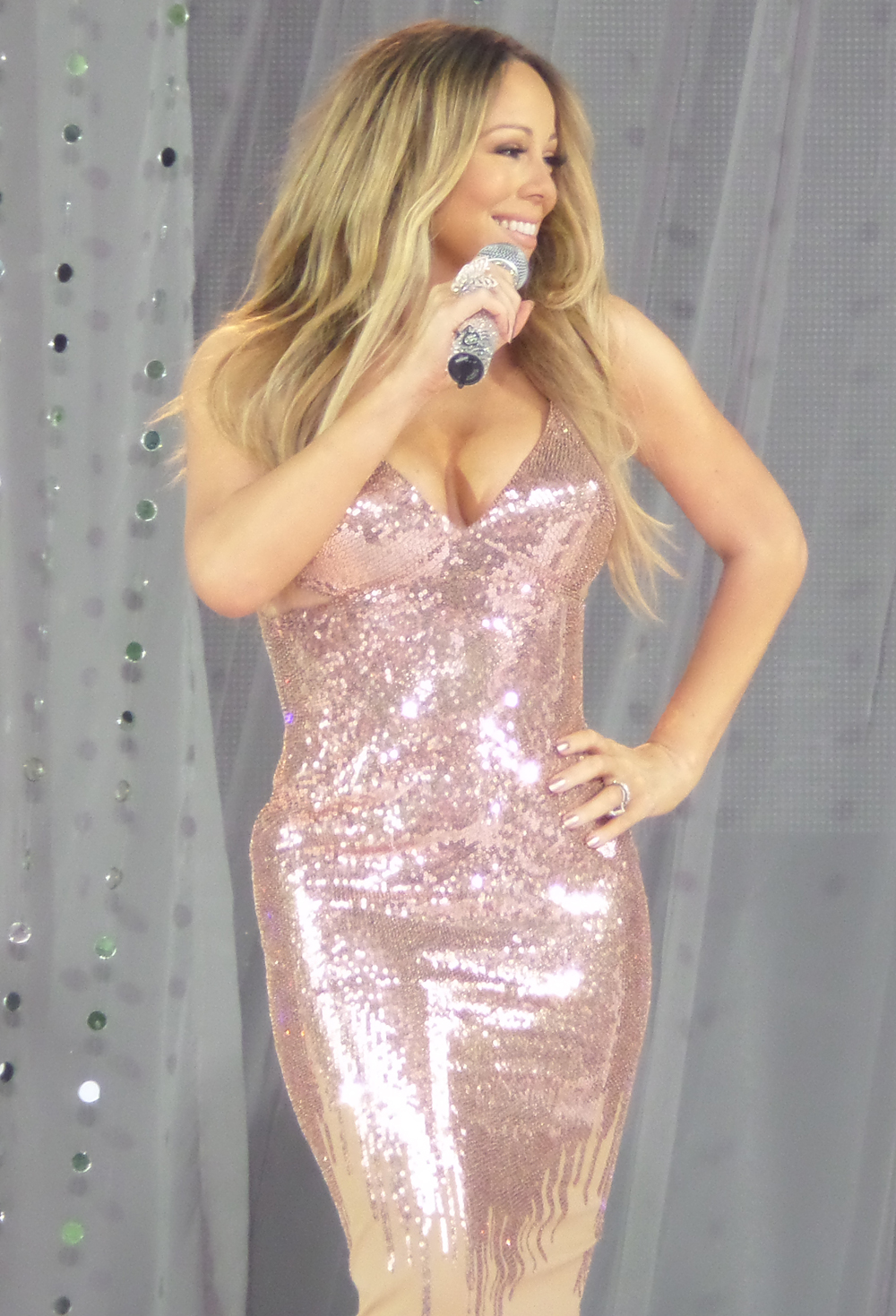
Carey performing on Good Morning America in May 2013

American singer-songwriter, actress, and record producer Mariah Carey has achieved seventeen number-one songs on the chart, and ranks seventh overall among top 100 Dance Club Songs artists in this category. "Someday" became her first in March 1991, which was followed by "Emotions" in November the same year. "Dreamlover" and "Anytime You Need a Friend" from her third studio album Music Box (1993) became Carey's third and fourth chart-toppers in October 1993 and August 1994, respectively. In October 1995, "Fantasy" became her fifth number-one, a position it held for three weeks; it is her only song to have spent more than one week atop the chart. Carey achieved two more number-ones on the chart in the late 1990s; "Honey" in October 1997 and "I Still Believe" in April 1999. In February 2003, remixes by Maurice Joshua, Hex Hector and Full Intention helped "Through the Rain" to become Carey's eighth number-one on the chart, and her first in the 2000s.

Throughout 2005 and 2006, Carey charted four number-one songs from her tenth studio album The Emancipation of Mimi (2005): "It's Like That" (David Morales Remixes), "We Belong Together" (Peter Rauhofer Atlantic Soul Mixes), "Don't Forget About Us" and "Say Somethin'" featuring Snoop Dogg (David Morales Mixes). "Don't Forget About Us" ranked as the third most spun song of 2006 on the year-end chart. Throughout 2008 and 2009, Carey gained three more number-ones with "Touch My Body", "I Stay in Love" and "Obsessed". Carey claimed her sixteenth number-one with the single release "Triumphant (Get 'Em)" in October 2012, tying her with Kristine W for fifth most number-ones. Her most recent is "You're Mine (Eternal)" - aided by remixes from Fedde le Grand, Jermaine Dupri and Gregor Salto - which reached the top of the chart in April 2014. It became her seventeenth in total and broke her out of her tie with Kristine W, up until 2018 when the latter attained her seventeenth number one, thus tying Carey once again.

=== Kristine W ===
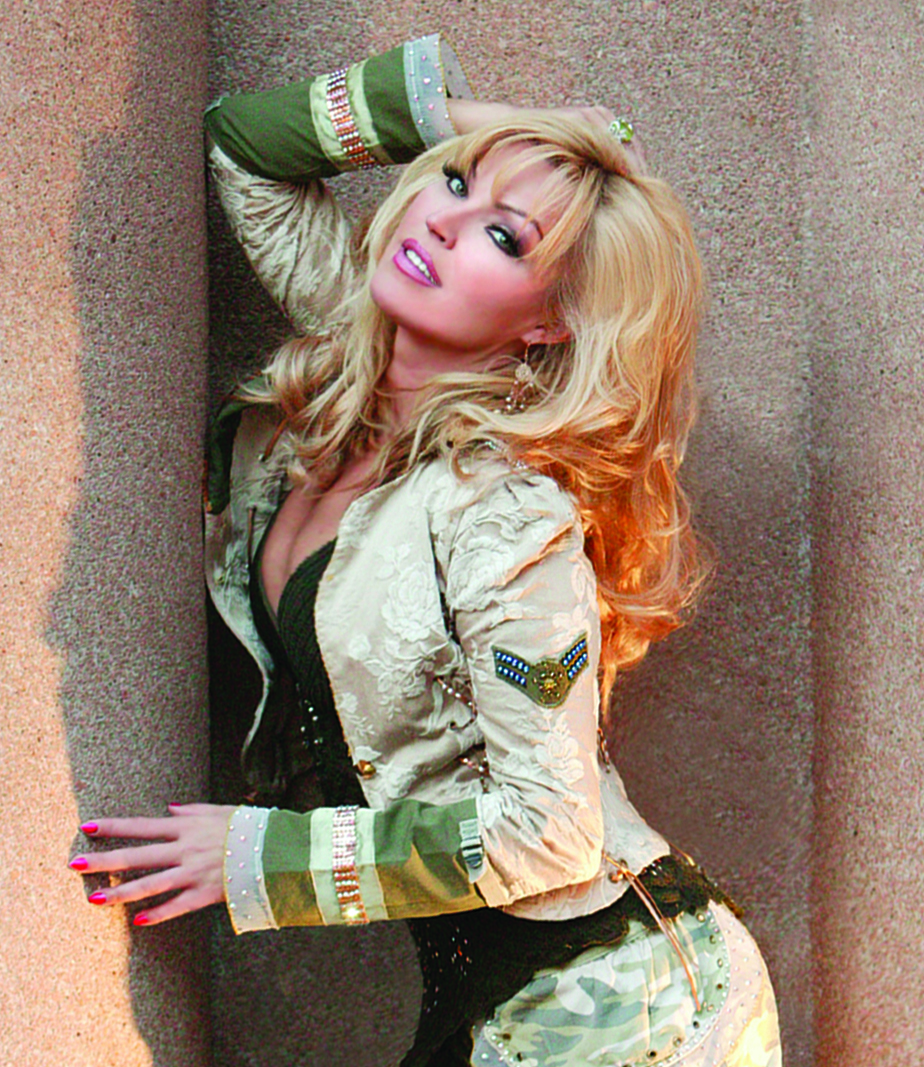
Kristine W in 2009

American singer-songwriter Kristine W has achieved seventeen number-one songs on the chart, and ranks eighth among the top 100 Dance Club Songs Artists overall. She first topped the chart with her debut single, "Feel What You Want", in 1994. She followed it up with her second and third hits in 1996: "One More Try" in May and "Land of the Living" in November, which spent two weeks atop the chart. Between 2000 and 2005, the singer achieved six more number-ones: "Stronger", "Lovin' You", "Some Lovin'" (Murk vs. Kristine W), "Fly Again", "Save My Soul", and "The Wonder of It All". As a result, Kristine W achieved nine consecutive number-one songs, a record. This streak ended when "I'll Be Your Light" peaked at number two in 2006. However, this record was broken by Jennifer Lopez in 2013 who achieved a streak of 11 number-ones, and since has been broken again by Katy Perry, who has achieved a currently unbroken streak of 16. "Walk Away", a song by Tony Moran on which Kristine W features, reached number-one in 2007.

Kristine W's fourth studio album, The Power of Music (2009), became one of only three albums in the history of the chart to produce at least six number-songs, the others being Beyoncé's third studio album I Am... Sasha Fierce (2008) which also achieved six, and Katy Perry's second studio album Teenage Dream (2010), which attained a record holding seven. "The Boss", "Never", "Love Is the Look", "Be Alright", the title track and "Fade" all topped the chart between 2008 and 2011. "The Boss" set a record by being the only song in the history of the chart to reach number-one by three different artists; by the original performer Diana Ross in 1979, and by The Braxtons and Kristine W who covered the song in 1997 and 2008, respectively.

The title track became her fifteenth number-one song, tying her with Mariah Carey for third most chart toppers behind Janet Jackson with 19 and Madonna with 40 (at the time), as well as her sixth consecutive number-one since "I'll Be Your Light". In an interview with Billboard, the singer commented on being one of four artists to have achieved the most number-ones: "I am so honored to be in the company of these amazing women. They are so talented." "Fade" became her sixteenth and most recent number-one song in June 2011 - as well as her sixth from the album - breaking her tie with Carey and assuming sole third position for the most hits behind Jackson and Madonna, at the time of charting. In 2018, Kristine W added her seventeenth number one in the January 27 issue with “Stars.” It also meant that up until this point, 16 of her 18 entries on the chart had reached number-one, the exception being the aforementioned "I'll Be Your Light".

== Eighth: Donna Summer (16) ==
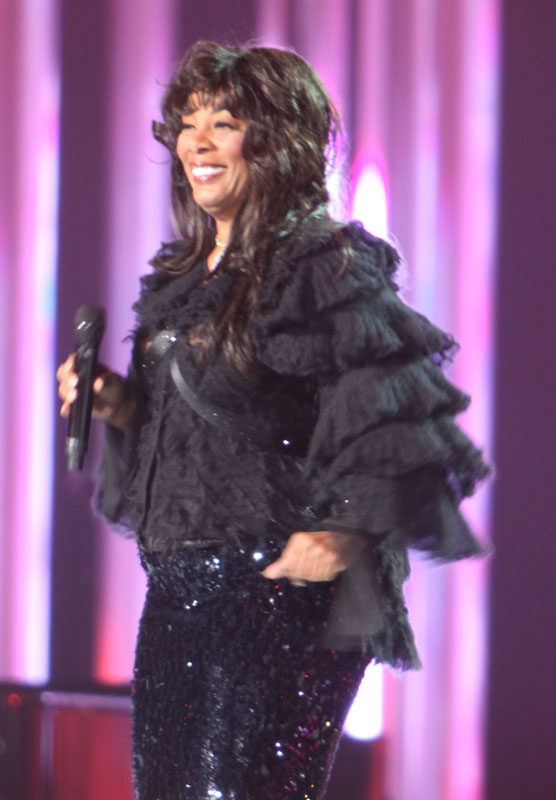
Summer in December 2009

American singer and songwriter Donna Summer achieved 14 number-one songs on the U.S. Billboard Dance Club Songs chart between 1976 and 2010 before her death in May 2012, and ranked sixth among the top 100 Dance Club Songs artists overall. Summer gained her sixteenth number-one posthumously in 2018 with "Hot Stuff 2018". Summer's first two chart-toppers ("Love to Love You Baby" and "Try Me, I Know We Can Make It") occurred in 1975–1976, when Billboard published multiple dance charts that were city-specific. During this time, Billboard rival publication Record World compiled a nationwide dance chart. Noted Billboard statistician Joel Whitburn has since "adopted" Record Worlds chart data from the weeks between March 29, 1975, and August 21, 1976, into Billboards club play history. Billboard columnists, however, only credit Summer with 16 number-ones.

Summer, known widely as the "Queen of Disco", charted several full-length albums on the dance chart, as Billboard policy at the time allowed this (a common practice in the disco era was to segue together several cuts on a side of a vinyl album to replicate a night at a discothèque). In 1977, Summer hit number one with three different albums: Four Seasons of Love, I Remember Yesterday and Once Upon a Time. Her eighth dance chart number-one was "Hot Stuff"/"Bad Girls", two songs that were joined together on her album Bad Girls. These two songs were released separately as singles and both were also number-ones on the Billboard Hot 100. Summer has also hit number one twice with "MacArthur Park" — once in 1978 and again with a remix in 2013; her last number one before her death was in 2010 with "To Paris with Love." She has had at least one number-one dance hit during the 1970s, 1990s, 2000s, and 2010s.

== Ninth: Lady Gaga (15) ==
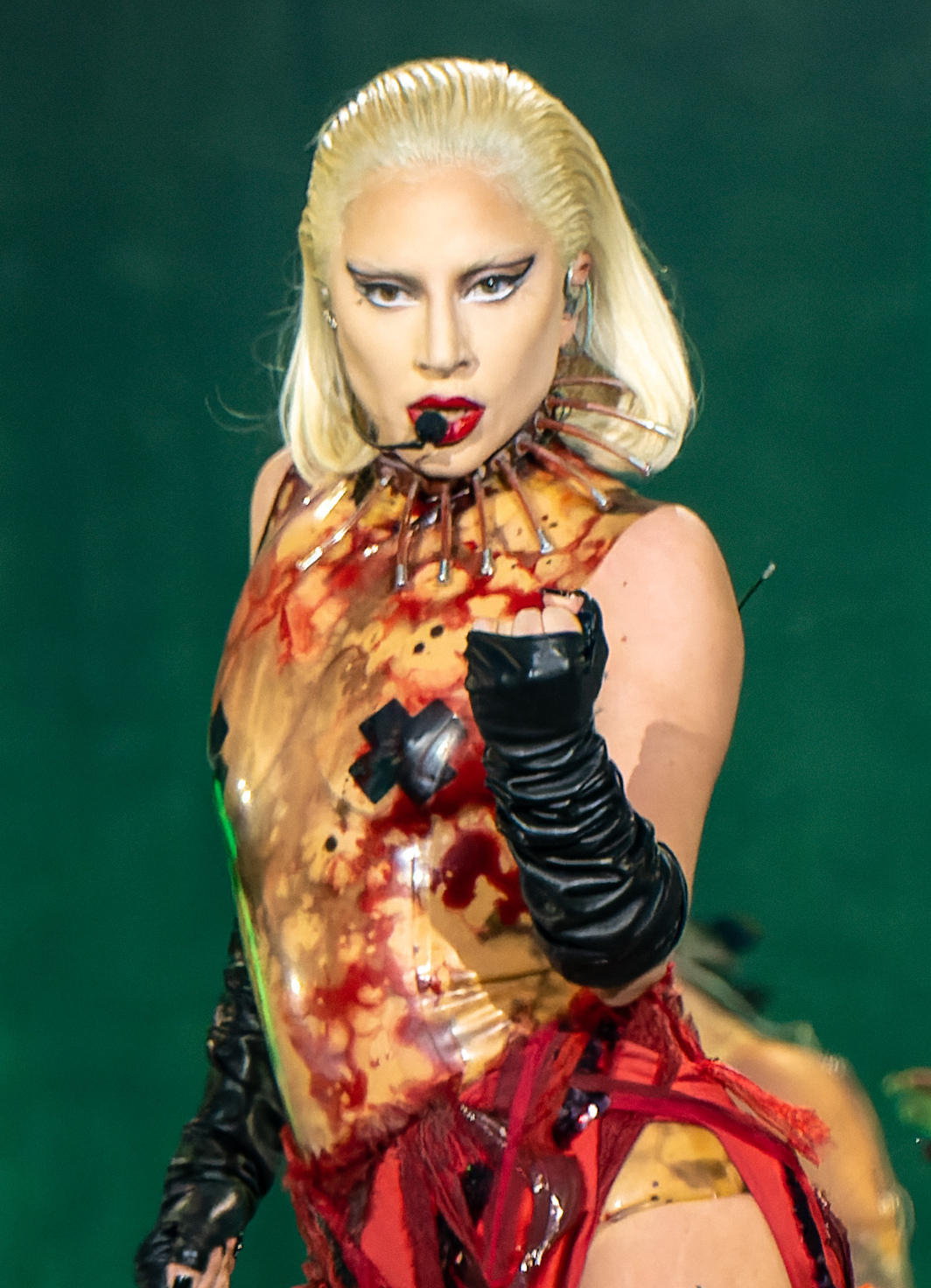
Gaga performing at her concert tour Chromatica Ball.

American singer-songwriter Lady Gaga has achieved fifteen number-one songs, and ranked 16th among the top 100 Dance Club Songs artists in this category. Her first was the second single from her debut album The Fame (2008), "Poker Face", in February 2009. She topped the chart three more times in 2009, with "LoveGame" in July, "Paparazzi" in November, and "Bad Romance" in December. "Bad Romance" reached number-one in just four weeks following its debut and spent two consecutive weeks atop the chart. At the time, Gaga was one of only three acts to have achieved four number-one songs in a single calendar year, along with Beyoncé (who also achieved four in 2009) and Rihanna.

Throughout 2010, Gaga collected three more number-one songs. Two similarly titled tracks, "Telephone" (featuring Beyoncé) and the remix of "Video Phone" (Beyoncé featuring Lady Gaga) became her fifth and sixth chart toppers in February and May, respectively. "Telephone" topped the chart in its fifth week, becoming Gaga's second fastest ascent to the peak after "Bad Romance" which did so in four weeks. In July, "Alejandro" became her seventh number-one out of only eight appearances; her 2008 debut single "Just Dance" reached a peak of number two.

In 2011, Gaga scored four number-one songs in a calendar year for a second time. "Born This Way" and "Judas" became her eighth and ninth chart-toppers in April and June, respectively. "The Edge of Glory" became Gaga's tenth number-one on August 13; with this chart entry, Gaga broke the record for logging 10 chart toppers in the shortest time span in just two years, five months and three weeks, and became the twelfth artist in the history of the chart to log at least 10. The record was previously held by Rihanna, who had achieved ten number-ones between 2005 and 2009 in four years and five months. It also meant that Gaga had tallied the most number-ones since "Poker Face" had done so; Beyoncé and Katy Perry had both achieved seven in the same time frame. It was followed up by her eleventh with "Yoü and I" in October.

In January 2012, "Marry the Night" became Gaga's twelfth number-one. The song became the fifth from Gaga's second studio album Born This Way (2011) to top the Dance Club Songs chart and also matched "Telephone" for her second-quickest ascent to the peak following its debut at five weeks. It once again meant that Gaga had logged the most number-one songs on the chart since "Poker Face" did so, although Beyoncé had since increased her tally from seven to nine. "Applause", the lead single from her third studio album Artpop (2013), became her thirteenth to top the chart in October 2013. Gaga's fourteenth number-one was "Til It Happens to You" in January 2016. A ballad about sexual assault and rape on college campuses in its original form, it was commissioned with nearly 30 remixes from various remixers and producers including Dave Audé, Tracy Young and Dirty Pop, transforming it into a club track. With her 2018 single "Shallow" reaching number one, Gaga moved up to number eight on the ranking, amassing a total of 15 chart toppers.

== Joint Tenth (14) ==
=== Dave Audé ===
American musician, remixer, songwriter, and producer Dave Audé has amassed 14 number ones on the Dance Club Songs chart, making him the only producer on this list to achieve this feat, as well as the only non-singing artist on this list, although if his side project JX Riders is factored in, he actually would have 15 due to having topped the chart with his cover of "Sweet Dreams" during the week of September 10, 2016. He joined this threshold during the week of February 25, 2017, when his updated version of the 2006 Bodyrox single "Yeah Yeah," with the song's original vocalist Luciana, reached the top spot. Among his number ones at Dance Club Songs: "Make It Last" (2007), "Grass Is Greener" (with Sisely Treasure) (2009), "Figure It Out" (with Isha Coco) (2010), "Never Forget" (featuring Lena Katina) (2012), "Something For The Weekend" (with Luciana) (2012), Hold Me (with Yoko Ono) (2012), "Electricity & Drums (Bad Boy)" (with Akon & Luciana) (2013), "Take Me Away" (with Rokelle) (2014), "Aftermath (Here We Go)" (with Erasure singer Andy Bell) (2014), "Hustlin'" (with Vassy and Crazibiza) (2014), "Im Gonna Get You" (featuring Jessica Sutta) (2015), "You Have to Believe" (featuring Olivia Newton-John and Chloe Lattanzi) (2015), and "True Original," (featuring Andy Bell) (2016)

In an interview with Billboard, Audé quoted, "I'm thrilled to have hit No. 1 for the 14th time (with "Yeah Yeah 2017"). I'm honored that my original songwriting and production have resonated as strongly as my remixes and am grateful to all of the DJs and music fans who have supported me throughout the years."

=== Enrique Iglesias ===
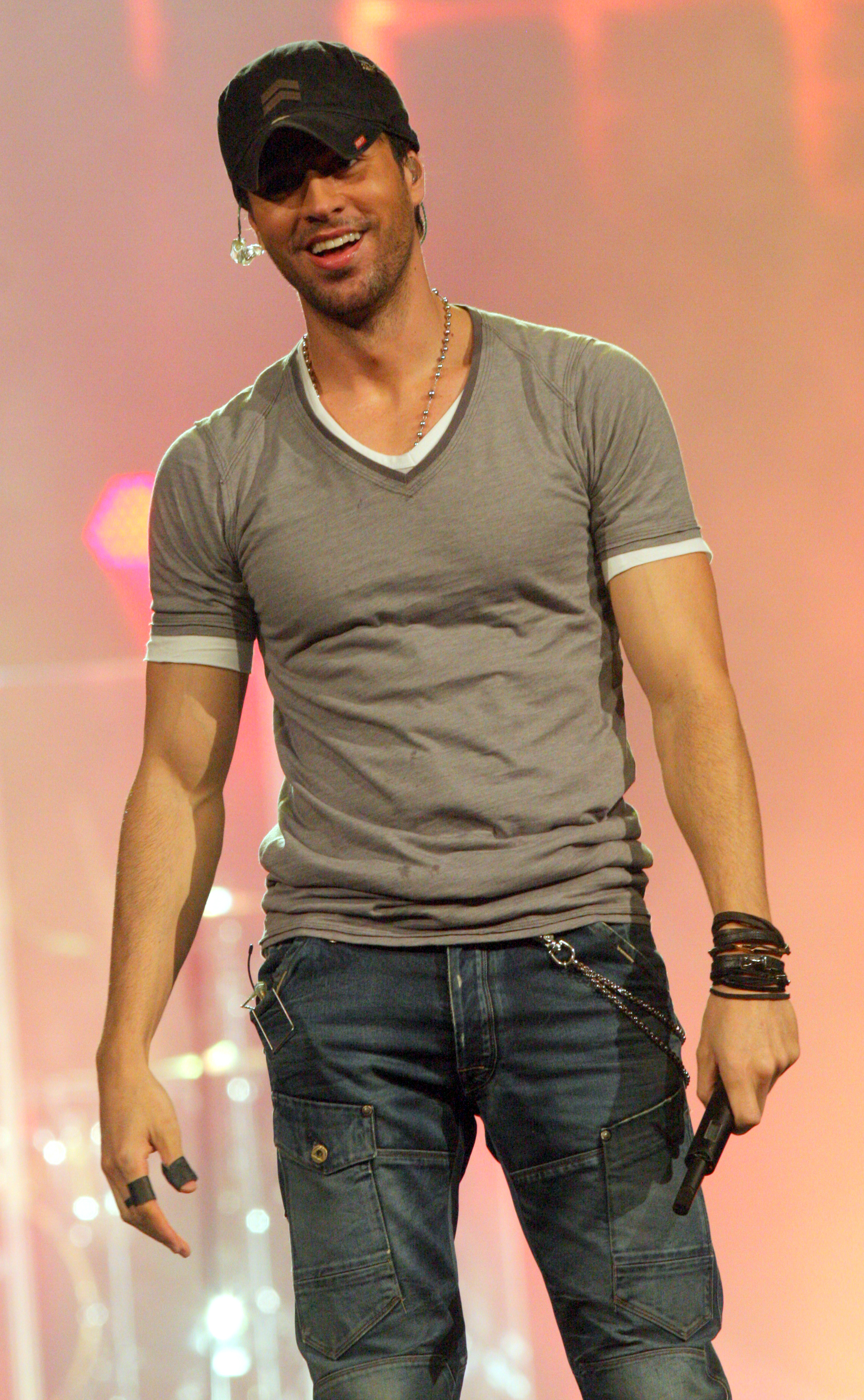
Iglesias at the Euphoria World Tour in August 2011

With a total of 14 chart toppers, Enrique Iglesias, who is 14th among the top 100 Dance Club Songs Artist overall, is the only male artist with the most number-one songs on the Dance Club Play chart so far, although Dave Audé would tie him in February 2017.

His first entry on this chart was also his first Hot 100 number-one: "Bailamos" in 1999 from his Enrique album. The following year "Be With You" was the second song from that album to hit the top of the chart. In December 2001 "Hero" from his album Insomniac hit number one. "Escape" topped the chart in 2002, followed by "Not In Love", featuring Kelis, in 2004. Five years later he hit number one with "Away" (featuring Sean Garrett). During 2010 he hit number one with "I Like It" (featuring Pitbull). In 2011 both "Tonight (I'm Fuckin' You)" (featuring Ludacris and DJ Frank E) and "I Like How It Feels" (featuring Pitbull and The WAV.s) hit number one. During 2013 "Turn The Night Up" extended his record. "Bailando", featuring Descemer Bueno and Gente de Zona, became his thirteenth number one in 2014. On the week ending September 17, 2016, Iglesias broke out of a three way tie among male artists with the most number ones at Dance Club songs with his second Spanish-language track "Duele el Corazón" featuring Wisin. One of the several "Duele el Corazon" remixes that was played in clubs was also remixed by Audé. When Billboard asked Iglesias about making history on this chart, the Spanish-born singer/songwriter came up with this explanation: "No. 1 on the Dance Chart... And I don't dance. Quite amazing, if you ask me!"

=== Pitbull ===
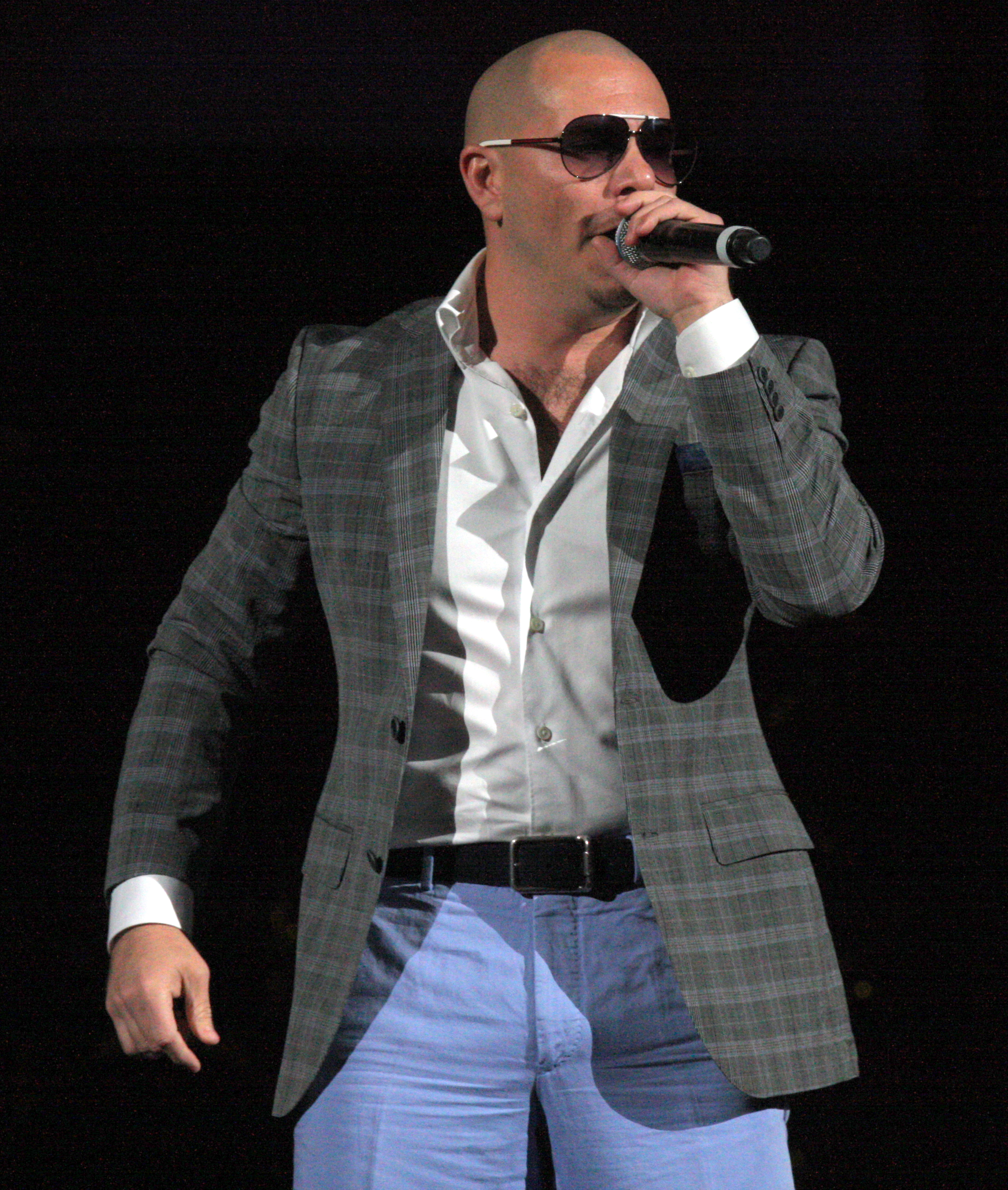
Pitbull on Enrique Iglesias' Euphoria Tour in 2011.

American rapper/singer/producer/songwriter Pitbull became the first rap/hip-hop artist to accumulate the most number ones on the Dance Club Songs chart, having reached the top spot fourteen times in his career, although out the 14 songs, eleven had him as a featured artist: five with Jennifer Lopez (including her alias Lola, and as one of two artists along with Iggy Azalea who share separate collaborations on "Booty"), three with Enrique Iglesias, one with Ricky Martin, and one with Livvi Franc (as his collaboration as a featured artists on her 2009 single "Now I'm That Bitch," for which he also co-wrote, was his first number-one on this chart). He achieved this feat during the week of June 10, 2017, when his featured collaboration with Austin Mahone on the remake of Modjo's "Lady" took the top spot.

=== Kylie Minogue ===
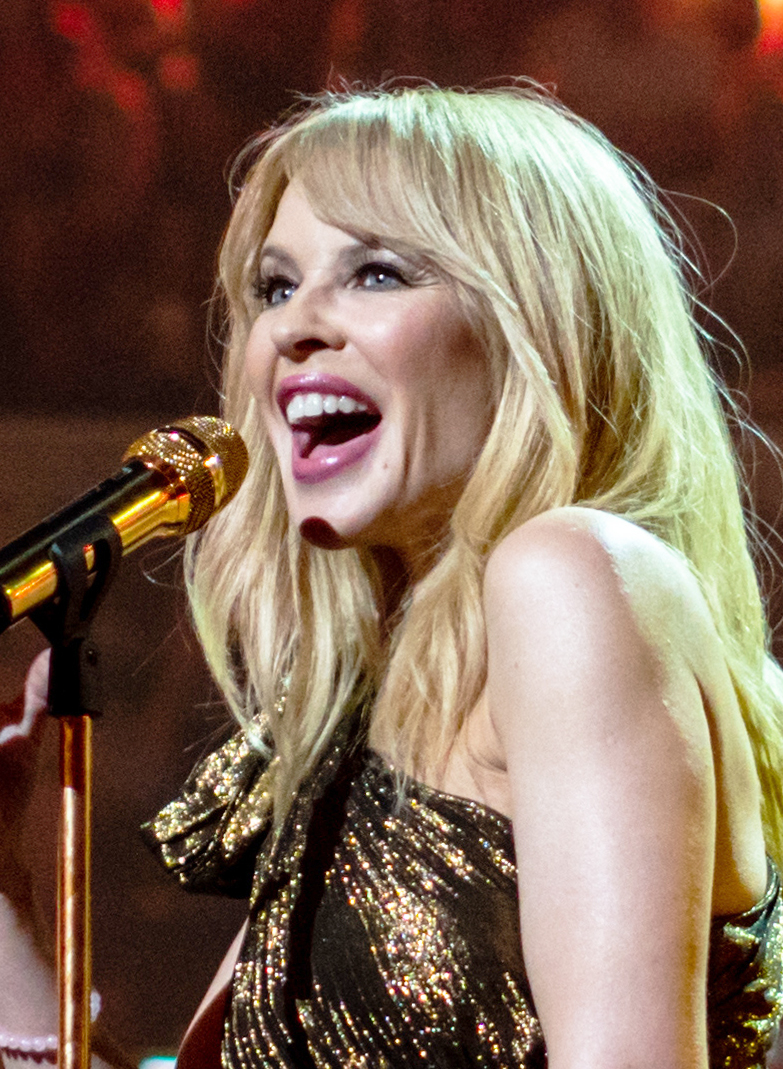
Minogue performing at The Queen's Birthday Party in 2018.

Australian singer-songwriter and actress Kylie Minogue has achieved 14 number-one songs on the U.S. Billboard Dance Club Songs chart, the most of any artist from Australia to date. Although her US chart run began in 1988 with her debut single "I Should Be So Lucky" (which peaked at number 10), it would not be until 2001 when she landed her first number one on the Dance Club Songs chart with "Can't Get You Out of My Head," which also peaked at number 7 on the Hot 100, resulting in her first gold single in the United States. Her nine other number one singles on the Dance Club Songs chart (as a solo artist) included "Love at First Sight" in 2002, "Slow" in 2003, "All the Lovers" and "Get Outta My Way" in 2010, "Better than Today" and "Put Your Hands Up (If You Feel Love)" in 2011, "Timebomb" and "Skirt" in 2013, and "Into the Blue" in 2014. She also has three number one Dance Club Songs singles by way of being a featured artist: "Higher" (with Taio Cruz) in 2010, and in 2015 with "Right Here, Right Now" (with Giorgio Moroder) and "The Other Boys" (with Nervo, Jake Shears and Nile Rodgers). In 2018, Minogue achieved her fourteenth chart topper with "Dancing", the lead single from Golden. The single of course would be her best chart topping placement on any of the international charts so far in 2018.

=== Whitney Houston ===
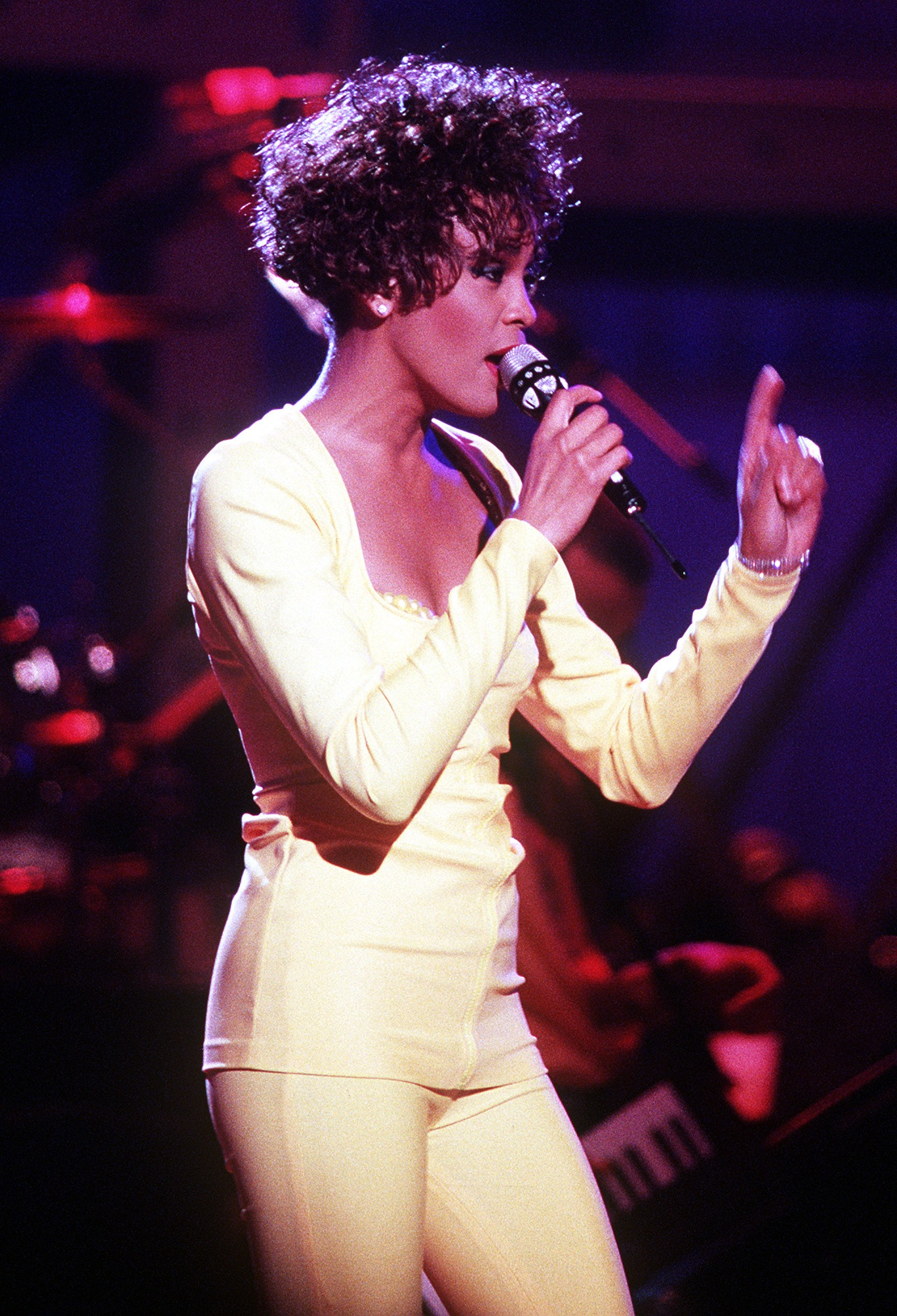
Houston performing at Welcome Home Heroes with Whitney Houston in 1991.

American singer Whitney Houston achieved 14 number-one songs on the U.S. Billboard Hot Dance Club Songs. Achieving her first in 1987 and her most recent, posthumously in 2019, with an EDM version of “Higher Love”.

Houston's second studio album, Whitney, produced her first three number-one songs on the chart. Her first was with the 12" remix of "I Wanna Dance with Somebody (Who Loves Me)" in July 1987, spending two consecutive weeks at the peak. She topped the chart five months later on December 26, with a remix of "So Emotional", which also spent two consecutive weeks atop the chart. "Love Will Save the Day" became her third chart-topper in August 1988, and was her last song to reach the peak in the 1980s. In March 1993, Houston returned to the top of the chart with "I'm Every Woman" which spent two consecutive weeks at number one. On January 29, 1994, "Queen of the Night" became her fifth number one song, and her second to reach the peak from The Bodyguard soundtrack album, following "I'm Every Woman". Her fourth studio album, My Love Is Your Love, produced four number-one toppers — "Heartbreak Hotel", "My Love Is Your Love", "I Learned from the Best" and "It's Not Right but It's Okay".

Houston released Just Whitney in 2002, the album scored three chart toppers — "Love That Man", "On My Own" and "Whatchalookinat". In 2019, ten years after her previous Billboard Dance number-one, “Million Dollar Bill", Houston posthumously scored her 14th. Norwegian DJ Kygo remixed Houston's Japan-exclusive 1990 version of “Higher Love”, which entered the top spot on issue date August 24, 2019.

=== David Guetta ===
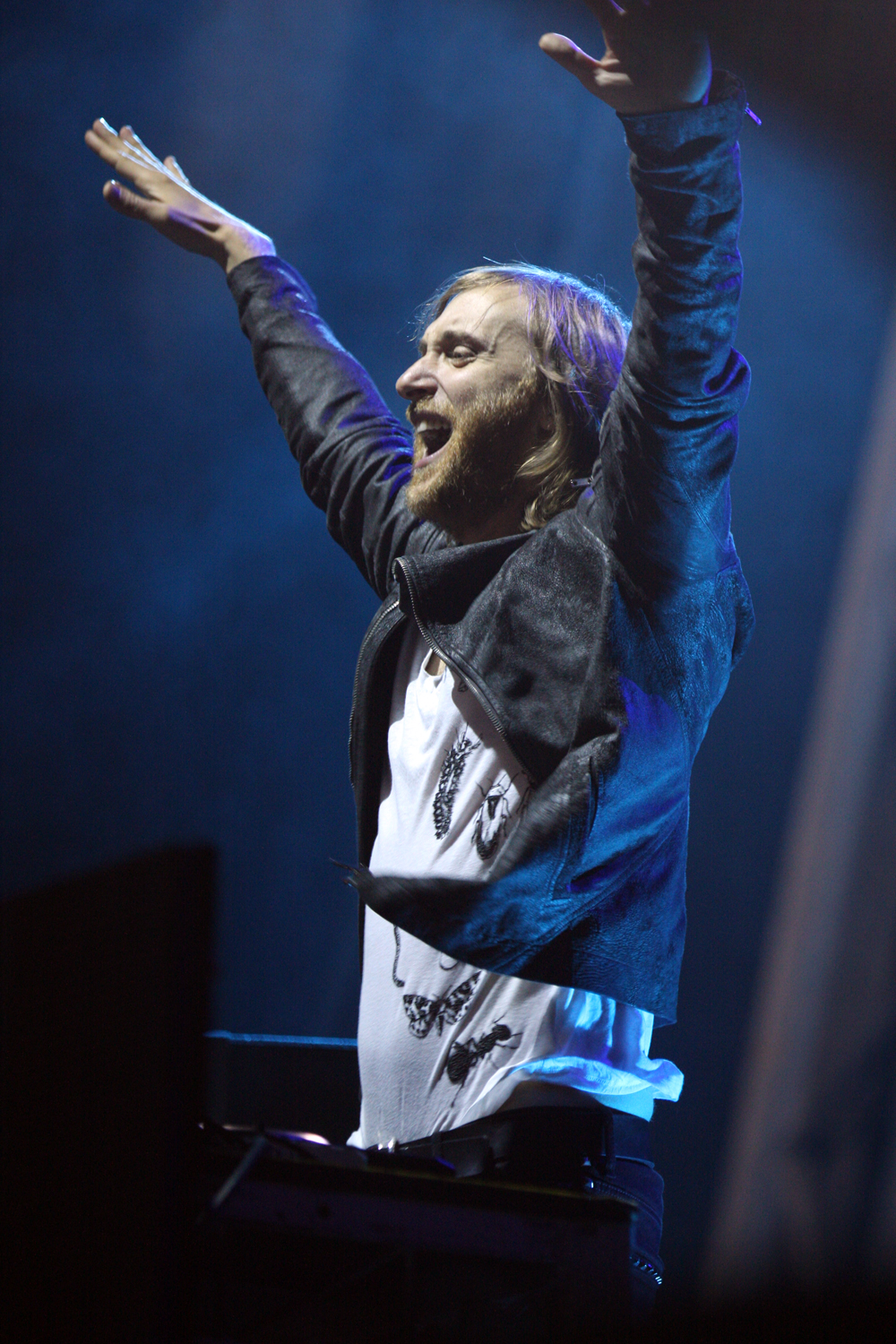
Guetta performing at Creamfields Australia, 2012

French musician, producer, remixer, and television presenter David Guetta has a total of 14 number one hits on Billboard's Dance Club Songs chart, the most of any artist from France to date. Ranked as the number one DJ in the 2011 DJ Mag Top 100 DJs poll, and considered by his peers as the "grandfather of EDM," the Grammy-award winner has placed 36 singles on the Dance Club Songs chart since 2004, when "Just A Little More Love" peaked at number 15 in February of that year.

Guetta's first number one on this chart would come the week of June 20, 2009, with "When Love Takes Over" featuring Kelly Rowland. In addition to the 11 number ones under his real name, Guetta also records under the alias Jack Back, and has placed 3 number ones under that project: "Wild One Two", "(It Happens) Sometimes," and "Put Your Phone Down (Low)". He can also claim the most charted songs on Dance/Mix Show Airplay with 43 titles, eight of them having reached number one since that chart's 2003 inception (only Calvin Harris and Rihanna, both of whom have also worked with Guetta, both lead that chart with 12 number ones each). His most recent number-one hit (at both Dance Club Songs and Dance/Mix Show Airplay) was "Stay (Don't Go Away)" featuring British singer Raye in 2019.

== See also ==
- Dance Club Songs
- List of Billboard number-one dance club songs
- List of artists who reached number one on the U.S. Dance Club Songs chart
