= Fly Again =

Studio album by Kristine W
- Released: 2003
- Genre: Dance
- Label: Tommy Boy Entertainment

Kristine W chronology
Stronger (2000)	Fly Again (2003)	The Power of Music (2009)

Fly Again is the third album from Kristine W. The album was packaged as a double disc album. The album peaked at number 12 on the Top Electronic Albums chart. The first disc was the full-length album, while the second disc contained remixes from Fly Again, continuously mixed by Chris Cox, formerly of Thunderpuss. "Fly Again", "Save My Soul", "The Wonder of It All", and "I'll Be Your Light" were released as singles.

== Track listing ==
=== Disc one ===
1. "Fly Again" (3:53) - Kristine Weitz / Jesse Houk
2. "I'll Be Your Light" (4:07) - John DeNicola / Jack D. Elliott / Patty Maloney
3. "The Wonder of It All" (4:20) - Kristine Weitz / Eran Tabib / Gabriel Dorman
4. "Broken" (4:28) - Kristine Weitz / David Maurice
5. "Living Out Loud" (6:24) - Kristine Weitz / Ray Roc Checo
6. "All That Really Matters" (4:52) - Kristine Weitz / Jack D. Elliott / Andrew Fromm
7. "Crazy Life" (5:15) - Kristine Weitz / Pankaj Bhandari / Matt Edwards
8. "Save My Soul" (4:07) - Niklas Pettersson / Mikael Alfredsson
9. "Letting Go" (4:53) - Kristine Weitz / Hani / Jerrel Black
10. "Bittersweet" (4:51) - Kristine Weitz / Ellis Milah / Jeremy Skaller / Robert Larow
11. "Song Lives On" (4:08) - Kristine Weitz / Peter Reis
12. "Big Big Band" (4:47) - Kristine Weitz

=== Disc two ===
1. "Fly Again (Scumfrog Extended Mix)" (8:05) - Kristine Weitz / Jesse Houk
2. "Save My Soul (Orange Factory Progressive Mix" (6:18) - Niklas Pettersson / Mikael Alfredsson
3. "Letting Go (Orange Factory Extended Mix" (5:35) - Kristine Weitz / Hani / Jerrel Black
4. "Crazy Life (Trendroid Progressive Mix)" (6:26) - Kristine Weitz / Pankaj Bhandari / Matt Edwards
5. "All That Really Matters (Ray Roc Extended Mix)" (5:29) - Kristine Weitz / Jack D. Elliott / Andrew Fromm
6. "Living Out Loud (Ray Roc Extended Mix)" (5:33) - Kristine Weitz / Ray Roc Checo
7. "I'll Be Your Light (Mac Quayle & Jack Elliott Remix)" (7:04) - John DeNicola / Jack D. Elliott / Patty Maloney
