= Bitch I'm Madonna =

2015 single by Madonna

Single by Madonna featuring Nicki Minaj

from the album Rebel Heart
- Released: June 15, 2015
- Genre: EDM; trap; electro; electropop
- Length: 3:47
- Label: Interscope
- Songwriters: Madonna; Thomas Pentz; Ariel Rechtshaid; Maureen McDonald; Toby Gad; Onika Maraj; Sophie Xeon
- Producers: Madonna; Diplo

Madonna singles chronology
"Ghosttown" (2015)	"Bitch I'm Madonna" (2015)	"Medellín" (2019)

Nicki Minaj singles chronology
"The Night Is Still Young" (2015)	"Bitch I'm Madonna" (2015)	"All Eyes on You" (2015)

Music video
- "Bitch I'm Madonna" on YouTube

"Bitch I'm Madonna" is a song by American singer Madonna from her thirteenth studio album, Rebel Heart (2015), featuring guest vocals from Trinidadian rapper Nicki Minaj. The artists co-wrote the song with MoZella, Toby Gad, Ariel Rechtshaid, Diplo, and Sophie. It was released as the third single from the album by Interscope Records on June 15, 2015, along with a number of remixes commissioned. Produced by Madonna and Diplo, it is an EDM song with lyrics about Madonna having continuous fun because she is Madonna.

The song divided music critics, as some called it "energetic", applauding Minaj's rap verse and its unusual composition, while others criticized it for being "desperate to shock". In the United States, "Bitch I'm Madonna" became the first Madonna song to enter the Billboard Hot 100 in three years, peaking at number 84. The song became Minaj's 63rd and Madonna's 57th Hot 100 entry, placing them at positions three and four on the list of women with the most entries on the chart up to that point. It also reached number-one on the Hot Dance Club Songs chart, extending Madonna's lead as the artist with the most number-ones on the US dance chart. Worldwide, the song has reached the top-thirty in Hungary, and the digital charts of Finland and Sweden.

The song's accompanying video, directed by Jonas Åkerlund, has Minaj and Diplo appearing alongside Madonna. The video also contains cameos from Rita Ora, Chris Rock, Jon Kortajarena, Miley Cyrus, Alexander Wang, Beyoncé, Katy Perry, Kanye West, and Madonna's two sons, Rocco and David. It was shot at the Standard Hotel in New York City and shows Madonna and her entourage having a party throughout the building, ending at the rooftop. The release of the video to the streaming service Tidal was plagued by technical difficulties and was met with a mixed response. Critics complimented the craziness of the clip but panned the absence of the guest stars from the set. Additionally, comparisons ensued with then recently released music video for singer-songwriter Taylor Swift's single "Bad Blood", which had featured similar guest stars. To further promote the song, Madonna performed "Bitch I'm Madonna" during her appearance on The Tonight Show Starring Jimmy Fallon, which was received positively. It was also performed on the Rebel Heart (2015–2016) and Celebration (2023–2024) concert tours.

== Background and development ==
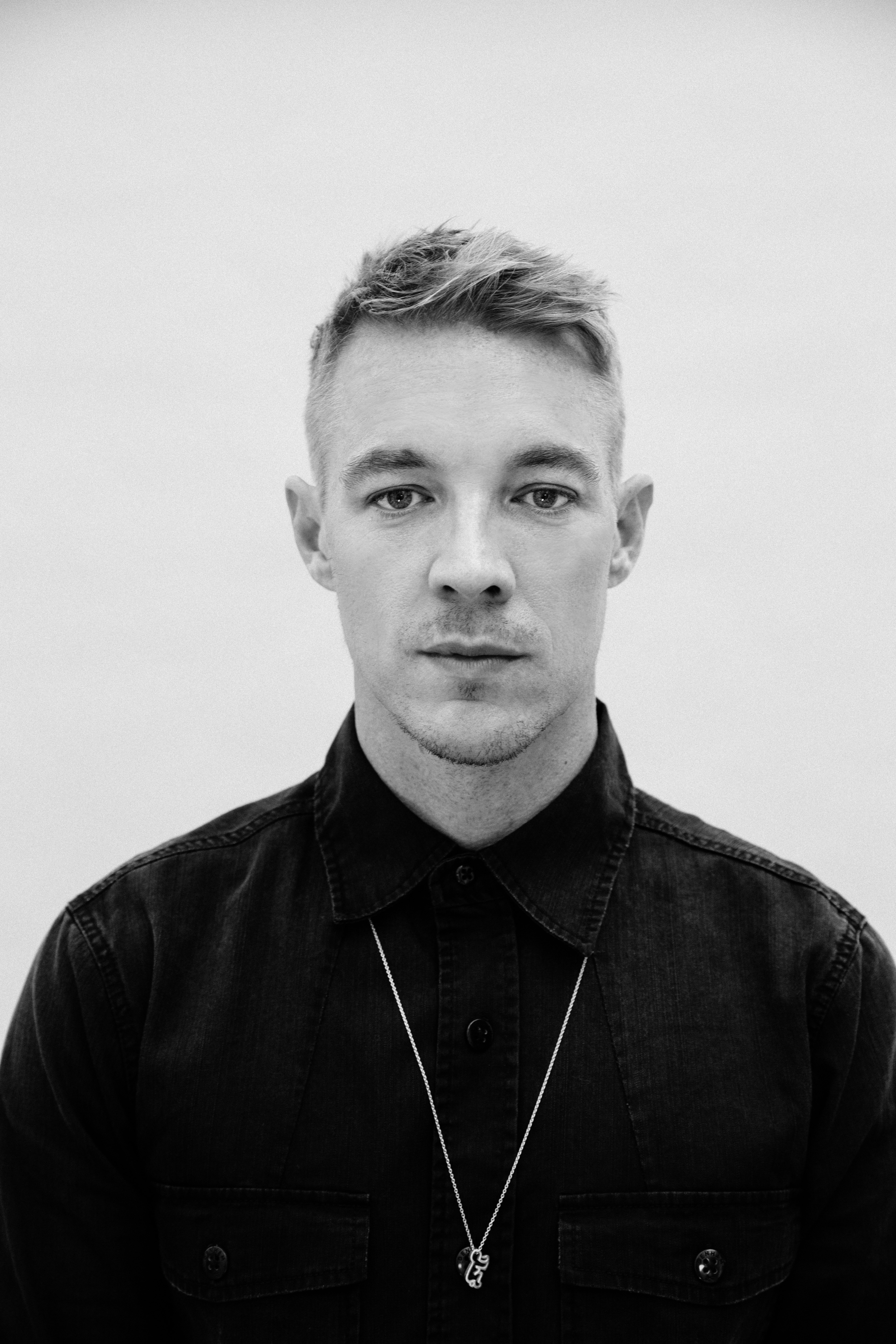
American DJ Diplo co-wrote and co-produced "Bitch I'm Madonna".

In February 2014, Madonna announced that she had begun working on her thirteenth studio album, saying "I'm right now in the process of talking to various co-writers and producers and talking about where I want to go with my music". By the next month she started posting a number of images on social media website Instagram, where she hinted at possible songwriters and collaborators with hashtag captions. Two months later, Madonna posted a selfie where she talked about working with American DJ Diplo. Madonna had invited him to her annual Oscar party, but he was unable to attend. They eventually started talking about music through texts and decided to collaborate on the album. In an interview with Idolator, Diplo explained that Madonna had asked him to provide his "craziest record" for the album. Together they wrote and recorded seven songs and Diplo added that "[Madonna] was up for anything. I love when an artist gives a producer the confidence he needs to work with them, and [she] was very open-minded to my ideas. Those records are gonna be crazy-sounding. We really pushed the envelope with some of the stuff we were doing."

One of the tracks recorded was confirmed by Diplo as titled "Bitch I'm Madonna", which he believed would push his boundaries of songwriting. Madonna explained that the phrase was new to her and was introduced by Diplo, who explained that anyone who could remain cool when faced with criticism was appropriating Madonna, hence it was not just a unique reference to the singer. The origin of the song's idea was traced back to rapper Lil B's 2010 song, "Pretty Boy Anthem", which presented the lyrics "I look like Madonna / Bitch, I'm a farmer". Diplo took this idea to Madonna and developed a song which addressed the singer's detractors, who spoke negatively about her longevity in the music industry, adding "We made this record about, 'Fuck it, bitch, we're all Madonna'". He also insisted that they recruit rapper Nicki Minaj, who had previously worked with Madonna on two songs, "Give Me All Your Luvin' " and "I Don't Give A", from her MDNA album.

Diplo explained to Interview magazine that the song's composition happened while they were drinking one night in the studio. There he played Madonna a Japanese pizzicato melody and a drop, which she liked. Since Madonna preferred to start her compositions on guitar, Diplo added guitar sounds over the melody and then progressed with the writing. Another Instagram post by Madonna confirmed Minaj's involvement in the track, with the photo caption "We go hard or we go home we gon' do this all night long! #werk". Madonna commented about her method working with Minaj:

Whenever we work together she always sits with me and listens to the song, and says "tell me what this song is about to you." She's very methodical in her thinking. We talk about it, she writes down words that I say describing what the song's about and the sentiment that I'd like her to get out there, and then she goes away and she works on it. She writes it, she comes back. She does a version of it, we talk about it. It's a back and forth until she gets it right. It's a total collaboration.

== Release ==
On December 17, 2014, Billboard reported that the demo version of "Bitch I'm Madonna" had leaked onto the Internet, alongside the other twelve demo recordings for Madonna's then untitled thirteenth studio album. An aggravated Madonna clarified that the songs were demo versions from earlier recordings; she compared the leak to that of "artistic rape". She was subsequently criticized for referring to the hack as "terrorism" in the wake of the Peshawar school attack and Sydney hostage crisis. On December 20, 2014, the album became available for pre-order on iTunes Store. When ordered, six tracks including "Bitch I'm Madonna" were available for digital download. Madonna stated that the songs were meant to be "an early Christmas gift" with the final release in March 2015.

Following "Living for Love" and "Ghosttown", "Bitch I'm Madonna" was confirmed as the third single from Rebel Heart by Madonna on her Instagram. She also released three remixes of the song on her YouTube and Tidal accounts for streaming. The cover art of the song was also released along with the remixes; it was created from one of her images on Instagram. The majority of house remixes of "Bitch I'm Madonna" were produced by Rosabel, Sander Kleinenberg and Oscar G, who posted a message on his Facebook account about the collaboration, "When Madonna calls you, you do exactly what she asks. I am very grateful for this opportunity!" Another remix by Sick Individuals, which consist of Dutch duo Rinze "Ray" Hofstee and Joep "Jim" Smeele, was released exclusively to Billboard. The remixes were first released on June 15, 2015, in Australia and Germany, and the next day in other nations.

== Composition and remixes ==
"Bitch I'm Madonna" was co-written and co-produced by Madonna and Diplo, with other writers including Sophie, MoZella, Toby Gad, Ariel Rechtshaid and Minaj. Demacio "Demo" Castellon was the audio engineer for the track and also did the audio mixing and recording. Other engineers who worked on the track included Nick Rowe and Aubrey "Big Juice" Delaine, with Zeke Mishanec helping with additional recording and Angie Teo working on additional mixing. The song was the first time that PC Music, which generally catered to underground music and artists, was working with a mainstream artist like Madonna. Sophie recalled that it was Madonna who was "calling the final shots" for recording the song and noted that there was no label representative who dictated the process.

"Bitch I'm Madonna"
A 22-second sample of "Bitch I'm Madonna" featuring Nicki Minaj's rap verse and Madonna singing the lyrics "we go hard or we go home".

"Bitch I'm Madonna" has similarities to DJ Snake and Lil Jon's "Turn Down for What" (2013) with Madonna's vocals reminiscent of singer Miley Cyrus' autotuned rapping. The song has a "berserk", "bleepy" and "churning" EDM, trap, electro, dubstep and electropop sound. It begins with the sound of acoustic guitar reminiscent of Avicii's single "Wake Me Up" (2012), as Madonna coos in the background, "You're gonna love this", but quickly transitions "past stadium-filling EDM into a genre that more commonly fills the headphones of kids surfing obscure music blogs late at night", as noted by Sasha Geffen, who also compared the sound to the vaporwave genre. The track deviates from a traditional song structure and hook, instead featuring harsh cuts, synths and Madonna singing in a nasal tone. Minaj raps in the track, asking everybody to "go hard or go home", while Madonna shouts lyrics like, "I just wanna have fun tonight, I wanna blow up this house tonight", "alternating between pitch-shifted shrieks of 'Who do you think you are??' and the sing-songy title taunt." Regarding her profuse usage of the word "bitch" in the song (along with another song "Unapologetic Bitch" from Rebel Heart), Madonna defended her decision to Billboard, saying:

I think that's bullshit. The word police can fuck off. I don't want to be policed! I'm not interested in political correctness. The word "bitch" means a lot of different things. Everything is about context. When I first moved to England and heard the word "cunt", I was horrified. People were calling each other cunts! And then I realized that, in that culture, it was different—they slapped each other on the back and said, "Who's the cunt, right, you're my best mate!" The word "fuck" doesn't just mean sexual intercourse. I mean, "You're a stupid fuck", "Are you going to fuck with me?" "Fuck off!" ... Sex has nothing to do with any of those expressions, and the same goes for "bitch". If I say to you, "I'm a badass bitch", I'm owning myself, I'm saying, "I'm strong, I'm tough, and don't mess with me." If I say, "Why are you being such a bitch to me?", well, that means something else.

Since Madonna had to rush-release the first six songs from Rebel Heart due to the hack and leaks, Diplo clarified that the released version on the album was not his final mixing of the track; he later posted his intended cut on his SoundCloud account. Three of the house remixes of "Bitch I'm Madonna" were released as dub versions of the song, with a long drawn-out beat section and minimal vocals from Madonna, as noted by Robbie Daw from Idolator. Kleinenberg's remix had a completely different sound from the house mixes, although Daw believed all of them to be "cheap" sounding in comparison to the original. According to Sick Individuals, their remix of the song had "hard-hitting" beats and it was also an energetic version, catering to the dance floors. Fedde Le Grand's remix of the song did not use any of the effects present in the album version, and was created as an electro house track with metallic sounds.

== Critical reception ==
The song divided music critics. Sasha Geffen from the Chicago Reader gave a positive review of the track, complimenting it for bringing the underground PC Music to the mainstream, adding that "between Diplo's blocky breakdowns and Sophie's slippery arpeggios, [the song i]s a provocative piece of work ... The shift from SoundCloud to superstars was always coming—it just so happens that Madonna is the one who carried it over." Another positive review came from Neil McCormick of The Daily Telegraph, who elaborated: "[T]he track in question fizzes with bright energy, a handclapping rave anthem powered by a fantastically wonky synth line that sounds like a vintage arcade game played on an electronic kazoo, and topped off with a snappy Nicki Minaj rap. Madonna delivers the melody like a playground nursery rhyme, chanting about bad behavior in a butter-wouldn't-melt sing-song voice."

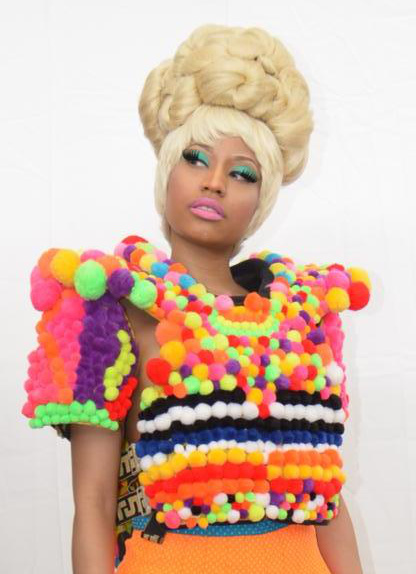
Nicki Minaj's (pictured) verse was praised by most critics.

Dan Weiss from Spin observed that the "most surprising thing about a song that's actually called 'Bitch, I'm Madonna' is that it doesn't have any surprises". In contrast, Andrew Unterberger of the same publication enjoyed the track, claiming that "it might not be your favorite Madonna, but it's unquestionably her, and it's far more compelling than the anonymous EDM enthusiast she played on MDNA (2012)". Unterberger also praised the addition of PC Music "ping-ponging oddball freneticism" and "Diplo's block-dropping beats". Caryn Ganz of Rolling Stone was also positive, calling it "frenetic", and praised Minaj's verse for being "pure fire", while Anna Zelaski of The A.V. Club appreciated the song for being "the right kind of [track] ... that's mindless fun and impossible to take seriously". In the same vein, Andy Gill of The Independent called it "amusingly abrasive" and praised Minaj for "repris[ing] her role as Madge's rapping henchgirl".

In spite of noting that Diplo makes Madonna sound fun on the song, Gavin Haynes of NME commented that the song's composition "showed the gulf between [Madonna's] life and her music is now impossible to ignore". Calling it "awry", Alexis Petridis of The Guardian claimed that "Bitch I'm Madonna" is "a fantastic title in search of a song. In lieu of one, producer Diplo comes up with a kind of hybrid of EDM and happy hardcore and throws Nicki Minaj at her most hyperactive into the mix; the result genuinely sets your teeth on edge." Criticizing Rebel Heart for being "overworked", Sal Cinquemani of Slant Magazine found that "the duality of its title [is] muddled by the inclusion of garish party jams like the infuriatingly catchy but lyrically cringe-inducing 'Bitch I'm Madonna'". John Murphy of musicOMH remarked that the song "never quite lives up to its fantastic title, and just sounds a bit of a mess, trying to cram in Diplo-produced dance-hall rhythms, a dubstep breakdown and the seemingly now obligatory Nicki Minaj guest rap". Evan Sawdey of PopMatters opined that the song—and another Rebel Heart track, "Illuminati"—"absolutely reek of desperation, wanting so badly to shock and offend listeners that they fail to resolve as satisfying songs first and foremost".

In their retrospective list of 2015's "song of the summer" contenders, Pitchfork stated that "In an alternate (just) universe, 'Bitch I’m Madonna' became the hit song every summer needs, a celebration that asserts its own right to celebrate." In their year end ranking of the best songs from 2015, Entertainment Weekly listed "Bitch I'm Madonna" at number 27, saying "She go hard or she go home, she gon do this all night long—[Madonna]'s standout from Rebel Heart has everything you love about her music: hooks, humor, attitude for days". In 2018, the same magazine listed it as Madonna's 60th best single. Chuck Arnold called it "much better than 'Give Me All Your Luvin'' ... this Diplo-produced banger is campy fun that throws a fierce side eye". Similarly, while ranking the singer's singles in honor of her 60th birthday, Jude Rogers from The Guardian placed the track at number 67, calling it "energetic, but exhausting".

== Commercial performance ==
In the United States, "Bitch I'm Madonna" debuted on Billboard's Dance/Electronic Songs chart dated January 3, 2015, at number 14 with sales of 12,000 copies. The song started fluctuating down the chart and exited after four weeks, but following her appearance on The Tonight Show Starring Jimmy Fallon in April 2015, the sales surged by 748% to 9,000 copies, making the song re-enter the chart at number 21. The song again started a downward trajectory on the chart until June 2015, when the music video was released. Sales for that week increased to 13,000 copies, enabling the song to reach a peak of number 5 on the chart, becoming Madonna's second top-ten single there following "Living for Love". The song debuted at number 26 on the Hot Dance Club Songs chart and reached a peak of number-one, her record-extending 46th in total; it was also Minaj's fifth number-one. "Bitch I'm Madonna" debuted on the Billboard Hot 100 chart week of July 4, 2015, at number 84, becoming her first entry on the chart since "Give Me All Your Luvin' " (2012). The entry was aided by a 1,454% gain in streaming activity for the track, with a total of 2.6 million US streams up to the week ending June 21, 2015. The track became Minaj's 63rd and Madonna's 57th Hot 100 entry, placing them at positions three and four on the list of women with the most entries on the chart. The following week, the song fell down by 11 places on the Hot 100, landing at number 95, which was its final appearance there.

In the United Kingdom, Alan Jones from Music Week reported that following the release of the music video, there was a sales surge for "Bitch I'm Madonna", which sold 1,667 copies (up from 148 copies of previous week); however, it was not able to chart within the top 200 positions of the UK Singles Chart. In France, the song debuted at number 90 on the French Singles Chart the week of December 27, 2014, following the advanced release of the album's six tracks for pre-order on iTunes. Later, it fell to number 135, before dropping off the chart. The song re-entered at number 104 when the music video was released, and fell to number 149 the following week. In Spain, the song also debuted with the advanced release, reaching number 49. On June 5, 2024, the song surpassed 100 million streams on Spotify, making Madonna the first female and female lead artist to have one song from five different and consecutive decades to achieve this.

== Music video ==
=== Background and development ===
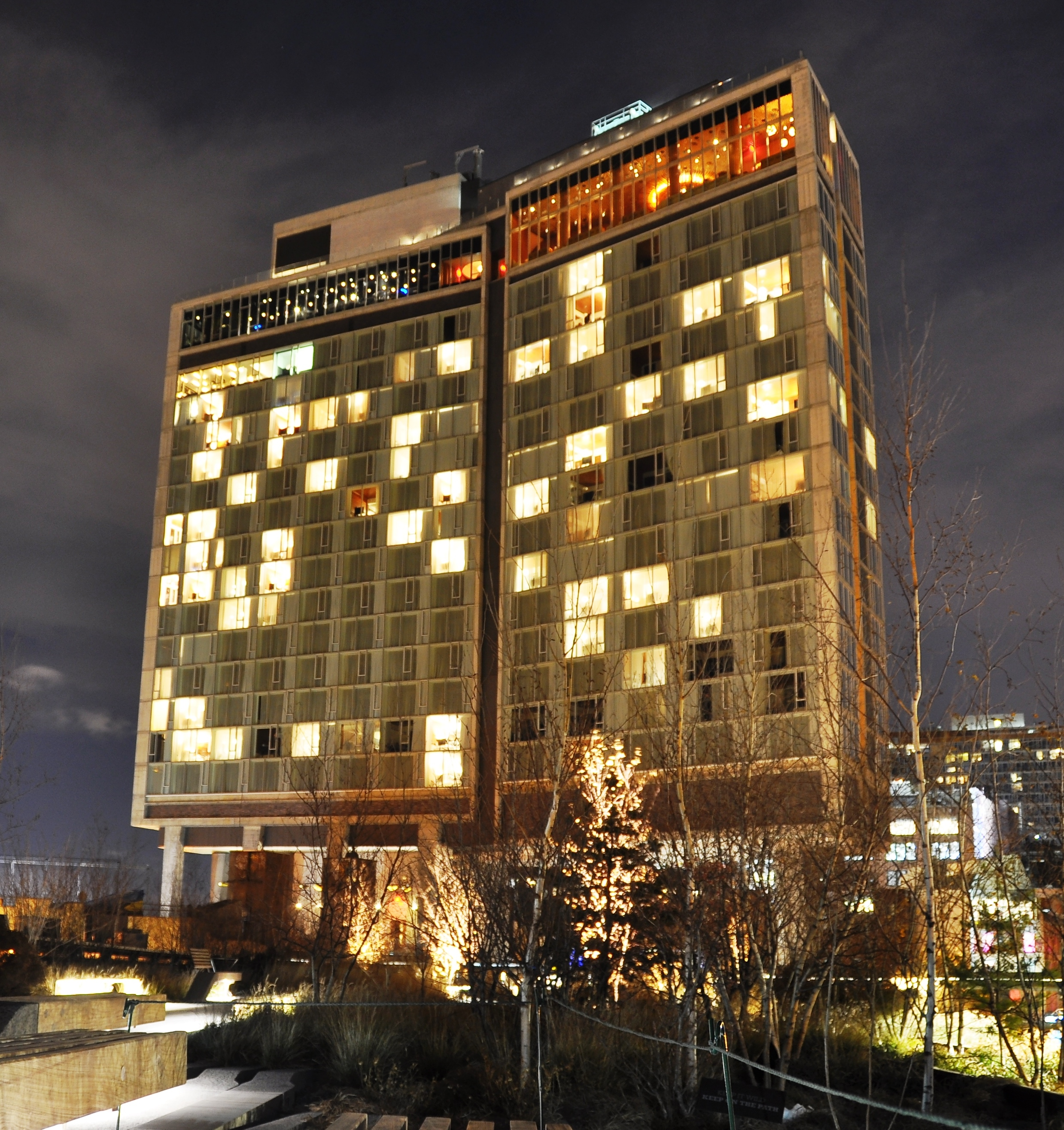
The Standard Hotel, where the video for "Bitch I'm Madonna" was filmed

Along with announcing "Bitch I'm Madonna" as the third single, Madonna also confirmed the release of a music video for the song. She teased in a post on Instagram saying that the video would have many "surprise" guests. A number of people were tagged in the Instagram post, including singers Beyoncé, Katy Perry, Miley Cyrus, and Rita Ora, as well as Minaj and Diplo. Other personnel tagged included costume designer Arianne Phillips, hair stylist Andy Lecompte and fashion designer Jeremy Scott. Comparisons ensued with the recently released music video for singer-songwriter Taylor Swift's single "Bad Blood" which had featured similar guest stars. Madonna had also released images from the set previously, showing her with pink hair and in provocative clothing. Another preview came from the Flaming Lips lead singer Wayne Coyne, who had visited the set and uploaded a short video of the shooting. Filming took place on the top floors of the Standard Hotel in New York City, and was directed by Jonas Åkerlund, who explained how he landed the project as follows:

'Madonna called me about 'Ghosttown'. We hadn't worked for a while because of different circumstances so when I heard all the songs [on Rebel Heart], I was very excited about 'Ghosttown'. I connected to it creatively. And, yeah, we enjoyed working together. I was supposed to start something else right after and that got pushed and she asked me to do 'Bitch I'm Madonna'. I saw it being so completely different from 'Ghosttown', something a little bit less serious, just fun and crazy.

The team had a short time for finalizing the different aspects of the shoot, including rehearsing the whole sequence. They also had just one night to complete shooting and due to the casual nature of the song, decided to invite Madonna's close friends and family to be in it. Contrary to normal shooting schedules, the team had to work fast before the sun came up, since they were portraying a party at night. Following the choreography, every person on set had cues about their position and where their part would come in the shooting. A number of designers contributed clothing for the singer to wear, including Moschino, Discount Universe, SSUR, Chanel, Majesty Black and shoes by Giuseppe Zanotti. According to Amber Kallor from Style.com, various contemporary fashion trends appeared in the video, including candy-colored hairs, black lips, white bows and glitter eye makeup.

=== Release ===
The video was confirmed to be released on June 16, 2015; Madonna also released a teaser of it, which showed the aftermath of a party, as the song played slowly in the background. On the release day, a poster was uploaded on Madonna's Instagram which confirmed that along with the aforementioned personnel, singer Beyoncé would also appear in it. Joe Lynch from Billboard compared the poster to those uploaded during the release of "Bad Blood" but nevertheless believed, "it's likely that Madge had this project in the works before becoming aware of Taylor's plans". However, the video did not arrive on June 16, instead a second teaser was released, showing Madonna twerking in jeans shorts and high heels, with multi-colored graphics. It ultimately premiered the next day on Tidal, along with a behind-the-scenes clip. It was an exclusive release to the streaming site for the first 24 hours, following which it was released on Madonna's Vevo page. The full list of guest appearances in the video included Beyoncé, Perry, Cyrus, Minaj, Ora, and Diplo along with rapper Kanye West, actor and comedian Chris Rock, designer Alexander Wang, model Jon Kortajarena and Madonna's sons Rocco and David. However, the video faced problems in Tidal with error messages and freezing in-between, resulting in the company releasing an apology on Twitter: "We apologize to all the fans excited to watch the #BitchImMadonna video, we’re working on a fix. We'll have it up and running soon."

=== Synopsis ===
A screenshot from the video showing Madonna (left) beside a video screen, where Minaj is shown performing her lines. The absence of the guest stars from the set was negatively received.

The video begins with four young girls in outfits inspired by Madonna's iconic "Like a Virgin" performance at the 1984 MTV Video Music Awards, who mime the opening lines of the song. Madonna is shown exercising alongside, wearing an animal print dress and a studded, pink motorcycle jacket. She finishes and comes out in a colorful hallway, drinks water, kisses a man and walks through the corridor, crossing Diplo at one point. As the chorus starts the scene cuts to four Japanese dancers (including AyaBambi) making choreographed moves in a bathtub and inside a bar as Madonna joins them. Ora and Rock appears mouthing the phrase "Bitch I'm Madonna". The second verse starts with Madonna crawling along the hallway, getting entangled in balloons, meeting Diplo again and finally the camera pans away to reveal a number of sock puppets in neon glow swaying together to the song.

During the second chorus, Madonna and her dancers go from the hallway to a bar where the singer forcefully makes Kortajarena drink a beverage, dry humps a dancer and continues dancing. The guest appearances start with Cyrus pointing her middle fingers towards the camera wearing glitter around her eyes, followed by Wang, Diplo and Rocco in the bar, Beyoncé posing like Madonna's music video for "Vogue" (1990), Perry moving around to the song, and David dancing while Madonna and the others cheer him; all of them mouth the song name while they appear onscreen. As the chorus ends, a dancer brings a video screen behind them where Minaj appears rapping her part, interspersed by shots of West cheering. Madonna and her dancers continue moving through the room with falling confetti and reach a dance pole. She climbs through a set of dimly lit stairs and reaches the rooftop where the party is taking place. The song nears to an end and Madonna is shown surrounded by her dancers and some partygoers while she lies down; interspersed scenes show her twerking and dancing alone in a room wearing a cap with Hebrew word "שלום" ("Shalom") written on it. The video ends with a far away shot of the Standard Hotel's brightly lit rooftop where the party continues.

An alternate ending was present in the behind-the-scenes video, showing an exhausted Madonna leaving the party with a male model, as well as aftermath scenes of the party which were released in the first teaser trailer. The parting shot showed Madonna running around the room and posing in front of the windows overlooking New York. Other scenes included Madonna chatting with Ora and Rock in-between takes, sitting in the hallways, plunging towards the neon sock puppets multiple times as well as singing the song with the little girls from the beginning of the video. Another video set to Kleinenberg's remix featured further footage of Madonna dancing and more casual scenes featuring the guest stars.

=== Reception and analysis ===
Jason Lipshutz from Billboard wrote an article about why the video was an important release for Madonna. He felt that although the Rebel Heart era had received more promotion than the previous MDNA era, the commercial returns had been diminishing. The first two singles, "Living for Love" and "Ghosttown", failed to chart on the Billboard Hot 100, making it the first Madonna album without a Hot 100 single, until "Bitch I'm Madonna" debuted at number 84. The video, Lipshutz theorized, was Madonna's attempt to bring back an audience for the whole era. Joe Lynch from the same magazine called the video an "embarrassment of star power", adding that it "has everything: Miley's middle fingers, Madonna kissing a shirtless hunk, topless women in a bathtub, break-dancing, sock puppets singing, Moschino fashion and much more". Brennan Carly from Spin believed that the "grandeur and ambition" of the clip made it comparable to Madonna's music videos for "Hung Up" (2005) and "Living for Love".

Kevin O'Donnell from Entertainment Weekly said that although "[a]nytime Madonna announces a new video, it's a global event. And it's no different with ['Bitch I'm Madonna']", he called it "her most bonkers video in years". Hicks from the San Jose Mercury News was impressed with the video, but felt Madonna could have done it without the guest appearances. Emilee Linder from MTV News observed that the video was completely different from the one released by Swift, but described it as "action-packed" in a different way, that of portraying a party. Daniel Kreps from Rolling Stone declared that, with the release of "Bitch I'm Madonna", "the age of blockbuster all-star music videos are upon us". Both Nolan Feeney from Time and August Brown from the Los Angeles Times noted that Madonna was able to successfully bring together her music industry peers in one video.

Christopher Rosa from VH1 criticized the fact that none of the female singers apart from Rita Ora were actually present on set during shooting of the video; their parts were filmed separately. He added that it was "pretty hilarious. Madge's clip is called, 'Bitch I'm Madonna', but why couldn't she get these youths to show the eff up?" Writing for Life & Style magazine, Chantal Waldholtz was disappointed with the clip, calling it "lackluster" due to the short cameo appearances. Kevin Fallon from The Daily Beast called the video "pathetic and sad" and questioned the inclusion of guest stars like Swift's video, ultimately describing the whole affair as "absolutely pointless. At worst, it's desperate. At best, it's just dumb ... [The video] is a fascinating mix of impressive and sad, both aggressively relevant and therefore wholly irrelevant at the same time." He ended the review with one compliment about the single take in which the video was shot, comparing it to the 2014 black comedy film Birdman.

Bernard Zuel from The Sydney Morning Herald spoke about the problems with the release to Tidal, saying "Apologies, embarrassment and another social media fail: is this already a new low water mark for Madonna and Tidal only weeks after it began operating?" He criticized Madonna's team for not being able to release the video smoothly, while also noting that negative feedback given to the video included "Madonna's age, sexually charged performances, [and] need to shock". Tshepo Mokoena from The Guardian considered the cameos as more of "slapdash than slick", appearing as "flat and glossily detached". Time magazine listed the music video at number 8 on their ranking of the "Top 10 Pop Music Videos of 2015", describing it as "nuts as its croaking bass drop".

== Live performances ==
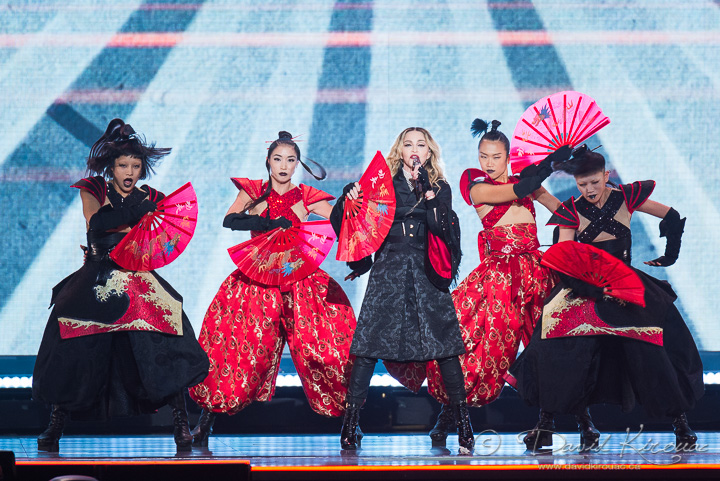
Madonna and her dancers perform the track on the Rebel Heart Tour, displaying the Geisha-inspired costumes and the Japanese war fans.

Madonna performed "Bitch I'm Madonna" during her appearance on The Tonight Show Starring Jimmy Fallon on April 9, 2015. She adorned herself in a black jacket covered with gold dollar symbols and a number of gold chains around her neck. The performance began with Madonna in the backstage where she put finishing touches to her make-up, then entered Diplo's dressing room where he was having a party surrounded by women. Madonna did a dance routine in the hallway where her son Rocco appeared mouthing the chorus. The singer and her troupe then moved into the studio area where the audience was present. Energetic dancing continued with Madonna straddling one member of the audience at one point. Still photos of Minaj were projected on video screens with Diplo DJing on a console. Madonna also climbed atop Fallon's desk and made him sing the chorus line. The performance ended with another energetic dance routine and crumping.

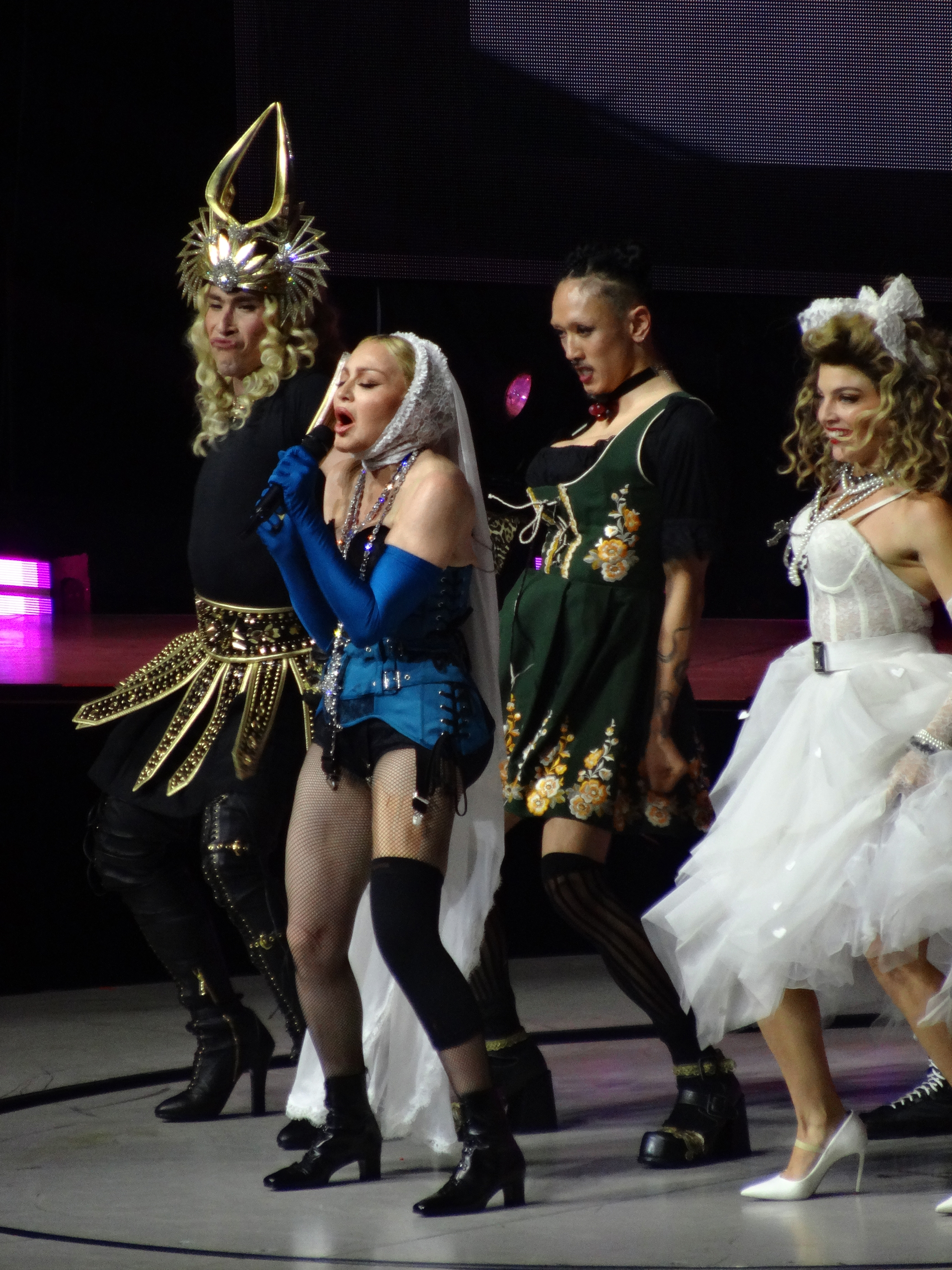
The medley performance of "Bitch I'm Madonna" and "Celebration" (2009) on the Celebration Tour, showing Madonna surrounded by dancers dressed like her.

The Hollywood Reporter listed the performance as one of the top five shocking moments by Madonna in 2015. Stereogum's Caitlin White was amazed by Madonna's performance, saying that "the fact that she can dance like ... this at 56 is practically a superhuman feat, and I was surprised by how much I enjoyed the performance." Bradley Stern also wrote a similar review for MuuMuse, describing the performance as "one of the most all-out insane television performances of the entire Rebel Heart era ... This was no basic stage performance: Instead, Madonna brought her noisy, bratty and utterly #Unapologetic banger to life."

On the Rebel Heart Tour (2015–16), the song was the second performance on the set list, during the first segment. For the first section, inspired by the Rebel Heart album cover art and Joan of Arc, costume designer Arianne Phillips had created a series of costumes referencing liturgical fabrics and a contemporary exhibition of samurai armor at the Los Angeles County Museum of Art. As the theatrical performance of opening number "Iconic" concluded, Madonna was joined onstage by her female dancers wearing geisha-inspired costumes. They started performing the song while holding Japanese war fans. Minaj appeared on the backdrops rapping her verses, aided by "shuddering" bass sounds. The performance of the song at the March 19–20, 2016 shows in Sydney's Allphones Arena was recorded and released in Madonna's fifth live album, Rebel Heart Tour. On December 6, 2016, Madonna performed the song during the Carpool Karaoke segment of The Late Late Show with James Corden.

A medley of "Bitch I'm Madonna" and "Celebration" (2009) was the closing number of the Celebration Tour (2023–24). It found the singer surrounded by dancers dressed like her throughout time, included a tribute to Michael Jackson and photos of "fairly random dead icons, crowing 'Bitch I’m Madonna' over and over". The performance ended with Madonna and the dancers hugging each other. Kate Solomon from British newspaper i pointed out that, "the energy was so intense it felt like a riot could break out at any second".

== Track listing ==
Digital download / streaming

1. "Bitch I'm Madonna" (featuring Nicki Minaj) – 3:47

Digital download / streaming – Clean version

1. "B**** I'm Madonna" (featuring Nicki Minaj) – 3:47

Digital download / streaming – Remixes

1. "Bitch I'm Madonna" (Fedde le Grand remix) – 3:55
2. "Bitch I'm Madonna" (Rosabel's Bitch Move mix) – 7:05
3. "Bitch I'm Madonna" (Sander Kleinenberg remix) – 4:58
4. "Bitch I'm Madonna" (Junior Sanchez remix) – 5:10
5. "Bitch I'm Madonna" (Oscar G 305 dub) – 8:44
6. "Bitch I'm Madonna" (Sick Individuals remix) – 5:07
7. "Bitch I'm Madonna" (Dirty Pop remix) – 5:11
8. "Bitch I'm Madonna" (Flechette remix) – 3:21
9. "Bitch I'm Madonna" (Oscar G Bitch Beats) – 8:44
10. "Bitch I'm Madonna" (Rosabel's Bitch Move dub) – 7:35

== Credits and personnel ==
Personnel adapted from Madonna's official website.

=== Management ===
- Webo Girl Publishing, Inc. (ASCAP) / Songs Music Publishing, LLC on behalf of "I Like Turtles" Music
- Songs of SMP (ASCAP) / Lion of God Publishing Co. (ASCAP) c/o Kobalt Songs Music Publishing / EMI April Music, Inc. and MoZella Mo Music (ASCAP) / Atlas Music Publishing on behalf of itself and Gadfly Songs (ASCAP)
- Songs of Universal, Inc. (BMI) on behalf of itself and Harajuku Barbie Music (BMI) / Brill Building Songs (ASCAP) c/o Kobalt Songs Music Publishing
- Nicki Minaj appears courtesy of Young Money Entertainment / Cash Money Records

=== Personnel ===
- Madonna – vocals, songwriter, producer
- Diplo – songwriter, producer
- Nicki Minaj – songwriter, guest vocals
- Sophie – songwriter, co-producer
- MoZella – songwriter
- Toby Gad – songwriter
- Ariel Rechtshaid – songwriter
- Demacio "Demo" Castellon – engineer, mixer, recording
- Nick Rowe – engineer
- Aubrey "Big Juice" Delaine – engineer
- Zeke Mishanec – additional recording
- Angie Teo – additional mixing

== Charts ==
=== Weekly charts ===
Weekly chart performance for "Bitch I'm Madonna"
Chart (2014–15)	Peak position
Australia (ARIA)	132
Belgium (Ultratip Bubbling Under Flanders)	50
Canada Hot 100 (Billboard)	58
CIS Airplay (TopHit)	199
Finland Download (Latauslista)	13
France (SNEP)	90
Hungary (Single Top 40)	21
Italy (Musica e dischi)	45
Spain (Promusicae)	49
Sweden (DigiListan)	30
US Billboard Hot 100	84
US Dance Club Songs (Billboard)	1
US Hot Dance/Electronic Songs (Billboard)	5

=== Year-end charts ===
Year-end chart performance for "Bitch I'm Madonna"
Chart (2015)	Position
US Dance Club Songs (Billboard)	8
US Hot Dance/Electronic Songs (Billboard)	29

== Certifications and sales ==
Certifications and sales for "Bitch I'm Madonna"
Region	Certification	Certified units/sales
Brazil (Pro-Música Brasil)	2× Platinum	120,000^{‡}
Poland (ZPAV)	Gold	10,000^{*}
United States	—	51,000
^{*} Sales figures based on certification alone.^{‡} Sales+streaming figures based on certification alone.

== Release history ==
Release dates and formats for "Bitch I'm Madonna"
Region(s)	Date	Format(s)	Version	Label	Ref.
Europe; Japan; Oceania	June 15, 2015	Digital download; streaming	Remixes	Interscope	
Canada	June 16, 2015	Digital download; streaming	Remixes	Interscope	
United States	June 16, 2015	Digital download; streaming	Remixes	Interscope	
France	June 18, 2015	Radio airplay	Original	Universal	

== See also ==
- Artists with the most number-ones on the U.S. Dance Club Songs chart
- List of Billboard Dance Club Songs number ones of 2015
