= Fly Again (song) =

Single by Kristine W

from the album Fly Again
- Released: 2003
- Genre: Dance
- Label: Tommy Boy
- Songwriter(s): Kristine Weitz; Jesse Houk

Kristine W singles chronology
"Some Lovin'" (2003)	"Fly Again" (2003)	"Save My Soul" (2004)

"Fly Again" was American dance-pop singer Kristine W's seventh single release and seventh consecutive number-one Billboard Hot Dance Club Play hit. This song served as the first single from her third official album, Fly Again.

== Music video ==
The music video "Fly Again" was directed by Mike Ruiz and produced by Jeff Beasley.

== See also ==
- List of Billboard number-one dance singles of 2003
