= The Wonder of It All (song) =

Single by Kristine W

from the album Fly Again
- Released: 2004
- Genre: Dance
- Label: Tommy Boy
- Songwriters: Kristine Weitz, Eran Tabib, Gabriel Dorman

Kristine W singles chronology
"Save My Soul" (2004)	"The Wonder of It All" (2004)	"I'll Be Your Light" (2006)

"The Wonder of It All" is a single by the American dance-pop singer Kristine W. It was released as a single on January 22, 2005, and it marked the singer's ninth consecutive #1 hit on the Billboard Hot Dance Club Play chart out of nine singles released to the dance clubs and radio. It can be found on her third studio album, Fly Again.

== Chart positions ==
Chart (2005)	Peak position
U.S. Billboard Hot Dance Club Play	1

== See also ==
- List of Billboard number-one dance singles of 2005
