= I'll Be Your Light =

Single by Kristine W

from the album Fly Again
- Released: 2004
- Label: Tommy Boy
- Songwriter(s): John DeNicola, Jack D. Elliott, Patty Maloney

Kristine W singles chronology
| "The Wonder of It All" (2005) | "I'll Be Your Light" (2004) | "Walk Away" (2007) |

"I'll Be Your Light" served as the fourth and final single from Kristine W's third official album, Fly Again. This song also ended her string of consecutive number one Billboard Dance singles when it peaked at number two on the chart dated February 25, 2006.

== Chart performance ==
- U.S. Hot Dance Club Play: #2
- U.S. Hot Dance Airplay: #17
