= Save My Soul (Kristine W song) =

Single by Kristine W

from the album Fly Again
- Released: 2004
- Genre: Dance
- Length: 4:07
- Label: Tommy Boy
- Songwriter(s): Niklas Pettersson; Mikael Alfredsson

Kristine W singles chronology
"Fly Again" (2003)	"Save My Soul" (2004)	"The Wonder of It All" (2005)

"Save My Soul" is a 2004 single by the American dance singer Kristine W. It was released as the second single from her album Fly Again. In April 2004, "Save My Soul" was Kristine W's eighth consecutive number-one song on the Billboard Hot Dance Club Play chart, which broke a previous record for consecutive number ones on this chart held by Madonna and Janet Jackson. The song was a featured single at the White Party in Palm Springs, California, in April 2005.

The swing group Big Bad Voodoo Daddy covered the song for their album Save My Soul.

== Remixes ==
- Save My Soul (Gabriel and Dresden remix) 09:49
- Save My Soul (Cypher UK Mix) 7:36
- Save My Soul (Junior Vasquez's Sound Factory Mix) 6:47
- Save My Soul (Mike Cruz Club Mix) 8:16
- Save My Soul (Orange Factory Extended Mix) 6:32

== See also ==
- List of Billboard number-one dance singles of 2004
