= Jason Walker (American musician) =

American singer and songwriter

Jason Walker is an American singer and songwriter whose work includes mostly dance and house music, especially popular among the gay club scene, but also includes pop, soul and R&B influences. Walker has released several studio albums, and 12 of his singles have charted on Billboard's Dance Club Songs, including five, "Foolish Mind Games" (2004), "Set It Free" (2005), "So Happy" (2016), "Say Yes" (2016), and "I'm In Love With You", which reached number one on the chart.

== Early life and education ==
Walker grew up in Canonsburg, Pennsylvania, south of Pittsburgh. He started singing from the age of four. His interest in music developed while singing in church choirs, and he also performed in local R&B bands.

== Career ==
In 2001, Jason Walker first gained national recognition when he appeared on the television competition show It's Showtime at the Apollo. He won by performing a rendition of Oleta Adams's cover of "Get Here".

Walker then began working with record producer and DJ Junior Vasquez. Together, they began releasing a series of singles. In May 2004, a song by Vasquez featuring Walker, "My Life", peaked at number three on the Billboard's Dance Club Songs chart, following its debut on the chart nine weeks earlier. Later that year, Walker released his own single, "Foolish Mind Games", which appeared in the Dance Club Songs chart in the mid-2004 and peaked at number one on the chart on September 25, 2004.

Walker's first studio album, This Is My Life, was released under Vasquez's JVM label in 2005. Both of the earlier singles, "My Life" and "Foolish Mind Games", were included in the album. In May 2005, another single from the album, "Set It Free", became Walker's second single to reach number one on the Dance Club Songs chart. Vasquez introduced Walker to Tony Moran when Vasquez commissioned a remix of "Set It Free" by Moran. Moran and Walker would later continue collaborating to produce several Billboard-charting songs.

"No More", a fourth single from Walker's debut album, peaked at number five on the Dance Club chart in December 2005. "Movin' On", released as a song by Dynamix featuring Walker, was the fifth single from the album to appear on the Dance Club chart in July 2006, peaking at number seven on the chart the week of September 9, 2006.

In December 2007, Walker released his next album, Flexible, under Centaur Records. "I Can't Get You Off My Mind", the first track on the album, appeared on the Dance Club chart during the following year, peaking at number 27 in August 2008.

Walker independently released a pop album in August 2010 titled Leave It All Behind. While the album has a "clear focus on Gospel-inspired soul", the album's title track had a techno-inspired beat apparently intended for the dance club scene. The title track from the album peaked at number 15 on the Dance Club chart in October 2010.

In April 2014, Walker's single "Tell It To My Heart" featuring Bimbo Jones debuted at number 48 on the Dance Club Songs chart. The song peaked at number ten on the chart in June 2014.

Walker began collaborating regularly with Moran beginning with "So Happy" which peaked at number one of Dance Club Songs chart on June 4, 2016. The single featured Walker and was written by Moran and Chris Willis. On December 17, 2016, "Say Yes" became number one on Dance Club Songs. In August 2018, "I'm In Love With You" became Walker's fifth song at the top of the Dance Club Songs chart. This was his third collaboration with Moran to reach number one. A fourth collaboration with Moran, "Perfect Bitch", peaked at number two on the chart in 2019.

== Personal life ==
Walker lives in Brooklyn, New York, with his husband. They have a Great Dane.

== Discography ==
=== Albums ===
List of album with selected details
| Title | Album details |
|---|---|
| This Is My Life | Released: 2005; Label: JVM; Formats: CD |
| Flexible | Released: December 11, 2007; Label: Centaur Records; Formats: CD |
| Leave It All Behind | Released: August 24, 2010; Label: CD Baby / Jason Walker; Formats: CD |

=== Singles ===
==== Singles as lead artist ====
| Year | Single | Peak positions | Album |
| Year | Single | US Dance Club Songs | Album |
|---|---|---|---|
| 2004 | "Foolish Mind Games" | 1 | This Is My Life |
| 2005 | "Set It Free" | 1 | This Is My Life |
| 2005 | "No More" | 5 | This Is My Life |
| 2008 | "I Can't Get You Off My Mind" | 27 | Flexible |
| 2010 | "Leave It All Behind" | 15 | Leave It All Behind |
| 2014 | "Tell It To My Heart" (featuring Bimbo Jones) | 10 | |
| 2021 | "All To You" | — | |
| 2022 | "Dance A Little" | — | |
"—" denotes releases that did not chart

==== Guest singles ====
| Year | Single | Artist | Peak positions |
| Year | Single | Artist | US Dance Club Songs |
|---|---|---|---|
| 2004 | "My Life" | Junior Vasquez (featuring Jason Walker) | 3 |
| 2006 | "Movin' On" | Dynamix (featuring Jason Walker) | 7 |
| 2008 | "Can't Stop" | Quentin Harris (featuring Jason Walker) | — |
| 2010 | "Circles" | Quentin Harris (featuring Jason Walker) | — |
| 2012 | "Raise Your Hands" | C-Rod (featuring Jason Walker) | 15 |
| 2013 | "Beat Don't Stop" | C-Rod (featuring Jason Walker) | 5 |
| 2015 | "Wildjoy" | Temporary Hero (featuring Jason Walker) | — |
| 2016 | "That Feeling" | Martin EZ & Brian Boncher (featuring Jason Walker) | — |
| 2016 | "So Happy" | Tony Moran (featuring Jason Walker) | 1 |
| 2016 | "Say Yes" | Tony Moran (featuring Jason Walker) | 1 |
| 2017 | "I'm In Love With You" | Tony Moran (featuring Jason Walker) | 1 |
| 2017 | "Sunrise" | Kygo (featuring Jason Walker) | |
| 2019 | "Perfect Bitch" | Tony Moran (featuring Jason Walker) | 2 |
| 2020 | "Stronger" | Quentin Harris (featuring Jason Walker) | — |
| 2021 | "Where Love Lives" | John "J-C" Carr (featuring Jason Walker) | — |
"—" denotes releases that did not chart
