= Free People (song) =

Single by Tony Moran featuring Martha Wash
- Released: 2015
- Recorded: 2015
- Genre: Dance/house
- Length: 4:49
- Label: Radikal Records
- Songwriter(s): Tony Moran; Martha Wash
- Producer(s): Tony Moran

Tony Moran singles chronology
"Shine On 2012" (2012)	"Free People" (2015)

"Free People" is a single released in 2015 recorded by Tony Moran featuring Martha Wash. It is the second number one collaboration between the two artists since 2008's "Keep Your Body Working."

== Background ==
The song lyrics details how people of all walks of life can use their freedom through the power of motivation and self-expression. In an interview with Billboard Moran explained that "Whether as a child or adult, teenager or senior citizen, struggling to understand how to achieve their dreams and goals, how to be accepted in a particular situation or environment, how to be loved by those you only dream of loving you was the inspiration," adding that "All things are possible if you can love yourself. Dance empowers you to travel to places where love is endless, acceptance is ensured and you are 'Free' to be anyone you want to be."

== Track listing ==
=== iTunes listing [Volume 1] ===
1. Free People (Tony Moran & Warren Rigg Radio Edit) 4:49
2. Free People (Giuseppe D. Remix Edit) 3:18
3. Free People (Cruelty Remix Edit) 4:25
4. Free People (Tony Moran & Warren Rigg Global Mix) 7:41
5. Free People (Victor Dinaire & Bissen Remix) 7:37
6. Free People (Giuseppe D. Remix) 6:31
7. Free People (Antony Reale & Funky Junction Vocal Mix) 7:01
8. Free People (Cruelty Remix) 5:48
9. Free People (Splashfunk, Laera & Funky Junction Remix) 6:00
10. Free People (Yinon Yahel Remix) 6:11
11. Free People (The Noise Makers Remix - Funky Junction & Antony Reale Re Edit) 5:36
12. Free People (Rene Ablaze Remix) 7:49

=== iTunes listing [Volume 2] ===
1. Free People (Victor Dinaire & Bissen Radio Edit) 3:33
2. Free People (Rene Ablaze Remix Edit) 3:08
3. Free People (Yinon Yahel Radio Edit) 3:22
4. Free People (Ezio Centanni & Costantino "Mixmaster" Padovano Classic House Remix) 8:11
5. Free People (Dani Toro Remix) 6:52
6. Free People (John LePage & Brian Cua Club Remix) 7:09
7. Free People (Sergio Matina & Gabry Sangineto TendenziA Remix) 7:30
8. Free People (Casey Alva Club Vocal) 6:24
9. Free People (Mauro Rizzo & Funky Junction Remix) 8:54
10. Free People (Tony Moran & Warren Rigg Instrumental Dub Mix) 6:45
11. Free People (DJ Head Mix) 8:16
12. Free People (Victor Dinaire & Bissen Instrumental) 7:37
