= This Is It (Michael Jackson song) =

Promotional single by Michael Jackson

from the album Michael Jackson's This Is It
- Released: October 12, 2009
- Recorded: 1980 (original); 2009 (reworked)
- Studio: Paul Anka's home studio (Carmel) (original); Marvin's Room (Los Angeles) (reworked)
- Genre: Pop
- Length: 3:37 (album version); 4:55 (orchestra version); 3:43 (single version)
- Label: Epic
- Songwriters: Michael Jackson; Paul Anka
- Producers: Michael Jackson; John McClain; Mervyn Warren

Audio sample
- "This Is It": file; help

"This Is It" is a song co-written by American singer-songwriter Michael Jackson and Canadian singer-songwriter Paul Anka. The song was recorded by Jackson and featured on the album This Is It, which accompanied the 2009 concert documentary Michael Jackson's This Is It.

It was premiered worldwide on Jackson's official website on October 12, 2009, four months after his death on June 25, 2009. Although Sony Music Entertainment referred to the song as a "new single" during its promotion, it was later confirmed that the song would only be sent for airplay, and not be available to buy as a single release. According to Anka, the song was recorded in 1980 and intended to be a duet between him and Jackson on Anka's Walk a Fine Line album under the title "I Never Heard", but these plans fell through. Thereafter, Sa-Fire recorded the track for her album, I Wasn't Born Yesterday (1991). The duet version of the song was featured in Anka's 2013 Duets album. While putting together the This Is It album, Jackson's demo version of the song was found. His brothers' vocals and additional instrumentation were then added to the recording.

A pop ballad, the instrumentation includes piano, guitar, percussion, and strings. Jackson's version, styled as a pop ballad, was his first song to chart on Billboard's Hot Adult Contemporary Chart in over seventeen years. The song was generally well received by critics and enjoyed good chart performances globally. It became a top twenty hit on charts in Japan and Spain, and peaked at number 18 on both Billboard's US Adult Contemporary and R&B/Hip-Hop song charts. In 2011, it received a Grammy Award nomination. The song was also accompanied by a music video, directed by Spike Lee, which consisted of footage of Jackson as a child, clips of him throughout his career, and footage of tributes from Jackson's fans around the world.

== Background ==
Although it shared its name, the song was not intentionally made for the 2009 concert documentary Michael Jackson's This Is It. "This Is It" was written by recording artists Michael Jackson and Paul Anka, and a demo version of the song was recorded by Jackson and Anka in 1980 at Anka's California recording studio. The song was intended to be added as an album track on Anka's same year duets album Walk a Fine Line that he was in the process of recording at the time.

Soon after the alleged theft in the '80s, Anka threatened to take legal action if the recordings were not returned. Jackson's version of "This Is It" was reportedly found in a box of tapes with only Jackson's voice and a piano accompaniment, the song was described as having been a "bare-bone" recording. Jackson subsequently returned the tapes, although Anka insisted that Jackson had made a copy of the recordings of "I Never Heard" and retitled the track with his voice to "This Is It". In 1990, Anka allowed the Puerto Rican R&B recording artist Sa-Fire to record "This Is It", which she did under the original title "I Never Heard" on her second studio album I Wasn't Born Yesterday in 1991.

== Release ==
On September 13, 2009, it was reported that a "secret Michael Jackson single" was being produced to promote the film Michael Jackson's This Is It, so that the song's release would coincide with the release of the film. It was shelved until producers in Los Angeles, California decided to remix the vocals with an orchestral accompaniment. On September 23, Sony Music Entertainment announced they were planning on releasing a song entitled, "This Is It" as a single. The song was to feature backing vocals by several of Jackson's brothers and would be included in a two-disc album, This Is It. It was also confirmed that the song would be featured during the end credits of the movie production. Sony said, in response to the reports, that it was a coincidence that his upcoming concert series was also titled "This Is It", explaining they had no evidence that he had planned to release the song. However, John McClain and John Branca, two representatives of Jackson's estate said, in a prepared statement, that "This Is It" was "picked because the lyrics were appropriate because of the name Michael [Jackson] gave his tour" and that they were "thrilled to present" the song.

Although Sony did not release the track as a single, it was confirmed that "This Is It" would be released to radio stations for airplay, but that it would not be downloadable. Sony chose to release the song as an album-only track as part of a strategy to encourage fans to buy the entire album. McClain, also a co-producer of the This Is It album said, "This song only defines, once again, what the world already knows—that Michael [Jackson] is one of God's greatest gifts." "This Is It" premiered, as scheduled, on Jackson's official website MichaelJackson.com on October 12 at midnight.

Within the day of the song's release, via World Wide Web, listeners, unaware of the song's background, drew comparisons of the song to Sa-Fire's "I Never Heard". Soon after, media outlets The New York Times and TMZ.com informed Anka of the similarities between the songs. In response, Anka told the New York Times, that "This Is It" was "exactly the same song" as "I Never Heard" and only the titles were different. He also stated that he was planning on taking legal action against Jackson's estate. Soon afterwards, Jackson's estate acknowledged that Anka was a co-writer on the song and agreed that Anka would receive 50 percent of the publishing rights from it. Anka said the estate "did the right thing", and that he felt that he did not think "that anybody tried to do the wrong thing" and it was "an honest mistake". Anka further stated "They realize it's a mistake, they realize it's my song, they realize it's my production of his vocal in my studio and I am getting 50 percent of the whole project, actually, which is fair".

Rob Stringer, the chairman of the Epic Label Group, stated that at the time of the song's release he did not know when Jackson's original tape had been recorded or of its similarity to Sa-Fire's version until it was discussed online over the weekend by Jackson's fans. Prior to the estate and Anka reaching an agreement, Sa-Fire's manager, Sal Abbatiello, stated that he was contemplating filing a lawsuit on behalf of his client, commenting, "This is a terrible mistake [...] I'm pretty sure Paul Anka has a big case. I don't know if Sa-Fire has any legal right as the artist. I'll have to contact my lawyers. But, hopefully. They're advertising this movie everywhere." Abbatiello also criticized Sony for not researching the possibility that the song might have had been previously released before releasing it.

== Composition ==
"This Is It" is a pop ballad with a simple mid-tempo keyboard that lasts three minutes and 36 seconds. The song begins with Jackson singing, "This is it, here I stand / I'm the light of the world, I feel grand / Got this love I can feel / And I know yes for sure it is real" and then he tenderly hits his signature high notes about a new lover he feels he's known "since 1,000 years". Jackson's brothers Jackie, Tito, Jermaine, Marlon and Randy (credited as The Jacksons) are featured as background vocals throughout the song. Background music includes fingersnaps, a "soaring chorus", big-build strings and "bubbly guitars". The song is played in the key of Bb major. Throughout the song, Jackson's vocal range spans from F_{3} to C_{5}. The song's tempo is moderate, and its metronome speed is 96 beats per minute. According to the music published on Musicnotes.com by Alfred Music Publishing and the Winnipeg Sun, the song is written in common time. The lyrics "toggle between grandiosity" ("This is it, here I stand / I'm the light of the world, I feel grand") and "shy, romantic yearning" ("I never heard a single word about you / Falling in love wasn't my plan"). Darrly Sterdan of the Winnipeg Sun felt that Jackson's voice and the background music sounded "like a demo that's been fleshed out with overdubs and doowoppy backup vocals from his brothers." Anthony McCartney, of the Associated Press felt that the finger-snap percussion "echoes" that present in Jackson's 1982 song "The Girl Is Mine" with Paul McCartney.

== Critical reception ==
The track gained average-to-positive reviews and a nomination for Best Male Pop Vocal Performance at the 2011 53rd Grammy Awards. Gary Trust of Billboard reported that "response among radio programmers to the song has been almost universally positive." Among these were Jay Lustig of The Star-Ledger, who felt it was a "sweet, mid-tempo love song" that, with "orchestral strings" and "creamy backing vocals" by Jackson's brothers, gave it a "crisp beat". In contrast, Darryl Sterdan of The Winnipeg Sun gave it a 3 out of 5 rating, saying, "This may be something, but it's not 'It'... On the whole, it's a sweet little number—but it doesn't live up to its authoritative title." Todd Martens, of the Los Angeles Times's Pop & Hiss music blog, called "This Is It" a "trifle" and while the track "certainly won't embarrass Jackson's legacy or break the hearts of fans eager to hear Jackson's voice again" it does "bring the fallen pop icon a little back down to earth." Jessica Robertson, an AOL music editor, said, "It's a safe, mid-tempo pop ballad that features what his fans love: his trademark breathy vocals and confident delivery. I don't think it will set the world on fire, because it's missing what fans and critics love most about his songs, which is a strong and powerful groove to carry it."

Many reviewers noted similarities in the song to earlier Jackson songs. Caryn Ganz of Rolling Stone felt musically, "This Is It" sounded similar to Jackson's 1987 song "I Just Can't Stop Loving You", and Leah Greenbatt, of Entertainment Weekly thought "some listeners may pick up shades" of Jackson's 1993 single "Will You Be There". Cori Murray, an entertainment director at Essence magazine, described the track as "not bad", and felt that it sounded "like something" Jackson "could have put on an album". Dan Aquilante, of the New York Post, described the song as "an optimistic, R&B ballad with an upbeat, percolating rhythm that has all the bombast and power of the New Jack Swing period of the early '90s". James Montgomery, of MTV News, felt that the song was the "perfect MJ tune" and that Jackson "was a hell of a singer". He also stated that he felt that Jackson had a "wonderous voice", and the song "a prime showcase for Jackson's prodigious pipes". Montgomery went on to say that when he ignored the negative elements surrounding the song and focused, that he felt it was "wonderful":

Ignore the trilling strings, and the soft-jazz/light-funk backing track (which sort of make[s] the song sound like Off the Wall's "I Can't Help It"). Block out the hype surrounding the song's release and the drama surrounding Jackson's death. Focus on those vocals—the way Jackson counts it in with a boyish "one, two, three, four," the way he glides from verse to verse with breathless, effortless phrasing, the lean-yet-heavy falsetto, the hint of gravel (and gravitas) is the verses, the soaring choruses—it's all there, untarnished by time or tabloids. And it's all wonderful.

== Chart performance ==
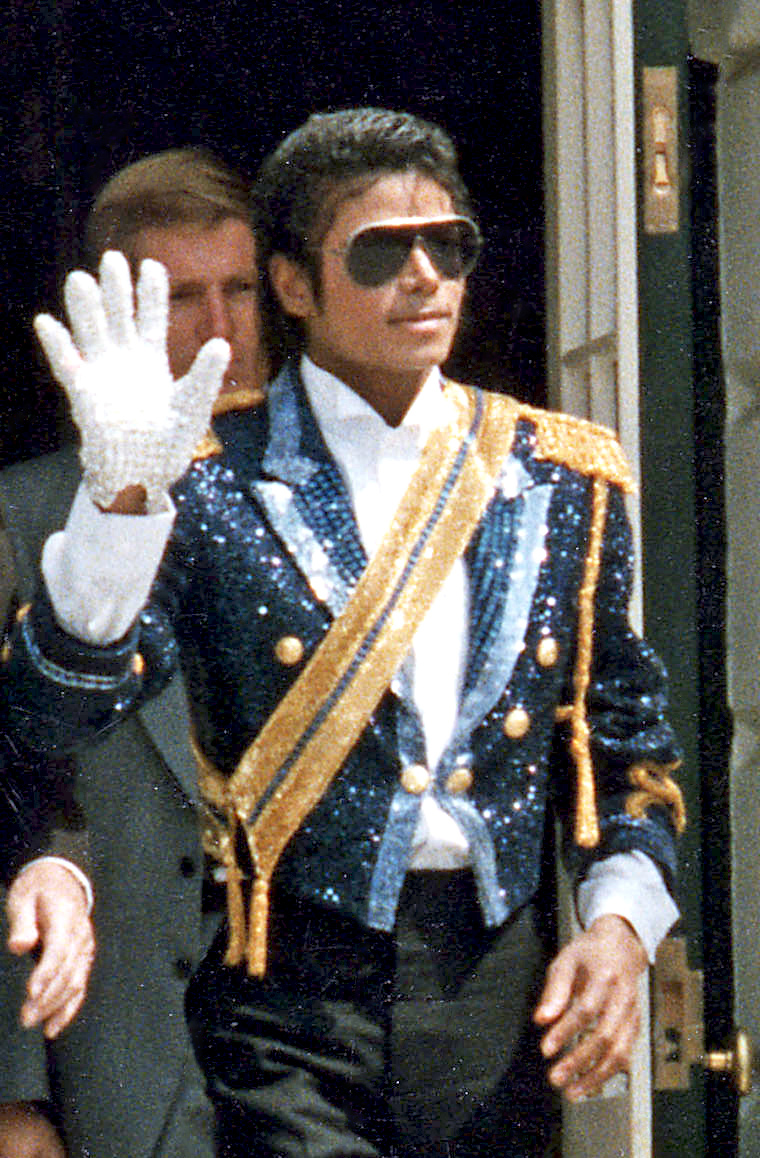
"This Is It" gave Jackson his first song to chart on Billboard's Hot Adult Contemporary Tracks in over 17 years.

Despite being a non-downloadable album track, the song appeared on many charts due to radio play alone. Gary Trust of Billboard acknowledged that without "This Is It" having a digital (distribution) component its chances on making an impact on the Billboard Hot 100 would not be likely. During the week ending October 21, 2009, "This Is It" debuted at number 19 on Billboard's Hot Adult Contemporary Tracks. "This Is It" returned Jackson and his brothers to the chart for the first time since 1970, when, billed as The Jackson 5, the group marked its sole previous entry, "I'll Be There", which went on to peak on the chart at number 24. Its charting ended a 13-year, seven-month absence Jackson had from the chart; his prior entry was "You Are Not Alone", which wrapped a 26-week run on the list dated March 16, 1996. This song is also Jackson's 26th charted Adult Contemporary title, making him the seventh male artist to score a top 20 Adult Contemporary single in each decade since the 1970s. Eventually, the track peaked at number 18 on the Adult Contemporary chart. Also in "This Is It"'s first week of release, the song debuted on Billboard's Hot R&B/Hip-Hop Songs Chart at number 43. "This Is It" went on to peak at number 18 on the R&B/Hip-Hop Song-genre chart. "This Is It" also charted on the Adult R&B Songs chart, peaking at number 9.

"This Is It"'s most successful charting country was Japan, where the song placed within the top ten, peaking at number five on Japan's Hot 100 chart. Also, it peaked at number 30 on the Slovak airplay chart, at number 22 on the Dutch singles chart, and at number 27 on the Czech airplay chart. The song peaked on the Canadian Hot 100 chart at number 56 but was quite successful in Spain: The track peaked at number 18 on the Spanish singles chart. According to Billboard, within the first 24 hours of release the song had over 800 radio plays in Europe. Another commercially successful territory for "This Is It" was China. It debuted at number one in Hit FM, China Radio International's western music radio's airplay charts, "Top 20 Countdown" on October 24, 2009. It held the top position for four consecutive weeks until Beyoncé Knowles's "Broken-Hearted Girl" superseded it on November 21. However, the track bounced back to the top position of the chart on November 28.

== Music video ==
On December 27, 2009, the song's official music video was released. It was directed by Academy Award-nominee Spike Lee, who had previously worked with Jackson directing the video for "They Don't Care About Us" for his HIStory: Past, Present and Future, Book I (1995) album. The video for "This Is It" premiered on the webpage of Lee's production company 40 Acres & A Mule Filmworks. The video, almost five-minutes long, features various scenes of Jackson's hometown and former residence in Gary, Indiana, along with photos and videos of him and tributes from his fans around the world.

This sign (pictured) was shown several times throughout the video, a reference to the public's negativity towards Jackson because of the controversies during his life.

The video opens with a clip of a poster in Gary pointing fans toward Jackson's childhood home, at the corner of 2300 Jackson Street and Jackson Family Boulevard and the sound of a vintage recording of one of Jackson's siblings yelling "Michael" repeatedly. An image, that is shown several times during the video, shows a one-way traffic sign near Jackson's old house that is covered in graffiti honoring Jackson, including "we luv yuh Michael". Images, shown as a slide-show, of Jackson performing as a child are mixed in with shots of play sets, baseball bats and Gary's gritty industrial skyline. A central image captured by Lee is a 'plea' for tolerance etched onto a stop sign in Gary, where someone had written the message "This Is It" above the word "Stop" under which they've added "hatin'". Interspersed is archival footage of Jackson throughout his career and of him greeting his fans in various parts of the world. There are also shots of the musician's fans paying tribute in their own Jackson memorabilia to him following his death. At one point in the video, one of the lyrics from the song, "I never heard a single word about you," floats up out of the concrete, fading into two more shots of fan tributes from around the world and multiple flowers and messages laid at the gates of Jackson's Neverland Ranch. The video, several times, shows a single red balloon floating in the air and empty swings swaying in the breeze. Towards the end of the video, there is footage of Jackson doing one of his signature dance moves, the moonwalk. It ends with footage of a black stool with Jackson's trademark black fedora and silver glove on top of it under a spotlight in front of his family's Gary residence at night.

George Merchan of JoBlo.com felt that the video was "clearly" a "loving patchwork of documentary footage, graphics, and original location shoots". Simon Vozick-Levinson of Entertainment Weekly described the video as being a "heart felt tribute" and said that, due to the circumstances of Lee having no footage of Jackson performing the song to work with, felt the director did a "very nice job" with it. A negative review came from Jim Farber, the music critic for the New York Daily News. He felt the video was a "mini retrospective" of Jackson's life and criticized the "Stop Hatin'" stop sign, feeling that it was promoting press censorship and discussion about the darker aspects of Jackson's life.

== Personnel ==
- Lyrics written by Michael Jackson. Music by Paul Anka
- Produced by Michael Jackson, John McClain and Mervyn Warren
- Lead vocals by Michael Jackson
- Vocal and track arrangements by Mervyn Warren
- String arrangement by Brent Fischer
- Background vocals by The Jacksons
- Bass vocals by Alvin Chea
- Piano by Greg Phillinganes and Paul Anka
- Guitar by Paul Jackson, Jr.
- Percussion by Raphael Padilla
- Recording engineer: Jon Nettlesbey
- Recorded at Marvin's Room in Hollywood, California
- Mixed by Allen Sides
- Assistant engineer: Wesley Seidman
- Mixed at Oceanway Coordination Studios
- Mastered by Alan Yoshida
- Mastered at Oceanway Mastering
- A&R direction: John Doelp
- Production coordination: JoAnn Tominaga
- Accounting services: Martha Rindels

== Charts ==
=== Weekly charts ===
Weekly chart performance for "This Is It"
Chart (2009)	Peak position
Canadian Hot 100	56
Czech Airplay Chart	27
Dutch Top 40 Chart	22
Hungary (Rádiós Top 40)	12
Iceland (RÚV)	1
Japan Hot 100	5
Slovak Airplay Chart	30
Spanish Singles Chart	18
Spanish Airplay Chart	17
US Bubbling Under Hot 100 (Billboard)	18
US Billboard Hot Adult Contemporary Tracks	18
US Billboard Hot R&B/Hip-Hop Songs	18

=== Year-end charts ===
Year-end chart performance for "This Is It"
Chart (2009)	Position
Hungarian Singles Chart	173
Japan Adult Contemporary (Billboard Japan)	55
Taiwan (Yearly Singles Top 100)	55

Chart (2010)	Position
Japan Adult Contemporary (Billboard Japan)	39

== See also ==
- List of unreleased songs recorded by Michael Jackson
- List of music released posthumously
- Death of Michael Jackson
