= Lola's Theme =

2004 single by Shapeshifters

Single by the Shapeshifters

from the album Sound Advice
- Released: 12 July 2004
- Genre: Dance; disco house
- Length: 5:37 (album version); 3:27 (radio edit)
- Label: Positiva; Nocturnal Groove
- Songwriters: Fulvio Perniola; Gianni Bini; Karen Poole; Max Reich; Patrick Moten; Simon Marlin
- Producer: The Shapeshifters

The Shapeshifters singles chronology
| "Lola's Theme" (2004) | "Back to Basics" (2005) |

"Lola's Theme" is a song by British house duo the Shapeshifters, featuring soul singer Cookie on vocals. It was released on 12 July 2004 as the lead single from the Shapeshifters' debut album, Sound Advice (2004). The song became the duo's biggest hit, peaking atop the UK Singles Chart and charting highly in Finland, Ireland, the Netherlands, and New Zealand. In Australia, it was the most successful club hit of 2004.

== Background ==
The name "Lola's Theme" was originally a working title for this record; Lola was Simon Marlin's wife, and it was while listening to her record collection that the initial idea for the track was conceived. She appears handing out candy floss in the music video.

"Lola's Theme" features a sample from the introduction of Johnnie Taylor's R&B hit of 1982, "What About My Love", and it was originally released at the end of 2003 on their own Nocturnal Groove label as a mostly instrumental track featuring a vocal sample taken from Anthony White's 1994 song "Love Me Tonight". "I basically took one phrase from Anthony White's ‘Love Me Tonight’ track from 1994 on Stress Records, twisted that phrase, cut it up, and made a completely new phrase out of it," Marlin told DJ Mag in 2023. "This was the bit that goes, 'I'm a different person / Turn my world around'. If you listen to the original Anthony White, you'll hear exactly the same words in a completely different way."

Due to its immense popularity, "Lola's Theme" was licensed from Nocturnal Groove to Positiva Records. At the same time, the sample of "What About My Love" was then completely replayed by Mark Summers at Scorccio Sample Replays, recreating all elements of the sample (strings, brass sections, piano, etc.). The duo then set about finding a vocalist. After a long search they met Cookie, a gospel singer from the London Community Gospel Choir, who recorded the vocals for the full release, as well as adding verses.

== Composition ==
The song is a house and dance-pop song, utilising elements of "What About My Love" by Johnnie Taylor and lyrics from "Love Me Tonight" by Anthony White. Lyrically, the song is written from the perspective of someone who for most of their life felt disillusioned and alienated. It is addressed to an unnamed other, presumably a love interest, who helped the singer to develop a more positive outlook on life.

== Release and chart performance ==
In the United Kingdom, "Lola's Theme" was released on 12 July 2004, and upon its release, it topped the UK Singles Chart. "Lola's Theme" also topped the American Dance Charts, peaking at number one on the Hot Dance Airplay chart in October 2004. The duo went on to have a further two Top 20 hits in the United Kingdom ("Back to Basics" and "Incredible") and now have a recording contract with Defected Records. "Lola's Theme" was nominated for "Best British Single" at the 2005 Brit Awards.

== Music video ==
The music video for "Lola's Theme" was filmed at George Irvin's Funfair in Kingsbury, London; some of the video was filmed at the Irvin's Hellraiser (or Waltzer), the Top Buzz and other rides. The Shapeshifters and Cookie appear in the video, as does remixer Norman Jay.

== Samples ==
In July 2024, British rapper ArrDee collaborated with the Shapeshifters, sampling "Lola's Theme" for his single "Different".

== Track listings ==
UK CD single

1. "Lola's Theme" (radio edit) – 3:25
2. "Lola's Theme" (main mix) – 8:11
3. "Lola's Theme" (extended vocal mix) – 6:54
4. "Lola's Theme" (Eric Prydz mix) – 8:02
5. "Lola's Theme" (Calderone vocal mix) – 10:26
6. "Lola's Theme" (enhanced video)

UK 12-inch single (blue cover)

A1. "Lola's Theme" (extended vocal mix) – 6:54
A2. "Lola's Theme" (Eric Prydz mix) – 8:02
AA1. "Lola's Theme" (main mix) – 8:11
AA2. "Lola's Theme" (alternative mix) – 6:48

UK 12-inch single (green cover)

A1. "Lola's Theme" (ATFC's Jive for Jezebel) – 9:48
AA1. "Lola's Theme" (Lola Does High Society vocal) – 6:58
AA2. "Lola's Theme" (Norman Jay's Good Times vocal mix) – 7:18

UK 12-inch single (clear vinyl)

A. "Lola's Theme" (main mix) – 8:11
AA. "Lola's Theme" (alternative mix) – 6:48

UK 12-inch single (Victor Calderone remixes)

A. "Lola's Theme" (Calderone vocal mix) – 10:26
B. "Lola's Theme" (Calderone dub mix) – 10:26

UK DVD single

1. "Lola's Theme" (radio edit audio) – 3:25
2. "Route One" (audio) – 6:42
3. "Lola's Theme" (alternative mix audio) – 6:54
4. DVD video and gallery

European CD single

1. "Lola's Theme" (radio edit) – 3:25
2. "Lola's Theme" (main mix) – 8:11

US 12-inch single

A1. "Lola's Theme" (Calderone vocal mix) – 10:26
B1. "Lola's Theme" (extended vocal mix) – 6:54
B2. "Lola's Theme" (Eric Prydz mix) – 8:02

Australian CD single

1. "Lola's Theme" (radio edit) – 3:25
2. "Lola's Theme" (main mix) – 8:11
3. "Lola's Theme" (extended vocal mix) – 6:54
4. "Lola's Theme" (Eric Prydz mix) – 8:02
5. "Lola's Theme" (Calderone vocal mix) – 10:26

== Charts ==
=== Weekly charts ===
| Chart (2004) | Peak position |
|---|---|
| Australia (ARIA) | 35 |
| Australian Club Chart (ARIA) | 1 |
| Austria (Ö3 Austria Top 40) | 47 |
| Belgium (Ultratop 50 Flanders) | 19 |
| Belgium (Ultratip Bubbling Under Wallonia) | 2 |
| Denmark (Tracklisten) | 17 |
| Europe (Eurochart Hot 100) | 5 |
| Finland (Suomen virallinen lista) | 9 |
| Germany (GfK) | 23 |
| Greece (IFPI) | 33 |
| Hungary (Dance Top 40) | 4 |
| Hungary (Editors' Choice Top 40) | 5 |
| Ireland (IRMA) | 7 |
| Ireland Dance (IRMA) | 1 |
| Italy (FIMI) | 18 |
| Netherlands (Dutch Top 40) | 13 |
| Netherlands (Single Top 100) | 18 |
| New Zealand (Recorded Music NZ) | 11 |
| Romania (Romanian Top 100) | 39 |
| Scottish Singles Sales (Official Charts) | 2 |
| Sweden (Sverigetopplistan) | 41 |
| Switzerland (Schweizer Hitparade) | 31 |
| UK Singles (Official Charts) | 1 |
| UK Dance (Official Charts) | 1 |
| US Dance Club Play (Billboard) | 5 |
| US Dance Radio Airplay (Billboard) | 1 |
| US Dance Singles Sales (Billboard) | 26 |

=== Year-end charts ===
| Chart (2004) | Position |
|---|---|
| Australian Club Chart (ARIA) | 1 |
| Netherlands (Dutch Top 40) | 60 |
| UK Singles (OCC) | 21 |
| US Dance Club Play (Billboard) | 42 |
| US Dance Radio Airplay (Billboard) | 6 |

== Certifications ==
| Region | Certification | Certified units/sales |
|---|---|---|
| New Zealand (RMNZ) | Platinum | 30,000^{‡} |
| United Kingdom (BPI) | 2× Platinum | 1,200,000^{‡} |
^{‡} Sales+streaming figures based on certification alone.

== Release history ==
| Region | Date | Format(s) | Label(s) | Ref. |
|---|---|---|---|---|
| United Kingdom | 12 July 2004 | CD | Positiva; Nocturnal Groove | |
| Australia | 9 August 2004 | CD | Positiva; Nocturnal Groove | |

== See also ==
- List of UK Singles Chart number ones of the 2000s
- List of number-one dance airplay hits of 2004 (U.S.)
