= Sa-Fire (album) =

Studio album by Sa-Fire
- Released: 1988
- Genre: Latin freestyle, pop
- Length: 60:13
- Label: Cutting/Mercury/PolyGram; 834 922
- Producer: Carlos Rodgers, Peter Schwartz, Andy "Panda" Tripoli, the Latin Rascals, Aldo Marin, Floyd Fisher, Maria Nocera, Marc Anthony, Angelo Cosme, David Harris, Ernie Lake

Sa-Fire chronology
Sa-Fire (1988)	I Wasn't Born Yesterday (1991)

Singles from Sa-Fire
- 1. "Boy, I've Been Told" Released: 1988; 2. "Love Is on Her Mind" Released: 1988; 3. "Thinking of You" Released: 1989; 4. "Gonna Make It" Released: 1989

Professional ratings
Review scores
Source	Rating
AllMusic	4.5/5 stars

Sa-Fire is the first studio album by pop artist Sa-Fire. It was released in 1988 on Mercury Records.

== Track listing ==
No.	Title	Writer(s)	Length
1.	"Boy, I've Been Told"	Marc Anthony	5:12
2.	"Love Is on Her Mind"	Andy "Panda" Tripoli, The Latin Rascals (aka Tony Moran & Albert Cabrera)	4:56
3.	"Thinking of You"	Sa-Fire, Russ DeSalvo, Billy Steele	4:50
4.	"I Wanna Make You Mine"	Jeff Mann, Marco Olivo, N. Perce	5:03
5.	"It's a Crime"	Floyd Fisher, Maria Nocera	4:43
6.	"You Said You Loved Me"	Anthony	4:41
7.	"Gonna Make It"	David Harris	4:56
8.	"Better Be the Only One"	Anthony, Ernie Lake, Carlos Rodgers	4:30
9.	"Together"	Jacqueline Bonnen, Carlos Rodgers	4:59
10.	"Love at First Sight"	Aldo Marin, Johan Brunkvist, Sa-Fire	4:29

US CD and Cassette Edition

No.	Title	Writer(s)	Length
11.	"Let Me Be the One" (12" Version)	Sa-Fire, Peter Schwartz	6:42
12.	"Let Me be the One (bonus beats)"		3:20

== Personnel ==
- Marc Anthony, La India, Jeff Mann, Carl West, Maria Nocera, Susan Didrichen, David Harris, Denise Baez, Gary Filadelfo, Jacqueline S. Bonnen, Lucia Greco, Mark Frazer, Lauren Zeid: Vocal Backing
- Mac Quayle, Tony Moran, John Brunkvist, Peter Schwartz, Allen Spears: Keyboards
- Albert Cabrera: Keyboards, Vocal Backing
- Russ DeSalvo: Guitars, All Instruments on track 3
- Tristan Avakian, Glenn Schick: Guitars
- Mike Theodore: Percussion
- Albert Cabrera: Percussion (Cymbals), Vocal Backing
- Aldo Marin: Drum Programming
- Carlos Rodgers: Drum Programming, Vocal Backing
- Steve Greenfield: Saxophone
- Peter Campell: Other Programming

== Charts ==
Album - Billboard (United States)

Year	Chart	Position
1988	The Billboard 200	79
1988	Top R&B/Hip-Hop Albums	84

Singles - Billboard (United States)

Year	Single	Chart	Position
1988	"Boy, I've Been Told"	Hot Dance Music/Club Play	13
1988	"Boy, I've Been Told"	Hot Dance Music/Maxi-Singles Sales	3
1988	"Boy, I've Been Told"	The Billboard Hot 100	48
1989	"Love Is on Her Mind"	Hot Dance Music/Club Play	29
1989	"Love Is on Her Mind"	Hot Dance Music/Maxi-Singles Sales	18
1989	"Thinking of You"	Adult Contemporary	4
1989	"Thinking of You"	Hot Dance Music/Maxi-Singles Sales	26
1989	"Thinking of You"	The Billboard Hot 100	12
1989	"Gonna Make It"	Hot Dance Music/Club Play	31
1989	"Gonna Make It"	Hot Dance Music/Maxi-Singles Sales	20
1989	"Gonna Make It"	The Billboard Hot 100	71
