= Norman Jay =

British DJ (born 1957)

Norman Jay MBE
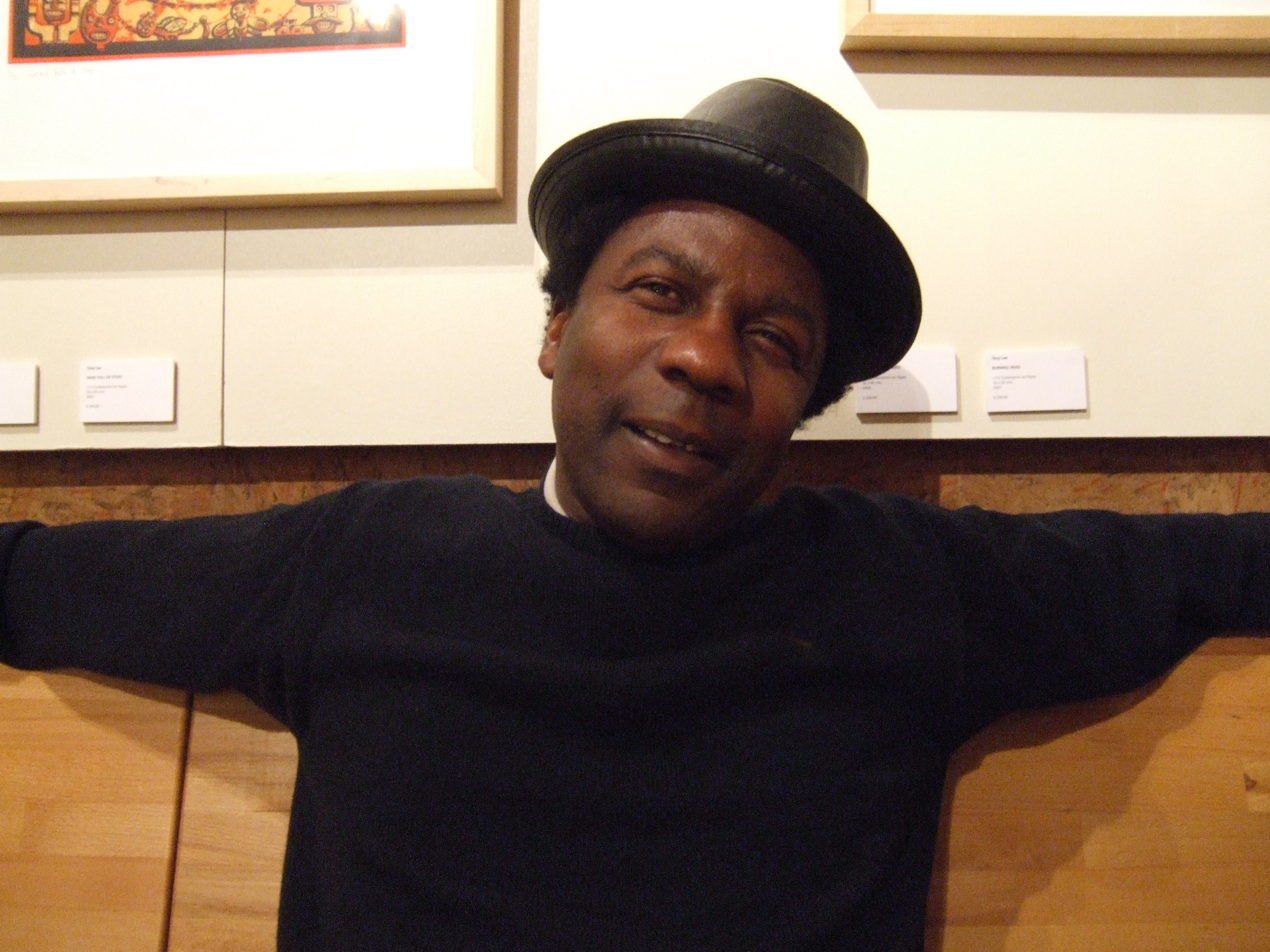

Background information
- Born: Norman Bernard Joseph; 6 November 1957 (age 68); Notting Hill, London, England
- Genres: Soul, disco, boogie, acid jazz, house
- Occupations: DJ, label owner, producer, remixer
- Website: www.normanjaymbe.com

Norman Bernard Joseph MBE (born on 6 November 1957), known by his stage name Norman Jay is a British club, radio and sound system DJ. He first came to prominence playing unlicensed "warehouse" parties in the early 1980s, and through his involvement with the then-pirate radio station Kiss FM. He is commonly attributed as having coined the phrase "rare groove".

He is a fan of Tottenham Hotspur football club.

In October 2019, he released his autobiography Mister Good Times.

== Background ==
Jay was born in Acton, London, to West Indian parents. He played his first gig aged eight at a 10th birthday party, influenced by his father's record collection of blue beat, ska and jazz. He soon "developed a love for anything soulful – particularly the sounds of black America".

== Music career ==
=== Sound system ===
In the early 1970s, Jay set-up a sound system with his brother Joey Jay, originally called "Great Tribulation". Following a trip to New York City in 1979, he decided to take this in a more serious direction. In 1980, it was renamed to "Good Times" after the Chic track, and made its Notting Hill Carnival debut. Good Times was seen as "pioneering" at this time for introducing soul and disco music into a Carnival set, despite some opposition in the early days. The sound system became a notable destination at Carnival for the next 30 years, with it located on the corner of West Row and Southern Row, Ladbroke Grove since 1991. Since the 1990s, the sound system has been hosted from its London Transport bus. In 2014, due to regeneration in the area, Good Times lost its original spot and has not appeared at Carnival since 2013. Instead, Good Times has hosted its sound system at events and nights around the country.

=== Radio ===
Jay established himself through being a founding member of the London pirate radio station Kiss FM in October 1985, on which he presented shows alongside its founders Gordon Mac and George Power. As a pirate, it was his "The Original Rare Groove Show" that led to the coining of the phrase "rare groove". When Kiss 100 was launched legally in September 1990, Jay hosted the first of what would become his "Musiquarium" shows. He left the station in October 1993.

In April 1997, Jay joined BBC London with a radio show named "Giant 45". The show broadcast until February 2008.

Throughout 2006 and 2007, Jay presented a series called "The Funk Factory" on BBC Radio 2.

More recently, he has hosted regular shows on Soho Radio.

=== Warehouse parties and club nights ===
In addition to appearing on radio, Jay was involved in hosting the sound system at illegal warehouse parties in venues across London, under the name "Shake 'n' Fingerpop".

Jay co-founded the first Paradise Garage-style club in Britain – "High on Hope", at Dingwalls in Camden. Between 1989 and 1994, he also ran a night at the Bass Clef in Hoxton.

In addition, he was a regular in the early 2000s at The Big Chill festival.

=== Record labels and productions ===
Jay established the Talkin' Loud record label with its founder DJ Gilles Peterson in 1990, spearheading the acid jazz scene.

In 2000, he released the first of five compilation albums called Good Times, in conjunction with the sound system. This led to a number of other 'spin-off' compilations.

He remixed the 2004 track "Lola's Theme" by the Shapeshifters, and featured in its video.

== Discography ==
=== Compilation albums ===
- Good Times (Nuphonic, 2000)
- Good Times 2 (Nuphonic, 2001)
- Good Times 3 (React, 2003)
- Good Times 4 (Resist, 2004)
- Good Times 5 (Resist, 2005)
- Giant 45 (React, 2004)
- Skank & Boogie (Sunday Best, 2015)
- Mister Good Times (Sunday Best, 2017)

=== Singles ===
- "Message in a Dream" (High on Hope Records, 1996) – affiliated to Resolution Records

=== Notable remixes ===
- Azzido Da Bass – "Dooms Night" (Club Tools, 2000)
- Los Jugaderos – "What You Doing to This Girl" (Junior Boy's Own, 2003)
- The Shapeshifters – "Lola's Theme" (Positiva Records, 2004)

=== Notable mixes ===
- Journeys by DJ – Desert Island Mix (with Gilles Peterson) (Journeys by DJ, 1997)
- Miss Moneypenny's Presents... – Norman Jay (Miss Moneypenny's Music, 1999)
- BBC Radio 1 – Essential Mix (BBC, 1994/1999/2000)

== Honours ==
Jay was awarded an MBE for services to music in 2002.
