= Incredible =

Incredible may refer to:

== Music ==
=== Albums ===
- Incredible (Clique Girlz album) or the title song, 2008
- Incredible (Gary Puckett & The Union Gap album), 1968
- Incredible (Ilse DeLange album), 2008
- Incredible (Mary Mary album) or the title song, 2002
- Incredible (Xia album) or the title song, 2013
- Incredible, by Scherrie Payne, 1987

=== Songs ===
- "Incredible" (Celine Dion and Ne-Yo song), 2013
- "Incredible" (Keith Murray song), 1998
- "Incredible" (M-Beat song), 1994
- "Incredible" (The Shapeshifters song), 2006
- "Incredible" (Timomatic song), 2012
- "Incredible (What I Meant to Say)", by Darius Campbell, 2003
- "Incredible", by Future from Hndrxx, 2017
- "Incredible", by J. Holiday from Guilty Conscience, 2014
- "Incredible", by Madonna from Hard Candy, 2008
- "Incredible", by Sia from Reasonable Woman, 2024

== Other uses ==
- Droid Incredible, a smartphone
- The Incredibles, a 2004 American animated superhero film
- Aurore

== See also ==
- The Incredibles (disambiguation)
