= I Wasn't Born Yesterday =

Studio album by Sa-Fire
- Released: March 5, 1991
- Studio: Various Studios
- Genre: Pop, dance, Latin freestyle
- Length: 47:18
- Label: Mercury; PolyGram; (846 651)
- Producer: Chris Barbosa (track 1); Tom Keane (tracks 2 and 3); Michael Hutchinson (additional production on track 2); Carmen Rizzo (co-producer of track 2); David Morales (tracks 4 and 10); Ian Prince (track 5); Tony Moran (tracks 6 and 8); Gerry Brown (tracks 7 and 9)

Sa-Fire chronology
Sa-Fire (1988)	I Wasn't Born Yesterday (1991)	Atrevida (1996)

Singles from I Wasn't Born Yesterday
- 1. "Made up My Mind" Released: 1991; 2. "Taste the Bass" Released: 1991

Professional ratings
Review scores
Source	Rating
AllMusic	3/5 stars

I Wasn't Born Yesterday is the second album by singer Sa-Fire, released in 1991. The album's penultimate track, "I Never Heard," was written by Michael Jackson and Paul Anka. Jackson's original recording was later released on October 12, 2009 as the single "This Is It."

== Track listing ==
No.	Title	Writer(s)	Length
1.	"Made up My Mind"	Ernie Gold	4:47
2.	"Love's Gotta Be There"	Eric Nelson Pressly, Tommy Keane	3:52
3.	"Whatever Happens"	Paul Gordon, Keane, Elisa Fiorillo	4:45
4.	"Taste the Bass"	Eric Beall, Stephen Broughton	4:15
5.	"I Wasn't Born Yesterday"	Richard Bell, Lenny Macaluso	4:16
6.	"Some Things Never Change"	Tony Moran, Alexandra Forbes, Andy Marvel,	5:08
7.	"I Can't Cry"	Shelly Peiken	5:16
8.	"Shame"	Mac Quayle, Moran	4:57
9.	"I Never Heard"	Paul Anka, Michael Jackson	4:46
10.	"I'm a Victim"	Kay Julia Diaz, Wilma Cosme	5:16

== Personnel ==
- Sa-Fire - vocals
- Cynthia Todino, George Lamond, Dorian Holly, Christi Black, Julie Delgado, David Morales, Nadirah Ali, Tony Moran, Lilias White, Jackie Sirnley, Alex Brown, Marlene Jeter, Martinette Jenkins, Melanie Andrews, Margaret Furtado, Phaedra Butler, Rise Engelmann, Brian McKnight, Kipper Jones, Kenny Diaz, Connie Harvey, Janet Wright
- The Natural "E" - rapping and backing vocals
- John "Jubu" Smith, Frank Portalatin, Ted Karas, Michael Landau - guitars
- C.P. Roth, Peter "Ski" Schwartz, Satoshi Tomile, Eric Kupper, Andy Marvel, Aaron Zigman, David Irwin, David Franks, "Yrreg Nworb" (the name of the song's producer, Gerry Brown, reversed), Mac Quayle, Carl Wheeler, Ian Prince - keyboards
- Tom Keane - keyboard and synth programming

== Charts ==
Singles - Billboard (North America)

Year	Single	Chart	Position
1991	"Made up My Mind"	Hot Dance Music/Club Play	36
1991	"Made up My Mind"	Hot Dance Music/Maxi-Singles Sales	7
1991	"Made up My Mind"	The Billboard Hot 100	82
1991	"Made up My Mind"	The Billboard Hot 100 Airplay	60
1991	"Taste the Bass"	Hot Dance Music/Club Play	6
1991	"Taste the Bass"	Hot Dance Music/Maxi-Singles Sales	4
