= Cookie (singer) =

British soul singer

Janet Ramus, also known as Cookie, is a British soul singer. She performed the vocals on the UK number one house song "Lola's Theme" by The Shapeshifters, which was released in July 2004, and their hit single "Back To Basics". She was also featured in "Turn It Around" by Jason Karl.

As of 2004, she was part of the London Community Gospel Choir.

Cookie was also one of Kylie Minogue’s and Ronan Keating's backing singers in the noughties and is a touring member of Nick Cave & the Bad Seeds in 2022–2026.
