= You're Good for Me =

Single by Tony Moran featuring Kimberly Davis

from the album Moodswings
- Released: February 9, 2018
- Recorded: 2018
- Genre: Electronic; dance; progressive house
- Length: 4:02
- Label: Mr. Tanman Music
- Songwriters: Tony Moran; Kimberly Davis
- Producer: Tony Moran

Tony Moran singles chronology
"My Fire" (2016)	"You're Good for Me" (2018)	"I'm In Love With You" (2018)

Kimberly Davis singles chronology
"My Fire" (2017)	"You're Good For Me" (2018)

"You're Good for Me" is a song recorded and performed by the American Dance musician Tony Moran, featuring vocals from American singer Kimberly Davis. The collaboration marks Moran's eighth and Davis' second number one (as the two collaborated with Nile Rodgers on 2017's "My Fire"), on Billboard's Dance Club Songs chart, reaching the summit in its April 7, 2018 issue.

== Track listings ==
Digital download

- You're Good for Me (feat. Kimberly Davis) [Radio Edit] 4:02
- You're Good for Me (feat. Kimberly Davis) [Video Mix] 4:35
- You're Good for Me (feat. Kimberly Davis) [Tony M Urban Soul Rider Remix] 4:02

== Charts ==
=== Weekly charts ===
Chart (2018)	Peak position
US Dance Club Songs (Billboard)	1

=== Year-end charts ===
Chart (2018)	Position
US Dance Club Songs (Billboard)	46
