= Lick Me Up =

Single by Tony Moran and Dani Toro featuring Zhana Roiya
- Released: September 29, 2016
- Recorded: 2016
- Length: 6:33 (original)
- Label: Mr. Tanman Music, Swishcraft Music
- Songwriters: Tony Moran, Dani Toro
- Producer: Tony Moran

Tony Moran singles chronology
"Say Yes" (2016)	"Lick Me Up" (2016)	"My Fire" (2017)

"Lick Me Up" is a song recorded and co-produced by Tony Moran and Dani Toro featuring vocalist Zhana Roiya. The single marks Moran's sixth number one, as well as the first for both Toro and Roiya, on Billboard's Dance Club Songs chart, reaching the summit on April 15, 2017.

== Track listings ==
Digital download

1. "Lick Me Up" (Tony Moran and Dani Toro Club Mix)
2. "Lick Me Up" (Tony Moran and Dani Toro Mix-show)
3. "Lick Me Up" (Tom Stephan Remix)
4. "Lick Me Up" (Tom Stephan Dub Mix)
5. "Lick Me Up" (Division 4 and Matt Consola Remix)
6. "Lick Me Up" (Lucius Lowe Lick The Funk Mix)
7. "Lick Me Up" (All Ovah Dub vs Tom Stephan Mash-Up Private Mix)
8. "Lick Me Up" (Tony's Soulbeats by Tony Smith and Mike Lorello)
9. "Lick Me Up" (Tony Moran n Deep Influence Mix)
10. "Lick Me Up" (DJ Strobe Twisted Mix Full Extended Remix)
11. "Lick Me Up" (DJ Strobe Drum Intro Twisted Remix)
12. "Lick Me Up" (DJ Strobe Non Drum Intro Mixshow Twisted Remix)
13. "Lick Me Up" (Hector Fonseca n Eduardo Lujan Remix)
14. "Lick Me Up" (MSC Remix)
15. "Lick Me Up" (Dinaire+Bissen Remix)
16. "Lick Me Up" (Dinaire+Bissen Dub)
17. "Lick Me Up" (Enrry Senna Remix)
18. "Lick Me Up" (Hector Fonseca & Eduardo Lujan Remix)
19. "Lick Me Up" (Oscar Velazquez Remix)
20. "Lick Me Up" (Rich B Enriched Club Mix)
21. "Lick Me Up" (Rich B Enriched Dub Mix)
22. "Show Me Love" (DJ Mickeys Sydney Mardi Gras Anthem)

== Charts ==
Chart (2017)	Peak position
US Dance Club Songs (Billboard)	1
