= My Fire =

Single by Nile Rodgers and Tony Moran presents Kimberly Davis

from the album Moodswings
- Released: May 17, 2017
- Recorded: 2017
- Genre: Electronic; dance; progressive house
- Length: 3:58
- Label: Mr. Tanman Music
- Songwriters: Mike Greenly; Tony Moran; Audrey Martells; Nile Rodgers
- Producers: Tony Moran; Nile Rodgers; Georg Bissen

Nile Rodgers singles chronology
| "Telepathy" (2016) | "My Fire" (2017) | "Fantasy" (2017) |

Tony Moran singles chronology
| "Lick Me Up" (2016) | "My Fire" (2017) | "You're Good for Me" (2018) |

Kimberly Davis singles chronology
| "My Fire" (2017) | "You're Good For Me" (2018) |

"My Fire" is a song recorded and performed by American dance musicians Nile Rodgers and Tony Moran, featuring vocals from American singer (and Chic vocalist) Kimberly Davis. The song is co-produced by Rodgers, Moran and Georg Bissen. The collaboration marks Rodgers' fifth, Moran's seventh, and Davis' first number one, on Billboard's Dance Club Songs chart, reaching the summit in its July 29, 2017 issue.

In an interview with Billboard the artists discussed how the collaboration came together, which began after Rodgers heard a rough demo of the song. "The flame is burning, just waiting to be fanned," Davis said in a statement. "I hope our song makes people feel good, as though they’re in the middle of a party, letting go and having fun." It was also Davis' idea to ask Moran, whom she has worked with on previous projects, to have Rodgers involved in this effort, adding "Of course, I said yes. Not only is he my boss but he’s also Nile Rodgers! No sane music artist would deny Nile being a part of their project." Moran noted that "Nile is a true inspiration to the world in his ability to create and shape musical genres. It was a thrill to work with him in the booth."

Rodgers later told Billboard “It felt like a song I’d love to play on. I laughed and said, ‘Plug me in!’” Upon hearing the song hit number one, Rodgers (who was about to celebrate his 65th birthday on September 19), said "this is the coolest early birthday present I've ever received."

== Track listings ==
Digital download

- My Fire (feat. Kimberly Davis) [Tony Moran/Bissen Extended] 8:37
- My Fire (feat. Kimberly Davis) [Boris Remix] 8:37
- My Fire (feat. Kimberly Davis) [Rosabel Club Remix] 8:30
- My Fire (feat. Kimberly Davis) [Rosabel Dub] 7:28
- My Fire (feat. Kimberly Davis) [Victor Dinaire/Bissen Remix] 5:33
- My Fire (feat. Kimberly Davis) [Victor Dinaire/Bissen Mix Show] 4:41

== Charts ==
| Chart (2017) | Peak position |
|---|---|
| US Dance Club Songs (Billboard) | 1 |
