= I'm in Love with You (Tony Moran song) =

Single by Tony Moran featuring Jason Walker
- Released: May 25, 2018
- Recorded: 2018
- Length: 4:08
- Label: Mr. Tanman Music
- Songwriter(s): Tony Moran, Mike Greenly, Ryan Shaw, Jason Walker
- Producer(s): Tony Moran

Tony Moran singles chronology
"You're Good for Me" (2018)	"I'm in Love with You" (2018)

"I'm in Love with You" is a song by Tony Moran featuring American vocalist Jason Walker and released as a single in 2018, produced by Moran and co-written with Walker, Ryan Shaw, and Mike Greenly. The single marks Moran's ninth number-one, as well as Walker's fifth, on Billboard's Dance Club Songs chart, reaching the summit in the issue dated August 18, 2018.

== Track listings ==
Digital download (Radio Mixes)

1. "I'm in Love with You" – 4:08
2. "I'm in Love with You" (Victor Dinaire/Bissen Remix) – 4:38

== Charts ==
=== Weekly charts ===
Chart (2018)	Peak position
US Dance Club Songs (Billboard)	1
US Hot Dance/Electronic Songs (Billboard)	27

=== Year-end charts ===
Chart (2018)	Position
US Dance Club Songs (Billboard)	14
