= Thinking of You (Sa-Fire song) =

Single by Sa-Fire

from the album Sa-Fire
- B-side: "Let Me Be the One"
- Released: 1988
- Genre: Pop rock, adult contemporary, freestyle, R&B
- Length: 4:50 (album version)
- Label: Cutting/Mercury
- Songwriter(s): Wilma Cosmé, Russ DeSalvo, Bob Steele
- Producer(s): Aldo Marin

Sa-Fire singles chronology
"Love Is on Her Mind" (1988)	"Thinking of You" (1988)	"Gonna Make It" (1989)

"Thinking of You" is the third single from freestyle singer Sa-Fire's 1988 eponymous debut album. She collaborated on its authorship and composition with Russell DeSalvo and Bob B Steele. The recording was produced by Aldo Marin and Carlos Rodgers.

The single debuted at number 80 on the Billboard Hot 100 chart dated February 4, 1989 and peaked at number 12 thirteen weeks later. It charted for 24 weeks.

== Charts ==
Chart (1989)	Peak Position
U.S. Billboard Adult Contemporary	4
U.S. Billboard Hot 100	12
U.S. Billboard Hot Dance Music/Maxi-Singles Sales	26

=== Year-end charts ===
Chart (1989)	Position
United States (Billboard)	96
