= Love Is on Her Mind =

Single by Sa-Fire

from the album Sa-Fire
- Released: 1988
- Genre: Dance-pop, Freestyle
- Length: 4:56 (album version)
- Label: Cutting/Mercury
- Songwriter(s): Albert Cabrera, Tony Moran, Andy Tripoli
- Producer(s): Andy "Panda" Tripoli; The Latin Rascals

Sa-Fire singles chronology
"Boy, I've Been Told" (1988)	"Love Is on Her Mind" (1988)	"Thinking of You" (1989)

"Love Is on Her Mind" is the second single released by freestyle singer Sa-Fire from her 1988 eponymous debut.

== Track listing ==
No.	Title	Length
1.	"Love Is on Her Mind" (Vocal)	7:20
2.	"Love Is on Her Mind" (7" Edit)	4:05
3.	"Love Is on Her Mind" (House Version)	7:08
4.	"Love Is on Her Mind" (Rascal Beats)	3:40
5.	"Love Is on Her Mind" (Dub Version)	6:00

== Charts ==
Chart (1989)	Peak Position
U.S. Billboard Hot Dance Music/Club Play	29
U.S. Billboard Hot Dance Music/Maxi-Singles Sales	18
