= Gonna Make It =

Single by Sa-Fire

from the album Sa-Fire
- Released: 1989
- Genre: Dance-pop, Freestyle
- Length: 4:56 (album version)
- Label: Mercury
- Songwriter(s): David Harris
- Producer(s): Angelo Cosme, Aldo Marin, Albert Cabrera

Sa-Fire singles chronology
"Thinking of You" (1989)	"Gonna Make It" (1989)	"I Will Survive" (1989)

"Gonna Make It" is the fourth single released by freestyle singer Sa-Fire from her 1988 eponymous debut.

== Track listing ==
US 12" Single

No.	Title	Length
1.	"Gonna Make It" (Dance Mix)	6:12
2.	"Gonna Make It" (Dub Mix)	5:35
3.	"Gonna Make It" (Rascal Beats)	3:20
4.	"Gonna Make It" (Club House Mix)	6:42
5.	"Gonna Make It" (Dub House Mix)	5:14
6.	"Gonna Make It" (Single Edit)	3:56

== Charts ==
Chart (1989)	Peak Position
U.S. Billboard Hot 100	71
U.S. Billboard Hot Dance Music/Club Play	31
U.S. Billboard Hot Dance Music/Maxi-Singles Sales	20
