= Walk Away (Tony Moran song) =

Single by Tony Moran featuring Kristine W

from the album The Event / The Power of Music
- Released: 2007
- Genre: Dance music
- Length: 9:04
- Label: Dance Music Productions/Moran Music
- Songwriters: A. Rich, T. Moran, G. Chambers
- Producer: Tony Moran

Tony Moran singles chronology
"Walk Away" (2007)	"Keep Your Body Working" (2007)

Kristine W singles chronology
"I'll Be Your Light" (2006)	"Walk Away" (2007)	"The Boss" (2008)

Tony Moran & Kristine W singles chronology
"Walk Away" (2007)

"Walk Away" is the first single from Tony Moran's album The Event and features vocalist Kristine W. "Walk Away" also appears on Kristine W's album The Power of Music. The single went to #1 on the Billboard Hot Dance Club Play chart on October 13, 2007. It was Kristine W's tenth number one on the dance charts and Moran's first of two straight number ones on the same chart from "The Event" compilation. Matúš Valent features in the music video.

== Track listing ==
Official Remixes

1. "Walk Away" (Tony Moran/Warren Rigg Evolution Mix) (9:04)
2. "Walk Away" (Tony Moran/Warren Rigg Evolution Mixshow Edit) (7:21)
3. "Walk Away" (Tony Moran/Warren Rigg Evolution Radio With Intro) (3:52)
4. "Walk Away" (Tony Moran/Warren Rigg Evolution Radio Without Intro) (3:52)
5. "Walk Away" (Tony Moran/Warren Rigg/Dave Saronson "Walk Till You Sweat" Dub) (8:44)
6. "Walk Away" (Tony Moran/Warren Rigg Padppella) (8:45)
7. "Walk Away" (Peter Presta Prefect Club Mix) (10:16)
8. "Walk Away" (Richie Santana Mix) (8:14)
9. "Walk Away" (Friscia & Lamboy Mix) (10:19)

== See also ==
- List of Billboard number-one dance singles of 2007
