= So Happy (Tony Moran song) =

Single by Tony Moran featuring Jason Walker
- Released: 2016
- Recorded: 2016
- Genre: EDM; house
- Length: 4:38
- Label: Mr. Tanman Music
- Songwriters: Tony Moran; Chris Willis; Jason Walker
- Producer: Tony Moran

Tony Moran singles chronology
"Times Like These" (2015)	"So Happy" (2016)	"Say Yes" (2016)

"So Happy" is a song recorded by Tony Moran featuring American vocalist Jason Walker and released as a single in 2016. The track, produced by Moran and co-written with Walker and Chris Willis, is the New York-based producer/DJ/remixer's fourth number one, as well as Walker's third, on Billboard's Dance Club Songs chart, where it reached that summit in its June 4, 2016 issue.

== Track listings ==
iTunes listing [Volume 1]

- So Happy (Victor Dinaire & Bissen Video Mix) 4:38
- So Happy (Tony Moran & Deep Influence Mix) 7:26
- So Happy (Sted-E & Hybrid Heights Club Remix) 4:38
- So Happy (Victor Dinaire & Bissen Club Mix) 6:09
- So Happy (Sted-E & Hybrid Heights Dub / Instrumental Remix) 4:38
- So Happy (Moto Blanco Remix) 6:10
- So Happy (Moto Blanco Radio Edit) 3:52
- So Happy (Victor Dinaire & Bissen Radio Mix) 3:37
- So Happy (Moto Blanco Instrumental Remix) 6:10
- So Happy (Albert Cabrera Jeep Hevy Chill Out Re-Mix) 6:42

iTunes listing [Volume 2]

- So Happy (Todd Terry "In House" Remix) 7:03
- So Happy (Edson Pride Remix) 7:34
- So Happy (Nick Bertossi Remix) 6:47
- So Happy (Twisted Dee Remix) 6:34
- So Happy (Strobe Extended Club Remix) 5:43
- So Happy (Giangi Cappai Extended Remix) 6:35
- So Happy (DJ Head Remix) 5:13
- So Happy (Strobe Radio Remix) 4:41
- So Happy (Toy Armada & DJ Grind Club Remix) 6:37
- So Happy (Tony Moran & Deep Influence Remix) 7:26
- So Happy (Albert Cabrera Piano Chillout Remix) 3:41
- So Happy (Toy Armada & DJ Grind Radio Remix) 4:47
