= Tony Moran (DJ) =

American singer-songwriter (born 1964)

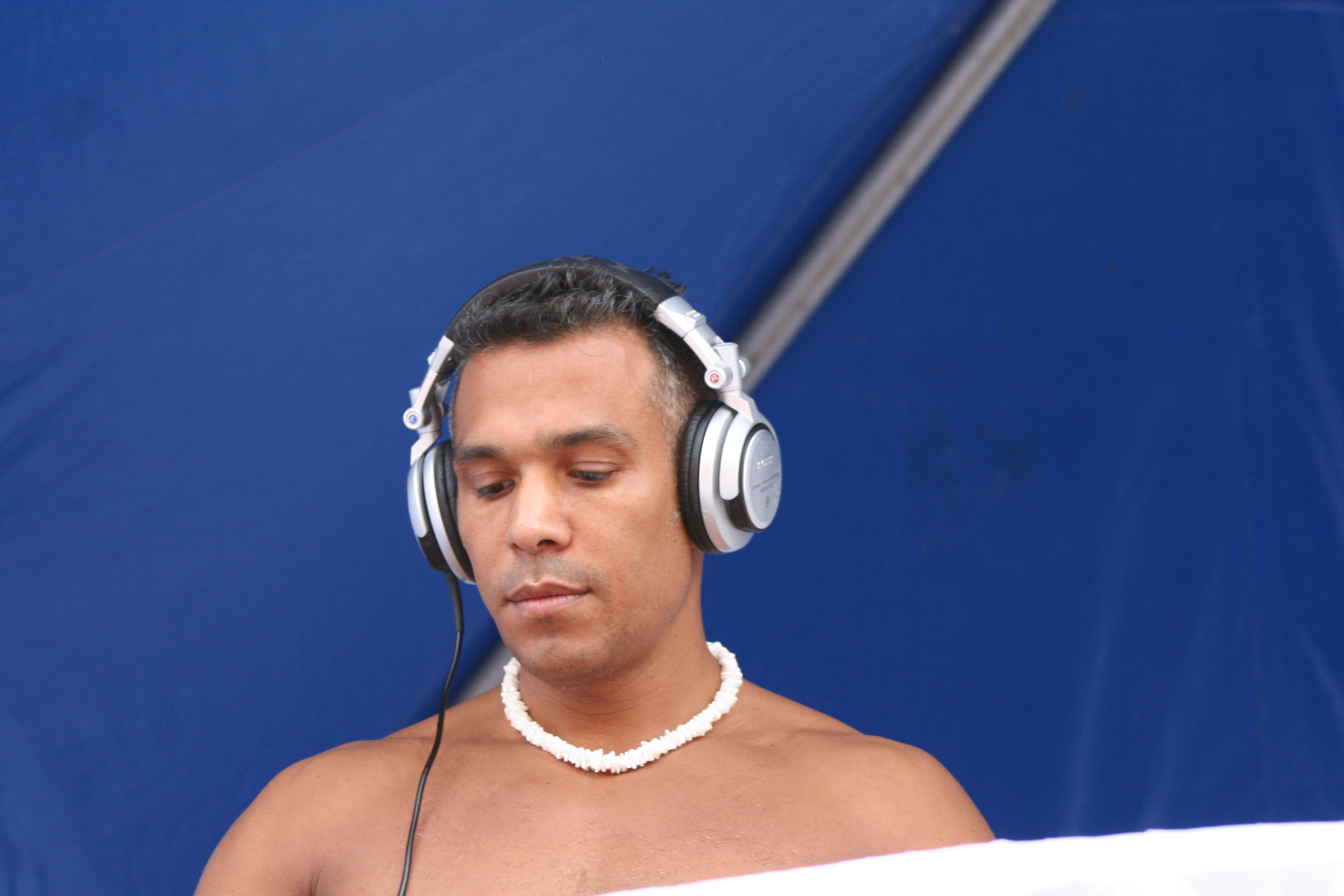
- Moran in 2007

Background information
- Born: Anthony Moran; December 2, 1964 (age 61)
- Genres: Dance; house
- Occupations: DJ; record producer; remixer; singer; songwriter
- Years active: 1981–present
- Formerly of: The Latin Rascals
- Website: www.tonymoran.com

Anthony Moran (born December 2, 1964) is an American DJ, record producer, remixer, singer and songwriter known for remixing popular songs. In 2007, he hit number one on the U.S. Billboard Hot Dance Club Play chart twice with "Walk Away" featuring Kristine W and "Keep Your Body Working" featuring Martha Wash. Moran also has a total of seven number one hits on the Billboard Dance Club Songs music charts in the United States and he has recently had four number one Billboard chart hits in the years 2016 and 2017.

As a remix producer, Moran has remixed work from top music artists including Michael Jackson, Madonna, George Michael, Mariah Carey, Whitney Houston, Cher, Selena Gomez, and others.

In December 2016, Billboard ranked him as the 92nd-most successful dance artist of all-time.

== Early life, family and education ==
Moran was raised in Brownsville, Brooklyn, New York. He attended Brooklyn Technical High School.

== Career ==
Moran began his career back in 1981, teaming with his friend Albert Cabrera as The Latin Rascals. Their edited versions of hit songs spliced together enjoyed major airplay on the New York City dance radio WKTU's mix show. The exposure led to a deal from Shakedown Studios which hired the duo to restructure popular hit radio songs into viable dance club hits. Shortly thereafter, they were contracted by Fever Records to write and produce a song for one of their new acts, the Cover Girls. The result was "Show Me", a song that became Moran's first top 40 hit. It also helped to usher in the freestyle era of music. This opened the doors for new artists including TKA, Sa-Fire ("Boy, I've Been Told"), and Lisette Melendez ("Together Forever").

Moran continues to produce music and has produced some major hits played in dance clubs such as "Put Your Hands Up", "Cafe Con Alegria", and "The Promise". He also produced "Body to Body, Heart to Heart" for Cher's Living Proof album and was nominated for two Grammys for his production of Gloria Estefan's "Don't Let This Moment End" and "Heaven's What I Feel". Another major production was Donna Summer's "You're So Beautiful", which appeared on her greatest hits album entitled The Journey: The Very Best of Donna Summer. In December 2012, Moran also released another original production with the late Donna Summer entitled "Valley of the Moon" which was recorded at the same time as "You're So Beautiful".

== Discography ==
=== Albums ===
- 1991: Same Sun, Same Sky
- 2004: Tour De Beats
- 2005: Concept of One
- 2007: The Event
- 2011: Mix Magic Music
- 2017: Moodswings

=== Singles ===
- 2000: "Shine On" featuring Cindy Mizelle
- 2004: "The Promise"
- 2004: "Live You All Over" presenting Deborah Cooper (#3 on Billboard chart)
- 2005: "Waiting for Alegria" with Ric Sena featuring Zhana Saunders (Top 5 on Billboard chart)
- 2007: "Everybody Dance (Clap Your Hands)" featuring Deborah Cox
- 2007: "Walk Away" featuring Kristine W. (#1 on Billboard chart)
- 2007: "Keep Your Body Working" featuring Martha Wash (#1 on Billboard chart)
- 2008: "Surrender Me" presenting Debby Holiday
- 2009: "You Are" featuring Frenchie Davis (top 5 on Billboard chart)
- 2010: "Destination" featuring Ultra Naté (#23 on Billboard chart)
- 2011: "Can I Love You More" featuring Trey Lorenz
- 2011: "Tenderness" featuring Deborah Cox
- 2011: "Magic" featuring Jennifer Holliday
- 2012: "If I Was Your Boyfriend" featuring Anastacia
- 2012: "Heart Beat" vs Deborah Cooper (#4 on Billboard chart)
- 2015: "I Like You" Tony Moran featuring Debby Holiday (Top 5 on Billboard chart)
- 2015: "Free People" featuring Martha Wash (#1 on Billboard chart)
- 2016: "So Happy" featuring Jason Walker (#1 on Billboard chart)
- 2016: "Say Yes" featuring Jason Walker (#1 on Billboard chart)
- 2017: "Lick Me Up" with Dani Toro featuring Zhana Roiya (#1 on Billboard chart)
- 2017: "My Fire" with Nile Rogers and featuring Kimberly Davis (#1 on Billboard chart)
- 2018: "You're Good for Me" featuring Kimberly Davis (#2 on Billboard chart)
- 2018: "I'm in Love with You" featuring Jason Walker (#1 on Billboard chart)

=== Remixography ===
- 1995: "Everlasting Love" by Gloria Estefan
- 1995: "Point of No Return" by Exposé
- 1995: "Billie Jean" by Michael Jackson
- 1996: "Chains" by Tina Arena
- 1996: "A Boy Like That" by Selena
- 1996: "I'm Not Giving You Up" by Gloria Estefan
- 1996: "It's All Coming Back To Me Now" by Céline Dion
- 1996: "No Frills Love" by Jennifer Holliday
- 1996: "For the Love of You" by Jordan Hill
- 1996: "I'd Really Love to See You Tonight" by Barry Manilow
- 1996: "Fastlove" by George Michael
- 1997: "Alane" by Wes Madiko
- 1997: "Step by Step" by Whitney Houston
- 1997: "Blood on the Dance Floor" by Michael Jackson
- 1997: "HIStory" by Michael Jackson
- 1997: "One More Time" by Real McCoy
- 1997: "Havana" by Kenny G
- 1997: "You Don't Know" by Cyndi Lauper
- 1997: "Together Again" by Janet Jackson
- 1997: "Like a Star" by Cynthia
- 1997: "Too Late, Too Soon" by Jon Secada
- 1998: "My Heart Will Go On" by Celine Dion
- 1998: "Oye!" by Gloria Estefan
- 1998: "Somewhere Tonight" by Lisa Frazier
- 1999: "Dov'è L'Amore" by Cher
- 1999: "Don't Stop" by Gloria Estefan
- 1999: "To Love You More" by Celine Dion
- 1999: "One for Sorrow" by Steps
- 2002: "Emotions" by Elle Patrice
- 2002: "Rising" by Elle Patrice
- 2002: "How Many" by Taylor Dayne
- 2003: "Walk On By" by Cyndi Lauper
- 2003: "Real Love" by Deborah Cooper
- 2003: "You're So Beautiful" by Donna Summer
- 2004: "Easy As Life" by Deborah Cox
- 2004: "R&B Junkie" by Janet Jackson
- 2004: "If I Close My Eyes" by Reina
- 2004: "Give It Up" by Kevin Aviance
- 2004: "The Promise" by Tony Moran
- 2004: "I'll Be Your Light" by Kristine W.
- 2004: "Cha Cha Heels" by Rosabel featuring Jeanie Tracy
- 2004: "Sanctuary" by Origene
- 2005: "The Wings" by Gustavo Santaolalla
- 2005: "We Belong Together" by Mariah Carey
- 2005: "Don't Forget About Us" by Mariah Carey
- 2005: "Into the West" by Annie Lennox
- 2005: "House Is Not a Home" by Deborah Cox
- 2005: "Movin' Up 2005" by Inaya Day
- 2006: "It Makes a Difference" by Kim English
- 2006: "Relax, Take It Easy" by Mika
- 2006: "Call on Me" by Janet Jackson
- 2006: "Get Together" by Madonna
- 2006: "Unfaithful" by Rihanna
- 2006: "About Us" by Brooke Hogan
- 2007: "Live Luv Dance" by Ron Perkov
- 2007: "Step into the Light" by Darren Hayes, singer of Australian Duo Savage Garden
- 2007: "It's My Life" by S Blush
- 2007: "Qué Hiciste" by Jennifer Lopez
- 2007: "I Got a Feelin'" by Vicki Shepard
- 2008: "Take a Bow" by Rihanna
- 2008: "I Get Off" by Ron Perkov
- 2008: "Turn It Up" by Basstoy featuring Dana Divine
- 2008: "The Flame 2008" by Erin Hamilton
- 2008: "Bring the Love" by Nicki Richards
- 2008: "I'm That Chick" by Mariah Carey
- 2009: "Miss You" by Ron Perkov
- 2009: "Crazy Possessive" by Kaci Battaglia
- 2009: "Body Rock" by Oceana
- 2009: "The Power of Music" by Kristine W
- 2009: "Come Back to Me" by Utada
- 2009: "Russian Roulette" by Rihanna
- 2010: "Strobelight" by Kimberley Locke
- 2010: "Beautiful Monster" by Ne-Yo
- 2010: "Destination" featuring Ultra Naté
- 2011: "Who Says" by Selena Gomez & The Scene
- 2011: "Can I Love You More" featuring Trey Lorenz
- 2012: "I Who Have Nothing" by Gladys Knight
- 2012: "Every Breath" by Inaya Day
- 2012: "Lay Your Hands" by Nicki Richards
- 2012: "Let Me Live Again" by Colton Ford
- 2012: "Valley of the Moon" by Donna Summer
- 2013: "Take It Like a Man" by Cher
- 2014: "I'm Not Coming Down" by Martha Wash
- 2014: "Stay for Awhile" by Amy Grant
- 2014: "Look My Way" by Colton Ford
- 2015: "I Love You More" by KC and the Sunshine Band
- 2016: "I'm Feeling You" by KC and the Sunshine Band featuring Bimbo Jones
- 2016: "Everything Happens for a Reason / Una Ragione" by Michéal Castaldo
- 2016: "The Girl from Ipanema" by Ana Paula featuring Deborah Cox
- 2017: "Show Me Love" by Justin Michael Crum
- 2017: "All The Man That I Need" by Deborah Cox from The Bodyguard musical
- 2017: "Let the World Be Ours Tonight" by Deborah Cox
- 2017: "Waving Through a Window" by Ben Platt from the musical Dear Evan Hansen
- 2017: "Believe" by Crystal Waters

== Tours ==
- Believe at Mexico (2017)
