= Incredible (The Shapeshifters song) =

2006 single by the Shapeshifters

Single by the Shapeshifters

from the album Sound Advice
- B-side: "Beautiful Heartache"
- Released: 6 March 2006
- Length: 3:39
- Label: Positiva
- Songwriters: Simon Marlin; Max Reich; Jenna Gibbons
- Producer: The Shapeshifters

The Shapeshifters singles chronology
"Back to Basics" (2005)	"Incredible" (2006)	"Sensitivity" (2006)

"Incredible" is the third single by English duo the Shapeshifters, released on 6 March 2006. It became their third consecutive top-20 single, peaking at number 12 on the UK Singles Chart, but remained in the top 75 for only four more weeks. It charted higher in Finland, where it debuted at number two and stayed in the top 20 for two more weeks; it is the band's highest-charting single there.

== Charts ==
Chart (2006)	Peak position
Australia (ARIA)	62
Belgium (Ultratop 50 Flanders)	42
Finland (Suomen virallinen lista)	2
Germany (GfK)	73
Netherlands (Dutch Top 40)	19
Netherlands (Single Top 100)	30
Scotland Singles (OCC)	13
Switzerland (Schweizer Hitparade)	73
UK Singles (OCC)	12
UK Dance (OCC)	3

== Release history ==
Region	Date	Format(s)	Label(s)	Ref.
United Kingdom	6 March 2006	CD	Positiva	
Australia	10 April 2006	CD	Positiva	
