= Keep Your Body Working =

Single by Tony Moran featuring Martha Wash

from the album The Event
- Released: 2007
- Recorded: 2007
- Genre: Dance/House
- Length: 4:14
- Label: Moran Music
- Songwriters: Norman Durham; Martha Wash
- Producers: Gary Salzman; Joe Koppie; Tony Moran

Tony Moran singles chronology
"Walk Away" (2007)	"Keep Your Body Working" (2007)	"Surrender Me" (2008)

"Keep Your Body Working" is a single released in 2008 recorded by Tony Moran featuring Martha Wash. It is the second number one single on the Billboard Hot Dance Club Play chart from Moran's 2-disc CD collection The Event, following "Walk Away." The CD promo-only single reached the top spot on December 22, 2007, and stayed there for two weeks.

The track itself is actually a "reworking" of a Disco classic by the group Kleeer, except it was originally titled "Keeep Your Body Workin'," which was written by Kleeer group member Norman Durham. The original peaked at number 54 on the Club Play chart in 1979. Although both versions featured the same chorus and elements, the Moran/Wash version had lyrics that were different from the original version.

== Charts ==
=== Weekly charts ===
Chart (2007–08)	Peak position
US Dance Club Songs (Billboard)	1

=== Year-end charts ===
Chart (2008)	Position
US Dance Club Songs (Billboard)	22
