= Boy, I've Been Told =

Single by Sa-Fire

from the album Sa-Fire
- Released: 1988
- Genre: Freestyle
- Length: 5:10 (album version)
- Label: Cutting/Mercury/PolyGram Records
- Songwriter: Marc Anthony
- Producers: Carlos Rodgers, Peter Schwartz

Sa-Fire singles chronology
"Let Me Be the One" (1987)	"Boy, I've Been Told" (1988)	"Love Is on Her Mind" (1988)

"Boy, I've Been Told" is the first single released by freestyle singer Sa-Fire from her 1988 eponymous debut.

== Track listing ==
US 12" Single

No.	Title	Length
1.	"Boy, I've Been Told" (Club Mix)	6:10
2.	"Boy, I've Been Told" (7" Version)	4:00
3.	"Boy, I've Been Told" (Rascal Dub)	5:40
4.	"Boy, I've Been Told" (Two in a Room Dub)	5:52

== Track listing ==
US CD Video

No.	Title	Length
1.	"Boy, I've Been Told" (Audio Track)	4:59
2.	"Gonna Make It" (Audio Track)	4:54
3.	"Together" (Audio Track)	4:53
4.	"Boy, I've Been Told" (Audio Track, 7" Remix)	4:00
5.	"Boy, I've Been Told" (Video Track)	4:00

== Charts ==
Chart (1988–1989)	Peak Position
Australia (ARIA)	156
U.S. Billboard Hot 100	48
U.S. Billboard Hot Dance Music/Club Play	13
U.S. Billboard Hot Dance Music/Maxi-Singles Sales	3
