= Say Yes (Tony Moran song) =

Single by Tony Moran featuring Jason Walker
- Released: October 14, 2016
- Recorded: 2016
- Genre: EDM; house
- Length: 3:24
- Label: Mr. Tanman Music
- Songwriters: Tony Moran; Mike Greenly; Jason Walker
- Producer: Tony Moran

Tony Moran singles chronology
"So Happy" (2016)	"Say Yes" (2016)	"Lick Me Up" (2016)

"Say Yes" is a song recorded by Tony Moran featuring American vocalist Jason Walker and released as a single in 2016, produced by Moran and co-written with Walker and Mike Greenly. The song's theme centers around marriage equality and expressing a declaration towards marrying a person regardless of their sex, color, nationality, or religion. The single marks Moran's fifth number one, as well as Walker's fourth, on Billboard's Dance Club Songs chart, reaching the summit in its December 17, 2016 issue.

== Track listings ==
Digital download (Radio Mixes)

1. "Say Yes" (featuring Jason Walker) [Moto Blanco Remix Radio Edit] – 3:24
2. "Say Yes" (featuring Jason Walker) [Victor Dinaire / Bissen Radio Remix] – 3:29
3. "Say Yes" (featuring Jason Walker) [Dave Audé Radio Remix] – 3:59
4. "Say Yes" (featuring Jason Walker) [Todd Terry Radio Remix] – 3:19
5. "Say Yes" (featuring Jason Walker) [Tony Moran & Deep Influence Radio Edit] – 3:23
6. "Say Yes" (featuring Jason Walker) [Dirty Disco Radio Edit] – 3:15
7. "Say Yes" (featuring Jason Walker) [Tony Moran & Brian Cua Radio Remix] – 3:58

Digital download (Volume 1)

1. "Say Yes" (featuring Jason Walker) [Moto Blanco Club Remix] – 6:07
2. "Say Yes" (featuring Jason Walker) [Tony Moran & Deep Influence Club Remix] – 7:28
3. "Say Yes" (featuring Jason Walker) [Victor Dinaire & Bissen Club Remix] – 5:58
4. "Say Yes" (featuring Jason Walker) [Alex Acosta Club Remix] – 5:41
5. "Say Yes" (featuring Jason Walker) [Todd Terry Club Remix] – 6:41
6. "Say Yes" (featuring Jason Walker) [Todd Terry Dub Remix] – 6:41
7. "Say Yes" (featuring Jason Walker) [Victor Dinaire & Bissen Dub Remix] – 6:01
