= Sa-Fire =

American singer

- Born: Wilma Cosmé; January 16, 1966 (age 60); San Juan, Puerto Rico
- Genres: Pop; Latin freestyle; Dance; Latin
- Occupation: Singer
- Instrument: Vocals
- Years active: 1986–present
- Labels: Mercury; Sony Discos

Wilma Cosmé (born January 16, 1966), better known by her stage name Sa-Fire, is an American singer. Sa-Fire's Latin freestyle music was able to break through into the broader pop music world. She has been featured in various magazines, such as Us Magazine, Billboard, Vogue, Elle, and most recently in the December 2011 issue of Signature Hits Magazine. She was the first Latina to appear on the cover of Spin Magazine. Sa-Fire has also appeared on television programs such as American Bandstand, The Pat Sajak Show, The Joan Rivers Show, Latin Connection, MTV International, The Party Machine with Nia Peeples, PM Magazine, Entertainment Tonight, Access Hollywood, TMZ, The View, MTV, and Telemundo. Sa-Fire has performed throughout the United States, Japan, Europe, the Caribbean, and South America. She has won numerous awards for her work, including six New York Music Awards, three Desi Awards, an ASCAP Award for writing "Thinking of You," and the LGBT Lifetime Achievement Award. She has sold over 1.9 million records.

== Biography ==
=== The 1980s ===
Safire was born as Wilma Cosmé in San Juan, Puerto Rico. She grew up in East Harlem, Manhattan, in New York City, and began her singing career as a session vocalist.

Her debut single, "Don't Break My Heart", was released in 1986. Following her second single "Let Me Be the One," her third, "Boy, I've Been Told," which was the first single from her self-titled debut album, released by Mercury/PolyGram Records, crossed over to pop radio and reached No. 48 on the Billboard Hot 100 chart.

Sa-Fire scored her most commercially successful hit with the ballad "Thinking of You" in 1989, which peaked at No. 4 on the Adult Contemporary chart and at No. 12 on the Billboard Hot 100. The song was translated into Spanish (as "El Recuerdo de Ti") by the singer–actor Ruben Blades. In 1989, Sa-Fire and "Thinking of You" were featured in a public service announcement commercial for AIDS awareness. The commercial was seen on Spanish-language television networks across the United States and Latin America. She also sang the song on an episode of the 1989 revival of The Mickey Mouse Club.

Sa-Fire's debut self-titled album peaked at #84 on the Top R&B/Hip-Hop Albums and at #39 on the Billboard Hot 200. Other singles of hers that charted on the Billboard Hot 100 include "Gonna Make It" and "Made Up My Mind."

In 1989, she covered "I Will Survive" for the soundtrack of the film She-Devil, which incorporated a house and hip-hop element into the 1970s disco hit.

=== The 1990s ===
In 1991, Sa-Fire was featured in A Christmas Message with Mercury/PolyGram Records labelmates Vanessa L. Williams and Brian McKnight, with her rendition of "Joy to the World."

Sa-Fire teamed up with Tommy Page to form the dance group La Casa, fronted by Allan Edwards Tibbitt & Dacia Palmer. Together, she and Page wrote and produced three songs that appeared on the New Faces compilation album released by Sire/Warner Bros. Records in 1993. This was not the first time Sa-Fire and Page had collaborated on a project. In 1990, they both co-wrote, produced, and sang the duet "Don't Give up on Love." The song was featured on Page's 1990 album Paintings in my Mind.

"Taste the Bass" was released as a single from her second album, I Wasn't Born Yesterday. The song peaked at No. 6 on the Hot Dance Music/Club Play chart. The lead single, "Made up My Mind," peaked at No. 9 on the Hot Dance Music/Club Play, but stalled at No. 80 on the Billboard Hot 100.

During the mid-1990s, Sa-Fire returned with a Spanish-language album, titled Atrevida. She then appeared on many shows like The Joan Rivers Show, The Pat Sajak Show, Club MTV, The Party Machine with Nia Peeples, Entertainment Tonight, and Access Hollywood. She also appeared in Vogue, Us Magazine, DJ Times, The New York Times, Elle Magazine, El Diario, El Vocero, New York Daily News, and other publications. She won six New York Music Awards, one pop ASCAP Award for "Thinking of You" for the most played song that year, and three Desi Awards as well.

=== The 2000s ===
After another hiatus, Sa-Fire announced the release of a new album, Bringing Back the Groove, in 2001. The album featured a cover of the New Edition hit "Can You Stand the Rain," featuring Cynthia. The album's second single, "Don't Break My Heart 2002," peaked at No. 3 on the Hot Dance Music/Club Play.

Her most recent single, "Exotique," was released online on May 6, 2009. Also, during that year, Sa-Fire's self-titled debut album, originally released in 1988, was made available as a download on iTunes. Sa-Fire's second album, I Wasn't Born Yesterday, was re-released on November 3, 2009, as a download.

=== The 2010s ===
In 2010, Sa-Fire announced on Urbanlatinoradio.com that she had begun working on a new Spanish-language pop album.

In a riff in his 2011 stage show Ghetto Klown, John Leguizamo said that “Madonna stole freestyle” from Puerto Rican singer Sa-Fire (“Thinking of You”) and Bronx trio Sweet Sensation (“If Wishes Came True”).

=== The 2020s ===
In 2021, Paper Magazine listed Sa-Fire as one of three iconic names of the freestyle sub-genre.

== Discography ==
=== Albums ===
- 1988: Sa-Fire (Cutting/Mercury/PolyGram Records)
- 1991: I Wasn't Born Yesterday (Mercury/PolyGram Records)
- 1996: Atrevida (Sony Discos)
- 2001: Bringing Back the Groove (Globestar)

=== Singles ===
Year	Single	US	US Dance	US Dance Singles	US AC
1986	Don't Break My Heart	—	—	31	—
1987	Let Me Be the One	—	—	26	—
1988	Boy, I've Been Told	48	13	3	—
1989	Love Is on Her Mind	—	29	18	—
1989	Thinking of You	12	—	26	4
1989	Gonna Make It	71	31	20	—
1990	I Will Survive	53	30	37	—
1991	Made up My Mind	82	36	7	—
1991	Taste The Bass	—	6	4	—
2001	Can You Stand the Rain	—	—	—	—
2009	Exotique	—	—	—	—

== See also ==
- Nuyorican
- Puerto Ricans in New York City
