= Georg Bissen =

Bissen
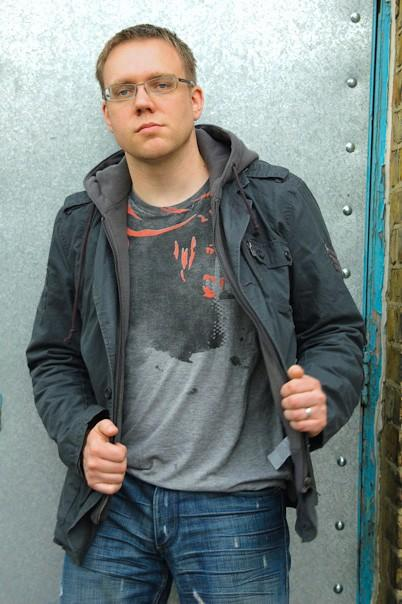

Background information
- Born: Hamburg, Germany
- Years active: 2005 - present
- Labels: Armada, Enhanced, Universal, Columbia Records, Atlantic Records, Mute Records, Discover, Boxer
- Website: www.djbissen.com

Georg Bissen is a dance music artist, producer and DJ.

== Biography ==
Bissen has over 100 original and remix releases throughout his career. He has also released 2 albums on Discover Records/Recoverworld, "Global Trance USA" and "Underground Anthems 3." Born in Hamburg, Germany Bissen lives in New York City.

Bissen is one half of the project "Exostate" on Enhanced Music. Exostate has had 2 records chart in the Trance top 10 on Beatport.

In 2012 Bissen teamed up with Victor Dinaire to start remixing artists on major labels. Their first of many remixes was M83 "Steve McQueen" as well as Major Lazer Jah No Partial. More recently Bissen and Dinaire remixed Jojo When Love Hurts and Ruth B Lost Boy. Their Remix of "Lost Boy" was in regular rotation on WAPE-FM Jacksonville and KKHH Houston during the summer of 2016.

In 2014, Bissen collaborated with COPILOT Music and Sound on a cover of Carlinhos Brown's "Maria Caipirnha (Samba da Bahia)”. The arrangement represented the musical instrumentation and styles of Germany for Visa's "Samba of the World", a digital campaign for the 2014 FIFA World Cup.

In 2015 Dinaire & Bissen wrote the soundtrack to the documentary "Glory Daze: The Rise and Fall of Michael Alig."

Bissen is a member of performance art band Soul in the Machine which secured a residency in 2021 at AREA15 in Las Vegas.

Bissen has written the theme songs to 2 TV shows: Pregnant In Heels on Bravo and Cover Shot on TLC.

== Charts ==
Title	Artist	Chart	Peak position	Credits
"My Fire"	Nile Rogers & Tony Moran	US Dance Club Songs (Billboard)	1	Producer/Remixer
"Walk Me Home"	P!nk	US Dance Club Songs (Billboard)	1	Remixer
