= The Shapeshifters =

English house producer and former duo

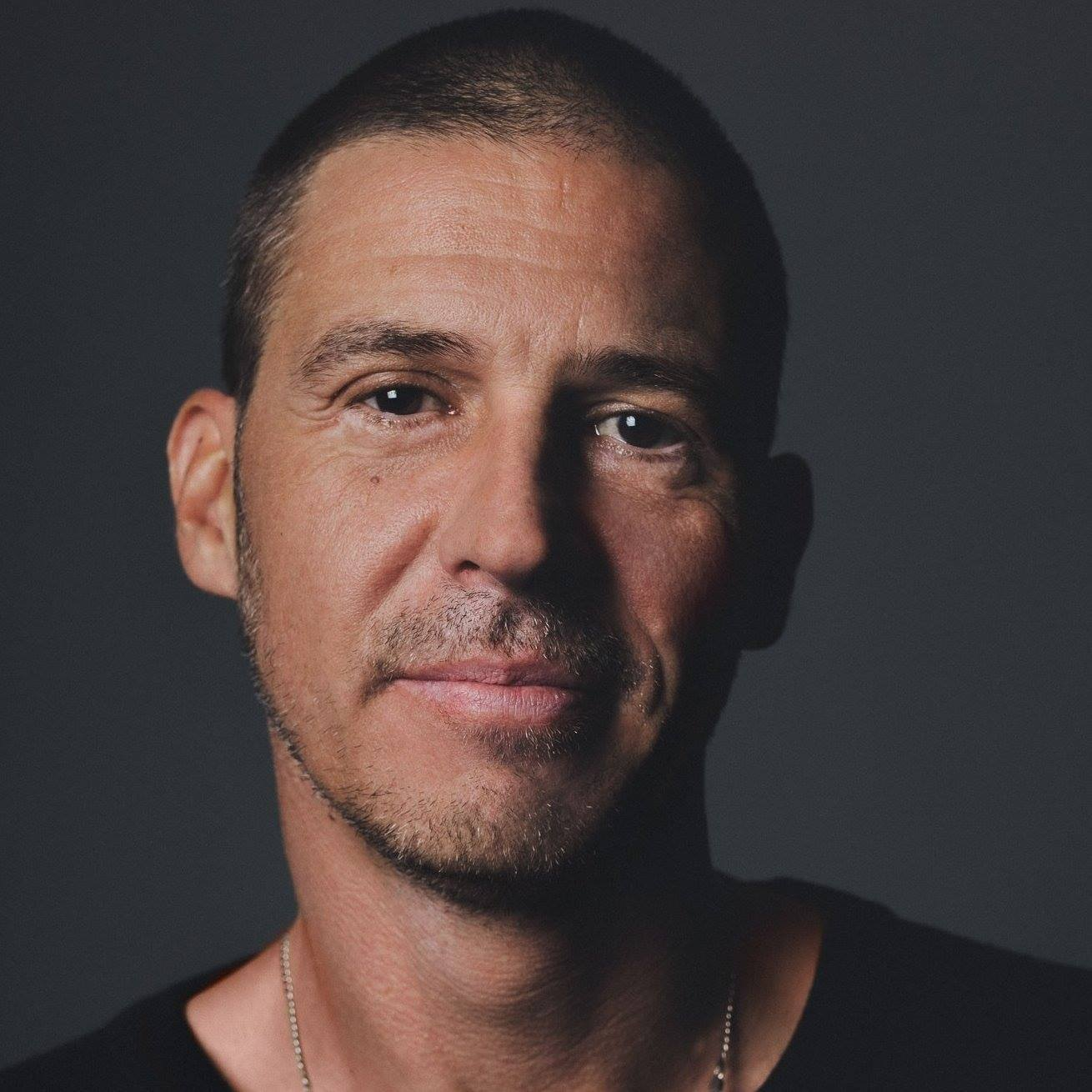
- Simon Marlin

Background information
- Origin: London, United Kingdom
- Genres: House, nu-disco, dance-pop
- Years active: 2004–present
- Labels: Positiva Records (2004–2008, UK); Ultra Records (2006–present, US); Defected (2008–present, UK); Glitterbox Recordings (2017–present, UK)
- Members: Simon Marlin
- Past members: Max Reich
- Website: www.theshapeshifters.co.uk

The Shapeshifters is the current alias of British house producer Simon Marlin and a former duo comprising Marlin and Swedish producer Max Reich, from Gothenburg. The Shapeshifters have been signed to Defected Records since 2008, and the duo were previously signed to Positiva. They are best known for their debut single "Lola's Theme", which went to No. 1 on the UK Singles Chart in July 2004.

Formerly producing and touring as a duo with Max Reich, Marlin has continued working and performing under the Shapeshifters moniker as a solo act since 2017.

His physical releases in the United States fell under the name Shape:UK, in part due to a trademark conflict with the Los Angeles-based hip hop group the Shape Shifters.

== Biography ==
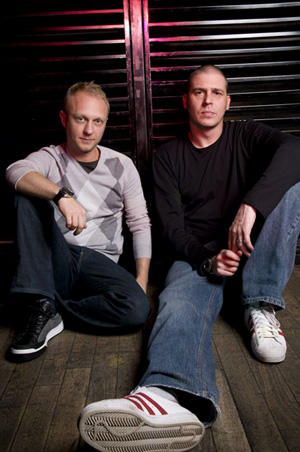
Former composition of The Shapeshifters, Max Reich and Marlin

The Shapeshifters are best known for their debut single "Lola's Theme", which went to number 1 on the UK Singles Chart in July 2004. The track was originally released as an instrumental promo in 2003 and was inspired by Marlin's ex-wife, Lola.

Their second single, "Back to Basics", was released in March 2005 and reached number 10 on the UK chart, while the third single "Incredible" reached number 12. Their debut album, Sound Advice, was released in March 2006 and peaked at number 76 in the UK Albums Chart, before being released in the United States on Ultra Records in September 2006. The fourth single, which featured Nile Rodgers of Chic, was called "Sensitivity" and charted at number 40 in July 2006.

In 2008, after four years with Positiva Records, the Shapeshifters signed to Defected Records. Their first release for Defected was "Treadstone" in April 2008, and this was subsequently followed by "Chime", a re-work of the Orbital track. "Chime" was also notably remixed by Martijn ten Velden. In September 2008, the Shapeshifters released The Shapeshifters – In the House—a mix album was part of the In the House series. In September 2008, the Shapeshifters also released "Lola's Theme ('08 Re-Edit)". This was originally an exclusive remix that the Shapeshifters used in their own DJ sets, but due to major demand and exposure, this title was released as a digital download through their own Nocturnal Groove record label. Upon its release, this title spent seven weeks at number 1 on the Beatport sales chart.

In July 2009, the Shapeshifters released the Young Dubs EP which included "Sideways" and "Nocturnal". Throughout 2009, the Shapeshifters also remixed Natalie Imbruglia's single ("Want") and collaborated with Frankie Knuckles on "The Ones You Love" which was released on Nocturnal Groove. They also remixed Candi Staton ("Musical Freedom") and compiled the digital compilation, Nocturnal Grooves: Vol. 2 – Mixed by the Shapeshifters as well as working alongside Empire of the Sun and Kleerup remixing "We Are the People" and "Longing for Lullabies". The Shapeshifters first release of 2010 was Summerdayze 2010 – Mixed by the Shapeshifters—a compilation album released to coincide with their Australian tour in January 2010 and further singles such as "Helter Skelter" and "She Freaks" followed. Within the year, both "Helter Skelter" and "She Freaks" gained over 1,000,000 views on YouTube. In 2010, the Shapeshifters remixed "Broken Arrow" by Pixie Lott and "Looking Forward" by Jason Chance. In April 2010, the Shapeshifters began the Nocturnal Groove Radio Show, a weekly radio show broadcast through a range of international radio stations across the world, which is also available as a podcast on iTunes and is available to stream from the Nocturnal Groove website and the Shapeshifters' pages on social networks like Facebook and SoundCloud.

The Shapeshifters have also worked on productions and remixes for George Michael, Faithless, Frankie Knuckles, Christina Aguilera, Moby, Leona Lewis, Todd Terry and Danny Howells. In 2011, the Shapeshifters released "Waiting for You" – their first collaboration with Shermanology – and remixed "I'll Take You There" from Frankie Knuckles's Director's Cut project. As well as remixing Human Life's "In It Together", the Shapeshifters also released another remix album titled Nikki Beach – In the House: Mixed by the Shapeshifters via Defected Records.

In the summer of 2013, the duo released the album Analogue to Digital...And Back Again, with digital (download) and physical (CD) versions, which contains productions remixed by other producers in part one and remixes in part two. This album contains a huge part of their production work from the years 2008 to 2013.

In the late 2010s, as DJs, the Shapeshifters continue to release records and tour the world and return to Ibiza for a 12th consecutive year at the Pacha and Space nightclubs in 2016. In 2017, the group played for Glitterbox at the new Hi Ibiza.

During the summer of 2017, Max Reich stepped away from the outfit, leaving long-term studio partner Marlin to carry on producing and touring. In 2017, the Shapeshifters released a new remix package of their hit "Lola's Theme", notably including a remix of "Purple Disco Machine".

In the late 2010s, Marlin released the singles "When Love Breaks Down" (2017) and "Try My Love (On for Size)" (2018), both successfully acclaimed by fans, other producers, and DJs. Moreover, in 2018, according to official sources, Marlin continues to tour under the Shapeshifters name, mainly in Europe.

The Shapeshifters collaborated with Chic's lead singer Kimberly Davis in 2019 and 2020 on the tracks "Life is a Dancefloor" (2019) and "Second Chance" (2020), which were released on Glitterbox, a sublabel of Defected Records.

In 2022, Marlin released the studio album "Let Loose". The Deluxe Edition of the album was released in 2023.

On 18 July 2024, the duo were featured on the single "Different" by British rapper ArrDee.

In 2026, Marlin appeared several times on the "Pleased as Punch" radio show live from his new studio "Earthworks". In August 2026, The Shapeshifters released the track "On The Way Up" Featuring 79.5 on Glitterbox Recordings.

== Awards and nominations ==
Award	Year	Category	Nominee(s)	Result	Ref.
Brit Awards	2005	British Single of the Year	"Lola's Theme"	Nominated	
Hungarian Music Awards	2007	Best Foreign Dance Album	Sound Advice	Nominated	
International Dance Music Awards	2005	Best Underground Dance Track	"Lola's Theme"	Nominated	
International Dance Music Awards	2005	Best House/Garage Dance Track	"Lola's Theme"	Nominated	
International Dance Music Awards	2005	Best New Dance Artist (Group)	Themselves	Nominated	
International Dance Music Awards	2007	Best House/Garage Dance Track	"Sensitivity"	Nominated	
Popjustice £20 Music Prize	2005	Best British Pop Single	"Lola's Theme"	Nominated	
Smash Hits Poll Winners Party	2004	Best Dance Act	Themselves	Won	
World Music Awards	2006	World's Best DJ	Themselves	Nominated	

== Discography ==
=== Albums ===
- 2004: Shapeshifters Present House Grooves (Virgin)
- 2005: Shapeshifters Present House Grooves Vol. 2 (Newstate)
- 2006: Sound Advice – No. 76 UK (Positiva)
- 2008: The Shapeshifters – In the House (Defected)
- 2009: Nocturnal Grooves: Vol. 1 – Mixed by the Shapeshifters (Nocturnal Groove)
- 2009: Summadayze 2010 – Mixed by the Shapeshifters (EQ Recordings)
- 2010: Nocturnal Grooves: Vol. 2 – Mixed by the Shapeshifters (Nocturnal Groove)
- 2011: Nikki Beach – In the House: Mixed by the Shapeshifters (Defected)
- 2013: Analogue to Digital...And Back Again (Nocturnal Groove)
- 2022: Let Loose (Glitterbox Recordings)

=== Singles ===
Year	Title	Peak chart positions											Certifications	Album
Year	Title	UK	AUS	BEL	FIN	GER	IRE	ITA	NED	NZ	SCO	SWI	Certifications	Album
2004	"Lola's Theme"	1	35	19	9	23	7	18	18	11	2	31	UK: 2× Platinum	Sound Advice
2005	"Back to Basics"	10	62	29	5	74	23	—	33	—	14	49		Sound Advice
2006	"Incredible"	12	62	42	2	73	31	—	30	—	13	73		Sound Advice
2006	"Sensitivity" (featuring Chic)	40	—	—	18	—	—	—	46	—	38	—		Sound Advice
2007	"Pusher"	56	—	—	15	—	—	—	89	—	33	—		Non-album single
2007	"New Day"	72	—	—	—	—	—	—	96	—	46	—		Non-album single
2008	"Chime"	—	—	—	—	—	—	—	—	—	—	—		Non-album single
2008	"Treadstone"	—	—	—	—	—	—	—	—	—	—	—		Non-album single
2008	"Lola's Theme" ('08 re-edit)	—	—	—	—	—	—	—	—	—	—	—		Non-album single
2009	"The Ones You Love" (with Frankie Knuckles)	—	—	—	—	—	—	—	—	—	—	—		Non-album single
2010	"Helter Skelter"	—	—	—	—	—	—	—	—	—	—	—		Non-album single
2010	"She Freaks"	—	—	—	—	—	—	—	95	—	—	—		Non-album single
2011	"The Ones You Love" (DJ Meme remix)	—	—	—	—	—	—	—	—	—	—	—		Non-album single
2011	"Waiting for You" (with Shermanology)	—	—	—	—	—	—	—	—	—	—	—		Non-album single
2012	"Shake, Shake"	—	—	—	—	—	—	—	—	—	—	—		Non-album single
2012	"Only You"	—	—	—	—	—	—	—	—	—	—	—		Non-album single
2014	"Heartache" (with Calvin Lynch)	—	—	—	—	—	—	—	—	—	—	—		Non-album single
2015	"It's You" (with River)"	—	—	—	—	—	—	—	—	—	—	—		Non-album single
2015	"The Chase" (with Kisch)	—	—	—	—	—	—	—	—	—	—	—		Non-album single
2017	"When Love Breaks Down" (with Teni Tinks)	—	—	—	—	—	—	—	—	—	—	—		Non-album single
2018	"Try My Love (On for Size)" (with Teni Tinks)	—	—	—	—	—	—	—	—	—	—	—		Non-album single
2019	"Life Is a Dancefloor" (with Kimberly Davis)	—	—	—	—	—	—	—	—	—	—	—		Non-album single
2020	"Second Chance" (with Kimberly Davis)	—	—	—	—	—	—	—	—	—	—	—		Non-album single
2020	"Finally Ready" (featuring Billy Porter)	—	—	—	—	—	—	—	—	—	—	—		Non-album single
2021	"You Ain't Love" (featuring Teni Tinks)	—	—	—	—	—	—	—	—	—	—	—		Non-album single
2024	"Different" (with ArrDee)	—	—	—	—	—	—	—	—	—	—	—		
"—" denotes items that did not chart or were not released in that territory.

=== Remixes ===
- 2003: Mr Mike – "Do It Again" (The Shapeshifters Remix) (Peppermint Jam)
- 2004: Danny Howells and Dick Trevor featuring Erire – "Dusk Till Dawn" (Shapeshifters Remix) (Cr2 Records)
- 2004: Patrick L – "Things We Wanna Do" (Shapeshifters Remix) (Onephatdeeva)
- 2005: We Deliver featuring Erire – "Breathe Again" (Shapeshifters Vocal) (Nocturnal Groove)
- 2005: George Michael – "Flawless" (Shapeshifters Remix) (Sony)
- 2005: Candi Staton – "You Got the Love" (Shapeshifters Vocal Mix) (Positiva)
- 2006: G-Club featuring Haze – "Faith" (The Shapeshifters Little More Faith Remix) (G-Club)
- 2006: Frankie Knuckles – "I've Had Enough" (The Shapeshifters Remix) (Noice Music)
- 2007: Christina Aguilera – "Ain't No Other Man" (Shape: UK Classica Mix) (Sony)
- 2007: Leona Lewis – "Bleeding Love" (The Shapeshifters Vocal Mix) (Sony/BMG)
- 2008: We Deliver featuring Erire – "Supernatural" (The Shapeshifters Remix) (Nocturnal Groove)
- 2008: Todd Terry All Stars – "Get Down" (The Shapeshifters Vocal Mix) (Strictly Rhythm)
- 2008: Moby – "I'm in Love" (The Shapeshifters Maximal Remix) (Mute)
- 2009: Kleerup featuring Titiyo – "Longing for Lullabies" (The Shapeshifters Vocal Mix) (Positiva)
- 2009: Natalie Imbruglia – "Want" (The Shapeshifters Vocal Mix) (Universal-Island)
- 2009: Empire of the Sun – "We Are the People" (The Shapeshifters Vocal Remix) (Virgin/EMI)
- 2009: Candi Staton – "Musical Freedom" (The Shapeshifters 'Big Fish, Little Fish' Remix) (Nocturnal Groove)
- 2010: Pixie Lott – "Broken Arrow" (Shapeshifters Club Mix) (Mercury)
- 2010: Jason Chance featuring Michelle Weeks – "Looking Forward" (The Shapeshifters Remix) (Stealth)
- 2011: Frankie Knuckles presents Director's Cut featuring Jamie Principle – "I'll Take You There" (The Shapeshifters Remix) (Nocturnal Groove)
- 2011: Frankie Knuckles & Director's Cut – "Your Love" (The Shapeshifters Remix)
- 2011: Human Life – "In It Together" (The Shapeshifters Remix) (Defected)
- 2011: Cee Lo Green – "Bright Lights Bigger City" (The Shapeshifters Heavy Disco Remix) (Elektra)
- 2012: Something Good feat. Sansa – "Before Dawn" (The Shapeshifters Remix) (Nocturnal Groove)
- 2013: Soulmagic – "Someone Like You" (The Shapeshifters Remix) (Strictly Rhythm Records)
- 2013: Soulmagic – "Someone Like You" (The Shapeshifters 'Du Jour' Remix) (Strictly Rhythm Records)
- 2013: Little Boots – "Broken Record" (The Shapeshifters Vocal Remix) (Nocturnal Groove)
- 2013: East & Young – "Starting Again" (The Shapeshifters Remix) (Ultra Music)
- 2014: Lovebirds featuring Lisa Shaw – "Holdin On" (The Shapeshifters Stripped Remix) (Defected)
- 2015: IDQ – "Where Are You" (The Shapeshifters Remix) (Love Inc)
- 2015: Cee Lo Green – "Music to My Soul" (The Shapeshifters Remix) (DMC)
- 2016: Full Intention – "Just Go Back" (The Shapeshifters Remix) (Full Intention Records)

== See also ==
- List of number-one dance hits (United States)
- List of artists who reached number one on the US Dance chart
