= Kimberly Davis (singer) =

American singer-songwriter

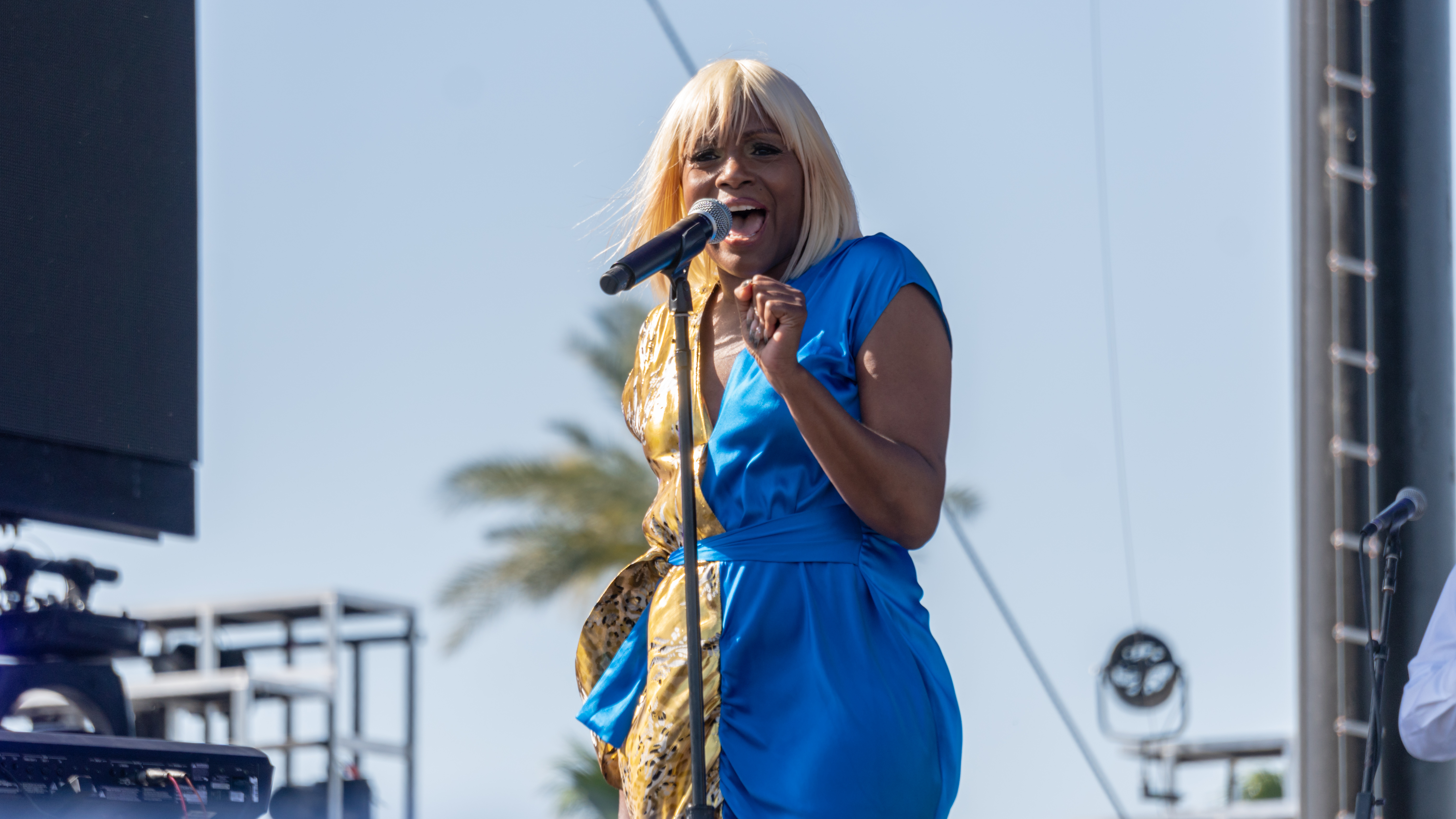
- Davis performing in 2018

Background information
- Born: Brooklyn, New York City, United States
- Genres: Disco, house
- Occupation: Singer-songwriter
- Instrument: Vocal
- Years active: 1984–present
- Label: York's Records
- Formerly of: Petite, Chic

Kimberly Davis is an American singer-songwriter. She rose to fame as one of the lead singers of disco band Chic. Davis was also an original member of female group Petite.

== Early life ==
Davis is from Brooklyn, New York City. She attended Fiorello H. LaGuardia High School of Music & Art and Performing Arts. In her youth, she sang in church choirs.

== Career ==
=== 1984–1985: Early beginnings and Petite ===
In 1985, Davis and the members of Petite were signed to York's Records in Brooklyn, New York. Later that year, they released their first single "So Fine". The single peaked at number 86 on Billboard's Hot R&B/Hip-Hop Songs chart. They released their debut album Teens in 1986. After the album failed to chart or generate a mainstream recognition outside of New York, the group began doing session work and became temporary background vocalists. Davis left the group and pursued a solo career after feeling creatively restricted within the group.

=== 2009–2025: Chic and single releases ===
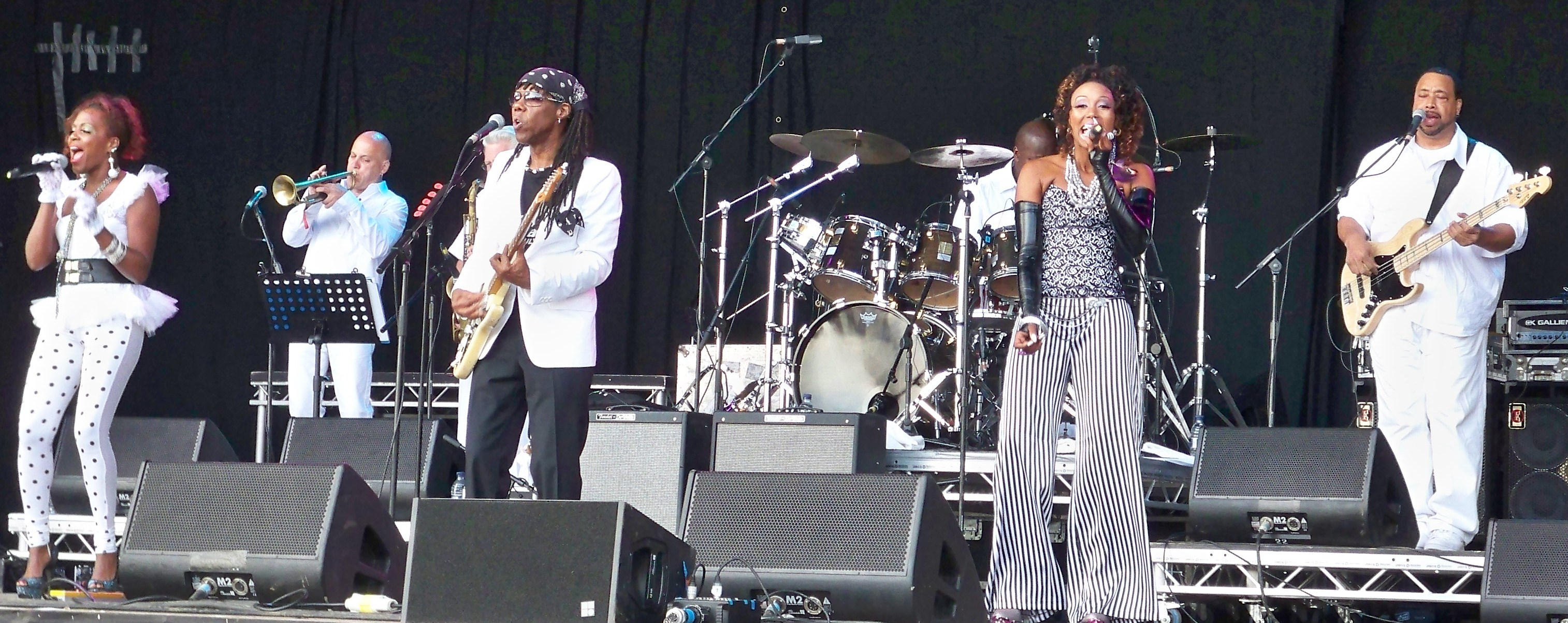
Davis (left) performing with Chic. (2012)

In 2009, she joined American disco band Chic. In 2010, Davis released her debut single "Get Up". The song peaked at number 12 on the US Dance Club Songs chart. Her follow-up single "Twist of Love" peaked at number 9 on the Dance chart in 2011. In December 2013, she released a single "With You", which peaked at number 4 on the Dance chart. She follow-up with another single "Speak No Evil". In 2017, she was featured on Tony Moran's single "My Fire" for the deluxe edition his album Moodswings. "My Fire" became her first song to peak at number 1 son the US Dance chart. Davis also featured on another single from the album called "You're Good for Me", which became her second number 1 song on the US Dance chart.

In September 2018, Chic released their ninth studio album It's About Time which Davis performed on. In June 2025, Davis departed from Chic.

== Discography ==
=== Singles ===
List of singles as lead artist, with selected chart positions and certifications, showing year released and album name
Title	Year	Peak chart positions		Album
Title	Year	US Dance	US Electronic	Album
"Get Up"	2010	12	—	Non-album singles
"Twist of Love"	2011	9	—	Non-album singles
"With You"	2013	4	29	Non-album singles
"Speak No Evil"	2014	—	—	Non-album singles
"Set Me Free" (Robert Clivillés featuring Kimberly Davis)	2015	—	46	Non-album singles
"My Fire" (Tony Moran featuring Kimberly Davis and Nile Rodgers)	2017	1	33	Moodswings (Feel)
"You're Good for Me" (Tony Moran featuring Kimberly Davis and Nile Rodgers)	2018	1	28	Moodswings (Feel)
"Life Is A Dancefloor" (The Shapeshifters featuring Kimberly Davis)	2019	—	41	Non-album singles
"Second Chance" (The Shapeshifters featuring Kimberly Davis)	2020	—	—	Non-album singles
"Love's Been Waiting" (The Shapeshifters featuring Kimberly Davis)	2022	—	—	Non-album singles
