= Greatest Remixes Vol. 1 =

Compilation album by Clivillés + Cole
- Released: 1992
- Label: Columbia
- Producer: Robert Clivillés; David Cole

Professional ratings
Review scores
Source	Rating
AllMusic	3/5 stars
Calgary Herald	B−
Entertainment Weekly	A
Los Angeles Times	3.5/4 stars

Greatest Remixes Vol. 1 is a compilation album of remixes by American dance music record producers Clivillés + Cole, released in 1992. The album includes remixes of Clivillés + Cole's own tracks along with their remixes of songs by other artists.

== Track listing ==
1. "C&C Music Factory MTV "Medley"" – C+C Music Factory
2. "Because of You" – The Cover Girls
3. "Don't Take Your Love Away" – Lydia Lee Love
4. "Two to Make It Right" – Seduction
5. "Pride (In the Name of Love)" [Techno House Version] – Clivillés + Cole
6. "Let the Beat Hit 'Em" – Lisa Lisa and Cult Jam
7. "Mind Your Business" – Clivillés + Cole
8. "You Take My Breath Away" – David Cole
9. "A Deeper Love" – Clivillés + Cole (lead vocals by Deborah Cooper)
10. "Clouds" – Chaka Khan
11. "True Love" – Billy
12. "Notice Me" – Sandeé
13. "Do It Properly" – 2 Puerto Ricans, a Blackman and a Dominican

== Personnel ==
Adapted from AllMusic.

- 2 Puerto Ricans, a Blackman and a Dominican – performer, primary artist
- Barbera Aimes – engineer
- James T. Alfano – assistant engineer, programming
- Ron Allaire – assistant engineer
- Fernando Aponte – assistant engineer, engineer
- Rodney Ascue – mixing
- Nick Ashford – composer
- Christopher Austopchuk – art direction
- Karen Bernod – background vocals
- Billy – performer, primary artist
- C+C Music Factory – performer, primary artist
- Albert Cabrera – editing
- Bruce Calder – assistant engineer
- Bonzai Jim Caruso – engineer
- Jim Caruso – engineer, producer
- Clivillés and Cole – performer, primary artist
- Robert Clivillés – arranger, composer, drums, editing, keyboards, mixing, percussion, producer, vocals, background vocals
- David Cole – arranger, composer, drums, keyboard arrangements, keyboards, mixing, percussion, performer, primary artist, producer, vocals, background vocals
- Deborah Cooper – vocals, background vocals
- The Cover Girls – performer, primary artist
- Ricky Crespo – editing, keyboards, mixing, producer
- Zelma Davis – vocals
- Craig Derry – background vocals
- Will Downing – background vocals
- Alan Friedman – assistant producer, composer, overdubs, producer, programming
- April Harris – vocals
- Alec Head – engineer
- Joe Hornof – programming
- Richard Joseph – engineer
- Acar S. Key – engineer, mixing
- Chaka Khan – performer, primary artist
- Lisa Lisa – performer, vocals, background vocals
- Lisa Lisa and Cult Jam – performer, primary artist
- Lydia Lee Love – primary artist
- Arif Mardin – producer
- Veronica McHugh – coordination
- Bruce Miller – engineer
- George Morel – editing
- Ken Nahoum – art direction
- John Parthum – assistant engineer
- Jimmy Paterson – assistant engineer
- Paul Pesco – guitar, vocals
- Brian Pollack – assistant engineer
- Duran Ramos – composer
- Bob Rosa – editing, mixing
- Angel Sabater – vocals
- Sandeé – performer, primary artist
- Seduction – performer, primary artist
- Valerie Simpson – composer
- Carole Sylvan – background vocals
- Ken Taylor – composer
- U2 – composer
- Barbara Warren-Pace – coordination
- Martha Wash – vocals
- Freedom Williams – composer, vocals
- Norma Jean Wright – background vocals
- Tonya Wynn – composer, vocals
- Larry Yasgar – executive producer

== Charts ==
=== Weekly charts ===
Chart (1992)	Peak position
Australian Albums Chart	43
UK Albums Chart	45
US Billboard 200	87
