= I'm Every Woman =

1978 single by Chaka Khan

- Standard picture sleeve (US release pictured)

Single by Chaka Khan

from the album Chaka
- B-side: "A Woman in a Man's World"
- Released: September 26, 1978
- Recorded: May 17, 1978
- Genre: Disco; soul
- Length: 4:08 (album version); 3:42 (single edit)
- Label: Warner Bros.
- Songwriters: Nickolas Ashford; Valerie Simpson
- Producer: Arif Mardin

Chaka Khan singles chronology
"I'm Every Woman" (1978)	"Life Is a Dance" (1978)

Music video
- "I'm Every Woman" on YouTube

"I'm Every Woman" is a song by American singer Chaka Khan, released in September 1978 by Warner Bros. as her debut solo single from her first album, Chaka (1978). It was Khan's first hit outside her recordings with the funk band Rufus. "I'm Every Woman" was produced by Arif Mardin and written by the successful songwriting team Nickolas Ashford and Valerie Simpson. The single established Chaka's career outside the group Rufus, whom she would leave after their eighth studio album, Masterjam, was released in late 1979.

The track was remixed and re-released in 1989 for Khan's remix album Life Is a Dance: The Remix Project; this mix reached number eight in the United Kingdom. American singer Whitney Houston covered the song in 1992 with production by David Cole and Robert Clivillés and vocals produced by Narada Michael Walden. It was a major hit, peaking at number four on both the US Billboard Hot 100 and the UK Singles Chart.

== Chart performance ==
In the United States, "I'm Every Woman" reached number twenty-one on the Billboard Hot 100, number one on the Hot Soul Singles, and number thirty on the disco chart. In the United Kingdom, it peaked at number eleven.

== Music video ==
A music video was produced for Khan's version of "I'm Every Woman" at a time when the value of promotional films was increasing. The video, which features five dancing Chakas dressed in various outfits to represent "every woman", was made a few years before the onset of mainstream coverage of "music promos" through such outlets as MTV, VH1, and BET.

== Impact and legacy ==
In 2020, Slant Magazine ranked "I'm Every Woman" number 11 in their list of "The 100 Best Dance Songs of All Time". In 2022, Rolling Stone ranked it number 27 in their list of "200 Greatest Dance Songs of All Time". In 2025, Billboard magazine ranked it number 12 in their list of "The 100 Greatest LGBTQ+ Anthems of All Time".

I'm Every Woman – The Chaka Khan Musical is the name of a musical telling the story of Chaka Khan. It made its premiere at Hackney Empire in the UK in 2026, and is set to transfer to the Troubadour Wembley Park Theatre in July 2026.

The song appeared in the 2026 film Spider-Man: Brand New Day.

== Credits and personnel ==
- Lead and background vocals by Chaka Khan
- Background vocals by Will Lee and Hamish Stuart
- Produced by Arif Mardin
- Drums by Steve Ferrone
- Bass by Will Lee
- Guitars by Hamish Stuart and Phil Upchurch
- Piano by Richard Tee
- Engineer by James Douglass

== Charts ==
Chart (1978–1979)	Peak position
Australia (Kent Music Report)	27
Belgium (Ultratop 50 Flanders)	20
Ireland (IRMA)	16
Netherlands (Dutch Top 40)	19
Netherlands (Single Top 100)	15
New Zealand (Recorded Music NZ)	18
UK Singles (Official Charts)	11
US Billboard Hot 100	21
US Dance Club Songs (Billboard)	30
US Hot R&B/Hip-Hop Songs (Billboard)	1

Chart (1989)	Peak position
Belgium (Ultratop 50 Flanders)	20
Europe (Eurochart Hot 100)	31
Ireland (IRMA)	7
Luxembourg (Radio Luxembourg)	8
Netherlands (Dutch Top 40)	9
Netherlands (Single Top 100)	9
UK Singles (OCC)	8

== Certifications ==
Region	Certification	Certified units/sales
Australia (ARIA)	Platinum	70,000^{‡}
New Zealand (RMNZ)	Platinum	30,000^{‡}
United Kingdom (BPI) Sales since November 14, 2004	Platinum	600,000^{‡}
United States (RIAA)	Gold	500,000^{‡}
^{‡} Sales+streaming figures based on certification alone.

== Whitney Houston version ==
"I'm Every Woman"

Single by Whitney Houston

from the album The Bodyguard: Original Soundtrack Album
- B-side: "Who Do You Love"
- Released: January 2, 1993
- Recorded: August 19, 1992
- Studio: Tarpan Studios, San Rafael, CA, Ocean Way
- Genre: Dance-pop; house
- Length: 4:47
- Label: Arista
- Songwriters: Nickolas Ashford; Valerie Simpson
- Producers: Narada Michael Walden; David Cole; Robert Clivillés

Whitney Houston singles chronology
"I Will Always Love You" (1992)	"I'm Every Woman" (1993)	"I Have Nothing" (1993)

Music video
- "I'm Every Woman" on YouTube

American singer and actress Whitney Houston recorded "I'm Every Woman" for The Bodyguard soundtrack. Houston's version was produced by Narada Michael Walden, with additional production by David Cole and Robert Clivillés from C+C Music Factory. Recorded during Houston's pregnancy with Bobbi Kristina Brown, it was released as Houston's second single from the soundtrack on January 2, 1993, by Arista Records. Her version adds the introduction "Whatever you want, whatever you need..." where Houston contributed to the song to differentiate it from the original. Houston's then-assistant and friend Robyn Crawford later claimed that Houston had long wanted to record one of Khan's songs and was convinced by Crawford to record it for the soundtrack. Contrary to popular belief, Houston did not perform backing vocals on Khan's original 1978 version. Chaka Khan confirmed this in an interview with Lester Holt in 2012. Her mother Cissy had contributed background vocals on Khan's original. Houston, however, did contribute background vocals to two Khan songs off her album, Naughty, during her early career as a session vocalist. As a tribute to Khan, Houston proclaims Khan's name towards the end of the song. A live performance of "I'm Every Woman" was included in the 1999 release Divas Live '99 as a duet with Chaka Khan. A 1994 performance was included on the 2014 CD and DVD release, Whitney Houston Live: Her Greatest Performances.

=== Release ===
When "I'm Every Woman" was released, Houston's preceding single, "I Will Always Love You," was still at number one on the US Billboard Hot 100 (it remained there for eight more weeks). In its sixth week on the chart, the song entered the top ten at number ten on February 13, 1993. In its seventh, the song climbed to its peak position of number four. In accomplishing this feat, Houston became the first female artist since Madonna in 1985 to land multiple songs inside the top five of the Billboard Hot 100. Houston was also the fifth overall artist after Elvis Presley, the Beatles and Bee Gees preceded her. On March 13, Houston became the first artist of the Nielsen Soundscan era to chart three songs simultaneously inside the top 20 of the Billboard Hot 100 after "I'm Every Woman" and "I Will Always Love You" were joined by the third Bodyguard single, "I Have Nothing". It would remain inside the top ten for eight weeks and inside the top 40 for 19 weeks, eventually spending a total of 23 weeks altogether.

On the Hot R&B Singles chart, the song joined "I Will Always Love You" inside the top ten at number 10 on February 20. The song reached its peak position of number five on February 27. Like inside the Hot 100, the track would stay inside the top ten for eight weeks.

The song reached number one on the Billboard Hot Dance Club Play chart, marking Houston's fourth number-one single on the dance chart and her first chart-topper there since "Love Will Save the Day" topped the chart in 1988. It also reached the top 30 of the Hot Adult Contemporary Tracks at number 26. In Canada, the song reached number two.

Outside North America, the song was a huge global hit. It reached number 6 on the Eurochart Hot 100. The dance song reached the top ten in 12 individual European countries, reaching number 2 in Belgium, number 3 in Spain and the Netherlands' Dutch Top 40, number 4 in the UK, Ireland, the Netherlands' Single Top 100 and Portugal, number 5 in Denmark, number 6 in Italy, number 7 in Sweden and Greece, number 8 in Iceland and number 10 in Finland. In Germany, Austria and Switzerland, it reached the top 20. In Oceania, the song reached higher positions than in Khan's version, peaking at number 5 in New Zealand and number 11 in Australia.

=== Critical reception ===
AllMusic editor Stephen Thomas Erlewine praised Houston's cover version of "I'm Every Woman", stating that it's a "first-rate" urban pop song "that skillfully capture[s] Houston at her best." Upon the release, Larry Flick from Billboard magazine wrote, "Utilizing the original version's instantly recognizable vocal arrangement, Houston belts with unbridled confidence and power." Randy Clark from Cash Box named it a "dance-inspired tune", noting its "discotheque feel and obvious dance floor appeal. Although Whitney is the strongest aspect of this song, the combination of her voice and the house jam should launch this track high onto various charts and playlists alike." Entertainment Weekly's Amy Linden praised the cover as "triumphant". She explained, "To take on another diva's material requires the female equivalent of cojones, and Houston (wisely) doesn't muck around with the original's overall tone or arrangement. But she sure does it justice, even adding a sly Chaka shout-out as the cut fades."

Alan Jones from Music Week felt the singer "does her best to xerox the performance of Chaka Khan." Nancy Culp from NME said her "Whitney-ed version" is "well over the top and she carries it decently, but lacks the real soul to give it punch." Stephen Holden of The New York Times wrote, "Though not as exuberantly sexy as the original, her version [...] is a respectable imitation." A writer from Rolling Stone called it an overwrought remake and added that Whitney undermined her soul roots. USA Today complimented the song, "She adds surprises: Chaka Khan's 'I'm Every Woman' becomes sweaty house music."

=== Music video ===
The accompanying music video for "I'm Every Woman" was directed by Randee St. Nicholas, and features a very pregnant Houston performing the song, while scenes from The Bodyguard are intercut into the clip. In addition to Houston's mother Cissy Houston, the video also features cameo appearances by Chaka Khan, Valerie Simpson, Martha Wash and labelmates TLC. The video was later made available on Houston's official YouTube channel in 2009 and had generated more than 101 million views as of September 2025.

=== Accolades ===
The song was nominated for the Grammy Award for Best Female R&B Vocal Performance at the 36th Annual Grammy Awards in 1994, losing out to Toni Braxton's "Another Sad Love Song" while the video won the NAACP Image Award for Outstanding Music Video that same year. In its list of the "250 Best Songs of the 1990s", Pitchfork ranked Houston's version at number 211.

=== Track listings and formats ===
- CD single
1. "I'm Every Woman" – 4:45
2. "Who Do You Love" – 3:55
- European CD maxi-single
1. "I'm Every Woman" (7" single) – 4:44
2. "I'm Every Woman" (Clivillés & Cole House Mix I) – 10:37
3. "I'm Every Woman" (a cappella) – 4:27
- UK CD maxi-single
1. "I'm Every Woman" (7" single) – 4:44
2. "I'm Every Woman" (Every Woman's House/Club Mix Radio Edit) – 4:40
3. "I'm Every Woman" (Clivillés & Cole House Mix I) – 10:37
4. "I'm Every Woman" (Every Woman's House/Club Mix) – 10:14
5. "I'm Every Woman" (Every Woman's Beat) – 4:11
6. "I'm Every Woman" (a cappella) – 4:27
- US CD maxi-single
1. "I'm Every Woman" (Every Woman's House/Club Mix Radio Edit) – 4:40
2. "I'm Every Woman" (album version) – 4:45
3. "I'm Every Woman" (Every Woman's House/Club Mix) – 10:14
4. "I'm Every Woman" (Clivillés & Cole House Mix I) – 10:37
5. "I'm Every Woman" (Clivillés & Cole House Mix II) – 10:54
6. "Who Do You Love" – 3:55
- US 12" maxi-single
1. "I'm Every Woman" (Every Woman's House/Club Mix) – 10:14
2. "I'm Every Woman" (Every Woman's Beat) – 4:11
3. "I'm Every Woman" (Clivillés & Cole House Mix I) – 10:37
4. "I'm Every Woman" (Clivillés & Cole House Mix II) – 10:54
5. "I'm Every Woman" (The C & C Dub) – 10:03
6. "I'm Every Woman" (a cappella) – 4:27

=== Credits and personnel ===
- Performed by Whitney Houston
- Produced by Narada Michael Walden
- Additional production and remix by Robert Clivilles and David Cole
- Vocal arrangement inspired by Chaka Khan
- Additional vocal arrangement and production by Robert Clivilles and David Cole
- Percussion by Bashiri Johnson
- Roland TR-909 Programming by Louis Biancaniello, James Alfano and Chauncey Mahan
- Recording engineers – Matt Rohr, Marc Reyburn
- Additional production recording engineers – Acar S. Key, Richard Joseph
- Mixing engineer – Bob Rosa
- Executive producers – Clive Davis, Whitney Houston

=== Charts ===
==== Weekly charts ====
Chart (1993)	Peak position
Australia (ARIA)	11
Austria (Ö3 Austria Top 40)	19
Belgium (Ultratop 50 Flanders)	2
Canada Top Singles (RPM)	2
Canada Adult Contemporary (RPM)	11
Canada Dance/Urban (RPM)	1
Canada Contemporary Hit Radio (The Record)	2
Denmark (IFPI)	5
Europe (Eurochart Hot 100)	6
Europe (European Dance Radio)	1
Europe (European Hit Radio)	1
Finland (Suomen virallinen lista)	10
France (SNEP)	11
Germany (GfK)	13
Greece (Pop + Rock)	7
Iceland (Íslenski Listinn Topp 40)	8
Ireland (IRMA)	4
Israel (Israeli Singles Chart)	4
Italy (Musica e dischi)	6
Netherlands (Dutch Top 40)	3
Netherlands (Single Top 100)	4
New Zealand (Recorded Music NZ)	5
Portugal (AFP)	4
Quebec (ADISQ)	7
Spain (AFYVE)	3
Sweden (Sverigetopplistan)	7
Switzerland (Schweizer Hitparade)	18
UK Singles (Official Charts)	4
UK Airplay (Music Week)	1
UK Dance (Music Week)	1
UK Club Chart (Music Week)	1
US Billboard Hot 100	4
US Adult Contemporary (Billboard)	26
US Dance Club Songs (Billboard)	1
US Dance Singles Sales (Billboard)	1
US Hot R&B/Hip-Hop Songs (Billboard)	5
US Pop Airplay (Billboard)	3
US Rhythmic Airplay (Billboard)	11
US Cash Box Top 100	1
US R&B Singles (Cash Box)	1
US CHR/Pop Airplay (Radio & Records)	1

Chart (2012)	Peak position
Australia (ARIA)	95
France (SNEP)	92
Japan Hot 100 (Billboard)	53
Netherlands (Single Top 100)	87
US Digital Song Sales (Billboard)	70

Chart (2022)	Peak position
South Africa Radio (RISA)	34

==== Year-end charts ====
Chart (1993)	Position
Australia (ARIA)	61
Belgium (Ultratop 50 Flanders)	41
Canada Top Singles (RPM)	31
Canada Adult Contemporary (RPM)	79
Canada Dance/Urban (RPM)	13
Europe (Eurochart Hot 100)	36
Europe (European Dance Radio)	21
Europe (European Hit Radio)	16
Germany (Media Control)	80
Iceland (Íslenski Listinn Topp 40)	55
Israel (Israeli Singles Chart)	44
Netherlands (Dutch Top 40)	46
Netherlands (Single Top 100)	56
Sweden (Topplistan)	81
UK Singles (OCC)	51
UK Airplay (Music Week)	8
UK Club Chart (Music Week)	9
US Billboard Hot 100	39
US Dance Club Play (Billboard)	10
US Hot R&B Singles (Billboard)	35
US Maxi-Singles Sales (Billboard)	25
US Cash Box Top 100	21

=== Certifications and sales ===
Region	Certification	Certified units/sales
Australia (ARIA)	Gold	35,000^{^}
United Kingdom (BPI)	Silver	200,000^{‡}
United States (RIAA)	Platinum	1,000,000^{‡}
^{^} Shipments figures based on certification alone.^{‡} Sales+streaming figures based on certification alone.

=== Release history ===
Region	Date	Format(s)	Label(s)	Ref.
United States	January 2, 1993	7-inch vinyl; 12-inch vinyl; CD; cassette	Arista	
Sweden	January 11, 1993	CD	Arista	
United Kingdom	February 8, 1993	7-inch vinyl; 12-inch vinyl; CD; cassette	Arista	
Australia	February 14, 1993	Cassette	Arista	
Australia	March 7, 1993	12-inch vinyl	Arista	
Japan	March 24, 1993	Mini-CD	Arista	

== Other versions ==
After the popularity of the Whitney Houston version, The Oprah Winfrey Show unveiled its "I'm Every Woman" campaign in the 1993–94 season, using a cover version with remade lyrics in promos and an instrumental rendition used as the theme song. Girls Aloud covered "I'm Every Woman" on the UK Discomania album released in 2004. In 2006, it was recorded in the fifth season of American Idol by Mandisa, and put on the album American Idol Season 5: Encores. Country pop singer and songwriter Taylor Swift also recorded the song when she was trying to get a record label.

== See also ==
- List of number-one R&B singles of 1978 (U.S.)
- List of UK top 10 singles in 1989
- List of number-one dance singles of 1993 (U.S.)
- Top 50 Singles of 1993 (UK)
- List of RPM number-one dance singles of 1993
- Billboard Year-End Hot 100 singles of 1993
- List of Cash Box Top 100 number-one singles of 1993
