= Clivillés and Cole =

American music production duo

Robert Clivillés (born July 30, 1964) and David Cole (1962–1995), known collectively as Clivillés and Cole, were American record producers, songwriters, and remixers active from the late 1980s who achieved success in the 1990s.

== Career ==
=== Beginnings ===
David Cole and Robert Clivillés both performed in club Better Days (Clivillés as DJ and Cole as keyboardist) in the late 1980s. They become friends following a joint DJ session at Better Days club. Their first official released collaboration was a 1986 remix of the song "It's Too Late (For Love)" by Stardom Groove, featuring Tonya Wynne. In the late 1980s, Clivillés and Cole were active in the groups 2 Puerto Ricans, a Blackman, and a Dominican and the 28th Street Crew. At the time they were the driving force of the short-lived Brat Pack. The duo were also responsible for the formation of pop group Seduction, for whom they wrote and produced a string of Top-10 hits. They contributed to the career of former the Weather Girls vocalist Martha Wash, who at the same time was one of the lead vocalists for the dance act Black Box. In 1990, Clivillés and Cole released a single featuring later C+C Music Factory rapper Freedom Williams, called "Get Dumb! (Free Your Body)", as the Crew. The duo's biggest success, however, was the group C+C Music Factory, which became a worldwide sensation in 1991.

=== Production and songwriting work ===
Mariah Carey worked extensively with Clivillés + Cole, (Note: In addition, C+C vocalist Deborah Cooper is a frequent background vocalist on Mariah Carey's singles, albums, and tours internationally with her as a live background vocalist.) hiring the duo to produce songs for her albums and remix her singles. Clivillés + Cole produced and co-wrote the album versions and remixes of her hit singles "Emotions" and "Make It Happen". Additionally, they produced the album tracks "You're So Cold" and "To Be Around You" (all from the album Emotions). They also produced the remixes of her hit "Anytime You Need a Friend", the originals "Now That I Know" and "I've Been Thinking About You" (from the album Music Box) and the original and remixes to "Joy to the World" (from the album Merry Christmas). The single "One Sweet Day" was written in memory of David Cole after his death in 1995.

Among the hits remixed by the duo Clivillés & Cole were Natalie Cole's cover of "Pink Cadillac", Taylor Dayne's "Can't Get Enough of Your Love", Lisa Lisa and Cult Jam's "Let the Beat Hit 'Em", The Cover Girls' "My Heart Skips a Beat" and "All That Glitters Isn't Gold", Pajama Party's "Hide and Seek", Sandée's "Notice Me", and Michael Jackson's "Black or White". They left their mark on the progressive synth-pop scene with a complete reworking of The Communards' "There's More to Love Than Boy Meets Girl." The group Seduction was one of Clivilles + Cole's most successful side projects.

In the summer of 1991, Clivillés + Cole produced several tracks for a New Kids on the Block remix album titled No More Games: The Remix Album. (Note: Among the tracks, the hit title remixed by Clivillés + Cole, titled "Games," hit #14 on the UK Singles Chart. The album peaked at #10 on the US Billboard 200 album chart, selling more than 500,000 albums and was certified Gold by the RIAA.)

In 1992, Clivillés + Cole produced Whitney Houston's top 10 single "I'm Every Woman", originally by Chaka Khan.

In 1994, the duo produced a radio version of Jim Carrey's performance of "Cuban Pete" from the movie The Mask. (Note: The single included a C+C club mix.)

=== "A Deeper Love" ===
In 1991, as Clivillés + Cole, the duo released an LP-single A-side featuring a cover of U2's "Pride (In the Name of Love)", but it was the B-side, "A Deeper Love", featuring vocals by Deborah Cooper (a longtime Clivillés and Cole vocalist) and Paul Pesco, that proved to be a hit, peaking at No. 15 in the UK. Deborah Cooper performed "Deeper Love" various times, including on Saturday Night Live with Clivillés and Cole's C+C Music Factory. Both sides charted on the Billboard Hot 100 in the spring of 1992: "A Deeper Love" peaked at #44, while "Pride (In the Name of Love)" reached #54. The video for these songs was actually one long featurette, beginning with "Deeper Love" and then continuing into "Pride (In the Name of Love)" halfway through the video. The video was labelled "Pride (A Deeper Love)". Some networks preferred to show the videos separately while others played the whole length. In 1992 as Clivillés + Cole, an album was released called Greatest Remixes Vol. 1, featuring remixes by the duo of their own songs along with other artists' songs.

In 1994, Aretha Franklin covered "A Deeper Love" from the film Sister Act 2: Back in the Habit. (Note: The single was later released as the lead single of her Greatest Hits (1980–1994) collection.) Franklin actually hired Clivillés + Cole to produce the album version as well as the remixes. Thus, the song was a hit for the duo twice in two different incarnations within a 3-year time span.

=== Other projects ===
In 1992, as Clivillés + Cole, an album was released, titled Greatest Remixes Vol. 1, featuring remixes by the duo of their own songs along with other artists' songs.

Also in 1992, the duo assembled the R&B/dance group The S.O.U.L. S.Y.S.T.E.M.; only one song by this group was ever released, titled "It's Gonna Be a Lovely Day", which featured on the #1 soundtrack album "The Bodyguard". An uptempo vocal club remix of the song was released as a promo single by Arista Records.

Clivillés and Cole released a new single under the moniker The 28th Street Crew called O in 1994. That same year, the duo produced a song for El General titled "Las Chicas", which borrowed heavily from the song "Boriqua Anthem" off the C+C Music Factory album Anything Goes!.

Since David Cole's death, Robert Clivillés has continued to produce on his own, including work for the group MVP, an album release in 1996 on Columbia under the moniker Robi Rob's Club World, and various other releases under different names.

== Discography ==
=== Compilations ===
Year	Album details	Peak chart positions
Year	Album details	AUS
1992	Greatest Remixes Vol. 1: Compilation; Release date: 1992; Label: Columbia	43

=== Singles ===
Year	Single	Peak positions									Album
Year	Single	UK	IRE	NED	BEL (FLA)	GER	SWI	AUS	NZ	US	Album
1992	"Pride (In the Name of Love)"	15	5	54	—	—	27	12	15	54	Greatest Remixes Vol. 1
1992	"A Deeper Love"	15	—	6	22	35	—	85	—	44	Greatest Remixes Vol. 1
