= A Deeper Love =

1991 single by Clivillés & Cole

Single by Clivillés & Cole
- Released: 1991
- Genre: Dance
- Length: 5:36
- Label: Columbia
- Songwriters: Robert Clivillés; David Cole
- Producers: Robert Clivillés; David Cole

Music video
- "A Deeper Love" on YouTube

"A Deeper Love" is a song written by American producers Robert Clivillés and David Cole, and performed by them as Clivillés & Cole featuring vocals by Deborah Cooper. Released by Columbia Records in 1991, the song was the duo's fifth number-one on the US Billboard Hot Dance Club Play chart. On other US charts, "A Deeper Love" peaked at number 83 on the soul singles chart and number 44 on the pop chart. Overseas, especially in Europe the single charted higher, going to number 15 in the UK and number eight on the Dutch Top 40.

Originally, Clivilles & Cole released an LP-single A-side that had their version of U2's "Pride (In the Name of Love)", featuring Deborah Cooper and Paul Pesco, which peaked at number six on the US dance chart as well as peaking at number 54 on the Billboard Hot 100.

== Critical reception ==
Clark and DeVaney from Cash Box wrote, "This single is your basic "house, club-styled" cut that will easily find its way into the club scene after the buzz starts. The 'Radio Edit Remix' has a lot more sounds in it, and would be preferred for radio play." Pan-European magazine Music & Media commented, that here, C&C Music Factory "do what the Pet Shop Boys ('Where the Streets Have No Name') did before them—adapt a song of world's leading rock band U2 and take it to the dance floor. The gospel-framed arrangement makes their version particularly interesting." Andy Beevers from Music Week said that "just when 'Pride' has dropped from the charts, its B-side (which was the track most DJs were playing anyway) re-appears as a single in its own right. The brand new 12 minute long Deeper Feeling remix, executed by C&C themselves. is even more anthemic than the original and is strong enough to take the song back into the Top 40. Well, it worked for 'Black and White'." Jonathan Bernstein from Spin wrote, "Criminally, Clivilles & Cole's epic 'A Deeper Love' saw little chart action. No other record this year delivered as phenomenally in terms of dynamic performance. In this instance, the public failed."

In 2004, Slant Magazine ranked the song number five in their list of "The 100 Greatest Dance Songs of All Time". In 2020, the magazine ranked it number 16 in their list of "The 100 Best Dance Songs of All Time".

== Music video ==
The music video for these songs was actually one long featurette, beginning with "Deeper Love" and then continuing into "Pride (In The Name Of Love)" halfway through the video. The video was labelled "Pride (A Deeper Love)".

== Track listing ==
CD single, Australia (1991)
No.	Title	Length
1.	"A Deeper Love" (Radio Version)
2.	"A Deeper Love" (Radio Edit Remix)
3.	"A Deeper Love" (Ballad Radio Edit)

CD single, UK & Europe (1992)
No.	Title	Length
1.	"A Deeper Love" (Radio Version)	4:21
2.	"A Deeper Love" (A Deeper Feeling Mix)	12:05
3.	"A Deeper Love" (Underground Club Mix / Let's Go Chanting - Continuous Play)	12:20
4.	"A Deeper Love" (Ballad Radio Edit)	4:36

== Charts ==
=== Weekly charts ===
Weekly chart performance for "A Deeper Love"
Chart (1992)	Peak position
Australia (ARIA)	85
Belgium (Ultratop 50 Flanders)	22
Europe (Eurochart Hot 100)	42
Europe (European Dance Radio)	4
Finland (IFPI)	3
Germany (GfK)	35
Israel (Israeli Singles Chart)	20
Netherlands (Dutch Top 40)	8
Netherlands (Single Top 100)	6
Spain (AFYVE)	9
UK Singles (Official Charts)	15
UK Airplay (Music Week)	41
UK Dance (Music Week)	2
UK Club Chart (Music Week)	1
US Hot Dance Club Play (Billboard)	1

=== Year-end charts ===
Year-end chart performance for "A Deeper Love"
Chart (1992)	Position
UK Club Chart (Music Week)	1

== Aretha Franklin version ==
"A Deeper Love"

Single by Aretha Franklin

from the album Greatest Hits: 1980-1994 and Sister Act 2: Back in the Habit Soundtrack
- Released: January 31, 1994
- Genre: Dance-pop; diva house; gospel
- Length: 4:34
- Label: Arista
- Songwriter: Clivillés & Cole
- Producer: C+C Music Factory

Aretha Franklin singles chronology
"Someday We'll All Be Free" (1992)	"A Deeper Love" (1994)	"Willing to Forgive" (1994)

Music video
- "A Deeper Love" on YouTube

In 1994, American singer and songwriter Aretha Franklin covered "A Deeper Love" featuring a backing vocal by Lisa Fischer; this version was also produced by Clivillés & Cole and was later released on January 31, 1994, by Arista Records, as the lead single of her Greatest Hits (1980–1994) collection. The Aretha Franklin version also went to number one on the US dance charts for two weeks. This made Franklin one of the few artists to have a number one Billboard hit in four decades or more. On other US charts, "A Deeper Love" went to number 30 on the soul singles chart and number 63 on the Billboard Hot 100 as well as being featured in a special remix played over the end credits to Sister Act 2: Back in the Habit. The accompanying music video was directed by Greg Gold. The song was also nominated for a Grammy Award in the category for Best Female R&B Vocal Performance, but lost to "Breathe Again" by Toni Braxton.

=== Critical reception ===
Larry Flick from Billboard magazine wrote that here, the massive 1992 club hit for Clivillés & Cole "gets a dynamic, melodramatic reading from the Queen of Soul", describing it as "gospel-soaked" and stating further that the album version "sticks fairly close in style to the original record, with myriad remixes traveling down a variety of more current, trend-conscious roads. C&C deliver an abundance of slammin' sounds that are over-the-top enough to keep up with La Franklin's vocal." Alexis Petridis from The Guardian named it a "great excursion into house music", noting that "picking up on the religious undercurrent of the lyrics, she shifts from scat singing to fervent gospel sermonising". Pan-European magazine Music & Media commented, "What would good old Jerry Wexler think of this? The Queen of the Atlantic soul now offers her services to C&C's dance hit factory."

Andy Beevers from Music Week gave the song a top score of five out of five, stating that it "manages to be even more uplifting" than the 1992 original, and "has all the hallmarks of a big hit." Karen Holmes from The Network Forty felt that here, the singer "waves her magical wand again with a brilliant rendition that transcends any format restrictions. Taking the best of what we remember her for, then adding a little more spice than in recent projects, this track targets all demos." Terry Staunton from NME concluded, "This finds Aretha in fine voice and will do very well." Dutch NOS/Hilversum DJ/producer Tom Blomberg was continually struck by Franklin's "incredible gospel-esque" vocals. He said, "That dance groove is still very acceptable for radio. Besides, it's no longer 1967, technique has developed since then, so why wouldn't she benefit from that?" Adam Higginbotham from Select stated that it "is great". Tony Cross from Smash Hits gave Franklin's version three out of five, writing that "the grandmother of soul has belted it out big style. It's just what you'd expect, a real soul sisters' smash with gospel girls that have thrown away their hymn sheets for something fun and funky. Go for it, grandma."

=== Music video ===
The music video for "A Deeper Love" was directed by Greg Gold and filmed on location in Chicago. It features Franklin wearing large earrings and a white sweater, performing in an urban city setting. Sometimes, she also wears a black hat. Parts of the video have a sepia tone and also features footage from Sister Act 2: Back in the Habit. In many scenes there are a crowd of young people dancing, singing and clapping in unison along to the performance by Franklin. In Europe, "A Deeper Love" was B-listed on German music television channel VIVA in April 1994. Four months later, it was A-listed on France's MCM.

=== Impact and legacy ===
"A Deeper Love" was awarded one of ASCAP's Rhythm & Soul Awards in 1995. Same year, it was nominated for a Grammy Award in the category for Best Female R&B Vocal Performance, losing to "Breathe Again" by Toni Braxton. In 2014, UK magazine Fact ranked the song number five in their list of "21 Diva-House Belters That Still Sound Incredible". In 2022, Billboard magazine ranked it number 38 and 42 in their lists of "Top 50 Dance Remixes of Classic Hits" and "Best LGBTQ Anthems of All Time", while in 2025, the song was ranked number 74 in their "The 100 Greatest LGBTQ+ Anthems of All Time"-list.

=== Accolades ===
Year	Nominee / work	Award	Result
1995	"A Deeper Love"	Grammy Award for Best Female R&B Vocal Performance	Nominated

=== Track listings ===
CD single, Europe (1994)
No.	Title	Length
1.	"A Deeper Love" (C+C Radio Mix)	4:34
2.	"A Deeper Love" (C+C Music Factory Mix)	12:05
3.	"A Deeper Love" (Tribesman Mix)	11:19
4.	"A Deeper Love" (A Deeper Mix)	11:59

CD maxi, US (1994)
No.	Title	Length
1.	"A Deeper Love" (C+C Hot Mix)	4:41
2.	"A Deeper Love" (Single Mix)	4:34
3.	"A Deeper Love" (Morales Single Mix)	4:24
4.	"A Deeper Love" (Tribesman Mix)	11:19
5.	"A Deeper Love" (C+C Music Factory Mix)	12:05

=== Charts ===
==== Weekly charts ====
Weekly chart performance for "A Deeper Love"
Chart (1994)	Peak position
Belgium (Ultratop Flanders)	15
Europe (Eurochart Hot 100)	12
Europe (European Dance Radio)	2
Europe (European Hit Radio)	17
Finland (Suomen virallinen lista)	12
France (SNEP)	34
Germany (Official German Charts)	78
Iceland (Íslenski Listinn Topp 40)	13
Ireland (IRMA)	30
Israel (Israeli Singles Chart)	19
Netherlands (Dutch Top 40)	31
Netherlands (Single Top 100)	34
Scotland (OCC)	24
Spain (AFYVE)	7
UK Singles (OCC)	5
UK Airplay (Music Week)	3
UK Dance (Music Week)	1
UK Club Chart (Music Week)	1
US Billboard Hot 100	63
US Dance Singles Sales (Billboard)	1
US Hot Dance Club Play (Billboard)	1
US Cash Box Top 100	56

==== Year-end charts ====
Year-end chart performance for "A Deeper Love"
Chart (1994)	Position
UK Singles (OCC)	100
UK Airplay (Music Week)	29
UK Club Chart (Music Week)	25
US Hot Dance Music Club/Play (Billboard)	4
US Maxi-Singles Sales (Billboard)	16

== What Can We Do (A Deeper Love) ==
"What Can We Do (A Deeper Love)"

Single by Tiësto

from the album Club Life, Vol. 2 - Miami
- Released: December 27, 2011
- Recorded: 2011
- Genre: Progressive house
- Length: 3:48 (Radio Mix); 5:56 (Original Mix)
- Label: Musical Freedom; PIAS
- Songwriters: Robert Clivillés; David Cole; Tijs Verwest; Anastacia Lyn Newkirk
- Producer: Tiësto

Tiësto singles chronology
"The First Note Is Silent" (2011)	"What Can We Do (A Deeper Love)" (2011)	"We Own the Night" (2012)

Music video
- "What Can We Do (A Deeper Love)" on YouTube

"What Can We Do (A Deeper Love)" is a song by Dutch disc jockey and producer Tiësto with uncredited vocals from American singer Anastacia. It was released on December 27, 2011, in the Netherlands. It is the second single from the Tiësto mixed compilation Club Life, Vol. 2 - Miami. But, it's the Third Party remix of the song which is included in the album.

=== Background and release ===
Tiësto and Anastacia sampled the Aretha Franklin version of "A Deeper Love" to use the chorus in their song. The song was featured in commercials for Škoda Auto. Anastacia later released a solo version during the summer of 2012.

=== Music video ===
The music video premiered on Tiësto's official YouTube channel on January 20, 2012.

=== Track listing ===
- Digital download (MF038)
1. "What Can We Do (A Deeper Love)" (Radio Mix) – 3:48
2. "What Can We Do (A Deeper Love)" (Third Party Remix) – 6:26
3. "What Can We Do (A Deeper Love)" (Extended Mix) – 5:56
- Digital download / Anastacia's 2012 solo pop version (BMG)
1. "What Can We Do (Deeper Love)" – 3:26

== Other cover versions ==
- In 2012 the EDM band Apollo 440 released a version of the song titled "A Deeper Dub" on their album "The Future's What It Used To Be".
- In 2015 house producer Jauz released a remake of the song. With no additional vocals, just a change of genre.
- In 2017, Riton, MNEK, & The House Gospel Choir covered the chorus in their track "Deeper."
- In 2018, Berlin based producer and composer Tinush used Aretha's vocal samples to produce his version "Struggle".
- In 2019, Melanie C performed the song on her global Pride tour.

== See also ==
- List of number-one dance singles of 1992 (U.S.)
- List of number-one dance singles of 1994 (U.S.)
