= Magic Carpet Ride (Mighty Dub Katz song) =

Single by Mighty Dub Katz
- B-side: "Remix"
- Released: 1995
- Genre: House
- Length: 3:52
- Label: Sm:)e Communications; Orange Records; Work Records; Airplay Records
- Songwriter: Norman Cook
- Producer: Pizzaman

Music video
- "Magic Carpet Ride" on YouTube

"Magic Carpet Ride" is a song by British duo Mighty Dub Katz, which consisted of DJ, musician and record producer Norman Cook and his former flatmate Gareth Hansome (a.k.a. GMoney). It was first released in 1995 and peaked within the top 10 in Germany, the Netherlands, Spain and Switzerland. The song's melody is based on a sample of Chakachas' recording "Yo Soy Cubano" from 1970, and Sandee's recording "Notice Me" from 1988. The male vocals are based on Laid Back's "White Horse" from 1983. A black-and-white music video was shot to accompany the song.

== Critical reception ==
The NME made the song single of the week, saying that it was a piece of "pure sunshine". Larry Flick from Billboard magazine wrote that this "kitchen-sink instrumental from the ever-experimental mind of producer Norman Cook combines elements of disco and merengue-with the occasional splash electro-pop. The end result is a quirky, but endearing jam that will enjoy a nice run on the turntables of adventurous DJs." He also concluded, "File this one under "happy house" and twirl on, children." Pan-European magazine Music & Media described the song as a "Latin house trinket". On the 1997 re-release, Daisy & Havoc from Music Week's RM Dance Update gave it a full score of five out of five, adding, "This brilliant unusual track should be a surprise to very few people – it's been around for years. [...] Presumably they're after a summer hit with this one and it's well deserved – nothing else sounds like it or lasts like it."

== Chart performance ==
"Magic Carpet Ride" enjoyed massive success in both clubs and on the chart all over the world. It peaked at number-one on the RPM Dance/Urban chart in Canada in January 1996, with one week at the top. In Europe, the single was a top-10 hit in Germany, the Netherlands, Spain and Switzerland. In Norway and Austria, it reached the top 20, while it was a top-30 hit in Iceland, Sweden and the UK, where it peaked at number 24 in 1997. On the Eurochart Hot 100, the single reached its highest position as number 33 in March 1996.

== Influence and legacy ==
Tomorrowland voted "Magic Carpet Ride" number 97 in their official list of "The Ibiza 500" in 2020.

== Track listing ==
- 12" single, Germany (1995)
1. "Magic Carpet Ride" (Ulti-Mix) – 6:02
2. "Magic Carpet Ride" (Son of Wilmot Mix) – 7:29
- CD single, Europe (1995)
1. "Magic Carpet Ride" (No Comprende Edit) – 3:50
2. "Magic Carpet Ride" (Ulti-Edit) – 3:58
3. "Magic Carpet Ride" (Ulti-Mix) – 6:02
4. "Magic Carpet Ride" (Son of Wilmot Mix) – 7:29
5. "Magic Carpet Ride" (Original Version) – 8:06
- CD maxi, Netherlands (1995)
1. "Magic Carpet Ride" (Radio Edit) – 3:52
2. "Magic Carpet Ride" (Son of Wilmot Mix) – 7:33
3. "Magic Carpet Ride" (Work Remix) – 6:03
4. "Magic Carpet Ride" (Original Version) – 8:08
- CD maxi, France (1995)
1. "Magic Carpet Ride" (Radio Edit) – 4:30
2. "Magic Carpet Ride" (Vocoder Club Mix) – 8:13
3. "Son of Wilmot" (No Comprende Mix) – 7:29

== Charts ==
=== Weekly charts ===
Chart (1995–96)	Peak position
Austria (Ö3 Austria Top 40)	15
Canada Dance/Urban (RPM)	1
Estonia (Eesti Top 20)	1
Europe (Eurochart Hot 100)	33
Europe (European Dance Radio)	15
Germany (GfK)	9
Iceland (Íslenski Listinn Topp 40)	22
Netherlands (Dutch Top 40)	10
Netherlands (Single Top 100)	9
Norway (VG-lista)	18
Spain (AFYVE)	9
Sweden (Sverigetopplistan)	26
Switzerland (Schweizer Hitparade)	9
US Dance Club Play (Billboard)	9
US Maxi-Singles Sales (Billboard)	20
US Cash Box Top 100	56

Chart (1997)	Peak position
Europe (Eurochart Hot 100)	47
Scottish Singles Sales (Official Charts)	34
UK Singles (Official Charts)	24
UK Dance (OCC)	2

=== Year-end charts ===
Chart (1995)	Position
Canada Dance/Urban (RPM)	27

Chart (1996)	Position
Switzerland (Schweizer Hitparade)	48

Chart (1997)	Position
UK Club Chart (Music Week)	41
