= Keep It Comin' (Dance Till You Can't Dance No More) =

1992 single by C+C Music Factory

Single by C+C Music Factory featuring Q-Unique and Deborah Cooper

from the album Buffy the Vampire Slayer soundtrack
- Released: 1992
- Genre: Dance; gospel
- Length: 3:56 (radio mix); 3:20 (pop radio mix)
- Label: Columbia
- Songwriters: Robert Clivillés; Anthony Quiles; Duran Ramos; David Cole
- Producers: David Cole; Robert Clivillés

C+C Music Factory singles chronology
"Just a Touch of Love" (1991)	"Keep It Comin' (Dance Till You Can't Dance No More)" (1992)	"Do You Wanna Get Funky" (1994)

Music video
- "Keep It Comin' (Dance Till You Can't Dance No More)" on YouTube

"Keep It Comin' (Dance Till You Can't Dance No More)" is a song by American musical group C+C Music Factory featuring vocals by Q-Unique and Deborah Cooper. It was released as a single in 1992 by Columbia Records and is co-written and produced by Robert Clivillés and David Cole. In the US, it went to number one on the Billboard Hot Dance Club Play chart. The song is featured in the 1992 film Buffy the Vampire Slayer and its accompanying soundtrack.

== Critical reception ==
Larry Flick from Billboard magazine wrote that the song "is a direct descendent" of "Gonna Make You Sweat", stating that "this pleasing track has all of the rousing gospel elements required to fill dancefloors". He added that "this jam is etched with more of a streetwise vibe. Rapper Q-Unique runs lyrical rings around the now-departed Freedom Williams, and Deborah Cooper proves to be a well-seasoned belter." John Martinucci from the Gavin Report commented, "Though the Music Factory has had personnel changes, the technical aspects of the group don't miss a beat. Rapper Q-Unique and vocalist Deborah Cooper sound comfortable in their new surroundings".

== Track listings ==
- US 12-inch vinyl

A1. "Keep It Comin' (Dance Till You Can't Dance No More)" (C&C club mix)
A2. "Keep It Comin' (Dance Till You Can't Dance No More)" (Straight Outta Da Bronx mix)
B1. "Keep It Comin' (Dance Till You Can't Dance No More)" (The Cole & Clivilles house anthem)
B2. "Keep It Comin' (Dance Till You Can't Dance No More)" (A Capella Pieces)

- CD single
1. "Keep It Comin' (Dance Till You Can't Dance No More)" (pop radio mix)
2. "Keep It Comin' (Dance Till You Can't Dance No More)" (radio mix)
3. "Keep It Comin' (Dance Till You Can't Dance No More)" (extended mix)

== Charts ==
=== Weekly charts ===
Chart (1992)	Peak position
Australia (ARIA)	46
Europe (Eurochart Hot 100)	58
Europe (European Dance Radio)	4
Finland (Suomen virallinen lista)	11
Netherlands (Dutch Top 40)	25
Netherlands (Single Top 100)	30
New Zealand (Recorded Music NZ)	17
Norway (VG-lista)	9
UK Singles (Official Charts)	34
UK Dance (Music Week)	6
UK Club Chart (Music Week)	3
US Billboard Hot 100	83
US Hot Dance Club Play (Billboard)	1
US Cash Box Top 100	86

=== Year-end charts ===
Chart (1992)	Position
UK Club Chart (Music Week)	21

== Release history ==
Region	Date	Format(s)	Label(s)	Ref.
United States	1992	12-inch vinyl; CD; cassette	Columbia	
Australia	August 31, 1992	CD; cassette	Columbia	
United Kingdom	September 21, 1992	7-inch vinyl; 12-inch vinyl; CD; cassette	Columbia	
Japan	October 1, 1992	CD	Sony	
