= Do You Wanna Get Funky =

1994 single by C+C Music Factory

Single by C+C Music Factory

from the album Anything Goes!
- Released: July 18, 1994
- Genre: Dance; ragga; hip hop
- Length: 4:04
- Label: Columbia
- Songwriters: David Cole; Robert Clivillés
- Producers: David Cole; Robert Clivillés

C+C Music Factory singles chronology
| "Keep It Comin' (Dance Till You Can't Dance No More)" (1992) | "Do You Wanna Get Funky" (1994) | "Take a Toke" (1994) |

Music video
- "Do You Wanna Get Funky" on YouTube

"Do You Wanna Get Funky" is a song by American dance music group C+C Music Factory featuring vocals from Martha Wash, Zelma Davis, and Trilogy. It was both written and produced by David Cole and Robert Clivillés, and released in July 1994 by Columbia Records as the lead single from the group's second album, Anything Goes! (1994).

The single reached number 40 on the US Billboard Hot 100 and topped both the Billboard Dance Club Play chart and the Canadian RPM Dance chart. In Europe and Oceania, it was a hit in several countries, peaking at number two in New Zealand, number five in Finland, number 11 in Australia, and number 18 in the Netherlands. Keir McFarlane directed the song's accompanying music video, featuring the artists performing in a nightclub. "Do You Wanna Get Funky" was awarded one of ASCAP's Rhythm & Soul Awards in 1995.

== Composition ==
Sampling Nice & Smooth's "Hip Hop Junkies", "Do You Wanna Get Funky" is a Snoop Doggy Dogg-esque ragga, hip hop, and P-funk track "with highly charged vocal performances" and "a slick and insinuating groove that is padded with ear-pleasing synth lines". In April 1994, Billboard magazine reported that "Clivilles has gleefully dubbed [it] 'a real booty song'."

== Critical reception ==
Larry Flick from Billboard magazine praised "Do You Wanna Get Funky", predicting that its "killer hook and a memorable refrain" will "push the act up the charts once again". Troy J. Augusto from Cash Box named it Pick of the Week and highlighted its "heavy-duty dance groove, some tasty toast-vox from Trilogy and a heaping helping of Ms. Wash’s operatic voice". He also suggested the "fiery track" could be a hit on "a large cross-section of contemporary radio". Pan-European magazine Music & Media wrote, "When was the last C&C hit? In other words, high time for a new one." Brad Beatnik from Music Week's RM Dance Update named it the best cut "on a rather patchy new album", positively commenting on the choice of sample and "superb diva vocals from Martha Wash and Zelma Davis".

== Music video ==
The music video for "Do You Wanna Get Funky" was directed by Keir McFarlane, depicting the artists and musicians performing at a round-shaped dancefloor inside a nightclub. It includes Martha Wash for the first time in a video by C+C Music Factory. "Do You Wanna Get Funky" was nominated for Best Clip of the Year in the category for R&B/Urban at the 1994 Billboard Music Video Awards. In Europe, the video was B-listed on French and German music television channels MCM and VIVA in October 1994.

== Track listings ==
- 12-inch maxi, US (1994)
1. "Do You Wanna Get Funky" (The C&C Sound Factory house mix) – 8:20
2. "Do You Wanna Get Funky" (The Ministry of Sound mix) – 7:58
- CD single, UK and Europe (1994)
1. "Do You Wanna Get Funky" (C+C radio mix) – 4:04
2. "Do You Wanna Get Funky" (Ministry of Sound house mix) – 8:00
3. "Do You Wanna Get Funky" (Mark the 45 King remix) – 5:29
4. "Do You Wanna Get Funky" (C.J.'s full length version) – 9:35
5. "Do You Wanna Get Funky" (C.J.'s Funky Organ Vox dub) – 9:03
- CD maxi, US (1994)
1. "Do You Wanna Get Funky" (vocal club mix) – 4:29
2. "Do You Wanna Get Funky" (Mark the 45 King remix) – 5:28
3. "Do You Wanna Get Funky" (a cappella) – 4:02
4. "Do You Wanna Get Funky" (The C+C Sound Factory house mix) – 8:20
5. "Do You Wanna Get Funky" (The Ministry of Sound house mix) – 7:58

== Charts ==
=== Weekly charts ===
Weekly chart performance for "Do You Wanna Get Funky"
| Chart (1994) | Peak position |
|---|---|
| Australia (ARIA) | 11 |
| Belgium (Ultratop 50 Flanders) | 38 |
| Canada Retail Singles (The Record) | 4 |
| Canada Top Singles (RPM) | 74 |
| Canada Dance/Urban (RPM) | 1 |
| Europe (Eurochart Hot 100) | 41 |
| Europe (European Dance Radio) | 1 |
| Europe (European Hit Radio) | 36 |
| Finland (Suomen virallinen lista) | 5 |
| Germany (GfK) | 41 |
| Iceland (Íslenski Listinn Topp 40) | 33 |
| Israel (Israeli Singles Chart) | 23 |
| Netherlands (Dutch Top 40) | 24 |
| Netherlands (Single Top 100) | 18 |
| New Zealand (Recorded Music NZ) | 2 |
| Scottish Singles Sales (Official Charts) | 42 |
| Sweden (Sverigetopplistan) | 37 |
| UK Singles (Official Charts) | 27 |
| UK Dance (Official Charts) | 6 |
| UK Dance (Music Week) | 6 |
| UK Club Chart (Music Week) | 4 |
| US Billboard Hot 100 | 40 |
| US Dance Club Play (Billboard) | 1 |
| US Hot R&B Singles (Billboard) | 11 |
| US Maxi-Singles Sales (Billboard) | 4 |
| US Top 40/Rhythm-Crossover (Billboard) | 14 |
| US Cash Box Top 100 | 32 |

=== Year-end charts ===
Year-end chart performance for "Do You Wanna Get Funky"
| Chart (1994) | Position |
|---|---|
| Australia (ARIA) | 58 |
| Canada Dance/Urban (RPM) | 3 |
| Europe (European Dance Radio) | 8 |
| New Zealand (RIANZ) | 15 |
| US Dance Club Play (Billboard) | 16 |
| US Hot R&B Singles (Billboard) | 56 |
| US Maxi-Singles Sales (Billboard) | 22 |
| US Urban Singles (Cash Box) | 38 |

== Certifications ==
Certifications and sales for "Do You Wanna Get Funky"
| Region | Certification | Certified units/sales |
|---|---|---|
| Australia (ARIA) | Gold | 35,000^{^} |
^{^} Shipments figures based on certification alone.

== Release history ==
Release dates and formats for "Do You Wanna Get Funky"
| Region | Date | Format(s) | Label(s) | Ref. |
|---|---|---|---|---|
| United States | July 18, 1994 | Radio | Columbia | |
| Japan | July 21, 1994 | CD | Sony | |
| Australia | July 25, 1994 | 12-inch vinyl; CD; cassette | Columbia | |
| United Kingdom | August 15, 1994 | 12-inch vinyl; CD; cassette | Columbia | |
