= 157 Shelter Records =

New York-based house music label founded by Freddy Sanon

- Founded: 1992
- Founder: Freddy Sanon
- Genre: House, deep house, soul
- Country of origin: US
- Location: New York

157 Shelter Records is a New York-based house music label founded by Freddy Sanon.

== History ==
In the early 90s, initial tracks were manufactured and distributed by Polar Records Inc, a label created by then partners Manny Diaz and Freddy Sanon. Shortly thereafter, new tracks were released under Sanon’s own label Shelter Records. 157 Shelter Records is closely affiliated with The Shelter, a New York-based house music club founded by Timmy Regisford, Merlin Bobb, and Freddy Sanon.

As explained by Sanon, both The Shelter and 157 Shelter Records name derived from a need to find a place to call home after the Paradise Garage closed. The feeling of homelessness led them to find ‘’’The Shelter’’’ where people could come to feel special and let loose no matter their background. That feeling translated to the label due to Sanon’s carefully selected singles that contained the energy of deep house and a general feeling of unity and inclusion.

Notable releases: “Alright” by Urban Soul. “That’s How Much I Love You” by Ambrosia and Big Moses. “How Deep is Your Love” by Blaze featuring Alexander Hope. “When I Think of You” by Kerri Chandler. “I Get Deep” by Roland Clark (Sampled by Fatboy Slim on Star 69/Weapon of Choice and Song for Shelter/Ya Mama as well as Swish Swish by Katy Perry).

== Associated Artist ==
Ambrosia, Blaze, Big Moses, Boyd Jarvis, DJ Camacho, Eddie Perez, Glenn Underground, Kerri Chandler, Quentin Harris, Roland Clark, Timmy Regisford

== Associated Labels ==
Devotion Records, Luv Dancin Records, Polar Records Inc., Restricted Access, Restricted Tracks, Trinity Records, Un-Restricted Access, Underground Access
