= C+C Music Factory (album) =

1995 studio album by C+C Music Factory

Studio album by C+C Music Factory
- Released: December 5, 1995
- Recorded: 1995
- Genre: Dance, house
- Length: 73:30
- Label: MCA
- Producer: Robert Clivillés

C+C Music Factory chronology
Anything Goes! (1994)	C+C Music Factory (1995)

Singles from C+C Music Factory
- 1. "I'll Always Be Around" Released: 1995

Professional ratings
Review scores
Source	Rating
Allmusic	2.5/5 stars

C+C Music Factory is the third and final studio album of new material to be recorded by C+C Music Factory. The album was not released in the United States. This was the group's first album since the death of David Cole.

== Track listing ==
1. "What Can I Do (To Make You Stay)" - 4:08
2. "Don't Stop the Music" (featuring Charlie Brown and Greg Nice) - 4:12
3. "I'll Always Be Around" - 4:31
4. "Loving You" - 4:30
5. "Searching" - 4:20
6. "Till the End of Time" - 4:56
7. "Still" - 5:30
8. "I Wanna Blow Your Mind" - 5:53
9. "It's So Easy to Love You" - 3:57
10. "Musica es mi vida" (Robi-Rob's Boriqua Anthem Part 2) - 20:23
11. "Latinos del mundo (Siguen Bailando)" - 11:10
