= The Shelter (New York City) =

Nightclub in New York City

Coordinates: 40°43′17.51″N 74°0′31.06″W

The Shelter, also known as Club Shelter, is a New York City dance music and house music nightclub started during the 1990s. The club was at multiple locations including 6 Hubert Street, 157 Hudson Street, and 150 Varick Street in Manhattan depending on the date. The Shelter was established by resident DJs Timmy Regisford, Merlin Bobb, and Freddy Sanon. The club is closely associated with record label 157 Shelter Records.

== History ==
In 1991, The Shelter opened after Paradise Garage closed. It became a sanctuary where its patrons could express themselves, and race and sexual orientation did not matter. In 1992, Newsday described singer Moi Renée as the club's "reigning diva".

The Shelter's most active promoters and DJs were collectively known as "N.A.S.A." (Nocturnal Audio + Sensory Awakening), who hosted Friday night parties at the club. The dance floor had an incredibly loud 37,000-watt sound system, installed by David Soto, who joined the project through Garage-era DJ legend Timmy Regisford. The speaker cabinets were larger than the dancers.

== In popular culture ==
In the 1995 independent film Kids, one of the main characters go to The Shelter to find their friend and pop pills.

== DJs ==
Resident and Guest DJs include:

- Timmy Regisford
- Merlin Bobb
- Freddy Sanon
- Larry Levan
- Louie Vega
- Tony Humphries
- DJ Clark Kent
- 718 Sessions
- Tee Scott
- David Morales
- Frankie Knuckles
- Tony Touch
- Moby
- Dmitry (Deee-Lite)
- Keoki (Disco 2000)
- Michele Sainte
- Scotto (Scott Osman)
- Jason Jinx
- On-E
- DB (originally from London)
- Guy DMC
- Jacyln Christie
- Dante
- Soul Slinger
- Timmy Regisford
- Mr. Kleen
- Orbital

== See also ==
- The Limelight
- Webster Hall
- Twilo (formerly The Sound Factory; closed in 2001)
- Roxy NYC
- Paradise Garage
