= Trilogy (group) =

American freestyle and hip hop group

- Also known as: TRL
- Origin: New York City, US
- Genres: freestyle; hip hop; Latin pop
- Years active: 1985–1995; 2007; 2017–present
- Labels: Atco; Prism
- Members: Duran Ramos; J.R. Mansanet; Angel DeLeon; Joey Kid
- Past members: Carlos "CNR" Rivera; Kenny Diaz; Darrin Henson

Trilogy is an American freestyle and hip hop group from the Bronx, New York City, founded in 1984 by Carlos "CNR" Rivera and included the original members Duran Ramos and J.R. Mansanet. The group pioneered freestyle music and scored several hit songs including "Latin Love", "Red Hot", "Love Me Forever or Love Me Not", "Good Time", and "Do You Wanna Get Funky".

== History ==
In 1984, while living in the Bronx, NY, Brooklyn raised Carlos “Ceanar” Rivera was an inspiring singer/songwriter who worked as a doorman in Manhattan. He recruited J.R. Mansanet (Hector Mansanet) who introduced Ceanar to Duran Ramos (born Randy Duran Ramos) in Mosholu Parkway area in the Bronx. A year later, these three members founded the freestyle group called Trilogy. In the summer of 1986, they signed with Jackie Jack Records where they released their debut single "Red Hot,” later that year. The single played in underground clubs in NYC, and became a freestyle radio hit. In 1987, Trilogy released another freestyle single titled "Latin Love" which garnered them even more notoriety in the club and radio waves. In 1988, they released another single "Gotta Be Free". Shortly thereafter, because of personal challenges, “Ceanar” was released from Trilogy. By the end of that year, Rivera was replaced by Angel DeLeon. In 1989, due to differences within the group, Mansanet was replaced by Kenny Diaz who introduced the group to Robert Clivillés and David Cole. Diaz departed from the group after disagreeing with the production contract and was replaced by Darrin Henson. During that time, Clivillés offered the group a chance to record the future greatly successful song "Gonna Make You Sweat (Everybody Dance Now)", but they declined. Despite declining to record the song, Ramos contributed background vocals on the C+C Music Factory's album Gonna Make You Sweat. In 1991, Trilogy released a single "Love Me Forever Or Love Me Not", produced by Clivillés and Cole. The single peaked at number 82 on the Billboard's Hot 100,

In late 1992, Trilogy (Ramos, DeLeon, and Henson) released a single called "Good Time". In 1994, Henson departed from the group and was replaced with singer Joey Kid. In the same year, the new lineup of Trilogy debuted as the main male vocalists on the C+C Music Factory album Anything Goes!. The group were featured on the successful singles "Do You Wanna Get Funky" and "Take a Toke". Following the release of the album, Trilogy toured with C+C Music Factory in 1995.

After the C+C Music Factory tour, Trilogy disbanded in June 1995. Ramos continued to work and produce music with Clivillés and Cole as well as produce music for other singers including Busta Rhymes, Lisa Lisa & Cult Jam, and New Kids on the Block. Rivera pursued a solo career and often performed under the stage name CNR of Trilogy. Mansanet left the music industry and pursued a career as a video engineer for several major telecommunication companies in New York and South Florida. Joey Kid continued on as a solo artist. Angel DeLeon pursued a career as a tv host starting in 1998. In 1999, Angel DeLeon became one of the hosts for the Montreux Jazz Festival.

In 2007, the original members (Ramos, Rivera, and Mansanet) reunited for the first time in 15 years for a one-time performance at Mohegan Sun Arena in Uncasville, Connecticut. On November 8, 2014, Ramos and Rivera received an honorary award on behalf of Trilogy at the Freestyle Honor Awards in Kissimmee, Florida, for their musical contributions to freestyle music. They also performed their song "Latin Love". In the same year, Rivera began performing under the "Trilogy" name with two additional vocalists. In March 2017, Ramos and DeLeon reunited as Trilogy and began performing at different venues. In 2018, DeLeon launched an online talk show series called "Angel In The City". In 2019, Rivera (under the "Trilogy" name; with two other vocalists) toured with other freestyle music artists on the "I Love Freestyle Music Tour". The tour also included Kid, who performed separate from Trilogy.

In 2021, Rivera announced that Trilogy had reunited. Trilogy (Rivera, Ramos, Mansanet, and DeLeon) released a single "Sound of Thunder" on Diaz's Londinium The Label. In 2022, all seven members of Trilogy were interviewed by director Maria Soccor for the upcoming documentary Freestyle Music: The Legacy, which is currently still in production.

On July 28, 2022, Carlos "CNR" Rivera died. Many members of Trilogy posted tributes to him on social media, and on August 5 the documentary's social media accounts shared unreleased pictures of Rivera from the set of the upcoming film Freestyle Music: The Legacy.

== Band members ==
Current

- Duran Ramos (1985–1995), (2007), (2014), (2017), (2021–present)
- J.R. Mansanet (1985–1989), (2007), (2021–present)
- Angel DeLeon (1988–1995), (2017), (2021–present)
- Joey Kid (1994–1995), (2021–present)

Past

- Carlos "CNR" Rivera (deceased) (1985–1988), (2007), (2014), (2019), (2021)
- Kenny Diaz (1989–1990)
- Darrin Henson (1990–1994)

== Discography ==
=== Singles ===
Single	Year	Peak chart positions								Album
Single	Year	US	US Dance	AUS	GER	NED	NZ	SWE	UK	Album
"Red Hot"	1986	—	—	—	—	—	—	—	—	Non-album single
"Latin Love"	1987	—	—	—	—	—	—	—	—	Non-album single
"Gotta Be Free"	1987	—	—	—	—	—	—	—	—	Non-album single
"Love Me Forever Or Love Me Not"	1991	82	2	—	—	—	—	—	—	Non-album single
"Good Time"	1992	118	32	—	—	—	—	—	—	Non-album single
"Do You Wanna Get Funky" (C+C Music Factory featuring Martha Wash, Zelma Davis, and Trilogy)	1994	40	1	11	41	18	2	37	27	Anything Goes!
"Take a Toke" (C+C Music Factory featuring Trilogy)	1994	—	23	—	88	—	—	—	26	Anything Goes!
"Sound of Thunder"	2021	—	—	—	—	—	—	—	—	Non-album single
"—" denotes releases that did not chart
