= You're the One (Sandeé song) =

Single by Sandeé
- Released: 1987
- Genre: Dance-pop, Freestyle
- Label: Atlantic
- Songwriter(s): Avy Gonzalez
- Producer(s): Avy Gonzalez; Teneen Ali

Sandeé singles chronology
"Always Beside Me" (1987)	"You're the One" (1987)	"Notice Me" (1988)

"You're the One" is a single from freestyle singer Sandeé.

== Track listing ==
U.S. 12-inch Single

No.	Title	Length
1.	"You're the One" (Miami Mix)	5:42
2.	"You're the One" (Original Mix)	5:24
3.	"You're the One" (New York Mix)	6:50
4.	"You're the One" (Dub)	6:52

== Charts ==
Chart (1987)	Peak Position
U.S. Billboard Hot Dance Music/Club Play	17
