= Love Desire =

Single by Sandeé

from the album Only Time Will Tell
- Released: May 16, 1991
- Genre: Dance-pop, Freestyle
- Length: 5:32 (album version)
- Label: RAL/Fever
- Songwriter(s): Elis Pacheco

Sandeé singles chronology
"Notice Me" (1988)	"Love Desire" (1991)

"Love Desire" is the second single from freestyle singer Sandeé's debut album Only Time Will Tell.

== Track listing ==
US 12" single

No.	Title	Length
1.	"Love Desire" (Inquisition Mix)	5:44
2.	"Love Desire" (Revelation Mix)	5:54
3.	"Love Desire" (Revelation Dub)	8:15
4.	"Love Desire" (Eclipse Mix)	4:50
5.	"Love Desire" (House of Def Mix)	7:21
6.	"Love Desire" (Red Zone Mix)	6:07

== Charts ==
Chart (1991)	Peak Position
U.S. Billboard Hot 100	49
U.S. Billboard Hot Dance Music/Club Play	21
U.S. Billboard Hot Dance Music/Maxi-Singles Sales	5
U.S. Billboard Hot R&B/Hip-Hop Singles & Tracks	83
