= Buffy the Vampire Slayer (film) =

1992 film by Fran Rubel Kuzui

- Theatrical release poster
- Directed by: Fran Rubel Kuzui
- Written by: Joss Whedon
- Produced by: Kaz Kuzui; Howard Rosenman
- Starring: Kristy Swanson; Donald Sutherland; Paul Reubens; Rutger Hauer; Luke Perry
- Cinematography: James Hayman
- Edited by: Camilla Toniolo; Jill Savitt
- Music by: Carter Burwell
- Production companies: Sandollar Productions; Kuzui Enterprises
- Distributed by: 20th Century Fox
- Release date: July 31, 1992
- Running time: 86 minutes
- Country: United States
- Language: English
- Budget: $7 million
- Box office: $16.6 million

Buffy the Vampire Slayer is a 1992 American comedy horror vampire film directed by Fran Rubel Kuzui and written by Joss Whedon. It stars Kristy Swanson as the eponymous Buffy Summers, a Valley Girl cheerleader who learns it is her fate to hunt vampires. Donald Sutherland, Paul Reubens, Rutger Hauer, and Luke Perry appear in supporting roles; the film also features Hilary Swank in her debut role as one of Buffy's friends.

Buffy the Vampire Slayer was released by 20th Century Fox on July 31, 1992. The film received mixed reviews from critics and grossed $16.6 million on a $7 million budget. It also took a different direction from what Whedon intended, leading him to create a television series of the same name with his original plan to critical acclaim.

== Plot ==
Buffy Summers is a cheerleader at Hemery High School in Los Angeles. Her main concerns are shopping and spending time with her rich, snooty friends and her jock boyfriend, Jeffrey. While at the mall one day, she is approached by a man who calls himself Merrick. He informs her that she is the Slayer, or "Chosen One", destined to kill vampires and his duty as her "Watcher" is to guide and train her. Buffy, thinking he is a crazy homeless man, rebuffs him.

Merrick later convinces Buffy of her birth-right by vividly describing a recurring dream of hers and taking her to stake two new vampires in a graveyard. She realizes that her natural agility, flexibility, strength, and heightened senses are in fact signs that she possesses the abilities of a Slayer. While he stands by his duty as "Watcher", Buffy repeatedly tries Merrick's patience with her indifference to slaying and sharp-tongued remarks. Merrick informs Buffy that her duty is to slay the elder vampire Lothos, who is plotting to rebuild his former brood with the aid of his loyal acolyte, Amilyn.

Meanwhile, struggling mechanic Pike and his friend Benny are out drinking when they are attacked by Amilyn. Benny is turned, but Pike is saved by Merrick. After a run-in with the now vampiric Benny, Pike decides to leave town. He runs into Amilyn and his gang of vampires, and Buffy and Merrick rescue him from being turned. After this encounter, Pike insists on helping Buffy and they become friends despite a previous dislike of each other.

Buffy discovers during a basketball game that one of Jeffrey's teammates, Grueller, is a vampire. Pike helps her stake him, but Lothos discovers Buffy's true nature. He arrives with Amilyn and places her in a hypnotic trance. Merrick, despite having vowed not to intervene in Buffy's work, attacks Lothos only to be fatally wounded; in a sign of respect, the vampire departs immediately. As Merrick dies in Buffy's arms, he tells her to wait for "the silence".

At school, Buffy attempts to explain things to her friends, but they refuse to listen, being more concerned with an upcoming school dance. Buffy tries to reason with them but realizes they are too immature and selfish to understand the consequences of a vampire infestation. Blaming herself for Merrick's death, Buffy falls into despair and goes dress shopping, before angrily telling Pike that she is in over her head trying to be the Slayer. A frustrated Pike goes home and starts carving stakes.

At the senior dance, Buffy is dismayed to find Jeffrey has dumped her (via a message on her answering machine) and is instead at the dance with her friend Jenny. While she grieves, Pike arrives and asks Buffy to dance, and they enjoy a romantic moment. Lothos, having traced Buffy with Benny's help, commands his brood to attack. Pike organizes the students to fight back, resulting in all of the vampires being slain; when Benny confronts him, Pike scars him with a flask filled with holy water before electrocuting him to death.

Buffy confronts Amilyn and Lothos in the school's basement. Lothos refuses to help Amilyn, who is easily overpowered and staked, but then puts Buffy back into a trance before preparing to turn her. Remembering Merrick's final words, Buffy snaps out of the trance and tricks Lothos into touching a cross; when it catches fire, she uses her hairspray to set him aflame. Lothos brushes off the flames and pursues her back to the gym; following a brief duel, Buffy stakes him with a broken chair leg then finds her friend Pike. As Buffy and Pike drive off on his motorbike, a news crew interviews the survivors of the attack.

== Cast ==
- Kristy Swanson as Buffy Summers
- Donald Sutherland as Merrick Jamison-Smythe
- Paul Reubens as Amilyn
- Rutger Hauer as Lothos
- Luke Perry as Oliver Pike
- Michele Abrams as Jennifer
- Hilary Swank as Kimberly Hannah
- Paris Vaughan as Nicki
- David Arquette as Benny Jacks
- Randall Batinkoff as Jeffrey Kramer
- Andrew Lowery as Andy
- Sasha Jenson as Grueller
- Stephen Root as Principal Gary Murray
- Natasha Gregson Wagner as Cassandra
- Candy Clark as Buffy's mom
- Thomas Jane (credited as Tom Janes) as Zeph
- James Paradise as Buffy's dad

Appearing in uncredited roles are Ben Affleck as a basketball player, Ricki Lake as Charlotte, Seth Green as a vampire, and Alexis Arquette as the vampire DJ.

== Production ==
Joss Whedon sold the film to singer Dolly Parton's production company, Sandollar, in the fall of 1991. Filming was completed in just five weeks to accommodate Luke Perry's Beverly Hills, 90210 filming schedule. Whedon cited the film Night of the Comet as the primary inspiration for the film's story.

Whedon was involved in an advisory role early in the production but departed after becoming dissatisfied with the direction the film was taking. Executives at 20th Century Fox removed many of Whedon's jokes, believing the humor to be too abstract for audiences. They also saw the film as a light-hearted B movie comedy as opposed to the darker tone Whedon had envisioned in his draft, and this resulted in several major plot changes; Merrick was killed protecting Buffy instead of committing suicide after being bitten by Lothos, and the original ending, in which Buffy was forced to burn down her school gym to destroy the vampires, was cut.

All this led Whedon to finally abandon the production. He has been highly critical of actor Donald Sutherland's behavior on set, describing him as entitled and difficult to work with. Sutherland had a penchant for improvising or altering his lines in the script, which director Rubel Kuzui allowed him to do freely because he was the film's most high-profile star. Whedon, by contrast, felt that this made Merrick's dialogue in the film disjointed and unintelligible.

Filming in Los Angeles included the ballroom of the Park Plaza Hotel, where Merrick lives and trains Buffy, John Marshall High School in Los Feliz, and the gymnasium of University High School in West Los Angeles, where the high school dance and vampire attack was filmed.

== Reception ==
=== Box office ===
The film debuted at #5 at the North American box office and eventually grossed $16,624,456 against a $7 million production budget.

=== Critical reception ===
On review aggregator website Rotten Tomatoes, the film has an approval rating of 36%, based on 56 reviews, with an average rating of 4.4/10. The consensus reads, "Buffy the Vampire Slayer's supernatural coming of age tale is let down by poor directing and even poorer plotting—though Kristy Swanson's and Paul Reubens' game performances still manage to slay." On Metacritic, the film has a weighted average score of 48 out of 100, based on 17 critics, indicating "mixed or average" reviews. Audiences polled by CinemaScore gave the film an average grade of "B+" on an A+ to F scale.

== Home media ==
The film was released on VHS and LaserDisc in the United States in November 1992 and in the United Kingdom in April 1993 by Fox Video and re-released in 1995 under the 20th Century Fox Selections banner. It was released on DVD in the United States in 2001 and on Blu-ray in 2011.

== Television ==
Annoyed by his loss of creative control over the movie, Whedon wrote and produced a television series of the same name five years later on The WB network. In keeping with Whedon's original concept for Buffy Summers, the series changed a number of key details concerning her personal history. For example, the movie portrays Buffy as a senior in high school when she becomes the Slayer, but this is retconned in the show so that she instead takes on the role as a sophomore. In the film, Buffy is an only child and has wealthy but negligent parents who spoil her; in the show, Buffy has a caring, newly divorced mother named Joyce and later a younger sister, Dawn.

The supernatural abilities of both vampires and the Slayer are depicted differently. The vampires in the film die like humans; in the television series, they turn to dust. Unlike the television series, their faces remain human albeit pale, fanged, and with notched ears, whereas in the television series, they take on a demonic aspect, especially when newly raised. The television series suggests that new vampires must consciously learn to maintain a human appearance. In the film, Merrick has been reincarnated many times, to train many Slayers; in the television series, Watchers are mortal and specially trained for their role and mission. Merrick's British accent and the manner of his death are different when he appears in flashbacks in the television series.

Joss Whedon has expressed his dissatisfaction with the film's interpretation of the script, stating, "I finally sat down and had written it and somebody had made it into a movie, and I felt like—well, that's not quite her. It's a start, but it's not quite the girl."

According to the Official Buffy Watcher's Guide, Whedon wrote the pilot to the television series as a sequel to his original script, which is why the television series makes references to events that did not occur in the film. In 1999, Dark Horse Comics released a graphic novel adaptation of Whedon's original script under the title The Origin. Whedon stated: "The Origin comic, though I have issues with it, CAN pretty much be accepted as canonical. They did a cool job of combining the movie script with the series, that was nice, and using the series Merrick and not a certain OTHER thespian who shall remain hated."

== Soundtrack ==
Buffy the Vampire Slayer (Original Motion Picture Soundtrack)

Soundtrack album by Various
- Released: July 28, 1992
- Recorded: December 1991 – April 1992
- Length: 41:57
- Label: Columbia

Buffy the Vampire Slayer (Original Motion Picture Soundtrack)
No.	Title	Original artist(s)	Length
1.	"Keep It Comin' (Dance Till You Can't Dance No More)"	C+C Music Factory featuring Deborah Cooper and Q-Unique	3:58
2.	"Man Smart, Woman Smarter"	Dream Warriors	4:31
3.	"Silent City"	Matthew Sweet	2:51
4.	"We Close Our Eyes" (originally by Oingo Boingo)	Susanna Hoffs	3:54
5.	"Little Heaven"	Toad the Wet Sprocket	4:27
6.	"I Ain't Gonna Eat Out My Heart Anymore"	Divinyls	4:32
7.	"Party with the Animals"	Ozzy Osbourne	4:18
8.	"Zap City"	The Cult	5:14
9.	"I Fought the Law" (originally by The Crickets)	Mary's Danish	3:19
10.	"Light Comes Out of Black"	Pantera and Rob Halford	4:59

Other songs featured in the film but not the soundtrack album include: "Everybody Hurts" by R.E.M., "In the Wind" by War Babies, and "Inner Mind" by Eon.

== Possible remake ==
On May 25, 2009, The Hollywood Reporter reported that Roy Lee and Doug Davison of Vertigo Entertainment were working with Fran Rubel Kuzui and Kaz Kuzui on a re-envisioning or relaunch of the Buffy film for the big screen. The film would not be a sequel nor prequel to the existing film or television franchise, and Joss Whedon would have no involvement in the project. None of the characters, cast, or crew from the television series would be featured. Television series executive producer Marti Noxon later reflected that this story might have been produced by the studio in order to frighten Whedon into taking the reins of the project. On November 22, 2010, The Hollywood Reporter confirmed that Warner Bros. had picked up the movie rights to the remake. The film was set for release sometime in 2012. 20th Century Fox, which usually holds the rights to both the Buffy and Angel television series, would retain merchandising and some distribution rights.

The idea of the remake caused wrath among fans of the TV series, since Whedon was not involved. The project did not have any connection with the show and would not conform to the continuity maintained with the Buffy the Vampire Slayer Season Eight and Season Nine comic book titles. Proposed shooting locations included Black Wood and other areas in rural England, due to budgetary constraints and the potential setting being outside of the city, an unusual change for the franchise.

In December 2011, more than a year after the official reboot announcement, the Los Angeles Times site reported that Whit Anderson, the writer picked for the new Buffy movie, had her script rejected by the producers behind the project, and that a new writer was being sought. Sources also stated that "If you're going to bring it back, you have to do it right. [Anderson] came in with some great ideas and she had reinvented some of the lore and it was pretty cool but in the end there just wasn't enough on the page."

As of July 2018, Joss Whedon announced at San Diego Comic-Con that he was working on a sequel of the TV series and that it might feature a Slayer of color.

== See also ==
- The Origin, a comic book reinterpretation of the film script
- Vampire film
