= List of Cash Box Top 100 number-one singles of 1993 =

These are the singles that reached number one on the Top 100 Singles chart in 1993 as published by Cash Box magazine.

Key
†	Indicates best-performing single of 1993

Issue date	Song	Artist
January 2	"I Will Always Love You"	Whitney Houston
January 9	"I Will Always Love You"	Whitney Houston
January 16	"I Will Always Love You"	Whitney Houston
January 23	"I Will Always Love You"	Whitney Houston
January 30	"I Will Always Love You"	Whitney Houston
February 6	"I Will Always Love You"	Whitney Houston
February 13	"I Will Always Love You"	Whitney Houston
February 20	"I Will Always Love You"	Whitney Houston
February 27	"I Will Always Love You"	Whitney Houston
March 6	"I Will Always Love You"	Whitney Houston
March 13	"Ordinary World"	Duran Duran
March 20	"I'm Every Woman"	Whitney Houston
March 27	"Informer"	Snow
April 3	"Informer"	Snow
April 10	"I Have Nothing"	Whitney Houston
April 17	"I Have Nothing"	Whitney Houston
April 24	"I Have Nothing"	Whitney Houston
May 1	"Looking Through Patient Eyes"	PM Dawn
May 8	"Looking Through Patient Eyes"	PM Dawn
May 15	"Looking Through Patient Eyes"	PM Dawn
May 22	"That's The Way Love Goes"	Janet Jackson
May 29	"That's The Way Love Goes"	Janet Jackson
June 5	"That's The Way Love Goes"	Janet Jackson
June 12	"That's The Way Love Goes"	Janet Jackson
June 19	"That's The Way Love Goes"	Janet Jackson
June 26	"That's The Way Love Goes"	Janet Jackson
July 3	"That's The Way Love Goes"	Janet Jackson
July 10	"That's The Way Love Goes"	Janet Jackson
July 17	"Weak"	SWV
July 24	"Weak"	SWV
July 31	"Can't Help Falling In Love" †	UB40
August 7	"Can't Help Falling In Love" †	UB40
August 14	"Can't Help Falling In Love" †	UB40
August 21	"Can't Help Falling In Love" †	UB40
August 28	"Can't Help Falling In Love" †	UB40
September 4	"Can't Help Falling In Love" †	UB40
September 11	"Can't Help Falling In Love" †	UB40
September 18	"Can't Help Falling In Love" †	UB40
September 25	"Dreamlover"	Mariah Carey
October 2	"Dreamlover"	Mariah Carey
October 9	"Dreamlover"	Mariah Carey
October 16	"Dreamlover"	Mariah Carey
October 23	"The River of Dreams"	Billy Joel
October 30	"Just Kickin' It"	Xscape
November 6	"I'd Do Anything for Love (But I Won't Do That)"	Meat Loaf
November 13	"I'd Do Anything for Love (But I Won't Do That)"	Meat Loaf
November 20	"I'd Do Anything for Love (But I Won't Do That)"	Meat Loaf
November 27	"I'd Do Anything for Love (But I Won't Do That)"	Meat Loaf
December 4	"I'd Do Anything for Love (But I Won't Do That)"	Meat Loaf
December 11	"I'd Do Anything for Love (But I Won't Do That)"	Meat Loaf
December 18	"Again"	Janet Jackson
December 25	"Again"	Janet Jackson
December 31	"Again"	Janet Jackson

== See also ==
- 1993 in music
- List of Hot 100 number-one singles of 1993 (U.S.)
