= Boyd Jarvis =

American record producer, remixer and musician

Boyd H. Jarvis
- Also known as: Boyd Jarvis
- Born: Boyd Henry Jarvis; October 26, 1958; New York City
- Died: February 17, 2018 (aged 59) East Orange, New Jersey
- Genres: Post-disco, garage house, dub, deep house, urban
- Occupations: Musician producer Remixer
- Instruments: Vocals, synthesizer, keyboards
- Years active: 1981–2017
- Labels: Prelude, Wave Music, 4th & B'way Records
- Formerly of: Timmy Regisford, Visual, Billie
- Website: Twitter page Last.fmpage

Boyd H. Jarvis (October 26, 1958 – February 17, 2018) was an American record producer, remixer and musician, best known for his song, co-written with Jason Smith, "The Music Got Me"; released in 1983 by Prelude Records. He has collaborated with artists such as Herbie Hancock, La Toya Jackson and Johnny Kemp.

== Career ==
Boyd Jarvis started his career as an intern for renowned professor of Anthropology Pearl Primus, training under Sandra Ross in theater lighting and set design. He went on to design lighting for shows in Lincoln center, Perry Street theater, and Riverside church theater.

In 1981, Jervis started out playing music with his first synthesizer the Yamaha CS-15. He asked some local DJ's if he could take the synth to their club and jam over their music. They allowed him to do that and they loved it. One day DJ Timmy Regisford heard him, and asked to join him at some live DJ session to overdub and after that they started making music together at Regisford's house, with use of drum machines and reel to reel, which led to some remix jobs. Couple of his early instrumental tracks were called "One Love" and "Stomp" which ended up getting him a record deal for $5000.

His first official track, "Music Got Me" was released in 1983.

He also hosted a radio show, Saturday Night Dance Party, on New York's WBLS with Regisford. Together they also produced and remixed records for many well known artists of the time such as Madonna, Sade and Chaka Khan, among others.

Jarvis worked as a session musician for John "Jellybean" Benitez, Wally Jump, Jr. & the Criminal Element, Colonel Abrams, Herbie Hancock, and dance-pop acts like Club Nouveau and Pretty Poison. and as a producer and remixer he collaborated with Little Louie Vega and François Kevorkian.

Jarvis has a label called CFX Records.

== Personal life ==
Jarvis was diagnosed with cancer in 2016. Prior to his passing on February 17, 2018, he resided in New Jersey with his wife.

== Jarvis v. A & M Records lawsuit ==
In 1993, Jarvis sued Robert Clivillés and David Cole of C+C Music Factory for copyright infringement over their song "Get Dumb", which illegally (by sampling a sound recording without authorization) incorporates parts of "The Music Got Me". Jarvis v. A & M Records was one of the first cases involving digital sampling.

"It is hard to believe that [a re-release of "The Music Got Me"] would be successful"

— Robert Clivillés after being told that he and David Cole injured Jarvis' career by releasing "Get Dumb (Free Your Body)",

"Get Dumb! (Free Your Body)" was recorded and released under names The Crew (featuring Freedom Williams) and Seduction. Multiple versions were released by Vendetta Records (a sub-label of A&M Records).

"Get Dumb", written by Cole and Clivilles, incorporated elements of "The Music Got Me", most noticeably a distinctive keyboard riff and the bridge section composed of free your body sounds. Jarvis claimed that he was damaged for US$15 million. However, he failed to demonstrate the amount of actual damages, which are measured by "[the] extent to which the market value of the copyrighted work at the time of infringement has been injured or destroyed by such infringement." Total damage was estimated at $95,872, using the data from "Get Dumb" profits.

== Discography ==
=== Productions ===
Year	Single	Label	Recorded by	Notes
1983	"The Music Got Me"	Prelude Records	Visual	
1983	"Somehow, Someway"	Prelude Records	Visual	
1984	"Release The Tension"	4th & B'way Records	Circuit	
1984	" A Little Help (From My Friends)"	4th & B'way Records		
1985	" Battles of the Beats"	Next Plateau Records Inc.	Boyd Jarvis	co-produced by Timmy Regisford
1985	"One Love"	Supertronics	Janice Christie	co-produced by Timmy Regisford
1986	"Central Line"	Fleetwood Records	Level 3	Reissued and remixed in 2001 as Boyd Jarvis feat. Level 3
1986	"Hey Boy"	Supertronics	Tammy Lucas	Co-writer with Tammy Lucas. Co-produced with Timmy Regisford.
1986	"Nobody's Business"	Fleetwood Records	Billie	Co-produced with Timmy Regisford.
1987	"Love Reaction"	Minimal Records	React	Co-produced with Timmy Regisford.
1987	"I've Got the Music"	Movin' Records		
1991	"Blink Blink"	Movin' Records	Boyd Jarvis At Last	
1997	"Stomp"	Novus/Cisco		Instrumental version of Visual's The Musics Got Me
1997	"Tribal Juice"	Jazz Club Records	Nyles-Jarvis Project	
1997	"We Can work It Out"	Jazz Club Records	Nyles-Jarvis Project	
1997	"Love and Respect"	Maxi Records	Carlos Sanchez Movement	
1997	"2000 Miles - A Tribute to Miles Davis"	Jazz Club Records	Jazz Explosion	
1998	"It's You"	Lifeline Records	Level 3	
1999	"Alibokolijah"	Shelter	Boyd Jarvis	
1999	"Dis Poem"	Guidance Recordings	Mutabaruka	Co-produced with Joe Claussell.
1999	"Right Size"	U.N.I.T.Y Records	Boyd Jarvis	
2000	"Elements" (EP)	Dance Tracks	Boyd Jarvis	
2000	"Atmos-Fear"	Wave Music	Boyd Jarvis	
2000	"Jazz Funeral"	Guidance Recordings	Joe Claussell & Chuck Perkins	
2001	"Sunny Days"	Wave Music	Boyd Jarvis	
2002	"Don't Deny Love"	King Street Sounds	Boyd Jarvis	
2004	"Keep It Moving"	Trax Records	Boyd Jarvis	

=== Other selected credits ===
Year	Single	Label	Recorded by	Notes
1983	"I Got a Song For You"	Half Moon Records	Free Russell	Mixed by Boyd Jarvis and Timmy Regisford
1984	"Sidewalk Talk"	EMI America	Jellybean	Synthesizer
1984	"On the Floor"	Half Moon Records	Tony Cook & The Party People	Remix
1985	"Can't Wait Until Tomorrow"	Cotillion/Atlantic	Johnny Gill	Remix
1988	"A.C."	MCA Records	The Crusaders	
1988	"Don't Be Cruel"		Bobby Brown	
1988	"You Laid Your Love on Me"	Motown	Gerald Alston	Additional overdubs
1988	"Secret Rendezvous"	Warner Bros. Records	Karyn White	Programming
1988	"Lovin' on Next to Nothin'	MCA Records	Gladys Knight & The Pips	
1988	"Beat Wise"	Columbia	Herbie Hancock	Keyboards
1988	"Wonderful'	Reprise Records	Rick James	Keyboard Programming
1988	"Stop It" (LP)	EMI-Manhattan	Evelyn King	Bass
1988	"Watching You"	Virgin Records	Loose Ends	Keyboards
1988	"Dancin' with Myself"	Columbia Records	Johnny Kemp	Additional production
1988	"Addicted to You"	ATCO Records	LeVert	Co-producer (overdubs)
1989	"That's the Way Love Is"	Atlantic	Ten City	Mixed by
1989	"Life Is a Dance: The Remix Project" (LP)	Virgin Records	Chaka Khan	Keyboard Programming
1994	"I Get Lifted"	Strictly Rhythm	Barabara Tucker	Keyboards
1997	"Lost and Found"	Columbia	D*Note	Programming, arranging
1998	"Innerside"	Columbia	Shazz	Remix
2001	"Speak To Me Lord"	Estereo	Roland Clark	Remix
2001	"London Lowdown"	Spiritual Life Music	Ronny Jordan	Keyboards
2001	"Dan Gna"		Les Go	Keyboards
2001	"Touch"	Wave Records	Milk & Honey	Engineer & Remix
