= Yamaha CS30/CS30L synthesizer =

Analogue keyboard synthesizer

Yamaha CS-30
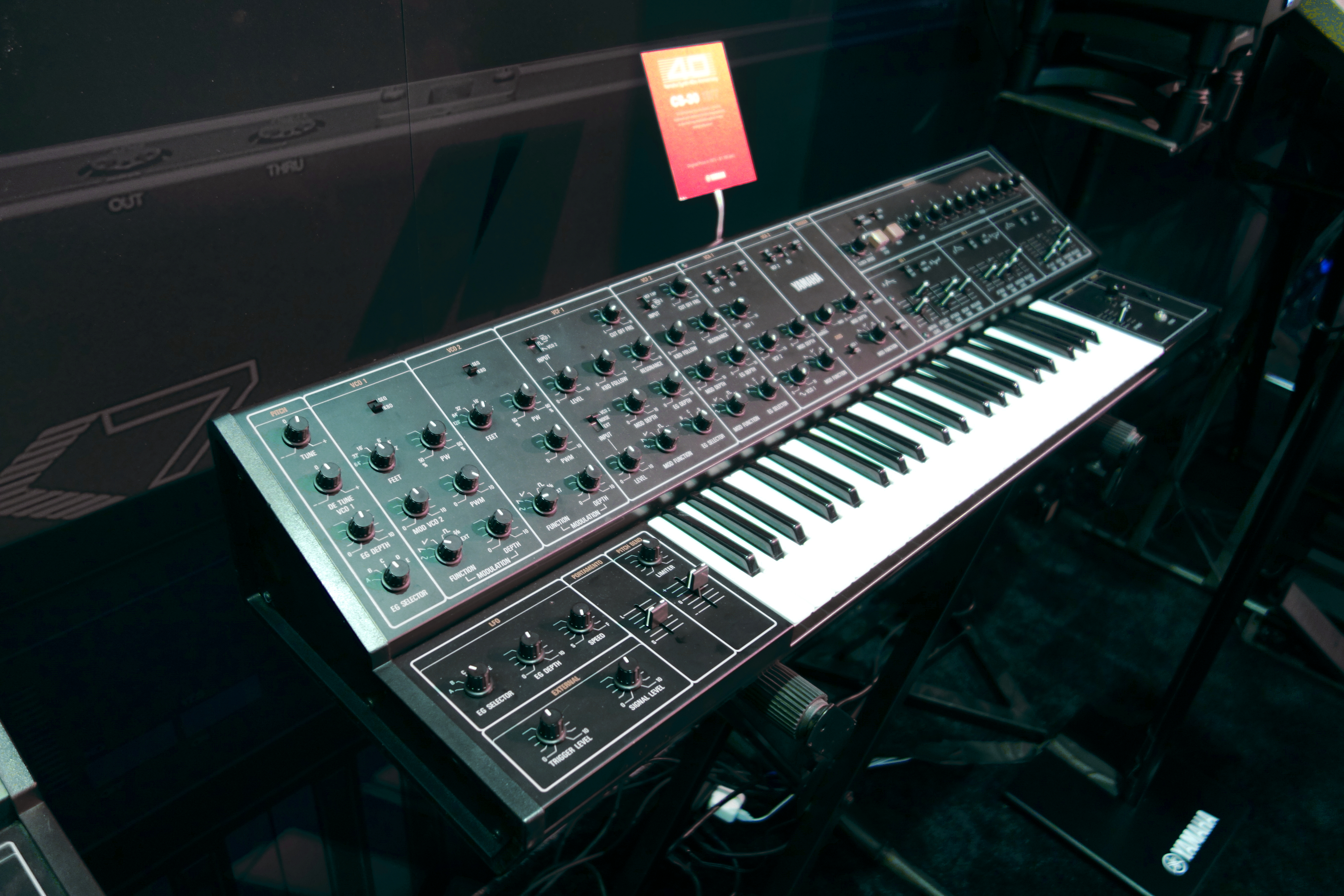
- Yamaha CS-30
- Manufacturer: Yamaha
- Dates: 1977
- Price: MSRP: Y194,250

Technical specifications
- Polyphony: Monophonic
- Timbrality: 1 part
- Oscillator: 2
- LFO: 1 LFO saw, square, sine, sample and hold
- Synthesis type: Analog Subtractive
- Filter: 2 Filters, low-pass, high-pass, band pass, resonant, 2 Pole
- Attenuator: ADSR
- Velocity expression: No
- Storage memory: 2
- Effects: No

Input/output

The Yamaha CS30/CS30L is an analog keyboard synthesizer that was released in 1977. It is the top of the range in Yamaha's original line-up of monophonic synthesizers, others in the range being the CS5, CS10 and CS15. It features two voltage controlled oscillators (VCOs), two voltage controlled filters (VCFs - both featuring low-pass, band-pass and high-pass options), two voltage controlled amplifiers (VCAs) and three envelope generators. It also sports a ring modulator and a voltage controlled low-frequency oscillator (LFO).

It is fairly unusual for a hard-wired synthesizer in that it features a variety of switches which allow the user to re-route the signal flow from the usual VCO-VCF-VCA convention. For example, VCO 1 can output a square wave through VCF 1 whilst also outputting a high-pass filtered sawtooth wave through VCO 2. Another example is that the envelope generators can be assigned to any of the VCO, VCF and VCA modules and can also be inverted. Because the LFO is voltage controlled, the oscillating speed can be governed by an envelope generator and different waveforms can be applied to the other modules all at the same time. The CS30/CS30L also features an external signal input for filtering other musical instruments and audio sources, which can also be used as a modulation source.

The major difference between the CS30 and the CS30L is that the former includes an onboard eight-step analogue sequencer. The latter came with chrome legs and was built into a tolex case for easier transportation.

Because of its signal routing flexibility, the CS30/CS30L is generally considered to be an excellent source of bizarre electronic sounds.
