= Anything Goes! (C+C Music Factory album) =

Studio album by C+C Music Factory
- Released: August 9, 1994
- Recorded: 1994
- Genres: House; hip hop
- Length: 77:32
- Label: Columbia
- Producers: David Cole; Robert Clivillés

C+C Music Factory chronology
Gonna Make You Sweat (1990)	Anything Goes! (1994)	C+C Music Factory (1995)

Singles from Anything Goes!
- 1. "Do You Wanna Get Funky" Released: 1994; 2. "Take a Toke" Released: 1994; 3. "I Found Love" Released: 1995

Professional ratings
Review scores
Source	Rating
AllMusic	3/5 stars
Billboard	(favorable)
Cash Box	(favorable)
Los Angeles Times	2/4 stars
Music & Media	(favorable)
People Magazine	(favorable)
Record Mirror	4/5 stars
Spin	(favorable)

Anything Goes! is the second album by the US dance group C+C Music Factory. The album's lead single "Do You Wanna Get Funky"; which featured Martha Wash, Zelma Davis, and Trilogy, reached number 1 on the Dance/Club Play charts, number 40 on the Hot 100, and number 11 on the R&B Singles chart. The follow-up single, "Take a Toke" reached number 23 on the Dance/Club Play and 48 on the R&B Singles chart. "Take a Toke" was included in the soundtrack of Brazilian novela Quatro Por Quatro and was a hit single in the country.

The album's third single, "I Found Love", features a sample of Kool & The Gang's "Ladies' Night". "Just Wanna Chill" samples R. Kelly's "Honey Love" and Tony Toni Tone's- Slow Wine.

== Critical reception ==
Billboard magazine wrote, "Though set isn't as innovative as Sweat, it does overflow with state-of-the-street grooves, wicked hooks, and vigorous vocals. Zelma Davis and Martha Wash are back, swapping gleeful vamps on radio-ready hip-hoppers like 'Bounce to the Beat' and the fast-rising first single, 'Do You Wanna Get Funky'. Freedom Williams' rap bravado is replaced by Trilogy, a male trio that harmonizes admirably and rhymes with hardcore aggression. Prepare for C+C saturation through the end of '94, as future hits like mellow 'Take A Toke', disco-fied 'Takin' Over', and steamy 'All Damn Night' have their turn at bat."

== Track listing ==
No.	Title	Writer(s)	Length
1.	"Let's Get Started (Interlude I)"	Robert Clivillés; David Cole	1:25
2.	"Bounce to the Beat (Can You Dig It?)"	Robert Clivillés; Ricky Crespo; Duran Ramos	5:24
3.	"Do You Wanna Get Funky" (featuring Martha Wash, Zelma Davis, and Trilogy)	Robert Clivillés; David Cole; Duran Ramos	4:05
4.	"I Found Love" (featuring Zelma Davis)	Robert Clivillés; David Cole	6:02
5.	"A Song Is Just a Song (Interlude II)" (featuring Martha Wash)	Robert Clivillés; David Cole	0:51
6.	"Takin' Over"	David Cole	5:37
7.	"Gonna Love U Over"	Robert Clivillés; David Cole	4:24
8.	"The Mood (Interlude III)"	Robert Clivillés; David Cole	1:03
9.	"Take a Toke"	Robert Clivillés; Duran Ramos; Jorge Corante	5:26
10.	"Just Wanna Chill"	Robert Clivillés; David Cole; Duran Ramos; Zelma Davis	4:50
11.	"All Damn Night"	Robert Clivillés; David Cole; Duran Ramos	4:43
12.	"Share That Beat of Love"	Robert Clivillés; David Cole; Duran Ramos; Rod Temperton	4:29
13.	"Hip Hop Express"	Robert Clivillés; David Cole; Ricky Crespo; Duran Ramos; Angel DeLeón	12:30
14.	"Robi-Rob's Boriqua Anthem"	Robert Clivillés; Danny Vargas; Víctor Vargas; Angel DeLeón	8:57
15.	"C+C Has Left the Building (Interlude IV)"	Robert Clivillés; David Cole	0:44
16.	"The West (Interlude V)"	Robert Clivillés; David Cole	1:44
17.	"Good or Bad (Interlude VI)"	Robert Clivillés; David Cole	0:29
18.	"A Moment of Silence for Larry Levan"		0:09
19.	"A Moment of Silence for Chep Nunez"		0:09
20.	"Papermaker" (feat MC Charlie Brown (AKA C Brown from L.O.N.S)	Robert Clivillés; Duran Ramos; Charles Brown	4:31
Total length:			1:17:32

== Personnel ==
- April Allen – background vocals
- Karen Anderson – background vocals
- Rodney Ascue – engineer
- Katreese Barnes – background vocals
- C+C Music Factory – primary artist
- Brian Chin – liner notes
- Clivillés & Cole – primary artist
- Robert Clivillés – arranger, backing vocals, composer, editing, mixing, producer, sequencing, vocals
- David Cole – arranger, backing vocals, composer, mixing, producer, vocals
- Deborah Cooper – vocals, backing vocals
- Jorge Corante – composer
- Ricky Crespo – composer, producer
- Stephen Cullo – producer
- Stephan Danelian – photography
- Zelma Davis – backing vocals, vocals
- Angel DeLeón – composer, vocals
- Craig Derry – backing vocals
- Will Downing – backing vocals
- Funkmaster Flex – producer
- El General – guest artist
- Andrea Hicks – backing vocals
- Kenny Hicks – vocal producer
- Chris Joannou – producer, programming
- Acar S. Key – engineer, mixing, producer
- Hal Belknap – assistant engineer
- Joey Kid – vocals
- Nicky Lindeman – art direction
- Paul Logus, Jr. – engineer
- Danny Madden – backing vocals
- Bruce Miller – engineer
- Cindy Mizelle – backing vocals
- Julian Peploe – design
- Herb Powers – mastering
- Duran Ramos – composer, producer, vocals
- Bob Rosa – engineer, mixing, producer
- John Seymour – assistant engineer
- Rod Temperton – composer
- Tony Terry – backing vocals
- Trilogy – vocals
- Danny Vargas – composer
- Martha Wash – vocals
- Albert Watson – photography
- Audrey Wheeler – vocals, backing vocals
- Larry Yasgar – executive producer

== Charts ==
Chart performance for Anything Goes!
Chart (1994)	Peak position
Australian Albums (ARIA)	36
Dutch Albums (Album Top 100)	63
New Zealand Albums (RMNZ)	25
Swiss Albums (Schweizer Hitparade)	46
US Billboard 200	106
US Top R&B/Hip-Hop Albums (Billboard)	39
