= Timmy Regisford =

Trinidadian-born American DJ and producer

DJ Timmy Regisford
- Also known as: Afrikan Jazz
- Born: Timothy Regisford
- Genres: House; R&B
- Occupations: Producer; DJ
- Website: clubshelter.com

Timmy Regisford is an American DJ and producer. After working at WBLS radio in New York and as an A&R Director at Atlantic Records and MCA Records, he became Vice President of A&R at Motown Records, then Vice President of A&R at DreamWorks Records. He was the founder and resident DJ at the Club Shelter nights in New York City.

== Career ==
Regisford start deejaying in his teen years.

In 1981, he started in music production by collaborating with Boyd Jarvis, who had a Yamaha CS-15 synthesizer. Regisford heard Jarvis play dubs over some local DJs at a club and asked Jarvis to collaborate with him. Soon they were making music at Regisford's place with the addition of a drum machine and a tape recorder. He landed some remix jobs, which led Jarvis to get a record deal.

He hosted a radio show, Saturday Night Dance Party, on WBLS with Jarvis.

In 1991, he founded a residency at The Shelter nightclub in NYC, where he became known for his long and soulful sets that blended Afro-jazz, Latin jazz, house, disco, funk, and R&B.

In 1988, Regisford began working as an A&R executive and producer for record labels such as Atlantic Records and MCA Records. He produced and remixed tracks for artists such as Diana Ross, Stevie Wonder and Bobby Womack, and helped to introduce the world to the sound of house music.

Over the years, Regisford has continued to work as a DJ, producer, and remixer, collaborating with artists such as Sade, Madonna, and Chaka Khan. He released his own albums and mixtapes.

Regisford is widely regarded as a pioneer of the house music genre, and was inducted into the Dance Music Hall of Fame. He continues to tour the world.

== Discography ==
- Battle of the Beats (1985 EP)
- Movement' (2006 Single)
- Africa Calling (2007 Single)
- At Night/Loving Arms (2007 Single)
- Body/Poem (2007 Single)
- Naive Track (2007 Single)
- The Radical Track (2007 Single)
- Hard Drums (2008 Single)
- Ryan's Theme (2008 Single)
- The Bubble Track (2008 Single)
- Track for Downtown 161 (2008 Single)
- Hold (2009 Single)
- Kala Boo/La Vern Abainana (2009 Single)
- Tension (2009)
- Umoya (2013)
- Branded Shelter (2015) Japan
- 7pm (2019)
