= Deborah Cooper =

American musician

- Genres: Dance, House
- Occupation: Singer
- Years active: 1977–present
- Website: MySpace account

Deborah Cooper is an American professional dancer, musician, singer, backup singer, award-winning composer and entertainer, with several number one and top charting dance music and house music hits.

== Biography ==
=== Early career ===
Cooper started as a female vocalist for the Fatback Band. Her first song with them was Double Dutch and the last one was Wild Sugar, After she left she was replaced by Linda Blakely. Cooper then became a member of the disco/R&B band Change (1981–1985) with whom she had several hits with. In 1991 Cooper featured as guest vocalist on Clivillés and Cole's hit single "A Deeper Love".

Subsequently, in the 1990s, she was part of the C+C Music Factory as both a lead and back up vocalist resulting in several # 1 hits, including "Deeper Love", "Pride" and "Keep It Comin" (Dance Till You Can't Dance) both rap and No. 1 charting dance versions of the theme from the cult film Buffy the Vampire Slayer. The film featured a version of "Keep It Comin" with Rapper Q-Unique, while the Dance club version was solely Deborah Cooper vocals. The music video had clips and actors from the film. Cooper continues to lend her vocals to house music tracks by a number of record producers, while she has also continued to release her own solo tracks.

=== TV appearances ===
While appearing on TV's Saturday Night Live with C+C Music Factory, which was hosted by Susan Dey on February 8, 1992, Deborah Cooper was featured in a solo performance, singing "Deeper Love", known as "Pride" from the repeated lyric tag. This appearance boosted sales of the song. "Deeper love" was actually the "B" side, while the "A" side was a house version of U2's "Pride", known by the tag " In the Name of Love", which was another club hit for Cooper.

==== Backup, session, commercial work ====
As a backup and session singer she has worked with Jessica Simpson, Lisa Lisa (which was during her C&C Music Factory days), and Natalie Cole. She vocalized Budget Gourmet's "Things That Make You Go MMMM" Campaign, which was a take off of the C + C Music Factory song on which Cooper provided vocals. For several years Deborah was a featured singer for Mariah Carey in both recording sessions, as well as during international live performances. Cooper can also be seen in Mariah Carey's "behind the scene" documentary feature for "Butterfly".

In 2004, a commercial for American Express features comedian Ellen DeGeneres dancing around, while Deborah Cooper belts out the famous C + C Music Factory tag line "Everybody Dance Now" from the track "Gonna Make You Sweat".

In 2008, Cooper started writing a book about her life in the music industry, while she also continued composing new dance music.

=== Writing and composition work ===
In 2003, Deborah collaborated with DJ Producer Tony Moran. She wrote "Real Love", which was released publicly by Emerge Records. In early 2007, Cooper began working on her memoirs, focusing on her history in music as an R & B diva, disco, and dance belter, while including stories about being on the road as a performer. An international tour was being planned for summer 2007 in support of her book.

=== Live performance ===
Cooper appears and performs live at clubs, casinos, circuit parties, as well as corporate and special events. Due to the popularity and longevity of the song "Deeper Love", known as "Pride", she frequently appears at LGBT events, Pride Events, and fundraisers. One of these events was Alegria Pride in NYC.

In the late 1990s, Cooper's Personal Appearance Manager, Scott Sherman of the Atlantic Entertainment Group, specifically developed a new concept for Cooper for non-live music appearances, known as "track" shows, typically utilized in smaller venues and "one night" limited runs.

With a team consisting of her Personal Appearance Manager, choreographer Luis Villabon, Sound engineer Henry "Butch" Jackson, and AMS Services for lighting and effects, the track show evolved into a portable production show, fitting both smaller and larger venues. Her costumes included those from designer Gianni Versace and Marc Baur.

In collaboration with dancer and choreographer, Luis Villabon, Cooper and manager Scott Sherman, a retired professional dancer himself, purposely cast experienced, Broadway trained dancers, rather than the customary hip hop dancers. By combining classically trained Jazz, Ballet and "show" dancers, with "street" and hip hop movement, and adding professional staging and meticulous choreography, her new look and style was established. This started a trend among similar acts.

=== Collaborations ===
Robert Clivilles of C+C Music Factory asked Deborah Cooper to vocalize the song "Reach" for his RobiRob's Clubworld CD. This was his first post C+C project since the passing of his business partner, David Cole. This project was unique as it included the late David Cole's final performance on keyboards.

In 2001, for Producer DJ Victor Calderone Deborah recorded " Are You Satisfied" which was a number 1 dance music hit. Prior to this collaboration, they both had worked with Peter Rauhofer, who was the world's first dance music category Grammy Award Winner to add her unique vocal stylings to "Do It Properly", a cover of the 1987 single by the group 2 Puerto Ricans, A Black Man And A Dominican. In 2002, she won an ASCAP award for her writing and composing the song "Are You Satisfied?"

In 2004, Cooper introduced a popular remix of the "Real Love" collaboration by Rosabel, a house music duo consisting of Producer / DJs Ralphi Rosario from Chicago, Illinois and DJ Abel from Miami, Florida. The new version premiered live when she appeared at the sold-out 2004 Chicago annual Fireball event.

In 2005, with DJ Producer Tony Moran, she recorded "Live You All Over" which quickly rose up the charts to number 2. This track was released as a CD single and on Moran's "Tour De Beats" compilation.

In January 2007, she began a world tour with longtime friend and personal appearance manager Scott Sherman, which included domestic and international dates. Cooper was also working on a book project.

In 2009, Deborah's deep and rich vocals appear on "Erick Morillo feat Deborah Cooper – I Get Lifted".

In 2013, Deborah Cooper reunited with Tony Moran to do vocals for the song "Heartbeat" and it peaked at number 3 on the Billboard's Dance Club Songs chart.

== Discography ==
Many of these releases are further remixed, modified and re-released by professional DJs and Producers at later dates.

- "A Deeper Love"* (PRIDE) Hot Dance Music/Club Play
- "Pride" (In the Name of Love) Hot Dance Music/Club Play
- "Keep It Coming" – Rap Version
- "Keep It Coming" – Dance Version No. 1 Billboard Hot Dance Music/Club Play Chart
- "Things That Make You Go Hmmm..."
- "Reach"
- "Real Love" No. 4 Hot Dance Music/Club Play
- "Real Love (Rosabel Remix)
- "Are You Satisfied" No. 1 Top Position Hot Dance Music/Club Play for 2 weeks
- "Do It Properly"
- "Live You All Over" No. 2 Hot Dance Music/Club Play
- "I Get Lifted" Erick Morillo feat Deborah Cooper – I Get Lifted
- "Heartbeat" Deborah Cooper vs. Tony Moran

== See also ==
- List of number-one dance hits (United States)
- List of artists who reached number one on the US Dance chart
