= The Brat Pack (duo) =

American musical duo

- Origin: New Jersey, United States
- Genres: House; pop
- Labels: A&M
- Past members: Patrick Donovan; Ray Ray Frazier

The Brat Pack was an American vocal duo from New Jersey. Its members were Patrick Donovan (born July 26, 1958, in Passaic, New Jersey) and Ray Ray Frazier. Donovan had been the guitarist for house/gospel artists CeCe Rogers and Curtis Hairston. Ray Ray was keyboard player and vocalist in various New York City bands. The Brat Pack were produced by Robert Clivillés and David Cole, who became the multi-platinum founders of C+C Music Factory. They began as a house music club act, and after success with their first single, Clivillés and Cole felt that they had pop-crossover appeal. They toured the UK and the US extensively and made many television appearances, including Soul Train, Club MTV, and the UK television dance show The Hitman and Her. They released one self-titled album in 1990 on A&M Records' dance-music subsidiary Vendetta Records, producing three singles: "So Many Ways (Do It Properly Pt. II)", "You're the Only Woman", and "I'm Never Gonna Give You Up". "You're the Only Woman" hit the Billboard Hot 100, peaking at No. 36.

== Discography ==
Studio albums

- The Brat Pack (1990)

Singles

- "So Many Ways (Do It Properly Pt. II)" (1990)
- "You're the Only Woman" (1990)
- "I'm Never Gonna Give You Up" (1990)
