= 2 Puerto Ricans, a Blackman and a Dominican =

American house music group

2 Puerto Ricans, a Blackman and a Dominican was a short-lived house music group featuring David Morales and Robert Clivillés (Puerto Ricans), David Cole (Black), and Chep Nuñez (Dominican). In 1987, they scored a hit in dance clubs with their debut song, "Do It Properly"—their only release on Grooveline Records. The track was inspired by Cole and Bruce Forest's DJ sets at the New York City club "Better Days", where Cole, Clivillés, and Morales all performed in the late 1980s (Clivillés and Morales as DJ and Cole as keyboardist). The single was released in the United Kingdom on London Records. It entered the UK singles chart on June 13, 1987, and reached a peak of no. 47, remaining on the chart for four weeks.

In 1988, Clivillés and Cole recorded a sequel song, "So Many Ways (Do It Properly Part II)", with the Brat Pack, on Vendetta/A&M Records. "Do It Properly" was also covered in 1999 by the dance music project the Collaboration, with Deborah Cooper on vocals. Cooper went on to work with another Clivillés and Cole project, C+C Music Factory.

In 1989, the group released a third song, "Scandalous", on Capitol Records in the US and Syncopate Records in the UK. Later in 1989, Clivillés and Cole launched C+C Music Factory. Morales and Clivillés both had successful solo careers in the 1990s, Nuñez died in 1990, and Cole died in 1995.
