= Notice Me (Sandée song) =

Single by Sandeé

from the album Only Time Will Tell
- Released: 1988
- Genre: Dance-pop, Freestyle
- Length: 4:12 (album version)
- Label: Fever
- Songwriter(s): Robert Clivillés
- Producer(s): Clivillés & Cole

Sandeé singles chronology
"You're the One" (1987)	"Notice Me" (1988)	"Love Desire" (1991)

"Notice Me" is the first single from freestyle singer Sandeé's debut album Only Time Will Tell.

== Track listing ==
Germany Maxi-single

No.	Title	Length
1.	"Notice Me" (Club Vocal)	7:42
2.	"Notice Me" (Drumpella)	5:33
3.	"Notice Me" (Notice the House Mix)	8:30
4.	"Notice Me" (Dubbin' at Studio 54)	4:12

1994 Remixes

No.	Title	Length
1.	"Notice Me" (Max Suite Version)	6:44
2.	"Notice Me" (Afrom Morning Mix)	6:44
3.	"Notice Me" (Deep Remix)	5:47

== Charts ==
Chart (1989)	Peak Position
U.S. Billboard Hot Dance Music/Club Play	9
U.S. Billboard Hot Dance Music/Maxi-Singles Sales	17
U.S. Billboard Hot R&B/Hip-Hop Singles & Tracks	62

Cover Version In 1993, Hong Kong singer Stephanie Che covered this song in Cantonese.

== See also ==
- Nikki (singer)
