= The 28th Street Crew =

American house music duo

The 28th Street Crew was a short-lived house music group featuring David Cole and Robert Clivillés, who previously used the alias The Done Properly Posse!.

In 1989, the group released an album, I Need a Rhythm, and a single of the same name, on Vendetta/A&M Records. This single would later be featured in the video game Grand Theft Auto: San Andreas on the fictional radio station SF-UR in 2004. Also in 1989, Clivillés and Cole started the much more successful dance project C+C Music Factory.

The 28th Street Crew released another single called "O'" in 1994 on the Ministry of Sound label.
