= Yamaha CS-15 =

Monophonic analogue synthesizer

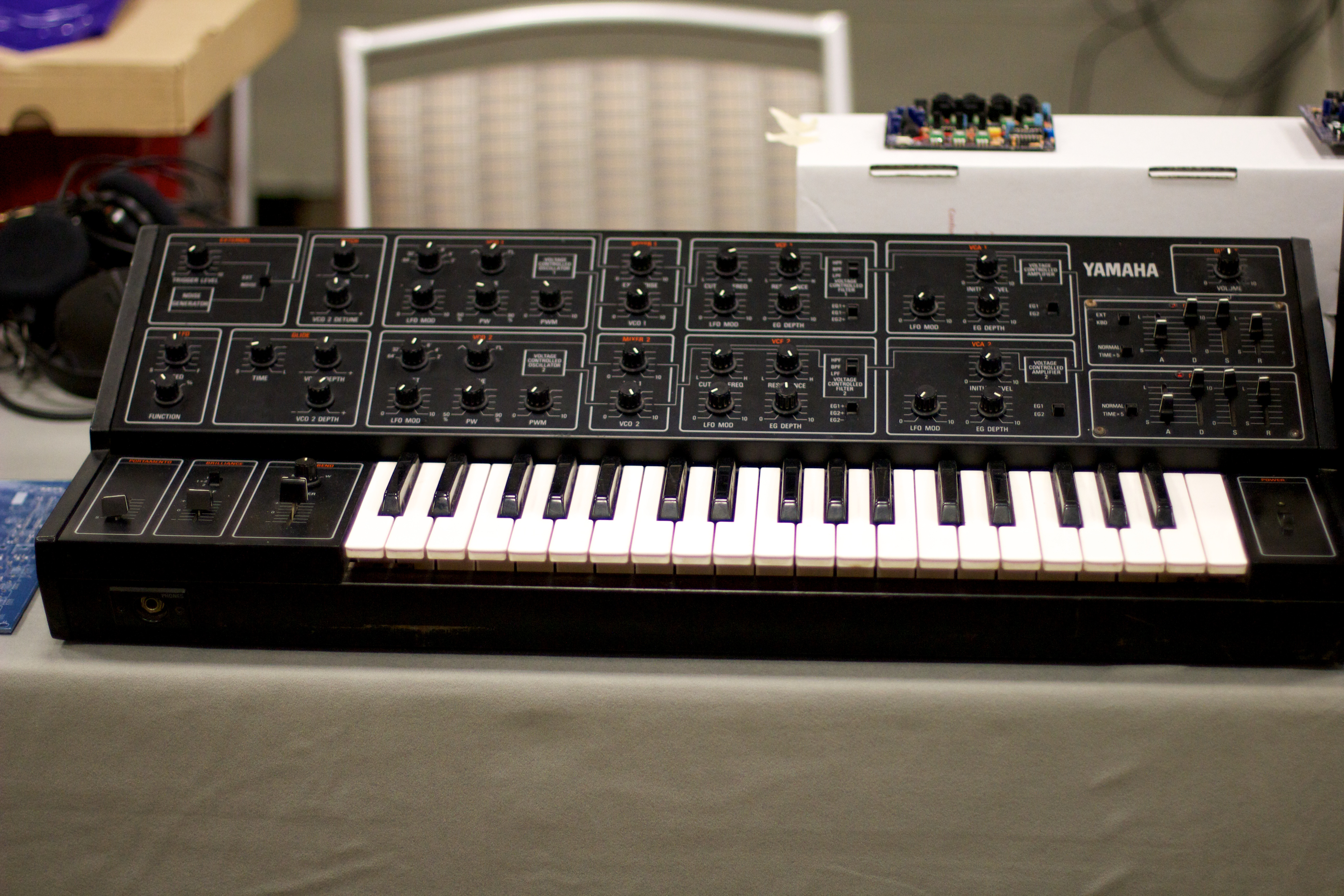
- Yamaha CS-15
- Dates: 1979-1982
- Price: £799 GBP $999 US

Technical specifications
- Polyphony: Monophonic
- Timbrality: 2 part
- Oscillator: 2 (Pulse, Saw Down, Sine, Square, White Noise)
- LFO: 1 (triangle, saw and S&H waveforms)
- Synthesis type: Analog Subtractive
- Filter: 2 (12dB Slope (2-pole), Band Pass, High Pass, Low Pass, Resonance)
- Attenuator: 2 (ADSR)
- Storage memory: None
- Effects: None

Input/output
- Keyboard: 37 keys
- Left-hand control: Pitch bend
- External control: CV/gate

The Yamaha CS-15 is a monophonic analog synthesizer produced by Yamaha from 1979 to 1982.

In the CS series, the CS-5, CS-10, CS-30 and CS-30L were similar in sound, structure and design. The CS-5 and CS-10 had a single oscillator and one multimode filter, whereas the CS-15, CS-30 and CS-30L each had two oscillators that could be routed in various ways through two multimode filters.

== Architecture ==
It features two voltage-controlled oscillators, two 12 dB/Oct multi-mode Voltage-controlled filter (Low-Pass, High-Pass or Band-Pass), two ADSR envelopes and a Low-Frequency Oscillator. It also features a White noise and an external-in for processing other sounds.

The CS-15 offers a great flexibility with various routing possibilities to the filters and envelopes. You can, for example, route VCO 1 to both VCFs and the VCFs to any of the envelopes positive or negative voltage.

It's actually a duophonic / bitimbral synthesizer but you have to connect it two separate CV/Gate controls (Hz/V like Korg synthesizers not V/Oct) to play the extra voice.

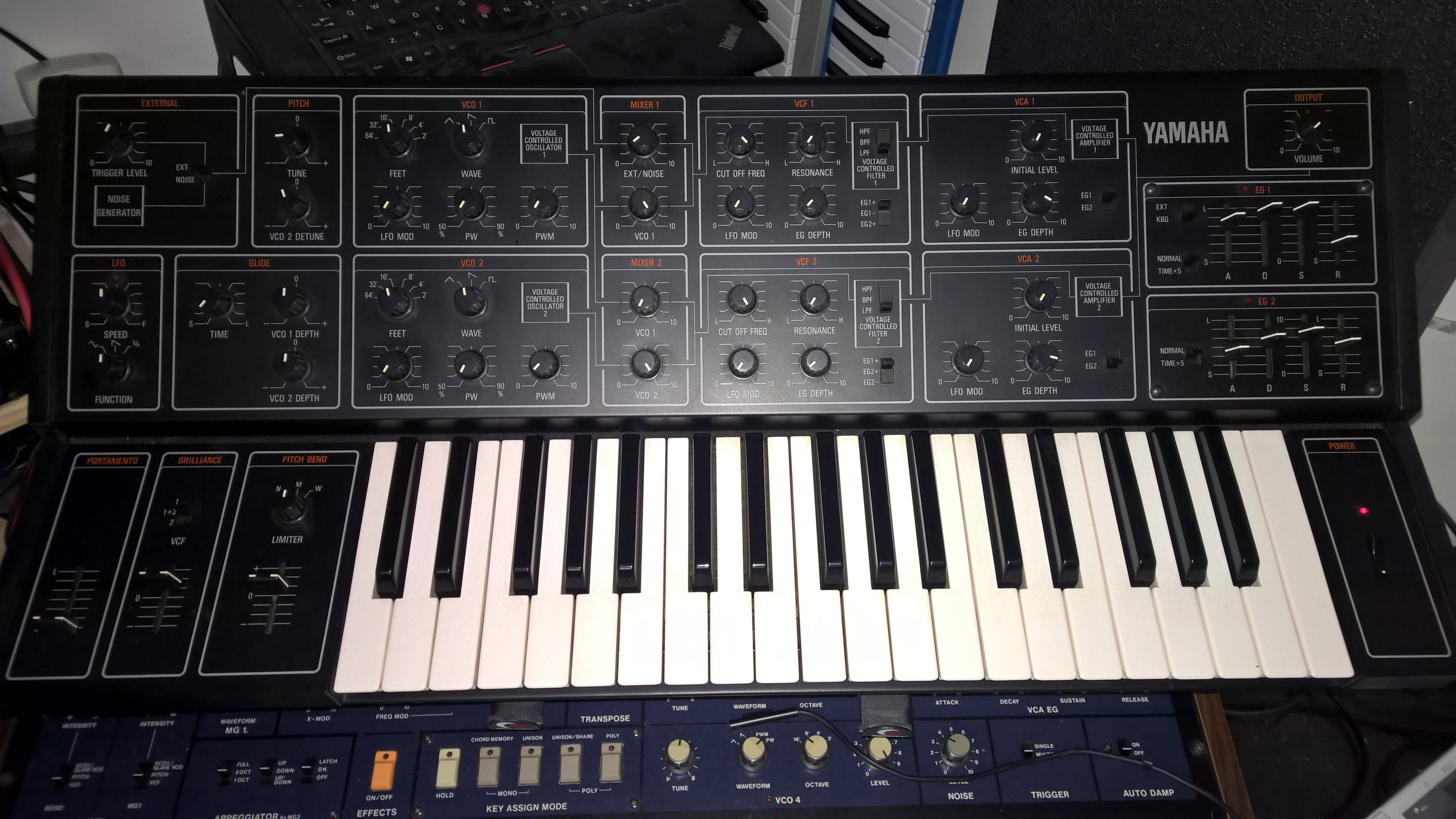
Yamaha CS-15

== Notable users ==
The CS-15 was used by several bands in the early 1980s. The Human League made prominent use of the instrument on their album Dare. Marillion used a CS-15 on their first full-length album, Script for a Jester's Tear. Boyd Jarvis, a producer and early pioneer of house music, started out with a CS-15 as his first synthesizer.

== See also ==
- CS-60
- CS-80
