= Sandeé =

Sandee
- Also known as: Sandra Tola Harvey
- Born: Sandra Tola Casañas; January 19, 1962
- Died: December 15, 2008 (aged 46) Hollywood, Florida, United States
- Genres: Freestyle
- Occupation: Singer
- Instrument: Vocals

Sandra Tola Harvey (née Casañas; January 19, 1962 – December 15, 2008), professionally known as Sandeé or Sandée, was an American freestyle music vocalist and an original member of the trio Exposé from 1983 to 1986, along with Alejandra "Alé" Lorenzo and Laurie Miller.

As a solo artist, Sandée released the singles "You're the One" and "Notice Me" (produced by C+C Music Factory), and an album, Only Time Will Tell, featuring the single "Love Desire". "You're the One" peaked at No. 11 on the Billboard Hot Dance Music/Maxi-Single Sales in 1987 and single "Notice Me" peaked at No. 9 on the Billboard Hot Dance Music/Club Play chart in 1989.

On December 15, 2008, Sandée was found dead in her Hollywood, Florida, home. The cause of death was determined to be a severe seizure. She was 46 years old. Services were held on December 20 at Fred Hunter's funeral home.

== Discography ==
=== Studio albums ===
Year	Album details
1991	Only Time Will Tell: Released: 1991; Label: Fever/RAL/Columbia/SME Records; Formats: Cassette, CD, LP

=== Singles ===
Year	Single	Chart positions				Album
Year	Single	US	U.S. Dance	U.S. Dance Sales	U.S. R&B	Album
1987	"Always Beside Me"	—	—	—	—	7"/12" Single
1987	"You're the One"	—	40	—	—	7"/12" Single
1988	"Notice Me"	—	9	17	62	Only Time Will Tell
1991	"Love Desire"	49	21	5	83	Only Time Will Tell
