= Vendetta Records =

American record label

- Parent company: A&M Records
- Founded: 1988

Vendetta Records was a dance record label subsidiary of A&M Records. It was launched in 1988, but it was shut down in 1990, shortly after its parent company was purchased by PolyGram.

== Artists ==
- Brat Pack
- Denise Lopez
- Reimy
- Dirty South
- The 28th Street Crew
- Seduction
- Maurice
- Knight Time
- Michael Bow
- Victor Simonelli

== See also ==
- List of record labels
