= C+C Music Factory =

American musical group

- Also known as: Clivillés and Cole; the 28th Street Crew
- Origin: New York City, New York, U.S.
- Genres: House; eurodance; hip hop; new jack swing; pop; hip house
- Years active: 1989–1996; 2010–2011
- Labels: Vendetta; A&M; PolyGram; Columbia; SME; MCA
- Past members: Robert Clivillés; Eric Kupper; David Cole; Zelma Davis; Martha Wash; Freedom Williams; Deborah Cooper; Duran Ramos; Angel DeLeon; Joey Kid; Paul Pesco; Q-Unique; Scarlett Santana

C+C Music Factory (Note: Also stylized as C + C and C & C.) was an American musical group formed in 1989 by David Cole and Robert Clivillés. The group is best known for their five hit singles: "Gonna Make You Sweat (Everybody Dance Now)", "Here We Go (Let's Rock & Roll)", "Things That Make You Go Hmmm...", "Just a Touch of Love", and "Keep It Comin' (Dance Till You Can't Dance No More)". The band stopped recording in 1996, following Cole's death. In 2010, C+C Music Factory reformed with Eric Kupper replacing Cole. Original member Freedom Williams acquired trademark rights to the name in 2003 and still tours under that moniker.

C+C Music Factory have earned 35 music industry awards, including five Billboard Music Awards, five American Music Awards, and two MTV Video Music Awards. In December 2016, Billboard named them the 44th-most successful dance act.

== History ==
=== 1987–1989: Early beginnings and the 28th Street Crew ===
David Cole and Robert Clivillés became friends when they both performed at the New York City club Better Days (Clivillés as DJ and Cole as keyboardist) in the late 1980s. In 1987, Clivillés and Cole formed a short-lived house music group called 2 Puerto Ricans, a Blackman and a Dominican, which also included David Morales (who, like Clivillés, was a resident DJ at Better Days) and Chep Nuñez. They released two minor hit singles, "Do It Properly" (1987) and "So Many Ways (Do It Properly Part II)" (1988). In 1989, they released their final single, "Scandalous", before disbanding.

Following the breakup of their previous group, Clivillés and Cole continued to record music together under the name the 28th Street Crew. In mid-1989, the duo released an album titled I Need a Rhythm, whose title track and lead single peaked at no. three on Billboard's dance chart. In September 1989, the female group Seduction released their debut album, Nothing Matters Without Love, which was entirely produced by Clivillés and Cole. The record became certified Gold in the United States.

=== 1989–1992: C+C Music Factory and Gonna Make You Sweat ===
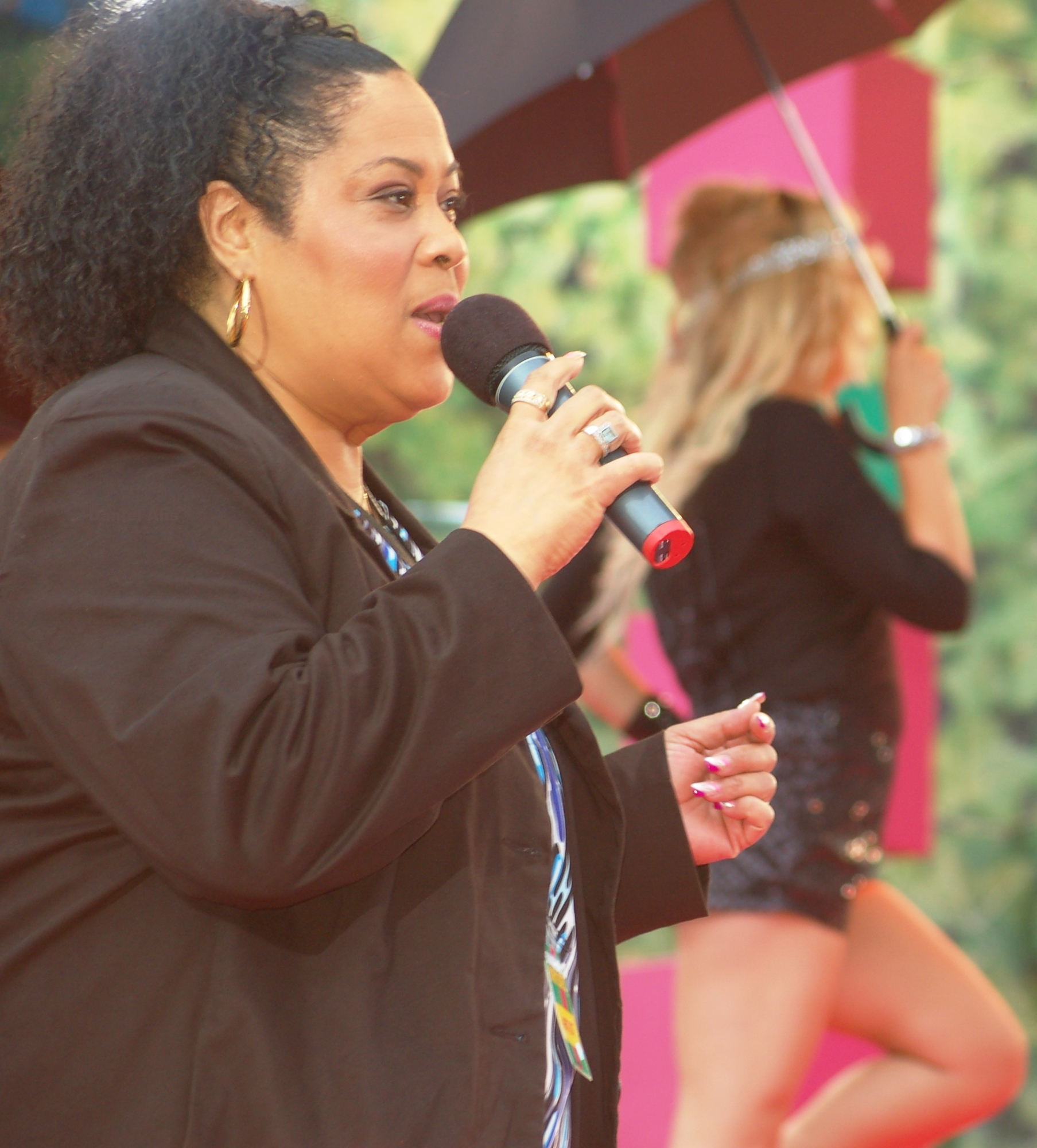
Martha Wash (pictured), uncredited female singer of "Gonna Make You Sweat (Everybody Dance Now)"

In 1989, Clivillés and Cole released a single called "Get Dumb! (Free Your Body)" under the moniker the Crew, featuring rapper Freedom Williams. The same year, the duo formed the group C+C Music Factory, which included Williams as well as the Liberian singer/dancer Zelma Davis. In December 1990, C+C Music Factory released their debut album, Gonna Make You Sweat, which peaked at No. 2 on Billboard's Top 200 Albums chart. The lead single, "Gonna Make You Sweat (Everybody Dance Now)", which featured rapping by Williams and uncredited lead vocals by Martha Wash, became an international hit and peaked at No. 1 on Billboard's Hot 100. The single went on to sell over a million copies in the United States, becoming certified Platinum. The success of the single bolstered the album's success, helping it achieve multi-platinum status for sales exceeding five million copies in the US.

In 1991, the group released two top-ten singles, "Here We Go (Let's Rock & Roll)" and "Things That Make You Go Hmmm..." (inspired by a phrase uttered periodically by late-night talk show host Arsenio Hall), both of which became certified gold in the US. In August, the album's final single, "Just a Touch of Love", which included vocals by Davis, earned the group their fourth number-one dance hit. The song was also featured on the soundtrack of the 1992 musical comedy film Sister Act. In 1992, C+C Music Factory embarked on their first international tour. During certain legs of the tour, Deborah Cooper, a backing vocalist from their album, was hired as a lead vocalist for specific concert venues as Davis was awaiting green card clearance. Also in 1992, the group released the single "Keep It Comin' (Dance Till You Can't Dance No More)", featuring Cooper and rapper Q-Unique on vocals. It became their fifth song to top the Billboard dance chart and was also featured on the soundtrack of the comedy horror film Buffy the Vampire Slayer, released that year. By the end of 1992, the group had earned a total of four American Music Awards, including one for Favorite Pop/Rock Band/Duo/Group.

=== 1994–1996: Subsequent releases and hiatus ===
In 1994, C+C Music Factory experienced a lineup change: Wash, who had just settled a lawsuit with the group, was asked to join as a full-time vocalist. Williams left the group to pursue a solo career and was replaced by the vocal trio Trilogy. In August 1994, the group released their second album, titled Anything Goes!, which performed poorly on Billboard's Top 200 Albums chart. The lead single, "Do You Wanna Get Funky", which featured vocals from Davis, Wash, and Trilogy, became a success on the Billboard charts and earned the group their sixth number-one dance hit. The album also featured two minor hits, "Take a Toke" and "I Found Love".

On January 24, 1995, David Cole died from spinal meningitis. Despite the death of one of their core members, C+C Music Factory embarked on another international tour. In November 1995, they released their self-titled third album. The record was released by Robert Clivillés using the C+C Music Factory name, though it did not feature any musical contributions from Cole, Davis, or Wash, but retained the vocal contributions of Trilogy. The album's lead single, "I'll Always Be Around", became their seventh number-one dance hit. The second single, "Don't Stop the Remix", was the group's final release before disbanding.

In October 1996, Clivillés released an album of new material under the name Robi-Rob's Clubworld. The same year, a compilation titled Robi Rob's Clubworld – House of Sound presents Clubworld Shut Up and Dance was released exclusively in Japan. The album contains past singles and unreleased material recorded by C+C Music Factory.

=== 2010–2011: Comeback ===
C+C Music Factory reformed in 2010, with Eric Kupper replacing Cole. They released the song "Live Your Life", featuring singer Scarlett Santana, which was included on DJ Bill Coleman's compilation album Remixxer. In August 2011, Santana released the single "Rain", which was produced by C+C Music Factory (composed of Clivillés and Kupper credited as CnC Music Factory).

== Legacy ==
As of 1995, C+C Music Factory have accumulated a total of seven number-one dance songs. "Gonna Make You Sweat (Everybody Dance Now)" was included in the top-ten VH1's "100 Greatest Dance Songs".

In 2003, Freedom Williams acquired the federal trademark to use the name "C and C Music Factory" for live performances. Williams toured under that name until renewing his trademark to "C & C Music Factory" in 2014. As of 2014, Williams has owned the trademark rights for the name for all related efforts, not just live performances. Founding producer Clivillés has labeled this "the biggest insult in the world".

== Lawsuits ==
In 1990, the Crew, a group composed of Clivillés, Cole, and Williams, released the single "Get Dumb! (Free Your Body)". The song featured an unauthorized sample of Boyd Jarvis' 1983 song "The Music Got Me". Jarvis filed a lawsuit against Cole and Clivillés as well as A&M Records. The court ruled in favor of Jarvis.

Following the release of "Gonna Make You Sweat (Everybody Dance Now)" in November 1990, C+C Music Factory was hit with a lawsuit by Martha Wash, whose vocals were uncredited on the chorus. The song used an edited compilation of vocal parts that Wash recorded in June 1990 for an unrelated demo tape. After discovering that the group was using Zelma Davis in the music video, Wash attempted to negotiate with Clivillés and Cole for sleeve credits and royalties, which ultimately proved unsuccessful. On December 11, 1991, Wash filed a lawsuit in the Los Angeles Superior Court against Clivillés and Cole, charging the producers and their record company, Sony Music Entertainment, with fraud, deceptive packaging, and commercial appropriation. The case was eventually settled in 1994 and, as a result of the settlement, Sony made an unprecedented request to MTV to add a disclaimer that credited Wash for vocals and Davis (who lip-synched Wash's vocals in the official music video) for "visualization" to the "Gonna Make You Sweat" music video.

== Discography ==
=== Studio albums ===
Year	Album details	Peak chart positions									Certifications (sales threshold)
Year	Album details	US	US R&B	AUS	AUT	NL	NZ	SWE	SWI	UK	Certifications (sales threshold)
1990	Gonna Make You Sweat: First studio album; Release date: December 13, 1990; Label: Columbia	2	11	7	26	59	3	30	13	8	RIAA: 5× Platinum; ARIA: Platinum; BPI: Gold; MC: 4× Platinum
1994	Anything Goes!: Second studio album; Release date: August 9, 1994; Label: Columbia	106	39	36	—	63	25	—	46	—	
1995	C+C Music Factory: Third studio album; Release date: December 5, 1995; Label: MCA	—	—	—	—	—	—	—	—	—	
1995	"—" denotes releases that did not chart										

=== Compilations ===
Year	Album details	Peak chart positions
Year	Album details	AUS
1995	Ultimate: Compilation; Release date: 1995; Label: Columbia	98

=== Singles ===
Year	Single	Peak chart positions									Certifications (sales thresholds)	Album
Year	Single	US	US Dance	AUS	GER	NED	NZ	SWE	SWI	UK	Certifications (sales thresholds)	Album
1990	"Gonna Make You Sweat (Everybody Dance Now)" (featuring Martha Wash and Freedom Williams)	1	1	3	1	1	2	5	1	3	RIAA: 2× Platinum; ARIA: Gold; BPI: Gold; RMNZ: Platinum	Gonna Make You Sweat
1991	"Here We Go (Let's Rock & Roll)" (featuring Zelma Davis and Freedom Williams)	3	1	20	14	15	9	33	11	20	RIAA: Gold	Gonna Make You Sweat
1991	"Things That Make You Go Hmmm..." (featuring Zelma Davis and Freedom Williams)	4	1	6	27	19	2	14	15	4	RIAA: Gold; ARIA: Gold	Gonna Make You Sweat
1991	"Just a Touch of Love" (featuring Zelma Davis)	50	1	26	—	47	21	—	21	31		Gonna Make You Sweat
1992	"Keep It Comin' (Dance Till You Can't Dance No More)" (featuring Q-Unique and Deborah Cooper)	83	1	46	—	30	17	—	—	34		Buffy the Vampire Slayer - OST
1994	"Do You Wanna Get Funky" (featuring Martha Wash, Zelma Davis, and Trilogy)	40	1	11	41	18	2	37	—	27	ARIA: Gold	Anything Goes!
1994	"Take a Toke"^{[A]}	—	23	—	88	—	—	—	—	26		Anything Goes!
1995	"I Found Love" (featuring Zelma Davis)^{[A]}	—	13	—	—	—	—	—	—	26		Anything Goes!
1995	"I'll Always Be Around"	—	1	—	—	—	38	51	—	42		C+C Music Factory
1996	"Don't Stop the Remix"	—	—	—	—	—	—	—	—	—		C+C Music Factory
"—" denotes releases that did not chart

== Notes ==
- A "I Found Love" and "Take a Toke" were released as a double A-side in the UK, charting at number 26 in February 1995.

== See also ==
- Clivillés and Cole
- List of number-one hits (United States)
- List of artists who reached number one on the Hot 100 (U.S.)
- List of Number 1 Dance Hits (United States)
- List of artists who reached number one on the U.S. Dance chart
- MVP
