= Robert Clivillés =

American record producer and musician (born 1964)

- Also known as: Robi Rob
- Born: Robert Manuel Clivillés; July 30, 1964 (age 62)
- Origin: New York City, U.S.
- Genres: Electronic; house
- Occupations: Producer; remixer
- Years active: 1980–present
- Formerly of: Clivillés and Cole; C+C Music Factory; MVP

Robert Manuel Clivillés (Spanish pronunciation: [kliβiˈʎes]; born July 30, 1964) is an American record producer, songwriter, arranger, and music video director most noted for his work with C+C Music Factory, a group he founded in 1989 with musical partner David Cole. He is of Puerto Rican ancestry.

Clivillés and Cole also produced and wrote various hits for other artists, such as Mariah Carey, Whitney Houston, Aretha Franklin, Donna Summer, James Brown, Lisa Lisa and Cult Jam, Deborah Cooper, Scarlett Santana, and many others.

In 2015, Clivillés made his debut as a solo artist with the song "Set Me Free".

== Musical career ==
Originally from East Harlem, Robert Clivillés was a resident DJ in the New York City nightclub Better Days in the late 1980s, while David Cole was the resident keyboardist there, and the two became friends.

In that period, Clivillés and Cole were members of the acts 2 Puerto Ricans, a Blackman and a Dominican and the 28th Street Crew. They also produced the short-lived duo the Brat Pack, and they were additionally responsible for the formation of the pop group Seduction, for whom they wrote and produced a string of top-ten hits. Moreover, they contributed to the career of former Weather Girls vocalist Martha Wash, who at the same time was one of the lead vocalists for the Italian house project Black Box. However, the duo's most successful act was C+C Music Factory, founded in 1989, which became a worldwide sensation in 1991. In 1990, under the name the Crew, Clivillés and Cole released a single called "Get Dumb! (Free Your Body)", featuring later bandmate rapper Freedom Williams.

After the death of David Cole in 1995, Clivillés continued to keep the C+C Music Factory legacy alive through his own production work. The same year, he released a song under that moniker, titled "I'll Always Be Around", on MCA Records. A self-titled studio album was issued by MCA in 1995 in Europe but not in the United States; this was the final record to be released under the band name. Later in 1995, Columbia/SME Records issued Ultimate, a greatest-hits collection featuring a collection of remixes and album versions of C+C Music Factory's Sony Music Entertainment singles.

In October 1996, Clivillés released an album of new material titled Robi-Rob's Clubworld. The first single, "Shake That Body", featured Ya Kid K, formerly of Technotronic. The second one, "Reach", was a collaboration with Hex Hector and featured vocals from longtime C+C Music Factory vocalist Deborah Cooper; it was the final release to include piano tracks recorded by David Cole.

In the 2000s, Clivillés was a member of the group MVP, releasing two studio albums with them. In 2010, C+C Music Factory reformed, with Eric Kupper stepping in to replace David Cole. In May 2015, Clivillés made his solo debut on Billboard's Hot Dance Club Songs chart with the song "Set Me Free", featuring vocals by Kimberly Davis of the group Chic. The music video for the single makes a reference to his father's suicide.

In June 2021, he produced the song "Yo Soy Latino (Vamos a Bailar)" by Latinos Del Mundo. In August of the same year, he was interviewed by director Maria Soccor for the documentary Freestyle Music: The Legacy.

== Controversy ==
In 1989, Clivillés and Cole wrote a song titled "Get Dumb! (Free Your Body)" that they originally performed under the name the Crew and which featured Freedom Williams; it was later performed by Seduction. In 1990, Boyd Jarvis sued Clivillés and Cole for copyright infringement, alleging that they illegally sampled portions of a 1983 song he wrote, titled "The Music Got Me". Jarvis demanded $15 million in royalties.

Four years later, Kevin McCord filed a copyright infringement lawsuit against Mariah Carey, Clivillés, Cole, and Columbia Records, because, according to McCord, they took parts of his song "I Want to Thank You", which he wrote for his former One Way bandmate Alicia Myers (becoming a minor solo hit for her) and created "Make It Happen" out of it without permission. Although the allegations were proven false, McCord eventually accepted a settlement offer of about US$500,000.

== Discography ==
=== with 2 Puerto Ricans, a Blackman and a Dominican ===
- "Do It Properly" (single) (1987)
- "Scandalous" (single) (1989)

=== with the 28th Street Crew ===
- I Need a Rhythm (1989)
- "O" (1994)

=== with the Crew ===
- "Get Dumb! (Free Your Body) (feat. Freedom Williams)" (single) (1990)

=== with C+C Music Factory ===
Year	Album details	Peak chart positions									Certifications (sales threshold)
Year	Album details	US	US R&B	AUS	AUT	NL	NZ	SWE	SWI	UK	Certifications (sales threshold)
1990	Gonna Make You Sweat: First studio album; Release date: December 13, 1990; Label: Columbia	2	11	7	26	59	3	30	13	8	RIAA: 5× Platinum; BPI: Gold; MC: 4× Platinum
1994	Anything Goes!: Second studio album; Release date: August 9, 1994; Label: Columbia	106	39	36	—	63	25	—	46	—	
1995	C+C Music Factory: Third studio album; Release date: 1995; Label: MCA	—	—	—	—	—	—	—	—	—	
1995	Ultimate: Compilation; Release date: 1995; Label: Columbia	—	—	—	—	—	—	—	—	—	
"—" denotes releases that did not chart

=== with MVP ===
- Stagga Lee presents MVP (2003)
- Hip Hop, Clubs, Girls & Life Vol. 1 (2006)

=== Solo ===
Albums

- Robi Rob's Clubworld (1996)
- Robi Rob's Clubworld – House of Sound presents Clubworld Shut Up and Dance (1996)

Singles

- "Set Me Free" (feat. Kimberly Davis) (2015)

=== Other releases ===
- Greatest Remixes Vol. 1 (as Clivillés + Cole) (1992)
