= David Cole (music producer) =

American record producer (1962–1995)

- Cole in 1994

Background information
- Born: David Byron Cole; June 3, 1962; Johnson City, Tennessee, U.S.
- Died: January 24, 1995 (aged 32) New York City, U.S.
- Genres: Dance; house
- Occupations: Record producer; remixer
- Years active: 1981–1995
- Formerly of: 2 Puerto Ricans, a Blackman and a Dominican; C+C Music Factory; Clivillés and Cole

David Byron Cole (June 3, 1962 – January 24, 1995) was an American record producer. He was one half of the dance music duo C+C Music Factory, which he founded with his musical partner Robert Clivillés.

Clivillés and Cole also produced various hits for other artists such as Mariah Carey, Aretha Franklin, James Brown, Lisa Lisa and Cult Jam, Deborah Cooper, Whitney Houston, and many others. After Cole's death in 1995, Robert Clivillés continued to keep C+C Music Factory going through his own production work.

== Biography ==
=== Career ===
Cole was a keyboardist in a Tennessee church choir, and in the 1980s, he performed at the New York City nightclub Better Days. Robert Clivillés was a resident DJ there, and the two became friends. At the end of the decade, the two were active in the dance music acts 2 Puerto Ricans, a Blackman and a Dominican and the 28th Street Crew, and they produced the short-lived duo the Brat Pack. Cole also released the solo single "You Take My Breath Away" in 1988. Together with Clivillés, he was responsible for the formation of the pop group Seduction. They contributed to the career of former Weather Girls singer Martha Wash, who at the same time was one of the lead vocalists for the dance act Black Box. The duo's biggest success, however, was C+C Music Factory, founded in 1989. Also in 1989, Clivillés and Cole released a single under the moniker the Crew, titled "Get Dumb! (Free Your Body)", featuring later C+C Music Factory rapper Freedom Williams.

=== Copyright lawsuits ===
1990, Clivillés and Cole were sued for copyright infringement by Boyd Jarvis, who claimed that they illegally sampled portions of his song "The Music Got Me" in their track "Get Dumb! (Free Your Body)", for which he demanded $15 million in royalties.

Four years later, Kevin McCord filed a copyright infringement lawsuit against Mariah Carey, Cole, Clivillés, and Columbia Records, for allegedly using parts of his song "I Want to Thank You" in the track "Make It Happen" without his permission. Although the allegations were proven false, McCord eventually accepted a settlement offer of about US$500,000.

=== Death ===
Cole died on January 24, 1995, after a long illness. The official cause was given as complications from spinal meningitis, though some members of the music community speculated that he died of complications from AIDS; no proof exists of this.

Mariah Carey and Boyz II Men wrote the 1995 song "One Sweet Day" in Cole's memory.

== Discography ==
=== Solo ===
- "You Take My Breath Away" (single) (1988)

=== with 2 Puerto Ricans, a Blackman and a Dominican ===
- "Do It Properly" (single) (1987)
- "Scandalous" (single) (1989)

=== with the 28th Street Crew ===
- I Need a Rhythm (1989)
- "O" (1994)

=== with the Crew ===
- "Get Dumb! (Free Your Body) (feat. Freedom Williams)" (single) (1990)

=== with C+C Music Factory ===
Year	Album details	Peak chart positions									Certifications (sales threshold)
Year	Album details	US	US R&B	AUS	AUT	NL	NZ	SWE	SWI	UK	Certifications (sales threshold)
1990	Gonna Make You Sweat: First studio album; Release date: December 13, 1990; Label: Columbia	2	11	7	26	59	3	30	13	8	RIAA: 5× Platinum; BPI: Gold; MC: 4× Platinum
1994	Anything Goes!: Second studio album; Release date: August 9, 1994; Label: Columbia	106	39	36	—	63	25	—	46	—	
"—" denotes releases that did not chart

=== Other releases ===
- Greatest Remixes Vol. 1 (as Clivillés + Cole) (1992)
