= List of Billboard number-one dance singles of 1994 =

Billboard magazine compiled the top-performing dance singles in the United States during 1994 on two Hot Dance Music charts: the Club Play and the Maxi-Singles Sales. Premiered in 1976, the Club Play chart ranked the most-played singles on dance club based on reports from a national sample of club DJs. The Maxi-Singles Sales chart was launched in 1985 to compile the best-selling dance singles based on retail sales across the United States.

== Charts history ==
Chart history
Issue date	Hot Dance Music/Club Play		Hot Dance Music/Maxi-Singles Sales		Ref.
Issue date	Title	Artist(s)	Title	Artist(s)	Ref.
January 1	"Tradición"	Gloria Estefan	"Getto Jam"	Domino	
January 8	"Show Me"	Ultra Naté	"Getto Jam"	Domino	
January 15	"Love Changes"	MK featuring Alana	"Getto Jam"	Domino	
January 22	"I Love Music"	Rozalla	"U.N.I.T.Y."	Queen Latifah	
January 29	"Queen of the Night"	Whitney Houston	"A Deeper Love" (From Sister Act 2)	Aretha Franklin	
February 5	"Joy"	Staxx of Joy featuring Carol Leeming	"A Deeper Love" (From Sister Act 2)	Aretha Franklin	
February 12	"Big Time Sensuality"	Björk	"A Deeper Love" (From Sister Act 2)	Aretha Franklin	
February 19	"Big Time Sensuality"	Björk	"Groove Thang"	Zhane	
February 26	"A Deeper Love"	Aretha Franklin	"Groove Thang"	Zhane	
March 5	"A Deeper Love"	Aretha Franklin	"Groove Thang"	Zhane	
March 12	"I'm in the Mood"	CeCe Peniston	"Groove Thang"	Zhane	
March 19	"I Want You"	Juliet Roberts	"Gin And Juice"	Snoop Doggy Dogg	
March 26	"I Want You"	Juliet Roberts	"Gin And Juice"	Snoop Doggy Dogg	
April 2	"Got to Get It"	Culture Beat	"C.R.E.A.M. (Cash Rules Everything Around Me)"	Wu-Tang Clan	
April 9	"So into You"	Michael Watford	"Bump N' Grind"	R. Kelly	
April 16	"Beautiful People"	Barbara Tucker	"Bump N' Grind"	R. Kelly	
April 23	"Moving on Up"	M People	"Bump N' Grind"	R. Kelly	
April 30	"Moving on Up"	M People	"Anything"	SWV	
May 7	"Love & Happiness"	River Ocean featuring India	"Got Me Waiting"	Heavy D. & The Boyz	
May 14	"I Believe"	Sounds of Blackness	"Bucktown" / "Let's Git It On"	Smif-N-Wessun	
May 21	"100% Pure Love"	Crystal Waters	"Bucktown" / "Let's Git It On"	Smif-N-Wessun	
May 28	"100% Pure Love"	Crystal Waters	"Bucktown" / "Let's Git It On"	Smif-N-Wessun	
June 4	"I'll Take You There"	General Public	"Bucktown" / "Let's Git It On"	Smif-N-Wessun	
June 11	"Good Time"	Sound Factory	"Any Time, Any Place" / "Throb"	Janet Jackson	
June 18	"I Want It, I Need It (Real Love)"	Saundra Williams	"Any Time, Any Place" / "Throb"	Janet Jackson	
June 25	"Worker Man"	Patra	"Nappy Heads"	Fugees (Tranzlator Crew)	
July 2	"Misled"	Céline Dion	"Nappy Heads"	Fugees (Tranzlator Crew)	
July 9	"Misled"	Céline Dion	"Take It Easy"	Mad Lion	
July 16	"When You Made the Mountain"	Opus III	"Take It Easy"	Mad Lion	
July 23	"Feel What You Want"	Kristine W	"Take It Easy"	Mad Lion	
July 30	"Caught in the Middle"	Juliet Roberts	"Take It Easy"	Mad Lion	
August 6	"The Right Kinda Lover"	Patti LaBelle	"Take It Easy"	Mad Lion	
August 13	"Bring Me Your Love"	Deee-Lite	"Take It Easy"	Mad Lion	
August 20	"Lifted by Love"	k.d. lang	"Take It Easy"	Mad Lion	
August 27	"Anytime You Need a Friend"	Mariah Carey	"Juicy"	The Notorious B.I.G.	
September 3	"One Night in Heaven"	M People	"Flava In Ya Ear"	Craig Mack	
September 10	"One Night in Heaven"	M People	"Flava In Ya Ear"	Craig Mack	
September 17	"Ain't Nobody"	Jaki Graham	"Flava In Ya Ear"	Craig Mack	
September 24	"Bring Me Joy"	Meechie	"Flava In Ya Ear"	Craig Mack	
October 1	"Another Night"	Real McCoy	"Flava In Ya Ear"	Craig Mack	
October 8	"Do You Wanna Get Funky"	C+C Music Factory	"Flava In Ya Ear"	Craig Mack	
October 15	"Hit by Love"	CeCe Peniston	"Take It Easy"	Mad Lion	
October 22	"Hit by Love"	CeCe Peniston	"Take It Easy"	Mad Lion	
October 29	"Drunk on Love"	Basia	"Word Is Bond"	Brand Nubian	
November 5	"What I Need"	Crystal Waters	"Here Comes The Hotstepper"	Ini Kamoze	
November 12	"Turn the Beat Around"	Gloria Estefan	"Flava In Ya Ear"	Craig Mack	
November 19	"Dreamer"	Livin' Joy	"Bring the Pain"	Method Man	
November 26	"Secret"	Madonna	"Secret"	Madonna	
December 3	"Secret"	Madonna	"Creep"	TLC	
December 10	"Excited"	M People	"Creep"	TLC	
December 17	"Excited"	M People	"Creep"	TLC	
December 24	"Living in Danger"	Ace of Base	"Creep"	TLC	
December 31	"Living in Danger"	Ace of Base	"Creep"	TLC	

== See also ==
- 1994 in music
- List of Billboard Hot 100 number ones of 1994
