= List of Billboard number-one dance singles of 1995 =

Billboard magazine compiled the top-performing dance singles in the United States during 1995 on two Hot Dance Music charts: the Club Play and the Maxi-Singles Sales. Premiered in 1976, the Club Play chart ranked the most-played singles on dance club based on reports from a national sample of club DJs. The Maxi-Singles Sales chart was launched in 1985 to compile the best-selling dance singles based on retail sales across the United States.

== Charts history ==
Chart history
Issue date	Hot Dance Music/Club Play		Hot Dance Music/Maxi-Singles Sales		Ref.
Issue date	Title	Artist(s)	Title	Artist(s)	Ref.
January 7	"Melody of Love (Wanna Be Loved)"	Donna Summer	"Creep"	TLC	
January 14	"Melody of Love (Wanna Be Loved)"	Donna Summer	"Creep"	TLC	
January 21	"Melody of Love (Wanna Be Loved)"	Donna Summer	"Nuttin But Flavor"	Funkmaster Flex & The Ghetto Celebs	
January 28	"I Get Lifted"	Barbara Tucker	"Creep"	TLC	
February 4	"Call Me"	Deee-Lite	"Big Poppa" / "Warning"	The Notorious B.I.G.	
February 11	"Don't Bring Me Down"	Spirits	"Baby"	Brandy	
February 18	"Don't Bring Me Down"	Spirits	"Baby"	Brandy	
February 25	"Everlasting Love"	Gloria Estefan	"Baby"	Brandy	
March 4	"Everlasting Love"	Gloria Estefan	"Baby"	Brandy	
March 11	"Come Back"	Londonbeat	"Dear Mama" / "Old School"	2Pac	
March 18	"Your Loving Arms"	Billie Ray Martin	"Dear Mama" / "Old School"	2Pac	
March 25	"Your Loving Arms"	Billie Ray Martin	"Dear Mama" / "Old School"	2Pac	
April 1	"Never Get Enough"	Waterlilies	"Dear Mama" / "Old School"	2Pac	
April 8	"Atomic"	Blondie	"Run Away"	Real McCoy	
April 15	"Heartbeat"	Jimmy Somerville	"Run Away"	Real McCoy	
April 22	"The Bomb! (These Sounds Fall into My Mind)"	The Bucketheads	"Craziest"	Naughty By Nature	
April 29	"The Bomb! (These Sounds Fall into My Mind)"	The Bucketheads	"Craziest"	Naughty By Nature	
May 6	"Respect"	Judy Cheeks	"Craziest"	Naughty By Nature	
May 13	"Bedtime Story"	Madonna	"I'll Be There For You/You're All I Need To Get By"	Method Man Featuring Mary J. Blige	
May 20	"Keep in Touch (Body to Body)"	Shades of Love featuring Meli'sa Morgan	"I'll Be There For You/You're All I Need To Get By"	Method Man Featuring Mary J. Blige	
May 27	"What Hope Have I"	Sphynx	"I'll Be There For You/You're All I Need To Get By"	Method Man Featuring Mary J. Blige	
June 3	"Open Your Heart"	M People	"I'll Be There For You/You're All I Need To Get By"	Method Man Featuring Mary J. Blige	
June 10	"I'm Ready"	Size 9	"I'll Be There For You/You're All I Need To Get By"	Method Man Featuring Mary J. Blige	
June 17	"Too Many Fish"	Frankie Knuckles featuring Adeva	"Scream" / "Childhood"	Michael Jackson & Janet Jackson	
June 24	"Too Many Fish"	Frankie Knuckles featuring Adeva	"One More Chance" / "Stay With Me"	The Notorious B.I.G.	
July 1	"You"	Staxx of Joy featuring Carol Leeming	"One More Chance" / "Stay With Me"	The Notorious B.I.G.	
July 8	"Space Cowboy"	Jamiroquai	"One More Chance" / "Stay With Me"	The Notorious B.I.G.	
July 15	"Scream"	Michael Jackson and Janet Jackson	"One More Chance" / "Stay With Me"	The Notorious B.I.G.	
July 22	"Scream"	Michael Jackson and Janet Jackson	"One More Chance" / "Stay With Me"	The Notorious B.I.G.	
July 29	"You Bring Me Joy"	Mary J. Blige	"Player's Anthem"	Junior M.A.F.I.A.	
August 5	"As Long as You're Good to Me"	Judy Cheeks	"Player's Anthem"	Junior M.A.F.I.A.	
August 12	"Relax"	Crystal Waters	"Player's Anthem"	Junior M.A.F.I.A.	
August 19	"My Love Is for Real"	Paula Abdul	"Player's Anthem"	Junior M.A.F.I.A.	
August 26	"Come and Get Your Love"	Real McCoy	"Player's Anthem"	Junior M.A.F.I.A.	
September 2	"No More "I Love You's""	Annie Lennox	"How High"	Method Man & Redman	
September 9	"No More "I Love You's""	Annie Lennox	"How High"	Method Man & Redman	
September 16	"Everybody Be Somebody"	Ruffneck featuring Yavahn	"MC's Act Like They Don't Know"	KRS-One	
September 23	"Everybody Be Somebody"	Ruffneck featuring Yavahn	"Real Hip Hop"	Das EFX	
September 30	"Everybody Be Somebody"	Ruffneck featuring Yavahn	"Fantasy"	Mariah Carey	
October 7	"Turn It Out"	Labelle	"Fantasy"	Mariah Carey	
October 14	"We Can Make It"	Moné	"Fantasy"	Mariah Carey	
October 21	"Fantasy"	Mariah Carey	"Fantasy"	Mariah Carey	
October 28	"Fantasy"	Mariah Carey	"Fantasy"	Mariah Carey	
November 4	"Fantasy"	Mariah Carey	"Fantasy"	Mariah Carey	
November 11	"Stay Together"	Barbara Tucker	"Fantasy"	Mariah Carey	
November 18	"I'll Always Be Around"	C+C Music Factory featuring A.S.K. M.E. and Vic Black	"Fantasy"	Mariah Carey	
November 25	"I'll Always Be Around"	C+C Music Factory featuring A.S.K. M.E. and Vic Black	"Exhale (Shoop Shoop)" (From "Waiting to Exhale")	Whitney Houston	
December 2	"Take Me Higher"	Diana Ross	"One Sweet Day"	Mariah Carey & Boyz II Men	
December 9	"Believe in Me"	Raw Stylus	"One Sweet Day"	Mariah Carey & Boyz II Men	
December 16	"Reach"	Lil' Mo' Yin Yang	"No One Else"	Total	
December 23	"Be My Lover"	La Bouche	"One Sweet Day"	Mariah Carey & Boyz II Men	
December 30	"Be My Lover"	La Bouche	"Fu-Gee-La" (Refugee Camp Remix)	Fugees	

== See also ==
- 1995 in music
- List of Billboard Hot 100 number ones of 1995
