= For What You Dream Of =

Single by Bedrock featuring KYO

from the album Trainspotting: Music from the Motion Picture
- Released: 1993
- Length: 10:50
- Label: Stress Records
- Songwriter(s): John Digweed; Nick Muir; Carol Leeming
- Producer(s): Bedrock

Bedrock singles chronology
| "For What You Dream Of" (1993) | "Set in Stone" / "Forbidden Zone" (1997) |

KYO singles chronology
| "Won't Get to Heaven" (1992) | "For What You Dream Of" (1993) | "Joy" (1993) |

"For What You Dream Of" is the debut single by English electronic music duo Bedrock featuring singer Carol Leeming, credited by her stage name KYO. It was originally released in 1993 through Stress Records (part of the DMC group), but was re-released in 1996 after being featured in the film Trainspotting and its soundtrack album, Trainspotting: Music from the Motion Picture. Following its 1996 release, the song was a commercial success, staying at number one on the UK Dance Chart for two weeks, and additionally appearing on the country's national singles chart for three weeks, peaking at number 25.

Prior to its appearance in Trainspotting, the song was included on Sasha & John Digweed's 1994 mix album, Renaissance: The Mix Collection. The song was also remixed by Blue Amazon and Holy Trinity for its re-release.

== Formats and track listings ==
Vinyl – 1993
| No. | Title | Length |
|---|---|---|
| 1. | "For What You Dream Of" (Full On Renaissance Mix) | 10:46 |
| 2. | "For What You Dream Of" (Instrumental Edit) |
| 3. | "For What You Dream Of" (Panel Beater Dub) |

Vinyl – 1996
| No. | Title | Length |
|---|---|---|
| 1. | "For What You Dream Of" (Full On Renaissance Mix) | 10:46 |
| 2. | "For What You Dream Of" (Holy Trinity Remix) | 10:24 |

CD
| No. | Title | Length |
|---|---|---|
| 1. | "For What You Dream Of" (Full On Renaissance Edit) | 4:08 |
| 2. | "For What You Dream Of" (Full On Renaissance Mix) | 10:50 |
| 3. | "For What You Dream Of" (Blue Amazon Beach House Vocal Mix) | 15:41 |
| 4. | "For What You Dream Of" (Holy Trinity Edit) | 8:06 |

== Charts ==
| Chart (1996) | Peak position |
|---|---|
| UK Singles (Official Charts Company) | 25 |
| UK Dance Singles (Official Charts Company) | 1 |

== See also ==
- List of UK Dance Singles Chart number ones of 1996
