= List of UK Dance Singles Chart number ones of 1996 =

These are The Official UK Charts Company UK Dance Chart number one hits of 1996. The dates listed in the menus below represent the Saturday after the Sunday the chart was announced, as per the way the dates are given in chart publications such as the ones produced by Billboard, Guinness, and Virgin.

Issue date	Song	Artist
6 January	"Sex on the Streets"	Pizzaman
13 January	"Sex on the Streets"	Pizzaman
20 January	"Got Myself Together"	The Bucketheads
27 January	"Spaceman"	Babylon Zoo
3 February	"Southside"	Dave Clark
10 February	"Your Love"	Inner City
17 February	"Giv Me Luv"	Alcatraz
24 February	"Children"	Robert Miles
2 March	"Disco's Revenge"	Gusto
9 March	"Be As One"	Sasha & Maria
16 March	"Movin'"	Mone
23 March	"Access"	DJ Misjah & DJ Tim
30 March	"Nekasaki EP"	Ken Doh
6 April	"The Nighttrain"	Kadoc
13 April	"No Other Love"	Blue Amazon
20 April	"I Got the Vibration/A Positive Vibration"	Blackbox
27 April	"(Keep on ) Jumpin'"	Lisa Marie Experience
4 May	"Keep on Jumpin'"	Lisa Marie Experience
11 May	"Klubbhopping"	Klubbheads
18 May	"There's Nothing I Won't Do"	JX
25 May	"Heaven"	Sarah Washington
1 June	"For What You Dream Of"	Bedrock featuring KYO
8 June	"For What You Dream Of"	Bedrock featuring KYO
15 June	"Don't Stop Movin'"	Livin' Joy
22 June	"On Ya Way"	Helicopter
29 June	"Stand Up"	Love Tribe
6 July	"Where Love Lives"	Alison Limerick
13 July	"Keep on Jumpin'"	Todd Terry featuring Martha Wash & Jocelyn Brown
20 July	"Le Voie Le Soleil"	Subliminal Cuts
27 July	"Higher State of Consciousness 96"	Wink
3 August	"Hey Jupiter/Professional Widow"	Tori Amos
10 August	"Do That to Me"	Lisa Marie Experience
17 August	"Hey Jupiter/Professional Widow"	Tori Amos
24 August	"Arms of Loren"	E'voke
31 August	"Want Love"	Hysteric Ego
7 September	"Hot & Wet (I Believe It)"	Tzant
14 September	"I'm Alive"	Stretch & Vern
21 September	"I'm Alive"	Stretch & Vern
28 September	"Seven Days and One Week"	B.B.E.
5 October	"Sugar Is Sweeter"	C. J. Bolland
12 October	"Stamp!"	Jeremy Healy & Amos
19 October	"No Diggity"	Blackstreet featuring Dr. Dre
26 October	"Anomaly - Calling Your Name"	Libra
2 November	"Help Me Make It"	Huff + Puff
9 November	"Jus Come"	Cool Jack
16 November	"Heaven Knows - Deep Deep Down"	Angel Moraes
23 November	"Jump to My Beat"	Wildchild
30 November	"Yeke Yeke96"	Mory Kanté
7 December	"Just Another Groove"	Mighty Dub Katz
14 December	"Snoop's Upside Ya Head"	Snoop Doggy Dog featuring Charlie Wilson
21 December	"Offshore"	Chicane
28 December	"Ultra Flava"	Heller & Farley Project

== See also ==
- 1996 in music
