= Trainspotting (soundtrack) =

Album

Trainspotting: Music from the Motion Picture

Soundtrack album by various artists
- Released: 19 February 1996
- Genres: Britpop; techno; dance; alternative rock; electronica
- Length: 75:27
- Labels: EMI Premier (UK); Capitol (US)

Singles from Trainspotting: Music from the Motion Picture
- 1. "Born Slippy .NUXX" Released: 1 July 1996

Professional ratings
Review scores
Source	Rating
AllMusic	4.5/5 stars
Entertainment Weekly	A
The Guardian	4/5 stars
Q	4/5 stars
Smash Hits	4/5 stars

There have been two soundtrack albums released based on Trainspotting, the 1996 film adaptation of Irvine Welsh's novel of the same name.

The first album was released on 19 February 1996 in the UK and 9 July 1996 in the US. The large fanbase for both the film and the original soundtrack prompted the release of a second soundtrack on 21 October 1997. This second album included songs from the film that did not make the cut for the first album, as well as songs that did not appear in the final film but were involved at earlier stages or were used as inspiration by the filmmakers, and one duplicate song. The popularity of the first volume led EMI to reissue it and continue to press it since 16 June 2003.

In 2007, the editors of Vanity Fair ranked the original Trainspotting soundtrack as the 7th best motion picture soundtrack in history. It was ranked #17 on Entertainment Weekly's 100 Best Movie Soundtracks.

== Track listing ==
=== Trainspotting: Music from the Motion Picture ===
No.	Title	Writer(s)	Producer(s)	Length
1.	"Lust for Life" (Iggy Pop)	David Bowie; Pop	Bewlay Bros.	5:11
2.	"Deep Blue Day" (Brian Eno)	Eno; Daniel Lanois; Roger Eno	Eno; Lanois	3:56
3.	"Trainspotting" (Primal Scream)	Andrew Innes; Robert Young; Bobby Gillespie; Martin Duffy	Andrew Weatherall	10:33
4.	"Atomic" (Sleeper)	Debbie Harry; Jimmy Destri	Stephen Street	5:08
5.	"Temptation" (New Order)	Bernard Sumner; Stephen Morris; Peter Hook; Gillian Gilbert	New Order	6:59
6.	"Nightclubbing" (Pop)	Bowie; Pop	Bowie	4:12
7.	"Sing" (Blur)	Graham Coxon; Alex James; David Rowntree; Damon Albarn	Blur	6:00
8.	"Perfect Day" (Lou Reed)	Reed	Bowie; Mick Ronson	3:43
9.	"Mile End" (Pulp)	Nick Banks; Jarvis Cocker; Steve Mackey; Mark Webber; Candida Doyle; Russell Senior	Chris Thomas	4:30
10.	"For What You Dream Of (Full On Renaissance Mix)" (Bedrock featuring KYO)	John Digweed; Nick Muir; Carol Leeming	Digweed; Muir	6:24
11.	"2:1" (Elastica)	Justine Frischmann; Donna Matthews; Annie Holland; Justin Welch	Marc Waterman; Elastica	2:32
12.	"A Final Hit" (Leftfield)	Neil Barnes; Paul Daley	Leftfield	3:15
13.	"Born Slippy Nuxx" (Underworld)	Rick Smith; Karl Hyde	Smith; Hyde; Darren Emerson	9:43
14.	"Closet Romantic" (Damon Albarn)	Albarn	Street	3:06
Total length:				75:27

=== Certifications and sales ===
Region	Certification	Certified units/sales
Australia (ARIA)	Gold	35,000^{^}
Belgium (BRMA)	Gold	25,000^{*}
Canada (Music Canada)	Platinum	100,000^{^}
France (SNEP)	2× Gold	200,000^{*}
Iceland	—	3,235
New Zealand (RMNZ)	Platinum	15,000^{^}
Spain (Promusicae)	Gold	50,000^{^}
United Kingdom (BPI)	3× Platinum	900,000^{^}
United States (RIAA)	Gold	500,000^{^}
Summaries
Europe (IFPI)	Platinum	1,000,000^{*}
^{*} Sales figures based on certification alone.^{^} Shipments figures based on certification alone.

Trainspotting #2: Music from the Motion Picture

Soundtrack album by various artists
- Released: 7 October 1997
- Genres: Rock, Britpop, electronica, classical
- Length: 71:56
- Labels: EMI Premier (UK); Capitol (US)

Professional ratings
Review scores
Source	Rating
AllMusic	4/5 stars
Music Week	4/5 stars

== Trainspotting #2: Music from the Motion Picture, Vol. #2 ==
No.	Title	Writer(s)	Producer(s)	Length
1.	"Choose Life" (PF Project featuring Ewan McGregor)	Jamie White; Moose	PF Project	7:48
2.	"The Passenger" (Iggy Pop)	Pop; Ricky Gardiner	Bewlay Bros.	4:38
3.	"Dark & Long (Dark Train Mix)" (Underworld)	Rick Smith; Karl Hyde; Darren Emerson	Smith; Hyde; Emerson	9:54
4.	"Habanera from Carmen"	Georges Bizet		2:07
5.	"Statuesque" (Sleeper)	Louise Wener	Stephen Street	3:21
6.	"Golden Years" (David Bowie)	Bowie	Bowie; Harry Maslin	3:59
7.	"Think About the Way" (Ice MC)	Roberto Zanetti	Robyx	4:19
8.	"A Final Hit (Full Length Version)" (Leftfield)	Neil Barnes; Paul Daley	Leftfield	4:55
9.	"Temptation" (Heaven 17)	Glenn Gregory; Ian Craig Marsh; Martyn Ware	B.E.F.; Greg Walsh	3:03
10.	"Nightclubbing (Baby Doc Remix)" (Pop)	Bowie; Pop	Bowie	5:50
11.	"Our Lips Are Sealed" (Fun Boy Three)	Jane Wiedlin; Terry Hall	Richard Gottehrer; Rob Freeman	2:51
12.	"Come Together" (Primal Scream)	Bobby Gillespie; Andrew Innes; Robert Young	Andrew Weatherall	4:55
13.	"Atmosphere" (Joy Division)	Bernard Sumner; Peter Hook; Stephen Morris; Ian Curtis	Martin Hannett	4:07
14.	"Inner City Life" (Goldie)	Clifford Joseph Price; Rob Playford	Goldie	5:45
15.	"Born Slippy Nuxx (Darren Price Mix)" (Underworld)	Smith; Hyde	Smith; Hyde; Emerson	6:29
Total length:				71:56

=== Certifications ===
Region	Certification	Certified units/sales
United Kingdom (BPI)	Silver	60,000^{^}
^{^} Shipments figures based on certification alone.

== Recognition ==
- 2001: Ranked No. 17 on Entertainment Weekly's 100 Best Movie Soundtracks.
- 2007: Editors of Vanity Fair ranked the original Trainspotting soundtrack as the 7th best motion picture soundtrack in history.
- 2013: Ranked No. 13 in Rolling Stone's "The 25 Greatest Soundtracks of All Time"

== Complete film soundtrack ==
The following is a complete list of songs that appear in the film Trainspotting in order of appearance:

1. "Lust for Life" – Iggy Pop
2. "Carmen Suite No.2" – Georges Bizet
3. "Deep Blue Day" – Brian Eno
4. "Trainspotting" – Primal Scream
5. "Temptation"^ – Heaven 17
6. "Atomic" – Blondie
7. "Temptation"^ – New Order
8. "Nightclubbing" – Iggy Pop
9. "Sing" – Blur
10. "Perfect Day" – Lou Reed
11. "Dark and Long (Dark Train)" – Underworld
12. "Think About the Way" – Ice MC
13. "Mile End" – Pulp
14. "For What You Dream Of" (Full On Renaissance Mix) – Bedrock featuring KYO
15. "2:1" – Elastica
16. "Herzlich Tut Mich Verlangen" – Gábor Lehotka
17. "A Final Hit" – Leftfield
18. "Statuesque" – Sleeper
19. "Born Slippy .NUXX" – Underworld
20. "Closet Romantic" – Damon Albarn

^Two songs titled 'Temptation' feature in the movie and soundtracks 1 & 2, however they are completely different songs.

== See also ==
- T2 Trainspotting soundtrack
