= Take Me Higher (song) =

1995 single by Diana Ross

Single by Diana Ross

from the album Take Me Higher
- B-side: "Let Somebody Know"; "Too Many Nights"
- Released: August 5, 1995
- Genre: Dance-pop; disco; house
- Length: 4:13
- Label: Motown
- Songwriters: Narada Michael Walden; Sally Jo Dakota; Nikita Germaine
- Producer: Narada Michael Walden

Diana Ross singles chronology
"Chain Reaction '93" (1993)	"Take Me Higher" (1995)	"Gone" (1995)

Music video
- "Take Me Higher" on YouTube

"Take Me Higher" is a song by American singer Diana Ross, released on August 5, 1995, by Motown Records as the first single from her 21st album of the same name (1995). Co-written and produced by Narada Michael Walden featuring additional credits from Mike Mani, it became Ross' fifth number-one on the Billboard Dance Club Songs chart in the US. In Europe, it entered the top forty in Scotland and the UK, but was an even bigger hit on the UK Dance Chart, peaking at number four.

== Critical reception ==
Larry Flick from Billboard magazine described the song as a "swirling retro disco ditty that inspires a wonderfully loose and playful performance", and complimented its chorus as "instantly infectious and brimming with warm optimism." Gil L. Robertson IV from Cash Box stated that "Lady Ross is in fine form with a confident vocal delivery, while her music backdrop is a throwback to the glory days of disco." The Daily Vault's Mark Millan called it "a fine dance number that Ross revels in". Quincy McCoy from the Gavin Report noted that it "kicks up a happy feeling of nostalgia along with keeping a contemporary feel that brings a smile to your feet." Pan-European magazine Music & Media remarked that here, "La Ross shifts to a higher gear, the pop dance speed."

A reviewer from Music Week rated it three out of five, describing is as "a slight affair". Music Week editor Alan Jones deemed it "a fairly innocuous affair – pleasant, undemanding and vaguely anthemic in its regular mix". Rupert Howe from NME said, "Needless to say Ms Ross' attempts to cut it on a hip-thrusting house track at an age when most women are claiming their bus passes proves to be no 'Chain Reaction'." James Hamilton from the Record Mirror Dance Update declared it as a "soaring anxious wailer" in his weekly dance column. In a retrospective review, Pop Rescue felt that the singer's vocals "are strong and confident in the verses, but a little weaker in the chorus", adding that "she's joined by backing singers to help lift her higher."

== Music video ==
The single's accompanying music video featured scenes of Ross in a cocktail dress on stage, while dancers execute a choreography and the band plays the song, intercut with footage of Ross on the beach. It received solid airplay on American television network BET.

== Track listings ==
- CD single, UK (1995)
1. "Take Me Higher" – 4:21
2. "Let Somebody Know" – 4:57
3. "Too Many Nights" – 4:36
- CD maxi, US (1995)
1. "Take Me Higher" (12-inch mix) – 7:25
2. "Take Me Higher" (dub mix) – 9:34
3. "Take Me Higher" (a capella) – 3:44
4. "Take Me Higher" (LP version) – 4:13
5. "Take Me Higher" (radio edit) – 4:02
6. "Take Me Higher" (instrumental) – 4:11

== Credits and personnel ==
Credits are adapted from the liner notes of Take Me Higher.

- Patti Austin – background vocals
- Angela Bofill – background vocals
- Sally Jo Dakota – writing
- Nikita Germaine – background vocals, writing
- Allen Gregorie – mix engineering
- Sandy Griffith – background vocals
- Kevin Hedge – mixing
- Tony Lindsay – background vocals
- Mike Mani – associate production
- Timmy Regisford – mixing
- Diana Ross – lead vocals
- Narada Michael Walden – production, writing

== Charts ==
=== Weekly charts ===
Chart (1995)	Peak position
Europe (Eurochart Hot 100)	61
Europe (European Hit Radio)	20
Netherlands (Dutch Top 40 Tipparade)	13
Netherlands (Single Top 100 Tipparade)	7
Scottish Singles Sales (Official Charts)	35
UK Singles (Official Charts)	32
UK Dance (Official Charts)	4
US Bubbling Under Hot 100 (Billboard)	14
US Dance Club Songs (Billboard)	1
US Hot R&B/Hip-Hop Songs (Billboard)	77
US Maxi-Singles Sales (Billboard)	8

=== Year-end charts ===
Chart (1995)	Position
UK Club Chart (Music Week)	70
US Dance Club Play (Billboard)	48

== Release history ==
Region	Date	Format(s)	Label(s)	Ref.
United States	August 5, 1995	12-inch vinyl; CD; cassette	Motown	
United Kingdom	August 21, 1995	CD; cassette	EMI United Kingdom	
United States	September 12, 1995	Rhythmic contemporary; contemporary hit radio	Motown	
Australia	October 16, 1995	CD	EMI	
Japan	October 18, 1995	CD	EMI	

== See also ==
- List of number-one dance singles of 1995 (U.S.)
