= Morgan Schiff & Co. =

Investment house

Morgan Schiff & Company
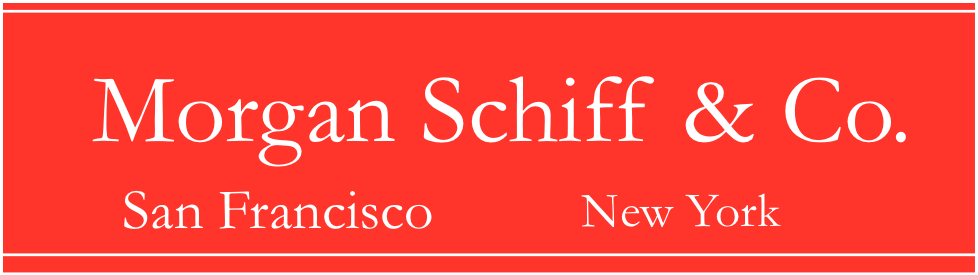
- Company type: Private Partnership
- Industry: Investment Banking, Private Equity
- Founded: 1984
- Founder: Phillip Ean Cohen
- Headquarters: New York City, San Francisco, Melbourne
- Key people: Phillip Ean Cohen, Founder and Chairman; Sterling Brinkley, Senior Partner
- Revenue: USD 550 million (1986)

Morgan Schiff & Co. was an investment house founded by Phillip Ean Cohen which was a prominent Mergers and Acquisitions and Private Equity firm from its founding in the mid-1980s to the late 1990s. The firm was discontinued after the bankruptcy of Friedman's Inc., the largest jewelry bankruptcy of all time.

The firm was named after Jacob Schiff and J.P. Morgan although the firm had no affiliation with either individual.

== History ==
After a power struggle with Jeff Beck, Phillip Ean Cohen left Oppenheimer & Co. to start his own firm. Cohen was offered $1 billion seed funding from Michael Milken, but refused. Despite this, Morgan Schiff initially operated as the Private Equity arm for Drexel Burnham Lambert, and was located directly under Milken's office. Cohen decided to name his firm after two important historical figures on Wall Street, despite their complete lack of affiliation with the firm. When Business Week asked Cohen about the name, he replied, "It was my belief that investment banks should go back to advising clients in a closer format, as in the days of J.P. Morgan and Jacob Schiff." Cohen was considered one of the top minds in Mergers and Acquisitions, and was able to recruit many of his corporate clients from his days at Kuhn Loeb, Lehman Brothers, First Boston, Oppenheimer, and Drexel Burnham Lambert. One of these clients was Zale Corporation, which used Morgan Schiff as an adviser on a $500 million Merger, officially becoming the company's first transaction.

In 1986, despite only having 12 employees and just two partners, Morgan Schiff was one of the 50 largest Mergers and Acquisitions firms in the world The firm continued to grow, eventually opening an office in San Francisco. Morgan Schiff suffered a major set back when one of its largest portfolio companies Friedman's Inc. declared bankruptcy after an SEC investigation found that the company's CEO and CFO lied about the liquidity of their short term customer loan program. The firm eventually closed its doors in 2004.

Art dealer Andy Valmorbida worked at the firm before establishing his gallery.

== Former Portfolio Companies/ Clients ==
- Zale Corporation
- Friedman's Inc.
- EZCorp
- Crescent Jewelers
- Farm Journal - http://agweb.com/FarmJournal/default.aspx
- AgWeb - http://agweb.com/
- Petro - http://www.petro.com/
- Tab Products-
- Hamilton Sorter - http://www.hamiltonsorter.com/
- Pietrefesa Corporation
- Telecom Corporation
- Rthport
- Cherry Tree
- Maxcell- http://www.maxcellinnerduct.com/
- Triboro
- AMC Theatres

== Unaffiliated individuals ==
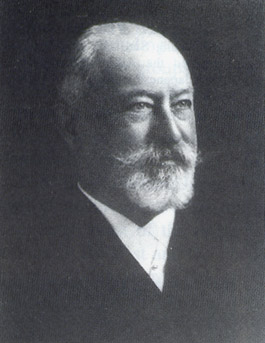
Jacob Schiff

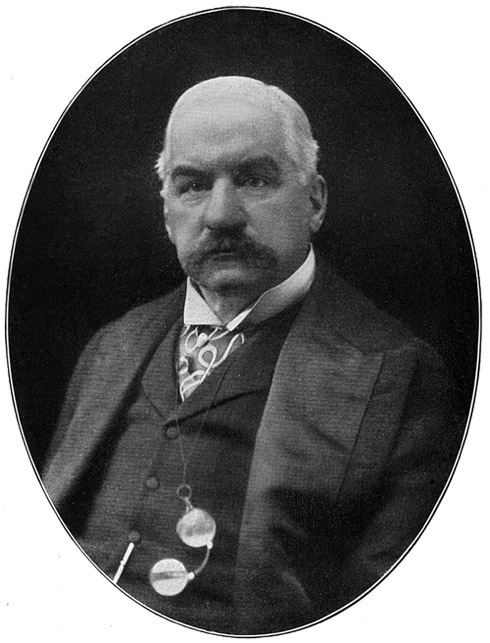
J.P. Morgan
