= You (Staxx song) =

Single by Staxx featuring Carol Leeming
- B-side: "Remix"
- Released: 1993
- Genre: Eurodisco; house; gospel
- Length: 4:05 (Man City Radio Edit); 4:04 (Overworld Radio Edit)
- Label: Free Spirit; Champion Records; Columbia Records
- Songwriters: Simon Thorne; Tom Jones; Carol Leeming
- Producers: Simon Thorne; Tom Jones

Staxx featuring Carol Leeming singles chronology
"Joy" (1993)	"You" (1993)	"Shout" (1996)

"You" is a song by British house music studio project Staxx, assembled by producers Simon Thorne and Tom Jones, and featuring British singer Carol Leeming. This was their second number one on the US Billboard Hot Dance Club Play chart (after 1994's "Joy"), reaching the top spot on July 1, 1995. The single peaked at number 50 on the UK Singles Chart. It was released by labels Free Spirit, Champion and Columbia Records.

== Critical reception ==
Larry Flick from Billboard magazine wrote that the dance act that brought "Joy" "to many a punter over a year ago is back with a peppy Euro-disco mover that soars above the current throng of NRGetic wannabes on the strength of Carol Leeming's forceful vocal. She injects sass and bounce to a simple pop hook, while also anchoring the track's frothy mélange of sugary synths and loops." Andy Beevers from Music Week's RM Dance Update said, "This belated follow-up to 'Joy' is another big and confident song backed by an impressive array of remixes that provides justification for the doublepack." He concluded, "The top of the Club Chart beckons." Another Record Mirror editor, James Hamilton, described it as a "Carol Leeming hollered happy M People-ish devotional pure gospel galloper" in his weekly dance column. Debby Peterson from The Network Forty named it a "great dance record".

== Track listing ==
- CD-single (US)
1. "You" (Man City Radio Edit) — 4:05
2. "You" (Overworld Radio Edit) — 4:04
3. "You" (Man City Vocal) — 6:43
4. "You" (Overworld Vocal) — 6:25
5. "You" (Staxx Original Mix) — 6:25
6. "You" (Sound Factory Mix) — 8:00
7. "You" (Sound Factory Edit) — 3:47

== Charts ==
=== Weekly charts ===
Chart (1995)	Peak position
Canada Dance/Urban (RPM)	13
Scotland (OCC)	59
UK Singles (OCC)	50
UK Dance (OCC)	7
UK Club Chart (Music Week)	2
UK Pop Tip Club Chart (Music Week)	33
US Hot Dance Club Play (Billboard)	1
US Maxi-Singles Sales (Billboard)	35

=== Year-end charts ===
Chart (1995)	Position
UK Club Chart (Music Week)	52
