= Blue Amazon =

Blue Amazon may refer to:

- The Brazilian Blue Amazon (Portuguese: Amazônia Azul)
- Blue Amazon (group), an English electronic music act
