= Shades of Love (band) =

Electronic dance studio act

- Also known as: Meli'sa Morgan
- Origin: New York City, United States
- Genres: Post-disco; Hi-NRG; Boogie
- Years active: 1979–1984
- Label: ScorpGemi (US)

The Shades of Love were an electronic dance studio act which included Meli'sa Morgan as lead singer. Hailing from New York City, their best known material is "Keep in Touch". The original version entered the US dance charts in 1982, where it peaked at #26. In 1995, a remix of the song was released and hit number one on the US dance charts.

== History ==
The "band" debuted with an uptempo number "Come Inside", released by Scorpgemi Records in 1979. The next singles, released by the same record label, "Do Your Own Dance" and "Come and Make Me Feel Good" helped shape their typical sound. "Come and Make Me Feel Good" and the infamous "Keep in Touch (Body to Body)" were produced, arranged and written by Lonnie Johnson and Patrick Adams.

== Chart performance ==
Year	Title	Chart positions			
Year	Title	US R&B	US Club Play	US Dance Sales	UK
1982	"Keep in Touch (Body to Body)"	52	26	—	—
1995	"Body to Body"	—	1	40	64
"—" denotes releases that did not chart.

== Discography ==
=== Partial singles ===
"Keep In Touch (Body to Body)", 1982

12" / VD-5021	1. "Keep in Touch (Body to Body)" – 5:49; 2. "Keep in Touch (Body to Body)" (instrumental) – 4:52; Label: Venture; Songwriter, producer: P. Adams, L. Johnson

=== Other singles ===
- "Come Inside" (1979, Scorpgemi Records)
- "Do Your Own Dance" (1981, Scorpgemi Records)
- "Come And Make Me Feel Good" (1982, Scorpgemi Records)
- "Come and Make Me Feel Good (Remix)" (1983, Scorpgemi Records)

== See also ==
- List of number-one dance singles of 1995 (U.S.)
