= List of UK R&B Singles Chart number ones of 1996 =

The UK R&B Chart is a weekly chart that ranks the 40 biggest-selling singles and albums that are classified in the R&B genre in the United Kingdom. The chart is compiled by the Official Charts Company, and is based on physical and other physical formats. This is a list of the UK's biggest R&B hits of 1996.

== Number ones ==
Key
| † | Best-selling R&B single of the year |

| Issue date | Single | Artist |
|---|---|---|
| 7 January | "Gangsta's Paradise" | Coolio |
| 14 January | "Too Hot" | Coolio |
| 21 January | "Anything" | 3T |
| 28 January | "Anything" | 3T |
| 4 February | "Anything" | 3T |
| 11 February | "Anything" | 3T |
| 18 February | "I Got 5 on It" | Luniz |
| 25 February | "Anything" | 3T |
| 3 March | "Good Thing" | Eternal |
| 10 March | "Return of the Mack" | Mark Morrison |
| 17 March | "Return of the Mack" | Mark Morrison |
| 24 March | "Return of the Mack" | Mark Morrison |
| 31 March | "Return of the Mack" | Mark Morrison |
| 7 April | "Return of the Mack" | Mark Morrison |
| 14 April | "Return of the Mack" | Mark Morrison |
| 21 April | "Return of the Mack" | Mark Morrison |
| 28 April | "Return of the Mack" | Mark Morrison |
| 5 May | "Return of the Mack" | Mark Morrison |
| 12 May | "Return of the Mack" | Mark Morrison |
| 19 May | "Nobody Knows" | The Tony Rich Project |
| 26 May | "Nobody Knows" | The Tony Rich Project |
| 2 June | "Killing Me Softly" † | Fugees |
| 9 June | "Killing Me Softly" † | Fugees |
| 16 June | "Killing Me Softly" † | Fugees |
| 23 June | "Killing Me Softly" † | Fugees |
| 30 June | "Killing Me Softly" † | Fugees |
| 7 July | "Killing Me Softly" † | Fugees |
| 14 July | "Killing Me Softly" † | Fugees |
| 21 July | "Killing Me Softly" † | Fugees |
| 28 July | "Killing Me Softly" † | Fugees |
| 4 August | "Tha Crossroads" | Bone Thugs-n-Harmony |
| 11 August | "If I Ruled the World (Imagine That)" | Nas featuring Lauryn Hill |
| 18 August | "Why" | 3T featuring Michael Jackson |
| 25 August | "Virtual Insanity" | Jamiroquai |
| 1 September | "Virtual Insanity" | Jamiroquai |
| 8 September | "Ready Or Not" | Fugees |
| 15 September | "Ready Or Not" | Fugees |
| 22 September | "Ready Or Not" | Fugees |
| 29 September | "Ready Or Not" | Fugees |
| 6 October | "Ready Or Not" | Fugees |
| 13 October | "Trippin'" | Mark Morrison |
| 20 October | "Trippin'" | Mark Morrison |
| 27 October | "Bohemian Rhapsody" | Braids |
| 3 November | "Angel" | Simply Red |
| 10 November | "Angel" | Simply Red |
| 17 November | "What's Love Got to Do With It" | Warren G |
| 24 November | "No Woman No Cry" | Fugees |
| 1 December | "Cosmic Girl" | Jamiroquai |
| 8 December | "Forever" | Damage |
| 15 December | "Horny" | Mark Morrison |
| 22 December | "Horny" | Mark Morrison |
| 29 December | "Horny" | Mark Morrison |

== See also ==
- List of UK Dance Singles Chart number ones of 1996
- List of UK Independent Singles Chart number ones of 1996
- List of UK Rock & Metal Singles Chart number ones of 1996
- List of UK R&B Albums Chart number ones of 1996
