= Bedrock (duo) =

British electronic music duo

- Also known as: John Digweed & Nick Muir
- Origin: London, England
- Genres: Trance; house; techno
- Years active: 1992–present
- Labels: Bedrock Records; Stress Records
- Members: John Digweed; Nick Muir
- Website: bedrock.org.uk

Bedrock (also known as John Digweed & Nick Muir) are a British electronic dance music duo comprising John Digweed and Nick Muir.

== Biography ==
They produced the singles "For What You Dream Of" (1993, featured in Trainspotting), "Set in Stone" / "Forbidden Zone" (1997), "Heaven Scent" (1999) (featured in the film Groove) and "Voices" (2000), all of which reached the UK Singles Chart. More recently they released the Beautiful Strange EP in 2001, "Emerald" in 2002, "Forge" in 2003 and "Santiago" in 2005.

They have also remixed the work of artists such as Humate, New Order, Way Out West, Evolution, Satoshi Tomiie, The Orb and Underworld. In 1999, the duo founded Bedrock Records. In 2003, they composed the soundtrack of the MTV cartoon drama Spider-Man, a miscellaneous program tied into the 2002 blockbuster film as a promotion.

The song "Beautiful Strange" featured in the 2004 film What the Bleep Do We Know!?.

== Discography ==
=== Studio albums ===
Title	Album details	Charts
Title	Album details	UK Dance
Versus (as John Digweed & Nick Muir)	Released: 7 October 2013; Label: Bedrock Records; Formats: CD, digital download, vinyl	40
"—" denotes a recording that did not chart or was not released in that territory.

=== Extended plays ===
Title	Album details
Beautiful Strange	Released: 2001; Label: Bedrock Records; Formats: CD, vinyl

=== Singles ===
Title	Year	Peak chart positions		Album
Title	Year	UK	UK Dance	Album
"For What You Dream Of" (featuring KYO)	1993	25	1	Trainspotting: Music from the Motion Picture
"Set in Stone" / "Forbidden Zone"	1997	71	6	Non-album singles
"Heaven Scent" / "Lifeline"	1999	35	2	Non-album singles
"Voices"	2000	44	1	Non-album singles
"Emerald"	2002	77	6	Non-album singles
"Forge"	2003	—	11	Beautiful Strange
"Santiago"	2005	—	13	Non-album single
"—" denotes a recording that did not chart or was not released in that territory.

As John Digweed & Nick Muir

Title	Year	Album
"Aquatonic"	2009	Non-album singles
"Tangent"	2009	Non-album singles
"Satellite Meteor"	2010	Non-album singles
"30 Northeast"	2011	Non-album singles
"Awakenings" (vs Psycatron)	2013	Versus
"3B3" (featuring John Twelve Hawks)	2014	Non-album singles
"Fanfare" (with Darren Emerson)	2016	Non-album singles
"Tracer" (with Darren Emerson)	2017	Non-album singles
"Tachyon Dream" (vs Gabriel Ananda)	2017	Non-album singles
"Close Your Eyes" (with Luke Brancaccio and Simon Berry)	2018	Non-album singles
"Crazy Diamond" (with Eagles & Butterflies)	2018	Non-album singles
