= Ritz Ballroom =

Ritz Ballroom may refer to:

- Ritz Ballroom, Bridgeport, Connecticut, USA
- Ritz Ballroom, Kings Heath, Birmingham, England
