= CeX (retailer) =

British second-hand goods chain

C.E.X. Limited
- Trade name: CeX
- Formerly: Calibre Analysis Limited (May–August 1996)
- Type: Private
- Industry: Retail
- Founded: 1992; 34 years ago in Tottenham Court Road, London, United Kingdom
- Founders: Robert Dudani; Paul Farrington; Hugh Man; Charlie Brooker; Oli Smith; Oliver Ball
- Headquarters: Watford, Hertfordshire, United Kingdom
- Number of locations: 619 (2025)
- Area served: Australia; Canary Islands; India; Ireland; Italy; Malaysia; Mexico; Poland; Portugal; Spain; United Kingdom; Netherlands (formerly); United States (formerly)
- Key people: David Mullins (Chairman); David Butler (Managing Director)
- Products: Electronics; Mobile Phones; Computers; Tablets; Video games; Music; DVDs; Blu-rays; Ultra HD Blu-rays
- Revenue: ▲£178.70 million (2023)
- Operating income: ▲£5.48 million (2023)
- Net income: ▲£4.15 million (2023)
- Total assets: ▲£15.23 million (2023)
- Number of employees: ▲2,633 (Note: This only includes employees directly employed and not those employed by franchise stores) (2023)
- Website: webuy.com

C.E.X. Limited, trading as CeX (/sɛks/), is a British retailer predominantly dealing in pre-owned video games, mobile phones, computers, DVDs, Blu-rays and consumer electronics, established in 1992 in London as the Computer Exchange. The retailer later renamed itself as the Complete Entertainment Exchange. As of September 2026, there are 380 stores in the UK, and a further 271 internationally, with a number of its locations being franchises.

== History ==
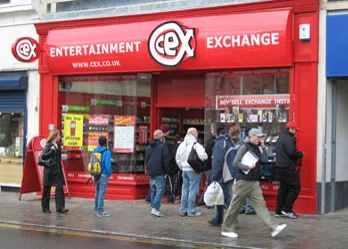
A CeX store in Brighton, Sussex

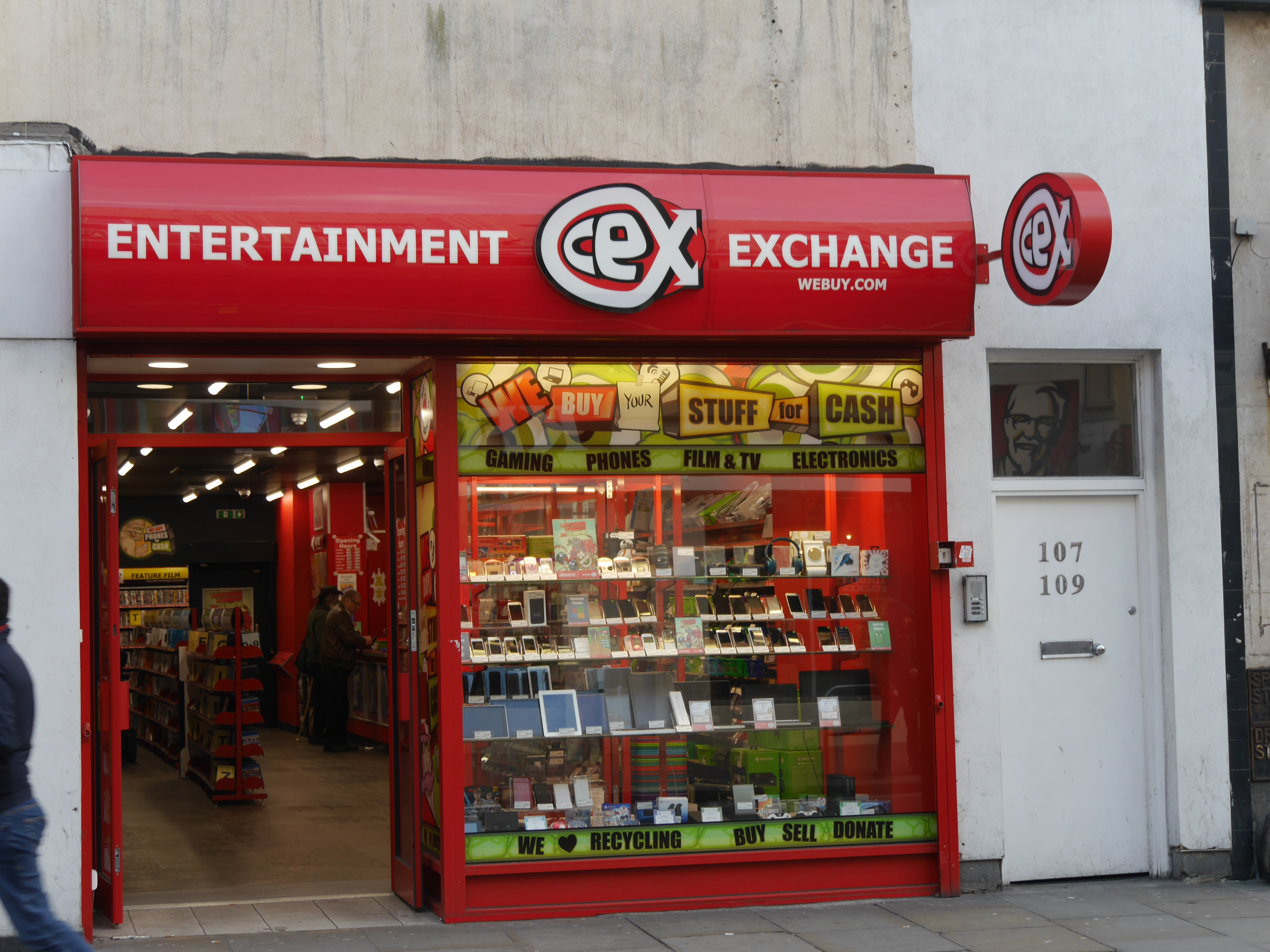
CeX, King Street, Hammersmith, London

CeX was started by Paul Farrington, Robert Dudani, Hugh Man, Charlie Brooker, Oli Smith and Oliver Ball. The first shop opened on London's Whitfield Street, close to Tottenham Court Road in 1992. As a second hand retailer, CeX trades with customers offering either cash or a voucher for redemption in any CeX shop. CeX offer a 5 year warranty subject to terms on all of the second hand products the company sells.

The "CeX" name moved away from "Computer eXchange" into an acronym for "Complete Entertainment eXchange", and company letterheads state "CeX LTD is trading as CeX Entertainment Exchange". In 2005, CeX began issuing licences for franchising.

Dudani appeared on the British Channel 4 TV show The Secret Millionaire. This was after the business was affected by the 2011 England riots.

In December 2013, CeX began Designer Exchange buying luxury leather goods, jewellery and handbags, with stores in Kensington, Chelsea, Knightsbridge, Manchester, Birmingham, Leeds and Madrid.

The pronunciation of the chain's acronym name is officially confirmed as sex, which is used in British commercials aired in February 2017.

In November 2017, CeX launched a technology repair service called Tech Centre (formerly called CeX Clinic) in the UK. The service covers the repair of video game consoles. Tech Center offers a 2-year warranty on device repairs and a no fix, no fee promise to customers.

In March 2025, a delivery service using the JustEat app was introduced.

On 5 June 2025, it was announced that CeX was closing all of its physical stores in the Netherlands while keeping the online store there open, however, on 25 September 2025, it was announced that the online store will also be closing on 9 November 2025 and that it is no longer possible to sell products.

The CeX logo was designed by Charlie Brooker. He also drew the cartoons used in early advertisements for the company.

== Locations ==
Country	Shops
United Kingdom	391
United States (formerly)	4
Spain (mainland)	62
Republic of Ireland	36
Mexico	22
Australia	40
Portugal	32
India	14
Poland	11
Canary Islands (Spain)	3
Malaysia	10
Italy	7

== See also ==
- Game (retailer)
- Cash Converters – Australian pawnbroker
- Cash Generator – United Kingdom–based retailer
