= Friedman's Inc. =

Friedman's, Inc.
- Company type: Private (Public prior to 2005)
- Industry: Retail
- Founded: 1920
- Fate: Bankruptcy
- Headquarters: Savannah, Georgia
- Key people: Bradley Stinn CEO; Victor Suglia CFO; Morgan Schiff & Co.- Phillip Ean Cohen; Sterling Brinkley
- Products: Jewelry

Friedman's Inc. was an American company that owned and operated fine jewelry specialty stores under the names Friedman's Jewelers and Crescent Jewelers. It declared bankruptcy in 2008 and had shuttered all stores by June 2008.

== History ==
The company was established in Savannah, Georgia in 1920. Friedman's Inc. was headquartered in Addison, Texas. They were the third largest jewelry company in the US. Friedman's stressed value and low prices, owning the trademark "The Value Leader" and advertising "Unbeatable Values". Unlike many chain jewelers, Friedman's had many of its locations in power centers and strip malls, besides enclosed malls and outlet centers. The company had stated that they preferred locations anchored by a discounter "big box" store, almost always Wal-Mart. This fits with their core demographic of lower to middle income customers between 18 and 40.

In 2005, Friedman's filed for Chapter 11 bankruptcy protection, and due to a second bankruptcy filing in early 2008, Friedman's and Crescent liquidated all of their stores save for a small number of locations purchased by Whitehall Jewelers Inc. for approximately 14 million dollars. Whitehall went bankrupt shortly after the purchase and began liquidating all of its stores in August 2008.

In 2009, Windsor Fine Jewelers, LLC based in Augusta, GA, purchased the trademark "Friedman's Jewelers" and opened a location in Augusta, GA. In 2017, they launched the www.friedmans.com e-commerce platform.
