= EZCorp =

American pawn shop operator

EZCORP, Inc.
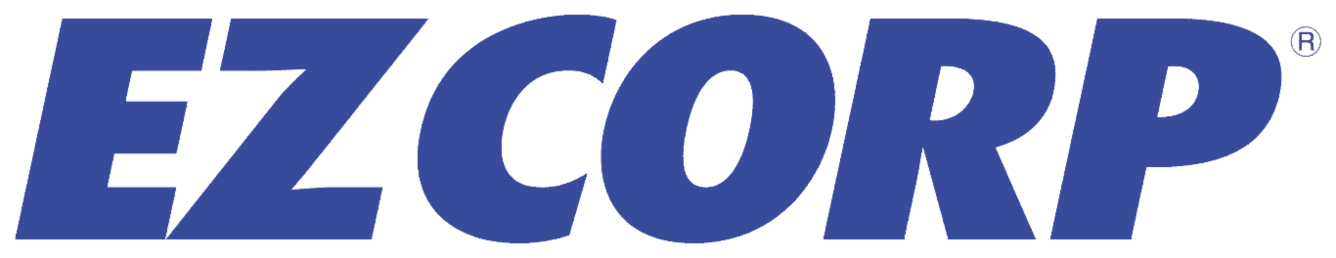
- Type: Public
- Traded as: Nasdaq: EZPW (Class A, non-voting); S&P 600 component
- Industry: Specialty Consumer Financing
- Founded: 1989; 37 years ago
- Founder: Courtland L. Logue, Jr.
- Headquarters: Austin, Texas, US
- Area served: USA, Mexico, Guatemala, El Salvador, Honduras
- Key people: Jason Kulas (CEO); Philip E. Cohen (executive chairman); Timothy K. Jugmans (CFO); Lachlan P. Given (chief strategy, M&A and Funding officer); Francisco J. Kuthy Saenger (president, Latin America Pawn)
- Products: Pawn, Retail
- Brands: EZPAWN, Empeño Fácil, Cash Converters and GuatePrenda.
- Revenue: ▲US$ 822.81 million (2020)
- Number of employees: 6,500
- Website: ezcorp.com

EZCORP, Inc. is an American pawn shop operator based in Austin, Texas which provides services across the United States and Latin America. It is a publicly traded company listed on the NASDAQ stock exchange and is the second largest pawn shop operator in the U.S. after Cash America International.

As of September 30, 2021, the company operated 1,148 stores, 516 in the U.S (with 44% located in Texas, 18% in Florida and the remainder spread across 18 other states), 508 locations in Mexico, 90 in Guatemala, 18 in El Salvador and 16 in Honduras.

The company has a dual share structure and Phillip E. Cohen owns 100% of the Class B Voting Common Stock through his ownership of the MS Pawn Corporation, the A class of shares does not have voting power. Cohen serves as Executive Chairman of EZCorp.

As of October 2021, the Company owns 37.72% of Cash Converters International, which franchises and operates a worldwide network of over 750 stores that provide personal financial services and sell pre-owned merchandise. Cash Converters is listed on the Australian Stock Exchange (ASX) under the ticker "CCV".

EZCORP owns approximately 13% of Rich Data Corporation (“RDC”), a Singapore-based firm that creates software to assess credit risk of individuals.

== History ==
The company was founded in 1989. In 1994, the company had grown to operate 234 pawn shops in nine states. The company expanded its business to offer payday loan services in its EZPAWN locations in 2001. The first stand-alone payday loan stores were opened and branded EZMONEY in 2003. EZCORP then entered into international markets. EZPAWN opened 4 new stores along the Texas/Mexico border and acquired 20 stores in the interior of Mexico, which were branded Empeño Fácil in 2007. In late 2008 EZCORP purchased the Las Vegas based loan providers, Pawn Plus and ASAP Pawn. In 2009, EZCORP expanded to Canada, operating under the name CashMax.

The company also acquired 30% interest in Cash Converters International in November 2009. The company reports it acquired Value Financial Services in January 2009. In 2010, EZCORP increased interest in Cash Converters International to 33%. The company was also listed on Fortune Magazine's 100 Fastest Growing Companies for 2010. EZCORP acquired the Cash Converters master franchise rights in Canada in 2011. In 2012, EZCORP acquired a controlling interest in Grupo Finmart, a specialty consumer finance company headquartered in Mexico City and operating under the name "Crediamigo"; and TUYO, a company headquartered in Mexico City that owns and operates buy/sell stores in Mexico City and the surrounding metropolitan area.

In 2015, EZCORP acquired USA Pawn & Jewelry, which operated in Arizona and Oregon.

As per the company's website, effective July 29, 2015, EZCORP, Inc. announced the closure of its U.S. Financial Services business which offered payday loans, auto title loans, installment loans and lines of credit. All stores are now closed.

== Description ==
EZCORP, Inc. provides pawn loans in the United States and Latin America. The company also sells merchandise, primarily collateral forfeited from pawn lending operations and pre-owned merchandise purchased from customers. It offers pawn loans, which are nonrecourse loans collateralized by tangible personal property, including jewelry, consumer electronics, tools, sporting goods, and musical instruments. In addition, the company offers Lana, a web-based engagement platform to manage pawn loans.
