= Ritz Ballroom, Kings Heath =

Ritz Ballroom
- The Ritz
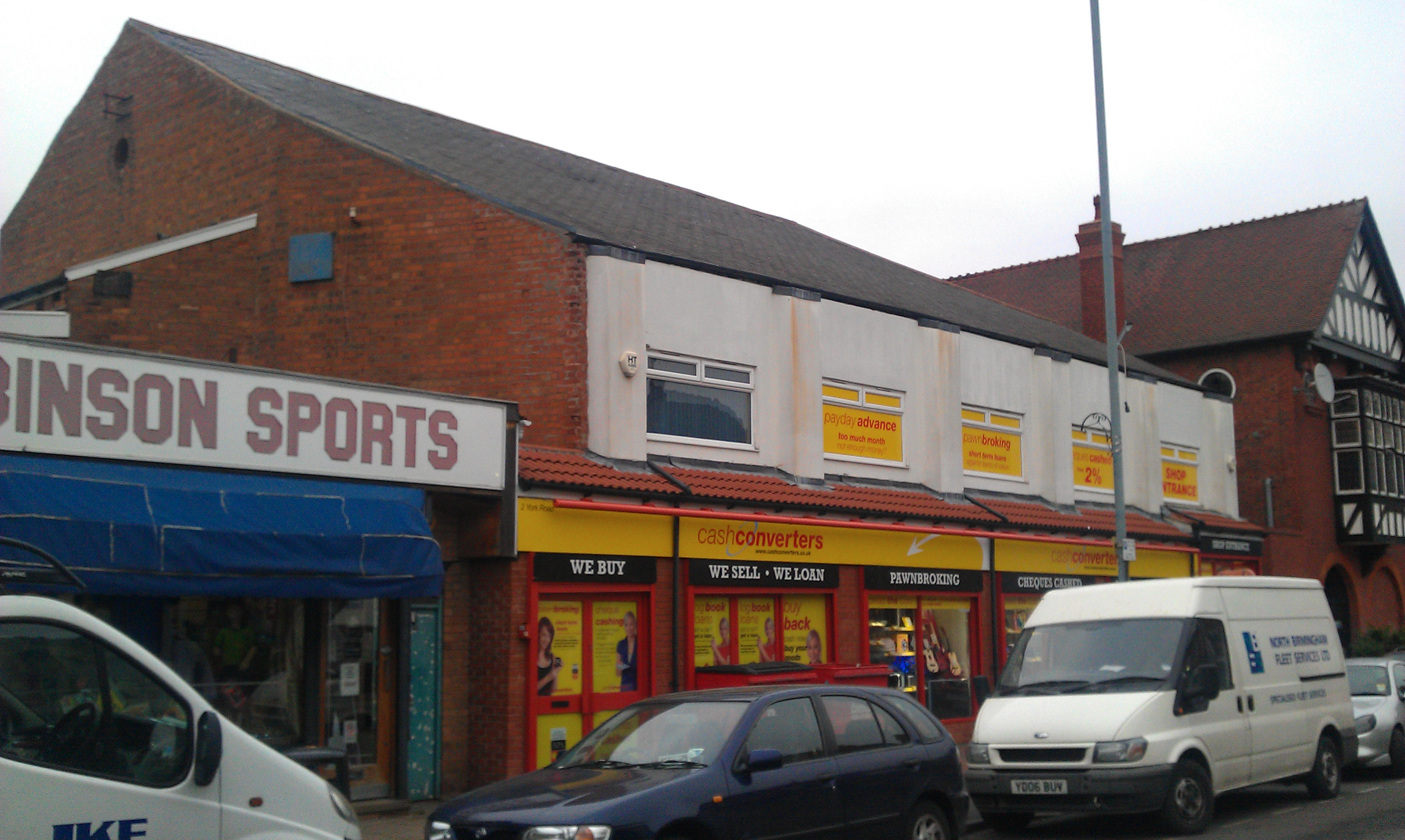
- The building in February 2012
- Interactive map of Ritz Ballroom
- Location: York Road, Kings Heath, Birmingham, England, United Kingdom
- Coordinates: 52.43463°N 1.89355°W
- Owner: Joe and Mary Regan

Construction
- Demolished: 27 March 2013 (by fire)

The Ritz Ballroom in York Road, Kings Heath, Birmingham, West Midlands, was a 1960s music venue, known for the number of artists it hosted, who went on to become international successes, especially those on the roster of Brian Epstein.

Operated by Joe Regan and his wife Mary, the venue used a former cinema. Acts which appeared there included The Beatles, Pink Floyd and The Rolling Stones.

In March 2013, the building, by then used as shop, was destroyed by fire.

== The Regans ==
The Regans - known as "Ma and Pa Regan" - operated three other concert venues in the area:

- The Plaza, Handsworth, Birmingham
- The Plaza, Old Hill
- The Gary Owen (also known as the Kavern), Small Heath

Mary was responsible for selecting and booking the acts. She was also a PE teacher at Coleshill. At the time of Joe's death, in 2004, aged 92, the couple had two children, six grandchildren, and three great-grandchildren.

== Building history ==
Originally opened as the Ideal Cinema, the building then became a snooker hall, before reopening as The Ritz Ballroom. Some time in the late 1960s or 1970s, the Regans converted the premises into a bingo hall, after which it was derelict for some years. Its final use was as a Cash Converters shop.

In the early hours of 27 March 2013, the building was destroyed by fire, caused by an electrical fault. The remaining walls were demolished in January 2015.

== Notable performances ==
- 15 February 1963: The Beatles (shortly after releasing "Please Please Me")
- 21 June 1963: Jerry Lee Lewis / Gene Vincent
- 14 September 1963: The Rolling Stones
- 26 February 1965: The Moody Blues
- 24 April 1966: Robert Plant
- 11 June 1966: The Kinks
- 16 December 1967: Pink Floyd
