= Joy (Staxx song) =

Single by Staxx featuring Carol Leeming
- B-side: "Remix"
- Released: 1993
- Genre: Eurodance; house
- Length: 3:22 (original edit); 3:37 (Love Joy Serious vocal edit); 3:49 (Mondo's Pussycat radio edit)
- Label: Champion; Free Spirit
- Songwriters: Simon Thorne; Tom Jones
- Producers: Simon Thorne; Tom Jones

Staxx featuring Carol Leeming singles chronology
"Joy" (1993)	"You" (1995)

Music video
- "Joy" on YouTube

"Joy" is the debut single by British house music studio project Staxx, assembled by producers Simon Thorne and Tom Jones. It was released in 1993 by Champion Records and Free Spiritand, and features British singer Carol Leeming, becoming a number-one hit on both the US Billboard Hot Dance Club Play chart and the Canadian RPM Dance/Urban chart. On the UK Singles Chart, it peaked at number 25. In 1997, the song was re-released in a new remix, reaching number 14 in the UK. The accompanying music video was directed by British director Lindy Heymann, featuring Leeming and two female dancers performing in an empty swimming pool. MTV Europe put the video on "break out" rotation in December 1993.

== Chart performance ==
"Joy" was a club staple and a notable hit on the charts in several countries, peaking at number-one on both the US Billboard Hot Dance Club Play chart in February 1994 and the Canadian RPM Dance/Urban chart in May 1994. In Europe, it was a top-20 hit in Denmark (20), and a top-30 hit in Switzerland (30), and the UK. In the latter, it peaked at number 25 in its third week at the UK Singles Chart, on October 10, 1993. On the Music Week Dance Singles chart, it hit number two, behind Frankie Goes to Hollywood's "Relax". In the Netherlands, "Joy" was a top-40 hit, reaching number 33. On the Eurochart Hot 100, it reached its highest position as number 70, after debuting at number 97 on 23 October 1993, when the single charted in the UK. Later, in February 1994, "Joy" peaked at number six on the European Dance Radio Chart. Elsewhere, the song was a top-20 hit in Israel (14) and a top-90 hit in Australia, reaching number 90 on the ARIA singles chart.

In 1997, "Joy" was released in a new remix, this time peaking at number 14 on the UK Singles Chart, number five on the UK Dance Singles Chart and number two on the Record Mirror Club Chart.

== Critical reception ==
Larry Flick from Billboard magazine wrote, "This smokin' anthem is cast in a mold similar to Culture Beat's 'Mr. Vain', wrapping a brain-embedding hook around a rapid, percolating beatbase. [...] Icing on the cake is Carol Leeming's spirited vocal appearance on several mixes." In the magazine's single review, he also noted that it "has a roaring and frenetic rave-ish undercurrent", complimenting the singer as "a charming presence, playfully wrapping her feline voice around the song's ear-catching chorus and refrain." Maria Jimenez from Music & Media remarked that the track "is spreading like musical wildfire." James Hamilton from Music Week's RM Dance Update described it as a "typically excellent Carol Leeming wailed and scatted catchy soul-funk-gospel-garage-house with so many "joy"-ful influences that it's instantly familiar". Wendi Cermak from The Network Forty named it a "delectable dance tune to liven up your current library of down-tempo jams and ballads." David Petrilla from The Weekender concluded that "this song deserves all the attention it will get. It's upbeat, happy, well produced and performed. 'Joy' has what it takes to enjoy a long stay in most DJs play stacks. I wouldn't be surprised if it even crosses over to radio, but remember you heard it first on the dance floor!"

On the 1997 remix, Flick from Billboard named it a "cute Euro-NRG ditty" and a "wonderfully bright and anthemic jam". He added, "Leeming has a sassy vocal style to offset the oh-so-happy music. She knocks off a few festive vamps and refrains that should stick to the brains of programmers within seconds." Chris Finan from the RM Dance Update gave it a score of four out of five, writing, "Far and away a cracking record in its own right, Champion relives the moment with some deft reworkings by Grand Larceny and Monde. The best way to update this would have been to stick closely to all the hooks that made it the first time and that's exactly what's been done. Mondo just updates the tune, retaining the complete Carol Leeming vocal and using similar synth hooks over the top. An old favourite that will probably become a new favourite."

== Track listing ==
- 12", UK (1993)

A. "Joy" (Love Joy Vocal Mix)
B1. "Joy" (Original Mix)
B2. "Joy" (Love Joy Stringapella)

- 12" (Diss-Cuss Remix), Italy (1993)

A1. "Joy" (Diss-Cuss Vox Remix) – 6:40
A2. "Joy" (Joy Radio Edit) – 3:38
B1. "Joy" (Original Mix) – 5:52
B2. "Joy" (Love Joy 12" Vocal Mix) – 6:20

- CD single, UK (1993)
1. "Joy" (Love Joy Serious Vocal Edit) – 3:37
2. "Joy" (Original Edit) – 3:21
3. "Joy" (Love Joy Vocal Mix) – 6:24
4. "Joy" (Original Mix) – 6:37
5. "Joy" (Diss-Cuss Vox Mix) – 6:40
6. "Joy" (Stones Club Mix) – 4:55
7. "Joy" (Love Joy Dub) – 6:53
- CD maxi, Germany (1993)
1. "Joy" (Love Joy Serious Vocal Edit) – 3:40
2. "Joy" (Original Radio Edit) – 3:22
3. "Joy" (Love Joy Serious Vocal Mix) – 6:25
4. "Joy" (Stones Club Mix) – 4:53
- 12", UK (1997)

A. "Joy" (Mondo's Pussycat Vocal)
B1. "Joy" (Lovejoy Vocal 12")
B2. "Joy" (Grand Larceny Mix)

- CD single, UK (1997)
1. "Joy" (Mondo's Pussycat Radio Edit) – 3:49
2. "Joy" (Lovejoy Vocal Edit) – 3:38
3. "Joy" (Mondo's Pussycat Vocal 12") – 7:34
4. "Joy" (Lovejoy Vocal 12") – 6:25
5. "Joy" (Mondo's Topless Vocal 12") – 6:58
6. "Joy" (Grand Larceny Mix) – 8:23

== Charts ==
=== Weekly charts ===
Chart (1993–1994)	Peak position
Australia (ARIA)	90
Canada Dance/Urban (RPM)	1
Denmark (IFPI)	20
Europe (Eurochart Hot 100)	70
Europe (European Dance Radio)	6
Israel (Israeli Singles Chart)	14
Netherlands (Dutch Top 40 Tipparade)	17
Netherlands (Single Top 100)	33
Switzerland (Schweizer Hitparade)	30
UK Singles (OCC)	25
UK Airplay (Music Week)	17
UK Dance (Music Week)	2
UK Club Chart (Music Week)	2
US Dance Singles Sales (Billboard)	13
US Hot Dance Club Play (Billboard)	1

Chart (1997)	Peak position
Australia (ARIA)	58
Europe (Eurochart Hot 100)	73
Scotland (OCC)	10
UK Singles (OCC)	14
UK Dance (OCC)	5
UK Club Chart (Music Week)	2

=== Year-end charts ===
Chart (1993)	Position
UK Club Chart (Music Week)	38

Chart (1994)	Position
Canada Dance/Urban (RPM)	6
US Hot Dance Club Play (Billboard)	23

Chart (1997)	Position
UK Club Chart (Music Week)	54

== See also ==
- List of number-one dance hits (United States)
- List of artists who reached number one on the U.S. Dance Club Songs chart
