= Record sales =

Economic activity related to selling music recordings

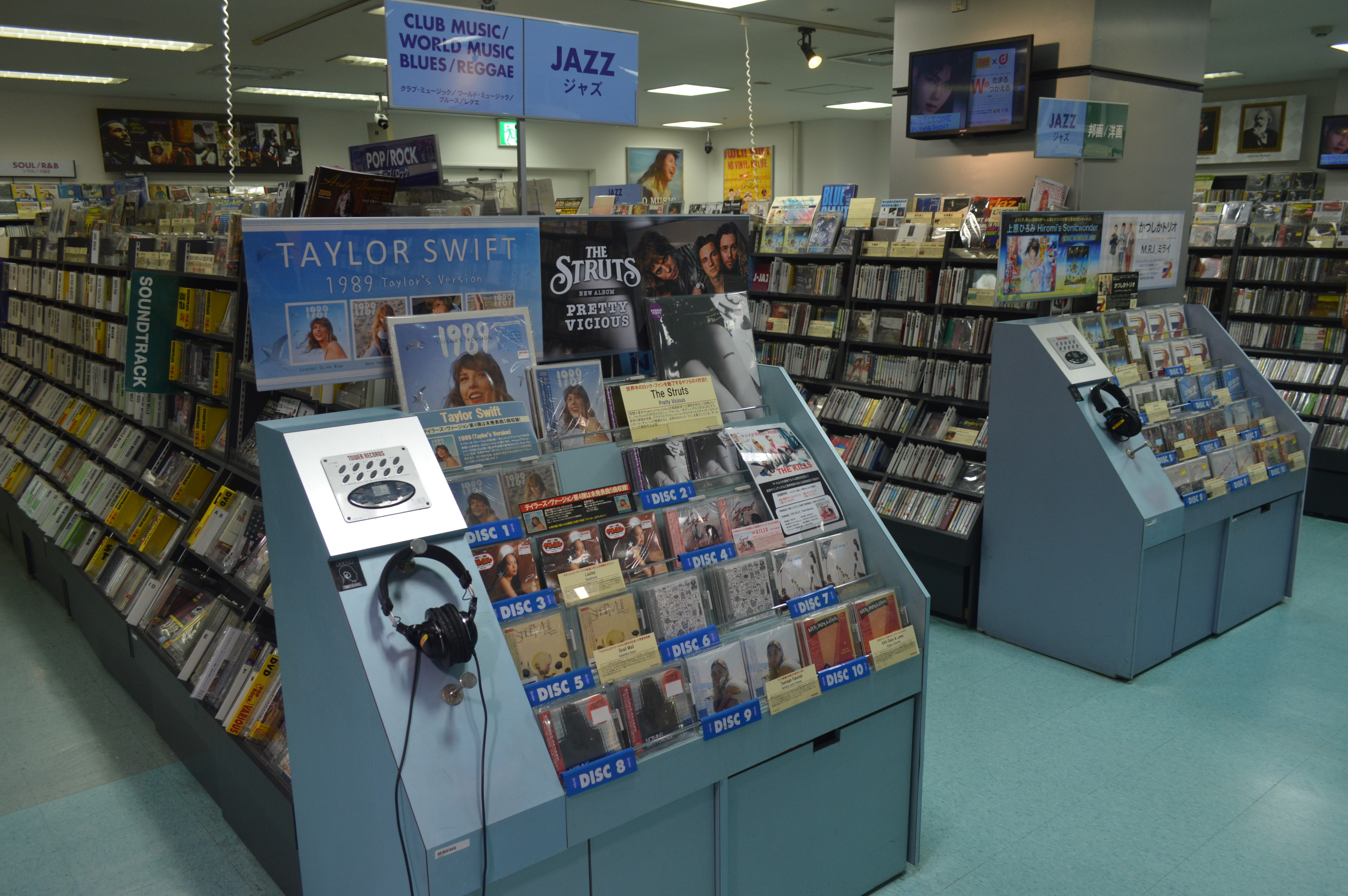
A Tower Records store in Nagoya, Japan, November 2023.

Record sales or music sales are activities related to selling music recordings (albums, singles, or music videos) through physical record shops or digital music stores. Record sales reached their peak in 1999, when 600 million people spent an average of $64 on records, achieving $40 billion in sales of recorded music.

Record sales started declining in the 21st century, which made artists rely on touring for most of their income. By 2019, record sales accounted for less than half of global recorded music revenue, overtaken by streaming. Following the inclusion of streaming into record charts in the mid-2010s, record sales are also referred to as traditional sales or pure sales.

Although an accurate worldwide sales figure is hard to determine, it is widely acknowledged that the Beatles have sold more records than any other artist in history. Michael Jackson's studio album Thriller (1982) remains the best-selling album in history, while "White Christmas" (1942) performed by Bing Crosby is believed to be the best-selling single.

== History ==
=== 1870s–2000s: Physical era ===
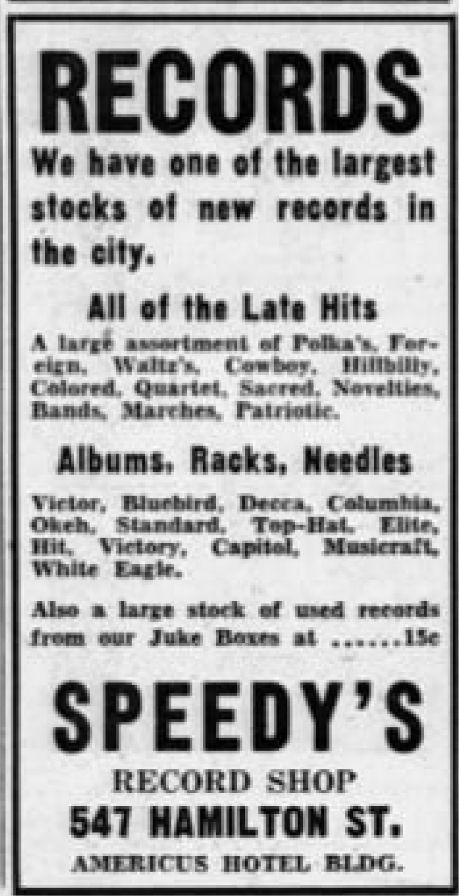
A record shop advertisement from 1943

Before the existence of recording medium and its player, the music industry earned profit through selling musical compositions on sheet music. The very first sales chart published by Billboard magazine in the United States was the Sheet Music Best Sellers chart. Following the invention of the phonograph, by Thomas Edison in 1877, the music industry began hiring singers to record songs made by composers. Due to the length limit of recording media, singles were the only available commercial releases. In 1900, the US record sales is estimated at 3 million copies. The music industry continued its growth, and by 1921 the value of record sales in the US reached $106 million with 140 million records being sold.

Album sales were first reported by Billboard magazine on March 24, 1945. An album was then defined as a box containing a set of singles, such as Glenn Miller by Glenn Miller, as well as Selections from Going My Way and Merry Christmas by Bing Crosby. Technological developments in the early 20th century led to the development of the vinyl LP record as an important medium for recorded music. In 1948, Columbia Records began to bring out 33 1/3 rpm twelve-inch extended-play LPs that could play for as long as 52 minutes, or 26 minutes per side. Musical film soundtracks, jazz works, and thematic albums by singers such as Frank Sinatra quickly utilized the new longer format. Billboard launched its first regularly published weekly albums chart, Best Selling Popular Albums, on March 24, 1956.

During the 1950s and into the 1960s, 45 rpm seven-inch single sales were considered the primary market for the recording industry, while albums were a secondary market. The careers of notable rock and roll performers such as Elvis Presley were driven primarily by single sales. Album sales reached its peak in English-language popular music from the mid-1960s to the mid-2000s (known as "album era") in which the album was the dominant form of recorded music expression and consumption. From the early 1980s, the CD became the dominant format for both albums and singles, due to factors such as higher audio quality, durability, ease of use, and longer playing time. In 1986, Dire Straits' Brothers in Arms became the first album in history to sell over one million copies on CD.

=== 2000s–present: Digital era ===
In October 2005, "Hollaback Girl" by Gwen Stefani was the first single ever to sell one million digital downloads. Downloads have been in decline since 2013 as consumers have moved away from a purchase/ownership model towards a subscription-based model (streaming). By 2018, total sales were at their lowest point since the 1970s, and continue to fall. In 2020, major UK retailers such as supermarkets started to stop selling music.

== Marketing ==
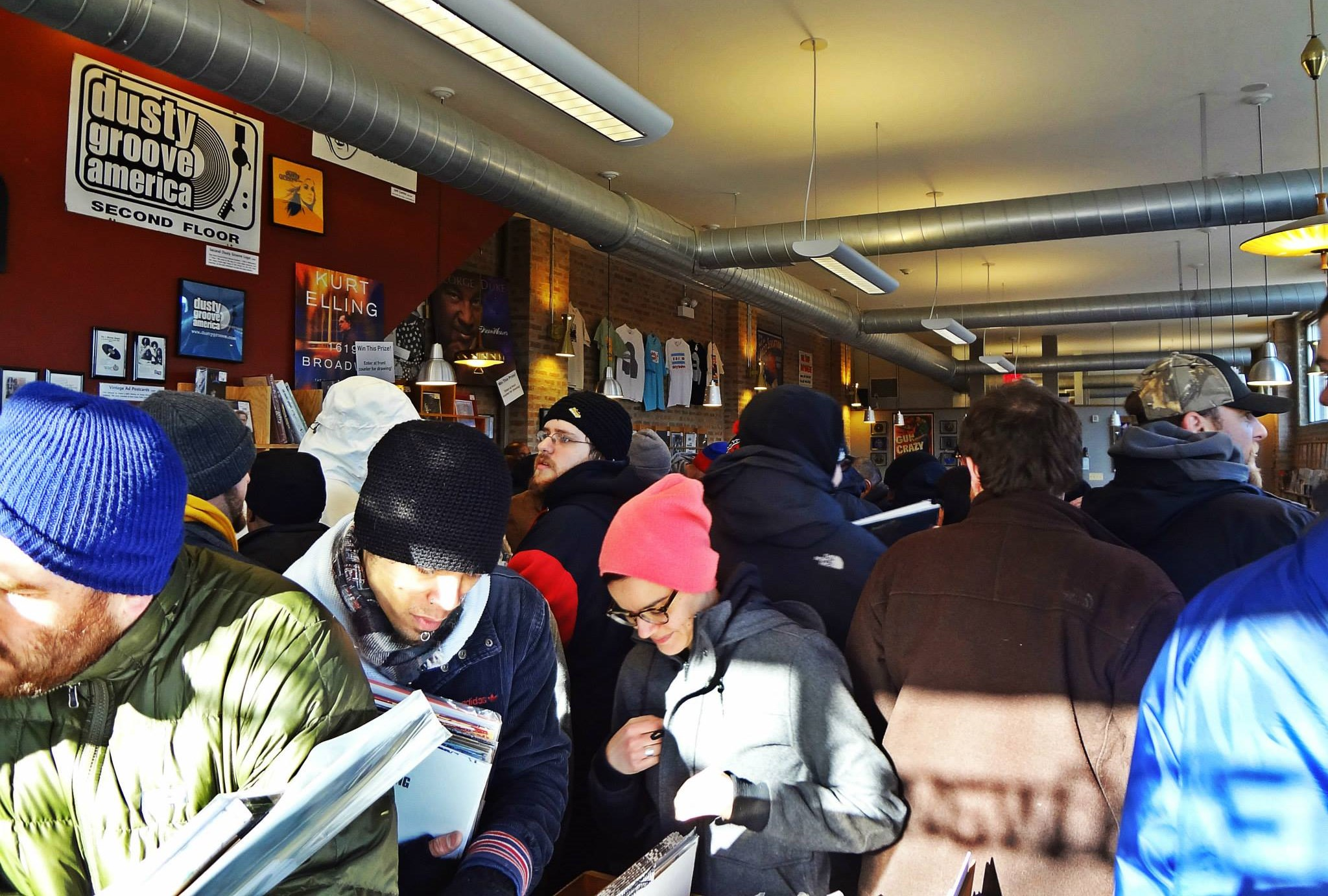
A crowd buying records in the Dusty Groove store during the Record Store Day, April 2014.

Aside of paid advertising in print or broadcast media, radio airplay is one of the most important tools to sell records. A research commissioned by one of major label groups stated that "four out of five music purchases can be traced to radio airplay.

In 2007, Record Store Day was inaugurated to bring together fans, artists, and thousands of independent record stores across the world. The 2013 event of Record Store Day was credited with the highest U.S. vinyl sales, and the 2014 edition resulted in independent retailers recording the highest percentage of physical album sales, since the SoundScan system was introduced in 1991.

=== Merchandise bundles ===
In 2004, Prince became the first major artist to bundle an album with the purchase of a ticket to a concert. A copy of Musicology was given to each audience member who entered the concert venue, and each was counted as an album sale on the week's Billboard 200 chart. This led Billboard and Nielsen SoundScan to change their policy on how tickets bundled with albums would count for charting purposes.

Travis Scott bundled his 2018 album Astroworld with his 28-piece merchandise line, which contributed to first-week sales exceeding 270,000 traditional units and a number-one debut on the Billboard 200.

RIAA summary by format, in million copies per year.

- Vinyl
- Cassette
- CD
- Download
- Others

== Financial loss ==
At times, labels overshipped records to retailers with too high expectations of commercial response. Records not sold to consumers may be returned to the label. In January 2008, media reported that over one million unsold copies of Robbie Williams's album Rudebox were sent to China to be crushed. EMI owner Guy Hands said, "Roughly 85% of what EMI does get to release never makes a profit, in part because of the cash spent signing bands and partly due to ill-made bets on the number of CDs the market requires for particular acts."

In 2011, Amazon sold an estimated 440,000 digital copies of Lady Gaga's Born This Way in its first two days at a price of 99 cents. This promotional campaign caused a loss of over $3 million for the company. In 2014, U2's album Songs of Innocence was released for free on iTunes. Apple's deal with U2 and the band's label, Universal Music, which stands to lose more than a million full-price sales because of the free download offer, guarantees $100 million worth of high-profile marketing for the album.

== Second-hand ==
The sale of second-hand albums and singles continues into the 2020s, with many record stores having a used section, as well as pawn shops such as CeX, Cash Generator, Cash Converters, and the emergence of eBay, MusicMagpie, Alibris and other dedicated websites.

== See also ==
- List of largest recorded music markets
- Record label
- Record collecting
  - List of most valuable records
- Music recording certification
  - List of music recording certifications
- List of best-selling music artists
- List of best-selling albums
  - List of best-selling albums by country
- List of best-selling singles
  - List of best-selling singles by country
  - List of best-selling sheet music
- List of most expensive albums
- Album-equivalent unit
- Vinyl revival
