= Staxx of Joy =

British musical group

Staxx of Joy were a British house music studio project assembled by producers Simon Thorne and Tom Jones. In the mid-1990s, they had four top 10 hits on the US Billboard Hot Dance Music/Club Play chart, two of which reached number one: "Joy" and "You". Both of these tracks, and a third single, "Shout", featured vocals by Carol Leeming. The songs are officially credited to Staxx of Joy featuring Carol Leeming.

A fourth top 10 dance hit, "Temptation", was credited to Staxx.

== Discography ==
List of singles, with selected chart positions
Title	Year	Peak chart positions					Album
Title	Year	UK	AUS	NED	SWI	US Dance	Album
"Joy"	1993	25	90	33	30	1	Non-album singles
"You"	1995	50	—	—	—	1	Non-album singles
"Shout"	1996	125	—	—	—	8	Non-album singles
"Joy '97"	1997	14	58	—	—	—	Non-album singles
"Temptation"	1998	84	—	—	—	3	Non-album singles
"—" denotes releases that did not chart or were not released.

== See also ==
- List of number-one dance hits (United States)
- List of artists who reached number one on the US Dance chart
