= Meechie =

American singer

Meechie is a female African American dance music singer from Chicago. She placed two songs on the US Billboard Hot Dance Music/Club Play chart in the 1990s, "Bring Me Joy" and "You'll Never Find." "Bring Me Joy" spent one week at #74 in the UK Singles Chart in September 1995.

== See also ==
- List of number-one dance hits (United States)
- List of artists who reached number one on the US Dance chart
