= Nick Muir =

British musician and music producer

- Genres: Electronic music; progressive house
- Years active: 1992–present
- Label: Bedrock Records
- Website: nickmuirmusic.co.uk

Nick Muir is a British musician, songwriter and electronic music producer. He is best known as one half of the electronic music duo Bedrock, which consists of himself and DJ John Digweed, although he also found success as a solo artist.

== Career ==
His career can be roughly divided into two parts. During the 1980s, he was a session musician, playing piano/keyboards with various artists including Take That, Fire Next Time and The Men They Couldn't Hang. He also worked in France with rock and roll singer Johnny Hallyday and crooner Herbert Leonard. During his time with punk-folk outfit The Men They Couldn't Hang, he met producer Pat Collier (Wonderstuff, Primal Scream) who offered him a space to work in at his own Greenhouse studio. He set up a programming room there and became involved in the nascent rave scene that was burgeoning in the UK in the late 1980s and early 1990s. He released several solo singles/EPs under various names before coming to the attention of John Digweed who at the time was a young upcoming DJ just beginning to break through.

Together they started writing and remixing club tracks under the name Bedrock. It was not long into their association that they wrote and recorded the track "For What You Dream Of", which featured on the seminal ground breaking compilation Renaissance - The Mix Collection put together by John in conjunction with Sasha, a DJ who had achieved cult status and a sizeable following through his work at Manchester's famous Haçienda nightclub. The track was also used in the club scene of the film Trainspotting and included in the hugely successful soundtrack album of the film. It is widely regarded as a classic club anthem and helped to define the genre that would become known as progressive house.

During the 1990s, Muir was involved mostly in writing and remixing club tracks both on his own, with John Digweed as Bedrock and other collaborators. His single "Rok Star" under the name Marshall Stax charted in the UK and was used as the theme music for the Brit Awards for that year. Bedrock made several singles which got into the UK charts including "Heaven Scent" and "Voices"; their music was extensively used on film and TV and they wrote and recorded several scores for films including Stark Raving Mad and Spider-Man: The New Animated Series, the latter of which won a Dancestar award in the U.S. for 'Best Use of Music in a TV Show' in 2004.

Muir continues to work as a writer and producer of club mixes and soundtracks.

== Discography ==
=== Singles ===
- 1999: "Dark Blue"
- 2005: "Bride of Frankenstein" (with KG)
- 2005: "Frankinstein"
- 2005: "Savin' You" (featuring Craig Walker)
- 2007: "I Feel Real"
- 2007: "G Platz"
- 2007: "Feedback from the City" (with Neil Quigley featuring Nadine Khouri)
- 2008: "Tekno"
- 2008: "Ain't Nobody"
- 2008: "Airtight"
- 2009: "Fu Man Chew"
- 2018: "Mirror Walk" / "In the Room"
