= Sphynx (band) =

Sphynx is a US dance music act who hit #1 on the Hot Dance Music/Club Play chart in 1995 with the song "What Hope Have I". Lead vocals on this track were sung by Sabrina Johnston, a female dance singer from New Jersey. Johnston also has US dance chart entries as a solo artist.

This act is not to be confused with disco-era studio group assembled by Egyptian producer Alec R. Costandinos, called Sphinx.

== See also ==
- List of number-one dance hits (United States)
- List of artists who reached number one on the US Dance chart
