= Cash Generator =

United Kingdom–based retailer

Cash Gen UK Limited
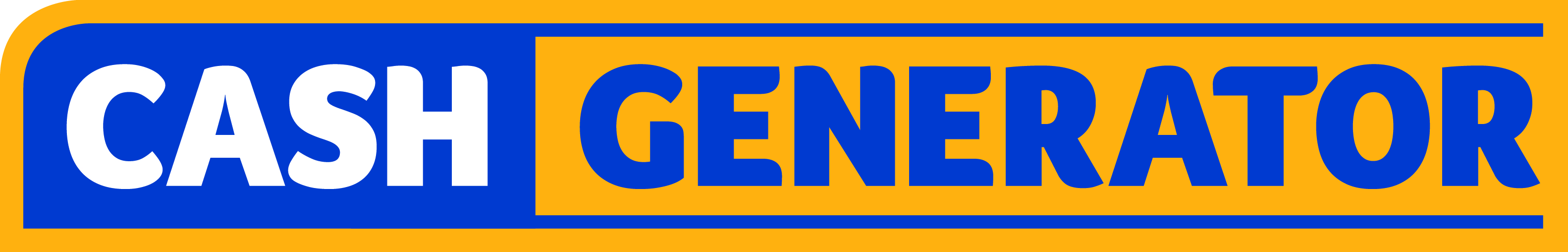
- Type: Private Limited
- Industry: Retail
- Founded: 14 February 1994
- Headquarters: Edinburgh, United Kingdom
- Number of locations: 120+ (2018)
- Products: New, second hand, and refurbished household goods
- Services: Money transfer; Currency exchange; Vape products
- Revenue: £30 million (2013)
- Number of employees: 500+ (2018)
- Website: cashgenerator.co.uk

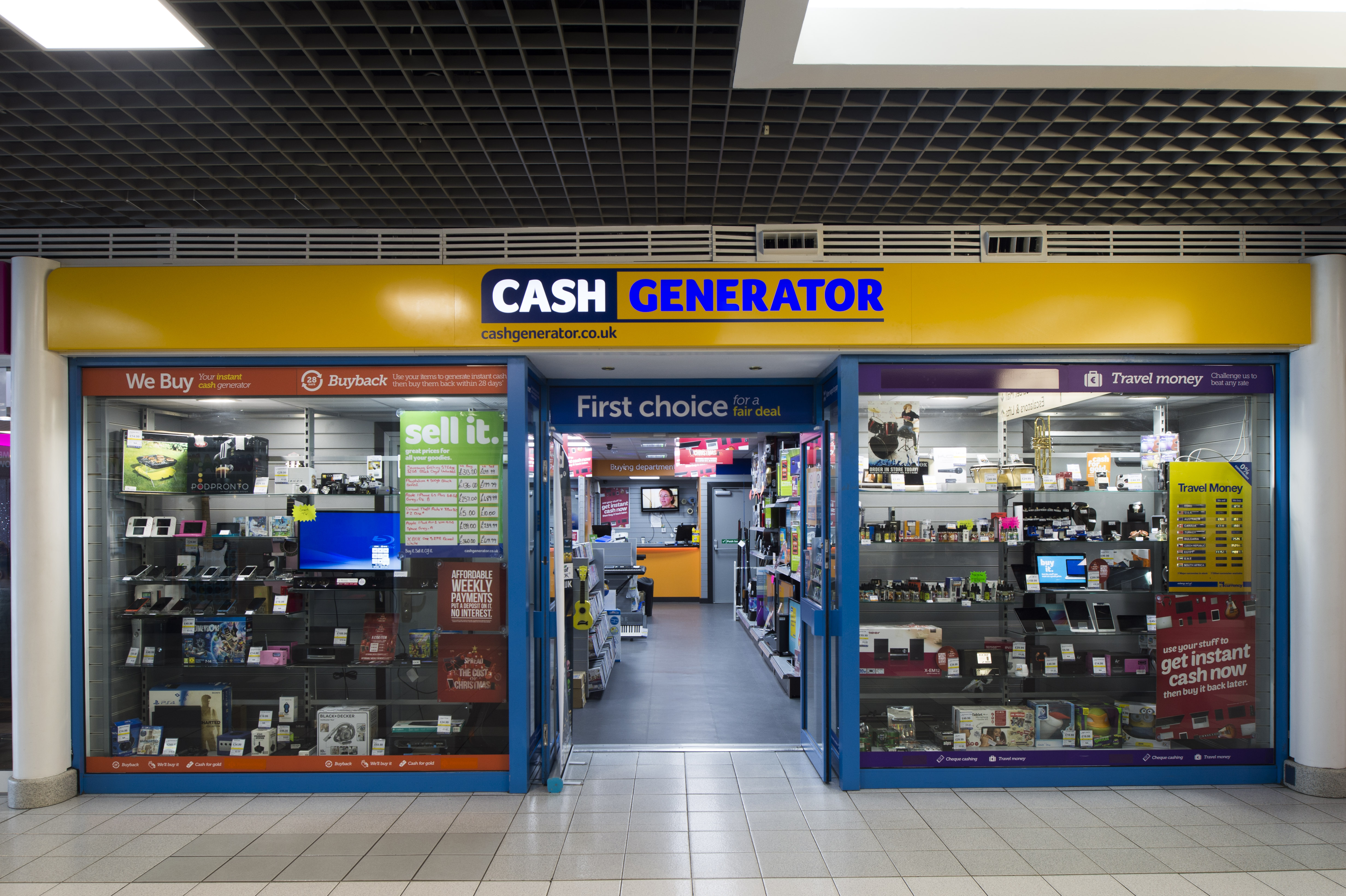
Cash Generator The Forge, Glasgow

Cash Gen UK Limited, trading as Cash Generator, is a United Kingdom–based Buy and Sell store. Its headquarters are in Edinburgh, United Kingdom. The retailer opened its first store in Bolton in February 1994. The company has expanded, with corporate and franchise stores, and currently has 120+ stores across the United Kingdom (2018).

The company describes itself as a Buy, Sell and Buy Back Store. Its core business is the buying and selling of second hand goods, mainly electrical, entertainment products and gold.

== History ==
Cash Generator was founded in 1994, by British businessman Brian Lewis. Having noticed the success of a similar business in the United States, he decided to emulate the business model in the United Kingdom, and opened his first store in Bolton, Greater Manchester on Valentine's Day 1994. After opening 15 corporate stores in the North of England, Lewis launched the franchise network, opening the first franchise store in 1997. The headquarters were located in Bolton until 2012, when they moved to Edinburgh.

Cash Generator logo (up to April 2014)

Within the first year of opening, the company changed its name to Cash Generator. Brian Lewis decided upon the name after changing other elements in response to customer feedback: "When theory hits practicality, practicality always wins. For instance, the original name was 'Paragon', but we changed it because it didn't say what we did. We are a 'cash generator'."

Cash Generator was 100% owned by Lewis from February 1994, until April 2008, when a management buyout was staged by three directors and in conjunction with New World Corporate Finance. The acquisition meant that the founder Lewis was bought out, remaining as a shareholding non executive director. The three directors included Julian Urry, Managing Director of Cash Generator, from 2004, previously CEO of Cash Converters, Robin Page, Franchise Director and Steve Wilkinson, Finance Director. In 2012 Axcess Financial Services Group Purchased Cash Generator to help expand its loan business – it already operated Cheque Centres Ltd. In 2017 Axcess sold Cash Generator to investors Rcapital.

On 9 April 2008, three directors, Julian Urry, financial director Steve Wilkinson and franchising director Robin Page, with additional finance from New World Corporate Finance bought out founder Brian Lewis, forming a new company (Cash Generator Holdings Limited) in the process. Lewis remained as a shareholding non executive director.

In February 2010, the company launched its new 'Express' store concept, opening stores on select trunk roads and arterial routes, with high visibility and easy access for local residents.

In December 2010, the company was acquired by United States-based financial services group Axcess Financial, for an undisclosed sum.

In 2011 they opened 21 new stores and the company moved in to franchising. This allowed a further 29 stores ran by franchisees to open that same year. By 2015, Cash Generator owned 223 stores. In December 2012, Cash Generator recruited a new managing director, Allan May, who had previously been head of operations at Comet.

In 2017, Axcess sold Cash Generator to investors Rcapital.

As of June 2018, Cash Generator is a purely franchisee focused business with a defined business model with over 120 stores and 58 franchisees, which includes stores ranging from Cornwall to Northern Scotland.

== Operations ==
As of June 2026, there are 100+ Cash Generator stores operating in the United Kingdom, all of which are franchise operations., all stores are now franchise stores

In 2011, it was stated that the average store receives 5,000 visits a week. In 2009, the company launched CashGenerator.co.uk as a fully transactional website that allows customers to browse and shop online.

=== Retail operations ===
Some Cash Generator stores have three counters; retail, buying and financial; but it is mostly focused on Retail and Buying.

The core businesses activity is the buying and selling of second-hand goods, mainly electrical and entertainment products such as televisions, games consoles, mobile phones, games, laptops, tablets, gold and jewellery. In addition to second-hand items, the stores also sell new and refurbished domestic goods.

=== Buying counter ===
In each Cash Generator, the buying counter offers customers cash for their unwanted household goods and gold. The retailer also offers a "buy-back" service, where customers receive cash for an item, with the option to buy back the goods within 28 days, or renew for another 28 days. Previously, Cash Generator offered a traditional pawnbroking service, turning gold or jewellery into cash with an unlimited six-month loan against the value of goods.

Cash Generator only buys from over 18s, and two forms of ID are required, including photo identification and proof of address to avoid fraud.

=== Financial services ===
Cash Generator offers a range of financial services, including cheque cashing, money transfer, foreign currency exchange in some stores. The company has a partnership with Western Union and Number One Currency. In 2015, the company ceased issuing short-term loans as the market for Payday Loans became more heavily regulated; with a greater focus on buying, selling and Buy Back. Services vary in each store so check out availability via the website.

== Corporate affairs ==
Since its establishment in 1994, the company has shown year on year growth in all its income streams in every year it has been trading. In 2009, the total retail sales of the group amounted to £73.6 million; overall gross profits were £30.1 million.

=== Franchise model ===
Since 1997, the business has grown mainly through franchising. The total investment required to start a Cash Generator franchise was estimated between £200,000 and £250,000. Of this figure, between £70,000 and £80,000 was expected to be personal investment. The company invited applications from Master Franchise partners for overseas markets in Europe in the past.

As of 2018, the investment required to start a Cash Generator franchise is between £120,000 and £200,000; with £35,000 and £60,000 expected to be from personal investment. The company are again in the market for new franchisees within the United Kingdom, with new franchises being established in targeted geographical areas throughout the UK.

=== Logos and slogans ===
Stores originally carried the strap line "The Buy & Sell Store". Then to reflect the increasing availability of financial services, the slogan was updated to "The Buy, Sell & Loan Store". But since the move away from financial services, the slogan was updated to "Now here's a great deal!" in reference to the in-store and online deals.

=== Charity connection ===
Previously, the company's adopted charity was Make-A-Wish Foundation of the United Kingdom. The charity's logo appeared in the company's television advertising.

== Trade bodies and accreditations ==
The company has the following memberships and accreditations:

- British Franchise Association (BFA)
- Institute of Customer Service (ICS)
