= Spider-Man: The New Animated Series =

Animated superhero television series

- Genre: Superhero; Teen drama
- Based on: Spider-Man by: Stan Lee; Steve Ditko
- Developed by: Brian Michael Bendis; Morgan Gendel; Marsha Griffin
- Voices of: Neil Patrick Harris; Lisa Loeb; Ian Ziering
- Narrated by: Neil Patrick Harris
- Theme music composer: John Digweed; Nick Muir
- Composers: John Digweed; Nick Muir; William Kevin Anderson
- Countries of origin: United States; Canada
- Original language: English
- No. of seasons: 1
- No. of episodes: 13

Production
- Executive producers: Avi Arad; Rick Ungar; Stan Lee; Morgan Gendel
- Producer: Marsha Griffin
- Editor: Bruce A. King
- Running time: 22 minutes
- Production companies: Mainframe Entertainment; Marvel Enterprises; Adelaide Productions; Sony Pictures Television

Original release
- Network: MTV (United States); YTV (Canada)
- Release: July 11 – September 12, 2003

Spider-Man: The New Animated Series, or simply Spider-Man, is an animated superhero television series based on the Marvel Comics character Spider-Man and produced by Mainframe Entertainment, Marvel Enterprises, Adelaide Productions and Sony Pictures Television. Initially intended to serve as a continuation of Sam Raimi's film Spider-Man (2002), the show was made using computer-generated imagery (CGI) rendered in cel shading. It ran for only one season of 13 episodes, airing from July 11 to September 12, 2003, and was broadcast on cable channels MTV in the United States and YTV in Canada.

Initially connected to the Spider-Man film series, the series' events were contradicted by Spider-Man 2 (2004), rendering it a separate universe.

== Series overview ==
Set shortly after the events of the 2002 film and before the events of the 2004 sequel. Peter Parker, and his friends Mary Jane Watson, and Harry Osborn start attending Empire State University together. Peter and Mary Jane try to establish a relationship without much success. Peter's superhero duties, and later his involvement with Indira Daimonji, interfere with his romance with Mary Jane, while Harry continuously blames Spider-Man for the death of his father Norman Osborn. Peter faces an assortment of other villains including the Lizard, Kraven the Hunter and Electro while trying to maintain a job and his studies.

== Cast and characters ==
=== Main ===
- Neil Patrick Harris as Peter Parker / Spider-Man: A superhero who is also an Empire State University student and photographer for the Daily Bugle. Peter confronts with the desire to use his powers to do good, he finds it hard balancing his responsibilities of being a superhero with schoolwork and his romance with Mary Jane Watson.
- Lisa Loeb as Mary Jane Watson: A student at Empire State University and model/actress. She is the on-and-off girlfriend of Peter Parker, but also seems to still hold some affection for Peter's alter-ego, Spider-Man, who she is unaware are both the same person.
- Ian Ziering as Harry Osborn: The son of the late industrialist Norman Osborn. He attends Empire State University along with his friends Peter Parker and Mary Jane Watson. Ironically, he blames Spider-Man for his father's death and seeks revenge, but is oblivious to the fact that his father was the Green Goblin, and accidentally triggered his own death; however, as the series progresses, Harry has shown to warm up to Spider-Man, as well as helping him defeat Electro and accept being rescued from the Lizard.

=== Recurring ===
- Keith Carradine as J. Jonah Jameson: The Daily Bugle newspaper publisher. Consistent with his appearances in the comics and films, Jameson spent most of his appearances berating Spider-Man and adding political spin to his activities, usually in front of Peter Parker.
- Angelle Brooks as Indira "Indy" Daimonji, a journalist and Peter Parker's occasional girlfriend.

=== Guest ===
- Stan Lee as Frank Elson
- Rob Zombie as Curt Connors / Lizard
- Eve as Cheyenne / Talon
- Kathy Griffin as Roxanne Gaines
- Jeremy Piven as Roland Gaines
- Michael Dorn as Kraven the Hunter
- Michael Clarke Duncan as Kingpin. Duncan reprises his role from the 2003 Daredevil film.
- Keith David as FBI Agent Mosely
- Jeffrey Combs as Dr. Zellner
- David DeLuise as Mack and Jack
- Clancy Brown as Raymond
- Virginia Madsen as Silver Sable
- James Marsters as Sergei
- Harold Perrineau as Turbo Jet
- Ed Asner as Officer Bar. Asner had previously voiced J. Jonah Jameson in the 1990s animated series.
- Gina Gershon as Shikata
- John C. McGinley as Richard Daimian
- Ethan Embry as Max Dillon / Electro
- Devon Sawa as Flash Thompson
- Tara Strong as Christina
- Cree Summer as Professor Williams
- Jeff Fischer as Doug Reisman

== Production ==
Spider-Man in the 3D animated style, art by Fred Pashe.

Spider-Man: The New Animated Series was ordered by MTV as early as January 2002. Initially, it was supposed to be an adaptation of the Ultimate Spider-Man comics by Brian Michael Bendis. However, after the success of Sam Raimi's 2002 Spider-Man film, the show was reworked to follow its continuity. The computer-generated imagery (CGI) was produced by Mainframe Entertainment. Michael Rosenbaum was approached for the lead role, but he didn't audition. Neil Patrick Harris, Lisa Loeb, and Ian Ziering were announced as the primary voice cast in May 2002. The producers found that the relaxed standards of MTV allowed them more creative freedom than usually allowed for a Saturday-morning cartoon.

Peter Parker was originally supposed to wear baggier clothes to hide his superhero musculature, but cost-effective difficulties with the CGI prevented folds from being put into his everyday attire. As a result, Peter's street clothes were redesigned to be close-fitting and contemporary, while still managing to hide his physique (and the costume he wore under his clothes) as Spider-Man. The character of Aunt May was not included in the series (except for a photograph in Peter's bedroom), because MTV executives feared that the appearance of any elderly people would deter their target youth audience from watching.

The series was canceled after only 13 episodes, reportedly due to low ratings. Director Brandon Vietti stated that had the series gone on he would have used the villains Mysterio, Vulture, and more of Kraven.

== Episodes ==
The episodes aired on MTV out of the correct scripted order. The DVD releases feature the episodes in the correct order.

No.	Title	Directed by	Written by	Original release date
1	"Heroes & Villains"	Tim Eldred	Morgan Gendel	July 11, 2003
Spider-Man battles Turbo Jet, a modern-day Robin Hood armed with a homemade propulsion system, who steals from the wealthy and gives to the poor. Spidey's life gets even harder as the public rallies around Turbo Jet – and against Spider-Man.
2	"Flash Memory"	Tim Eldred	Whip Lipsey and Scott Lipsey	July 11, 2003
Dr. Zellner tests his "smart drug" on Peter Parker foe Flash Thompson, and Flash immediately displays dramatic spikes in intellect. However, along with the IQ boost comes a potentially fatal side effect. With only minutes to find an antidote, Zellner takes Flash's suggestion that he experiment on an already intelligent candidate: Peter Parker.
3	"Keeping Secrets"	Alan Caldwell	Marsha Griffin	July 18, 2003
Spider-Man is out to catch Talon, a female thief who's behind a series of high-risk robberies in the city. Things get complicated when Spidey learns Talon's true identity – she is his best friend Harry's new girlfriend.
4	"Head Over Heels"	Brandon Vietti	Tracey Forbes	July 18, 2003
Peter Parker's lab partner Christina reads his mind with her new invention: an ESP crown. The crown malfunctions, jolting her own brain with electricity and altering her sanity. No longer able to distinguish fantasy from reality, Christina attempts to kill MJ in order to limit the competition for Spider-Man's eternal affection.
5	"The Party"	Audu Paden	Story by : Brian Michael Bendis; Teleplay by : Brian Michael Bendis, Morgan Gendel and Marsha Griffin	July 25, 2003
Peter Parker's nerdy high-school friend Max is hazed in a deadly fraternity prank that turns him into Electro, a high-voltage villain that threatens the campus. Only Spider-Man can stop him from exacting his revenge on the students.
6	"When Sparks Fly"	Vincent Edwards	Morgan Gendel	August 1, 2003
Electro returns from his seeming death and tries to make Sally, a girl he has a crush on, become an electrical being just like him.
7	"Royal Scam"	Vincent Edwards	Rick Suvalle	August 15, 2003
Spider-Man is tricked by the infamous Kingpin into stealing the TX-1 super-chip, designed to decrypt the confidential satellite transmissions that drive the world's financial markets. Now he must find a way to get it back. This episode features celebrity guest star Michael Clarke Duncan, who reprises his role as the Kingpin from Daredevil.
8	"Tight Squeeze"	Vincent Edwards	Morgan Gendel	August 22, 2003
Three ex-KGB agents – now a team of mercenaries called Pterodax – take a group of people hostage, including Peter and his new crush Indy. Their demand is that they want Spider-Man. Peter will need to use his cunning and cleverness to figure out a way to appease Pterodax without revealing his alter-ego.
9	"The Sword of Shikata"	Brandon Vietti	Todd Felderstein and Morgan Gendel	August 25, 2003
The master martial artist/assassin Shikata is sent to capture Spider-Man for a wealthy man's collection of rare animals. Shikata determines that Spider-Man is too noble a foe to simply capture and they must fight to the death.
10	"Spider-Man Dis-Sabled"	Alan Caldwell	Morgan Gendel and Rick Suvalle	August 29, 2003
Peter covers a press conference and inadvertently videotapes incriminating evidence against Silver Sable, an Eastern European assassin for hire. Now she will stop at nothing – including killing Mary Jane, Harry, and Indy – to get the tape back.
11	"Law of the Jungle"	Audu Paden	Greg Johnson	September 4, 2003
Peter's professor, Dr. Curt Connors, injects himself with reptilian DNA, which slowly changes him into the angry, vengeful Lizard. As the serum affects Connors' brain, Spider-Man must stop his beloved professor as he begins seeking revenge on those who have harmed him, including Harry.
12	"Mind Games, Part One"	Alan Caldwell, Vincent Edwards and Audu Paden	Morgan Gendel	September 5, 2003
The Gaines Twins, a brother and sister with uncanny telepathy, escape from an armored transport convoy, but Spider-Man apprehends them by overcoming their brain blasts with his own superhuman willpower. Later, just as Spider-Man reveals to MJ that he is really Peter Parker, Kraven the Hunter confronts Spider-Man. As payback for the years he spent in jail, Kraven attacks MJ with one of his poison darts. Spider-Man rushes to her side too late, as her life slowly slips away. Now, Peter is out for revenge.
13	"Mind Games, Part Two"	Tim Eldred and Brandon Vietti	Steven Kriozere	September 12, 2003
Spider-Man realizes that the diabolical Gaines Twins have brain-blasted him into believing that MJ has died at the hands of Kraven the Hunter. He corners the Twins, but things take a turn for the worse when they once again use their telepathy to trick Spider-Man. This time Indy is seriously wounded and ends up in coma. The guilt causes Peter to pack his costume inside of a suitcase filled with bricks and throw it into the water, quitting his career as a crime-fighter.

== Reception ==
In 2004, the series was nominated for an Annie Award for Outstanding Achievement in an Animated Television Production while "Keeping Secrets" got a nomination in Outstanding Storyboarding in an Animated Television Production.

== Home media ==
The complete series was released on DVD as Spider-Man: The New Animated Series: Special Edition on January 13, 2004. Four separate DVD volumes containing three episodes each were also released from 2004 to 2005. These releases contained various behind-the-scenes featurettes, as well as trailers for Cowboy Bebop, Osamu Tezuka's Metropolis, Cyborg 009, Tokyo Godfathers, and the theatrical trailers for Spider-Man and Spider-Man 2. The entire series was licensed by Marvel and Sony to DigiKids/Sentimental Journeys, who re-edited the footage from many episodes into one feature, which is sold as a personalized DVD in which the purchaser's face is revealed under Spider-Man's mask.

The series was made available for streaming on Disney+ on October 19, 2022, but the episodes appear in their original air date order and not chronologically. On December 4, 2023, it was removed. As of June 2025, the series is available for streaming on Amazon Prime Video, YouTube, and Fandango at Home through purchase.
