= Ken Doh =

British musical duo

- Origin: United Kingdom
- Genre: House
- Years active: 1996
- Past members: Michael Devlin; Steve Burgess

Ken Doh was an electronic music production duo from Newcastle-upon-Tyne, made up of DJ Michael Devlin and engineer Steve Burgess, who had a UK top 10 hit in 1996.

== History ==
The only official release from the duo, on the FFRR label, was the Nakasaki EP, also described as "I Need A Lover Tonight" after the song's main chorus line; although described as an extended play, it was made up of the title track and three remixes; the track was originally an instrumental only, but Devlin - who wrote and produced the single - added vocals from a singer, Kofi, for the purposes of a commercial release.

The EP entered the UK singles charts at number 7 for the week ending 30 March 1996, ensuring the song appeared on Top of the Pops on 28 March, albeit rwithout Devlin, who did not want to appear. It also topped the dance music charts the same week, ahead of "Firestarter" by The Prodigy, which was number 1 on the national charts.

The single dropped the following week, eventually spending 7 weeks in the top 75. Although a follow-up ("Take Me Higher") was planned, it never received a full release, making Ken Doh a one-hit wonder.
