= Take It Easy (Mad Lion song) =

Single by Mad Lion

from the album Real Ting
- B-side: "Big Box of Blunts"
- Released: May 24, 1994
- Recorded: 1994
- Studio: D&D Studios (New York)
- Genre: hip hop; reggae fusion; ragga
- Length: 4:38 (album version)
- Label: Nervous; Weeded; Front Page
- Songwriters: Oswald Preist; Lawrence Parker
- Producer: KRS-One

Mad Lion singles chronology
"Take It Easy" (1994)	"Shoot to Kill" (1994)

"Take It Easy" is a hip hop and reggae fusion song, recorded by hip-hop/dancehall artist Mad Lion from his debut studio album, Real Ting (1994). The song contains a sample of "When A Man In Love" by Yami Bolo and "Return of the Boom Bap" from collaborator KRS-One from his 1993 debut album of the same name.

== Background and music video ==
The song is also notable for its music video (which received heavy rotation on BET) which featured cameos by KRS-One (whose classic track "Black Cop" was sampled at the beginning of the video) and an early appearance by fellow rapper Fat Joe. The video was filmed in the South Bronx and Queens section of New York City.

== Samples in other songs ==
The record was later sampled by artists such as A$AP Rocky, A$AP Ferg, Somethin' for the People, Nine, Hillfiguz and most recently by rapper Fabolous from his Friday Night Freestyles series.

The Notorious B.I.G. rapped over "Take It Easy" using lyrics from his popular non-single cut "Unbelievable" (from his debut Ready to Die) during his first national radio interview with Funkmaster Flex on Hot 97 in early July 1994.

== Commercial performance ==
The record became Mad Lion's biggest crossover hit, peaking at number 69 on the Billboard Hot 100, staying inside the chart for twenty weeks. It also peaked inside the top 40 of the Billboard Hot R&B/Hip-Hop Songs chart, reaching number 35.
