= Dance Singles Sales =

Record chart

The Dance Singles Sales was a record chart released weekly by Billboard magazine listing each week's best-selling dance singles in the United States. Its previous names include Hot Dance/Disco 12-inch Singles Sales (1985–1987), Hot Dance Music 12-inch Singles Sales (1987–1992), and Hot Dance Music Maxi-Singles Sales (1992–2003). The chart was compiled from a national sample of retail stores, mass merchants, and internet sales reports collected and provided by Nielsen SoundScan. It was launched on the issue dated March 16, 1985, with the first number-one single being "New Attitude"/"Axel F", a split single by Patti LaBelle and Harold Faltermeyer from Beverly Hills Cop soundtrack. The chart became defunct after the issue dated November 30, 2013, with Borgore's "Wild Out" (featuring Waka Flocka Flame and Paige) as its final number-one single.

== History ==
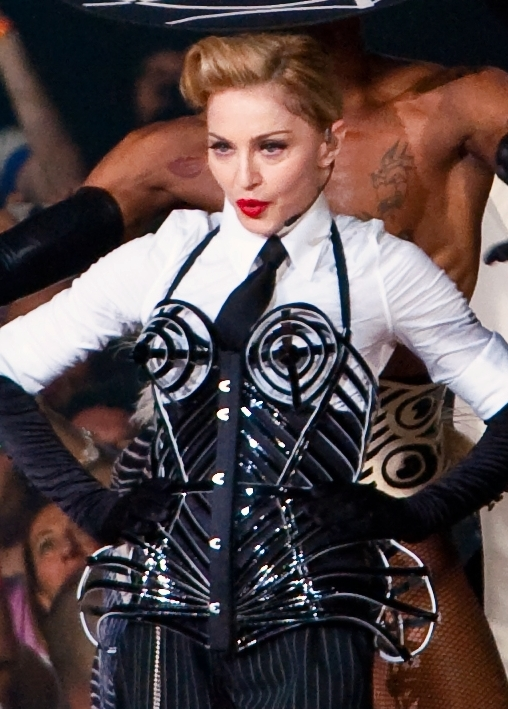
Madonna achieved 33 number-one singles on the chart, the most by any artist.

From October 26, 1974 until August 28, 1976, Billboard magazine's Disco Action section published weekly charts of retail single sales from various local regions along with Top Audience Response Records. Billboard debuted its first national chart devoted exclusively to sales of 12-inch singles in their issue dated March 16, 1985. This record type is most commonly used in disco and dance music genres where DJs use them to play in discos or dance clubs because of the exclusive extended remixes that are often only made available on this format, but Billboard's 12-inch Single Sales chart ranks releases by artists from all styles of music that release maxi-singles.

The 50-position weekly ranking joined Billboard's established Dance/Disco Top 80 chart, reduced to the same 50 positions, both under the title Hot Dance/Disco, becoming two separate Top 50 charts: 12-Inch Singles Sales and Club Play. A coupling from MCA Records' Beverly Hills Cop soundtrack, Patti LaBelle's "New Attitude" and Harold Faltermeyer's "Axel F", held the No. 1 slot for the 12-inch Singles Sales chart's first week and was also No. 1 for the second consecutive week on the most played dance/disco chart.

The word "disco" was removed from the title of the section of both charts beginning September 19, 1987. After being temporarily renamed Hot Dance 50, Billboard retitled the section Hot Dance Music on October 24, 1987.

On the first Billboard Music Awards in 1990, Janet Jackson was awarded #1 Hot Dance 12-inch Singles Sales Artist. The 1991 winner for #1 Hot Dance 12" Singles Sales was C + C Music Factory featuring Freedom Williams' "Gonna Make You Sweat (Everybody Dance Now)".

On June 20, 1992, Billboard began to also survey cassette tape and CD maxi-singles along with vinyl twelve-inch singles renaming the chart Maxi-Singles Sales. In 1993, the Billboard Music Award winner for #1 12" Dance Single was RuPaul's "Supermodel (You Better Work)". The Maxi-Singles Sales survey began using actual sales figures (SoundScan) to compile the chart on August 28, 1993.

On July 28, 2001, Billboard launches the 15 position Top Electronic Albums chart and reduces the Maxi-Singles Sales chart size from 50 to 25 positions, 30 positions online. Billboard renamed the Maxi-Singles Sales survey to Dance Singles Sales on March 1, 2003, although the survey would continue to chart popular maxi-singles by artists from other genres of music besides dance even more frequently such as hip hop & rap artists like Public Enemy and 2Pac and alternative rock & industrial metal bands such as The Smiths and Ministry. 2006's "Every Day Is Exactly the Same" by Nine Inch Nails topped the sales chart more than any other single with 36 inconsecutive weeks, yet never appeared on the Hot Dance Club Play survey.

Dance Singles Sales is retitled Hot Dance Single Sales when the top 25 Hot Dance Radio Airplay begins to appear in print on October 25 of that year. The single "Me Against the Music" by Britney Spears and Madonna won the award for "Hot Dance Singles Sales Single of the Year" at the Billboard Music Awards in 2004.

Beginning April 30, 2005, the Billboard Dance section started alternately printing Hot Dance Single Sales and Top Electronic Albums every other week in the magazine until Hot Dance Single Sales became only available at billboard.biz after the February 24, 2007 issue. Billboard reduces the position size of the Hot Dance Singles chart from 25 to 15 positions on March 30, 2007.

The size of the Dance Singles Sales chart is reduced further down to 10 positions on October 3, 2009. Billboard's Dance/Electronic Digital Song Sales, a 50 position chart ranking of the most popular downloaded songs ranked by sales data as compiled by Luminate, debuted online January 23, 2010. After years of falling record sales, Billboard discontinued their weekly Dance Singles Sales survey in 2013. The last chart of the nearly 29 year old national survey was published online November 30, 2013.

== List of number-one singles ==
=== 1980s–1990s ===
- 1985
- 1986
- 1987
- 1988
- 1989
- 1990
- 1991
- 1992
- 1993
- 1994
- 1995
- 1996
- 1997
- 1998
- 1999

=== 2000s–2010s ===
- 2000
- 2001
- 2002
- 2003
- 2004
- 2005
- 2006
- 2007
- 2008
- 2009
- 2010
- 2011
- 2012

== Achievements and milestones ==
=== Top-charting singles by year ===
The following are the top-charting singles for each year of the duration of the Hot Dance Singles Sales survey.

Peak Year	Weeks at #1	Total Weeks	Single	Artist	Ref
1985	8	24	"I Like You"	Phyllis Nelson	
1986	9	19	"Brand New Lover"	Dead or Alive	
1987	5	15	"Head to Toe"	Lisa Lisa & Cult Jam	
1988	4	21	"Never Gonna Give You Up"	Rick Astley	
1989	8	11	"Pump Up The Jam"	Technotronic f/Felly	
1990	6	13	"Vogue"	Madonna	
1991	6	18	"Gypsy Woman (She's Homeless)"	Crystal Waters	
1992	5	11	"Remember the Time"	Michael Jackson	
1993	6	18	"Hey Mr. D.J."	Zhané	
1994	9	30	"Take It Easy"	Mad Lion	
1995	8	28	"Fantasy"	Mariah Carey	
1996	12	37	"How Do U Want It" / "California Love"	2PAC Featuring K-Ci & JoJo	
1997	12	37	"I'll Be Missing You"	Puff Daddy & Faith Evans (Feat. 112)	
1998	21	65	"The Boy Is Mine"	Brandy & Monica	
1999	16	50	"Sexual (Li Da Di)"	Amber	
2000	11	86	"Music"	Madonna	
2001	15	34	"Lifetime" (Ben Watt Remix)	Maxwell	
2002	16	57	"Die Another Day" (Remixes)	Madonna	
2003	12	39	"Rubberneckin'" (Paul Oakenfold Remix)	Elvis Presley	
2004	15	41	"Amazing" (Full Intention & Jack 'N' Rory Mixes)	George Michael	
2005	17	113	"We Will Become Silhouettes" / "Be Still My Heart"	The Postal Service	
2006	36	102	"Every Day Is Exactly the Same"	Nine Inch Nails	
2007	9	26	"Cuntry Boner"	Puscifer	
2008	8	114	"Just Dance"	Lady Gaga Featuring Colby O'Donis	
2009	8	16	"Halo"	Beyoncé	
2010	16	61	"Stereo Love"	Edward Maya & Vika Jigulina	
2011	18	49	"Born This Way"	Lady Gaga	
2012	22	33	"Call Me Maybe"	Carly Rae Jepsen	
2013	10	56	"Forever"	Haim	

=== Singles with the most weeks at number one ===
The following singles peaked at #1 for more than 12 weeks on the Hot Dance Singles Sales survey.

Peak date	Weeks at #1	Total Weeks	Single	Artist	Ref
April 22, 2006	36	102	"Every Day Is Exactly the Same"	Nine Inch Nails	
June 9, 2012	22	33	"Call Me Maybe"	Carly Rae Jepsen	
June 6, 1998	21	65	"The Boy Is Mine"	Brandy & Monica	
December 5, 1998	20	102	"Believe"	Cher	
April 2, 2011	18	49	"Born This Way"	Lady Gaga	
February 26, 2005	17	113	"We Will Become Silhouettes" / "Be Still My Heart"	The Postal Service	
November 13, 2010	16	61	"Stereo Love"	Edward Maya & Vika Jigulina	
November 9, 2002	16	57	"Die Another Day" (Remixes)	Madonna	
August 14, 1999	16	50	"Sexual (Li Da Di)"	Amber	
June 5, 2004	15	41	"Amazing" (Full Intention & Jack 'N' Rory Mixes)	George Michael	
November 10, 2001	15	34	"Lifetime" (Ben Watt Remix)	Maxwell	
January 3, 2004	13	78	"Me Against the Music"	Britney Spears Featuring Madonna	
October 29, 2011	13	16	"Video Games"	Lana Del Rey	

=== Singles with the most weeks charting ===
The following #1 singles charted over 100 total weeks each on the Hot Dance Singles Sales survey.

Debut date	Artist	Single	Total Weeks	Ref
May 5, 1998	Mariah Carey	"My All" / "Fly Away (Butterfly Reprise)"	101	
November 28, 1998	Cher	"Believe"	102	
May 13, 2000	Sting Featuring Cheb Mami	"Desert Rose" (Victor Calderone Remix)	103	
February 19, 2005	The Postal Service	"We Will Become Silhouettes" / "Be Still My Heart"	113	
April 22, 2006	Nine Inch Nails	"Every Day Is Exactly the Same"	102	
July 12, 2008	Lady Gaga Featuring Colby O'Donis	"Just Dance"	114	

=== Artists with the most number-one singles ===
The following artists charted 5 or more #1 singles on the Hot Dance Singles Sales survey between 1985 and 2013.

Artist	Total #1
Madonna	33
Janet Jackson	9
Lady Gaga	9
Depeche Mode	8
Mariah Carey	7
Michael Jackson	7
Prince	7
The Notorious B.I.G.	6
George Michael	5
Mindless Self Indulgence	5
