= Phillip Ean Cohen =

Australian private equity investor

Phillip Cohen
- Born: Phillip Ean Cohen; Melbourne, Victoria, Australia
- Education: University of Melbourne; Harvard Business School
- Occupations: Investor, Chairman of Morgan Schiff & Co.

Phillip Ean Cohen is an Australian private equity investor. He was featured in Rainmaker by Anthony Bianco.

== Biography ==
Cohen grew up in Melbourne, Victoria where he was a determined Australian Rules Football player. He started his career at Kuhn Loeb, and was tagged as a rising star in the Mergers department. After a stint at First Boston, he was recruited by Jeffery Beck to Oppenheimer & Co.'s Corporate advisory department. Cohen was responsible for the group's first eleven transactions, making upwards of $20 million for the department as a 28-year-old partner. Cohen was contributing nearly 60% of the department's revenue, yet his lack of respect to senior management made him ineligible for bonuses.

As a result, Cohen started taking a self-imposed fee on his deals; other Opco employees called these fees "Cohen Commissions". Due to his productivity, Cohen's self-imposed commissions initially went unpunished, however eventually Jeff Beck was forced to fire him. With money from his side dealings, and advice from Ivan Boesky and Michael Milken, Cohen started his own firm, Morgan Schiff & Co., who eventually became the majority and then exclusive shareholder of voting stock for the public company, EZCORP, Inc. headquartered in Austin, TX. As of 2002, he lives in New York City.

== Quotes ==
"With his tailored Savile Row suits, Oxford accent, and patronizing manner, Cohen seems like the quintessential Wall Street sophisticate- very polished, very international. In actuality, though, he is Australian, not English, and his diffidence masks an extreme aggressiveness" (BusinessWeek)
