= Blue Amazon (group) =

English electronic music act

- Origin: Huddersfield, England
- Genres: Electronic; trance
- Years active: 1993–present
- Labels: Convert; Jackpot; Creative; Subversive; A Rec
- Members: Lee Softley
- Past members: James Reid

Blue Amazon is an English electronic music act founded by Lee Softley and James Reid. Reid left the group in 2000 and Softley adopted the name as a solo moniker. Their 1990s singles "No Other Love", "And Then the Rain Falls" and "Coming Home" all entered the UK Singles Chart, and they released their debut and only studio album, The Javelin, in 1997. In addition, they have remixed work for musicians including Sasha, Skunk Anansie, New Order and Madonna.

== Discography ==
=== Studio albums ===
| Title | Album details |
|---|---|
| The Javelin | Released: 1997; Label: Jackpot, S3; Formats: CD, vinyl |

=== Compilation albums ===
| Title | Album details |
|---|---|
| The Best of Blue Amazon: The Hybrid | Released: 29 August 2011; Label: 7PM; Formats: Digital download |

=== Singles ===
| Title | Year | Peak chart positions | | Album |
| Title | Year | UK | UK Dance | Album |
|---|---|---|---|---|
| "Hyper Sleep" | 1993 | — | — | Non-album singles |
| "Star of David" / "The Blessing" | 1995 | — | — | Non-album singles |
| "Four Seasons" / "The Runner" | 1995 | — | — | The Javelin |
| "No Other Love" | 1996 | 148 | 1 | The Javelin |
| "And Then the Rain Falls" | 1997 | 53 | 9 | The Javelin |
| "Coming Home" | 1999 | 80 | — | Non-album singles |
| "Electroplate" (vs Bill Hamel) | 1999 | — | — | Non-album singles |
| "Breathe" | 2000 | 73 | — | Non-album singles |
| "Long Way Home" | 2000 | 98 | — | Non-album singles |
| "Jam Hot" | 2001 | — | — | Non-album singles |
| "Blue Amazon" (vs Fatheads) | 2002 | — | — | Non-album singles |
| "Manmade" (vs Tom Hingley) | 2003 | — | — | Non-album singles |
| "Break the Limit" (featuring Duncan Harding) | 2003 | — | — | Non-album singles |
| "The Other Love" (vs Darren Tate) | 2004 | 84 | — | Non-album singles |
| "5000ft" | 2004 | — | — | Non-album singles |
| "Temperamental" | 2004 | — | — | Non-album singles |
"—" denotes a recording that did not chart or was not released in that territory.

== links ==
- Blue Amazon discography at Discogs
