= Cash Converters =

Australian pawnbroker

- Type: Public
- Traded as: ASX: CCV
- Industry: Diversified financials
- Founded: 1984; 42 years ago
- Founder: Brian Cumins & Partners
- Headquarters: Perth, Western Australia
- Area served: Australia; Belgium; France; Malaysia; Middle East; Netherlands; New Zealand; Portugal; Singapore; South Africa; Spain; United Kingdom
- Key people: Sam Budiselik (Managing Director)
- Products: Unsecured personal loans; Secured personal loans; Line of Credit; Second-hand retail; Second-hand luxury retail
- Revenue: AUD$429.2 million (FY 2026)
- Website: cashconverters.com; cashconverters.com.au

Cash Converters International Limited (colloquially known as Cashies) is an Australian ASX-listed, globally franchised retail and financial services company. The company specialises in the buying and selling of second-hand goods as well as providing a range of financial services including a line of credit, also known as Cashies Loan, and pawnbroking. The company is headquartered in Perth, Western Australia.

== History ==
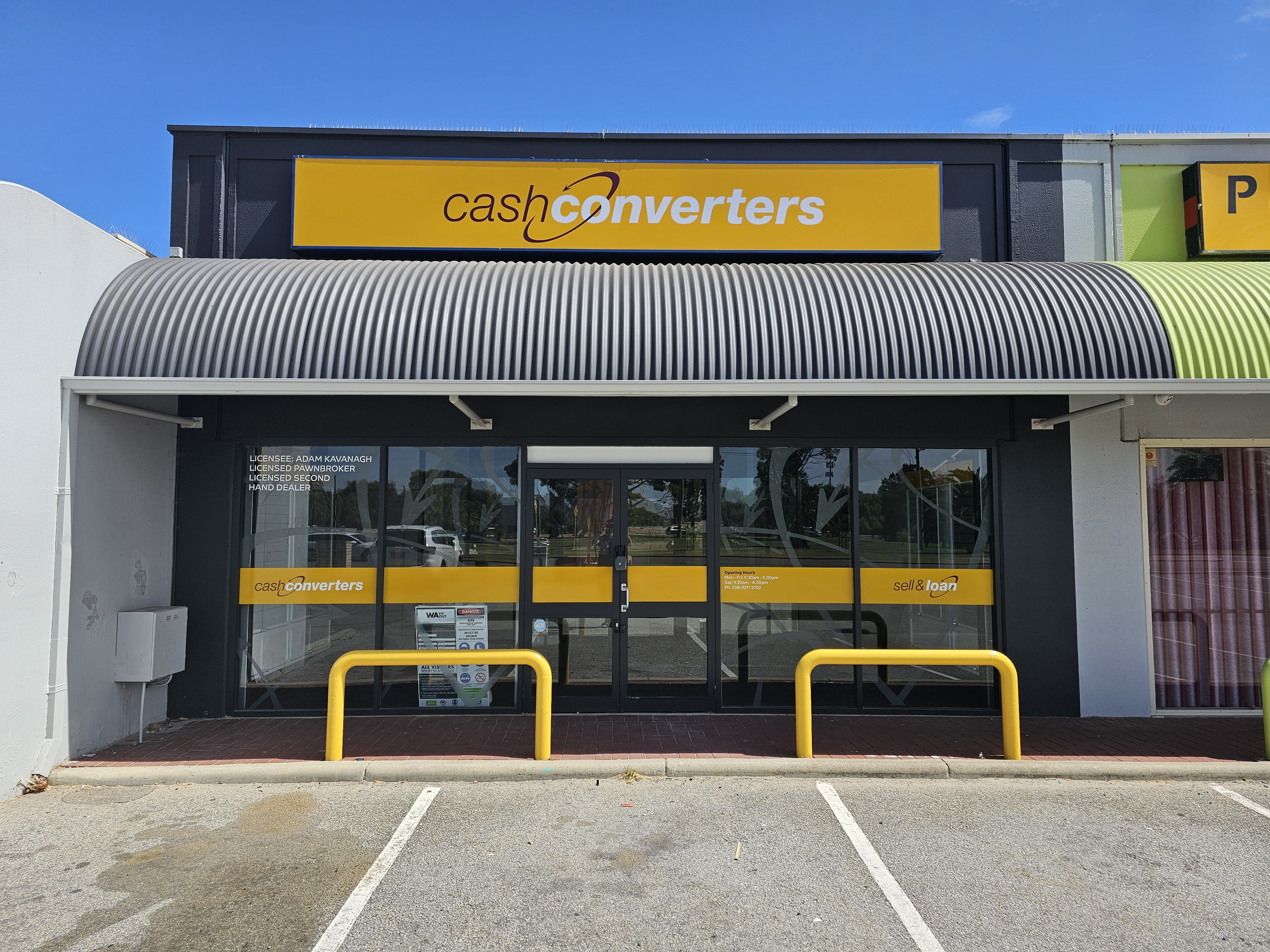
Cash Converters store in Port Kennedy, WA

Cash Converters was founded in Perth, Western Australia, in 1984 by Brian Cumins and a group of partners. Within four years, it had opened a further seven outlets across Perth, with the first two franchised outlets opened in 1988.

The company commenced its international expansion in the mid-1990s establishing operations in New Zealand, the United Kingdom, France, Belgium, Spain, South Africa, and other markets. As of 30 June 2025, Cash Converters operates 659 stores across 15 countries, with some non-Australian stores managed through master franchising agreements.

The group listed on the London Stock Exchange (LSE) in 1995 and was then granted a dual listing on the Australian Securities Exchange (ASX) in February 1997. In 2001, Cash Converters migrated its primary listing location to the ASX and subsequently delisted from the LSE on 19 February 2013 based on the composition of its share register and low trading volumes in the UK.

Cash Converters made two acquisitions in 2006. The first, Safrock Finance Corporation, was completed on 29 September for a $17.5 million and the second was financial software platform MON-E for $15 million. Both acquisitions were funded through a combination of cash and shares (scrip).

Cash Converters acquired 80% of vehicle financing company Green Light Auto in September 2013 through the conversion of a $4 million loan previously provided to the business. In November 2014, Cash Converters acquired the remaining 20% of Green Light Auto, becoming a wholly owned subsidiary. Cash Converters ceased this lending operation in June 2024.

In November 2009, EZCorp purchased a 30% stake in Cash Converters, appointing two representatives to the board of directors. Between dividend reinvestments and a rights issue in 2018, EZCorp increased its ownership to 36% on 30 June 2021.

The company gained significantly more online fame after Adelaide-based YouTuber Dankpods started sharing videos of his visits to several Cash Converters locations in an ongoing series of “Cashies Specials”. The first of these was posted in 2020.

Cash Converters made significant acquisitions in 2022. The company purchased the remaining stake in its New Zealand operations for $13.7 million, which includes 11 corporate stores and rights to franchise fees from 11 additional stores, making it a fully owned subsidiary.

Cash Converters purchased its largest UK franchise store network, Capital Cash, for $24.7 million in 2023.

== Products and services ==
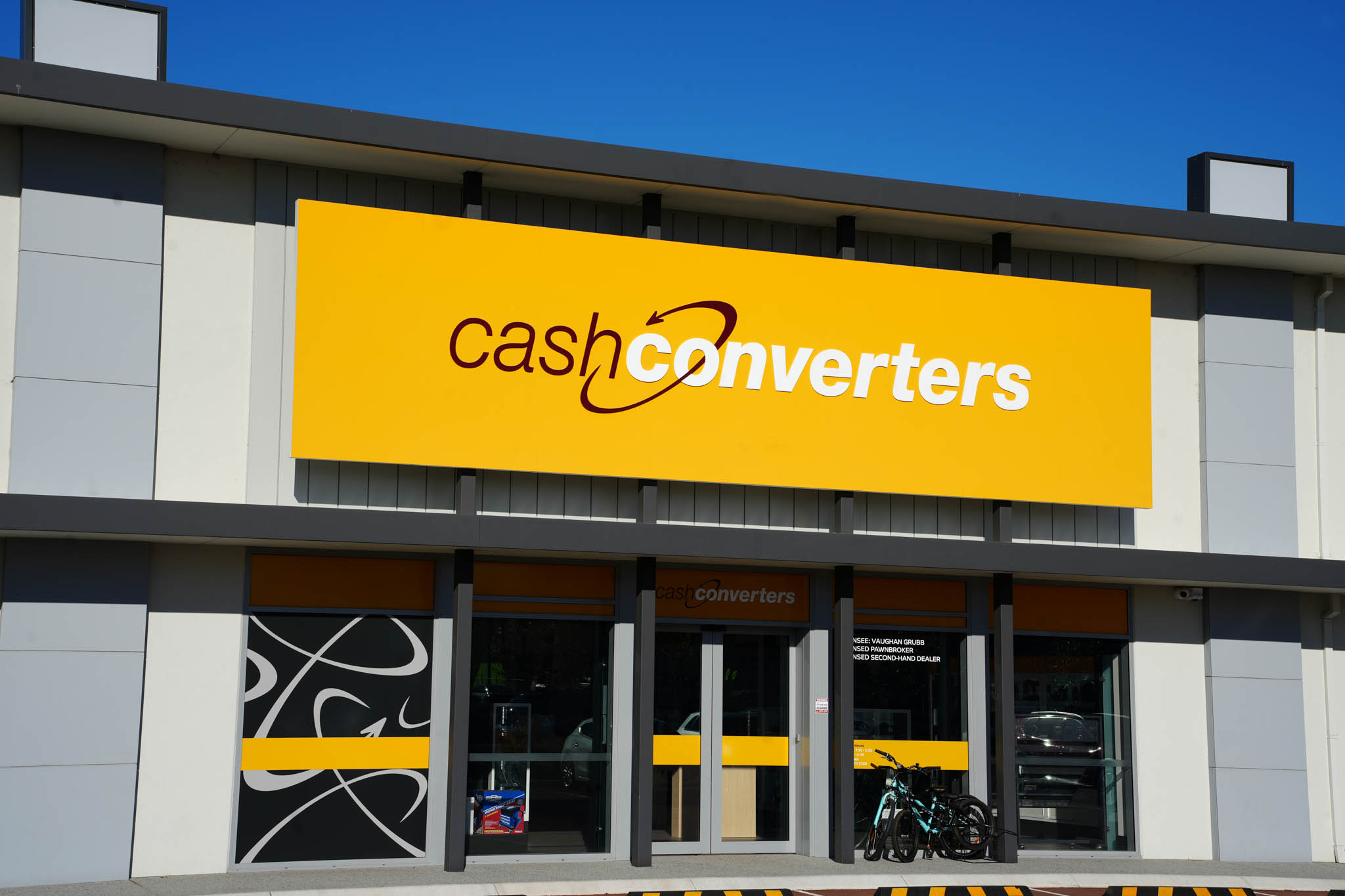
Cash Converters store in Ellenbrook, WA

Cash Converters operates retail stores that buy and sell second-hand goods and offer pawnbroking services. The company also provides short-term personal loans. As of June 2024, the franchise network included 532 stores globally, with 74 in Australia.

In May 2025, the company announced they would exit the small amount credit contract (SACC) market in October 2025 following increased regulatory scrutiny of payday lending.

In the 2024 fiscal year, the company's Australian stores sold 1.7 million pre-owned goods.

== Lawsuits and infringements ==
Two class actions were launched in the Federal Court of Australia alleging that Cash Converters charged excessive interest on short-term loans in New South Wales between July 2010 and June 2013. Over 50,000 customers joined to seek $40 million in damages. A $23 million in-principle settlement was reached with more than 37,000 Cash Converters customers in June 2015.

In 2016, an Australian Securities & Investments Commission (ASIC) investigation found that Cash Converters had failed to make reasonable inquiries into the income and expenses of customers availing their small amount loan product. They were ordered to pay back $10.8 million to consumers and fined a further $1.35 million in addition to entering an enforceable undertaking to uplift its risk, compliance and loan application assessment processes.

In May 2018, Cash Converters reached a settlement with ASIC relating to debt collections practices between 2013 and March 2016 resulting in a payment of $650,000 to the National Debt Helpline and the outsourcing of debt collection activity to a third-party, Collections House Limited, which was completed by 30 June 2018. In 2021, Cash Converters recommenced its own debt collection activity after receiving ASIC approval.

Cash Converters made the final class-action settlement payment relating to historic lending practices at some point before September 2020.
