= Carol Leeming =

British writer and singer (born 1957)

Carol Leeming MBE FRSA
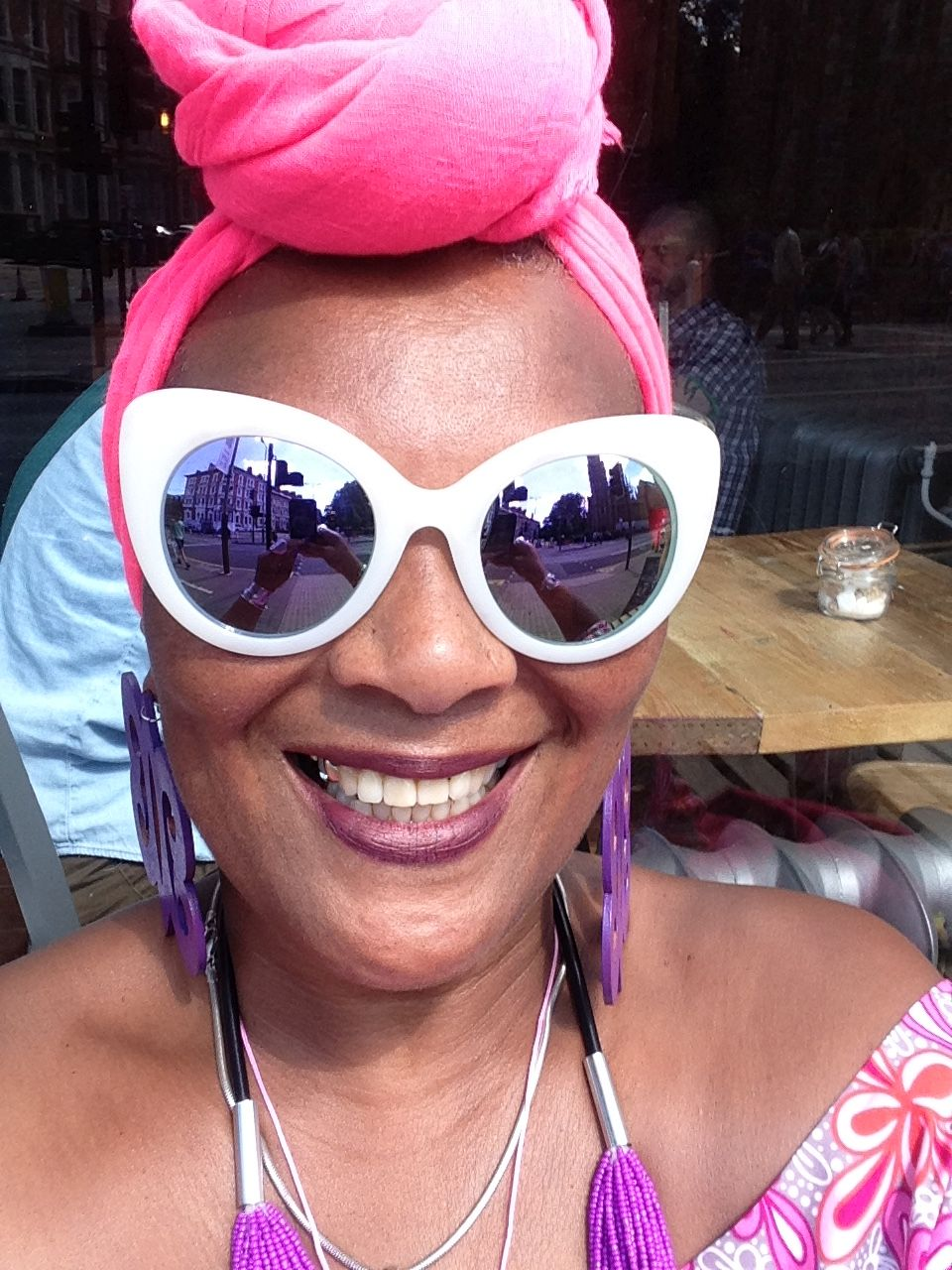
- Carol Leeming 2025
- Born: 27 November 1957 (age 68); Leicester, UK
- Occupations: artist, musician

Carolann Coleen Leeming (born 27 November 1957) is a British and Jamaican descent multi-disciplinary artist, writer, singer, poet and musician who is noted for her poetry, plays and musical work. She is best known for her choreopoetry. Leeming's literary work features in The Cambridge Companion to British Black & Asian Literature, 1945–2010.

== Early life ==
Carol Leeming was born in Leicester, England, to parents from Jamaica and Antigua, who immigrated to the United Kingdom as part of the Windrush generation of the 1950s. Leeming grew up in Leicester, where she attended Alderman Newtons Grammar School (sometimes known as Alderman Newton's School), and grew up partly in Kingston Jamaica. Later, in the 1980s, Leeming graduated at De Montfort University (DMU) – then called Leicester Polytechnic – where she was honoured in February 2019 as DMU "Alumna of the month".

== Career ==
Leeming was a BBC Proms Open Music trainee for the Dream Proms 2022 at the Royal Albert Hall.

Leeming was a Royal Literary Fund Reading Round Lector (a group leader) in 2013. Leeming is a member of Writers Mosaic (a division of the Royal Literary Fund).

Leeming is featured in Writers Mosaic from The Royal Literary Fund Reading Round Lector (a group leader).

In 2017, Leeming was awarded by Women in Management UK, the East Midlands Women's Awards for Women in Art, Media and Music. In 2013, Leeming was an elected Fellow of the Royal Society of Arts according to a letter sent to her by the RSA.

In 2021/2022, Leeming was a BBC Open Music Trainee.

Leeming was awarded an honorary doctorate by Loughborough University in 2025.

Leeming runs a poetry event every month called 'Bodacious.'

== Discography ==
Leeming has performed music as part of the groups Quadelectronic and Qwire. Leeming's recordings include singles, extended plays, albums, compilations, and mixes.

== Honours and awards ==
In 2019, she was appointed an MBE for her work as a poet and playwright and her contribution to Leicester arts and culture. Leeming the Penfold Media Award for the Enchanter film poem. In 2017, she was given the Ena Young Poetry Award.

Leeming was featured in songs by the British House music Studio project group Staxx of Joy.

Leeming was awarded an honorary doctorate for her contribution to British arts, equity, education and community empowerment.
