= List of Billboard number-one dance singles of 1997 =

Billboard magazine compiled the top-performing dance singles in the United States during 1997 on two Hot Dance Music charts: the Club Play and the Maxi-Singles Sales. Premiered in 1976, the Club Play chart ranked the most-played singles on dance club based on reports from a national sample of club DJs. The Maxi-Singles Sales chart was launched in 1985 to compile the best-selling dance singles based on retail sales across the United States.

== Charts history ==
Chart history
Issue date	Hot Dance Music/Club Play		Hot Dance Music/Maxi-Singles Sales		Ref.
Issue date	Song	Artist(s)	Song	Artist(s)	Ref.
January 4	"Un-Break My Heart"	Toni Braxton	"Un-Break My Heart"	Toni Braxton	
January 11	"Un-Break My Heart"	Toni Braxton	"Un-Break My Heart"	Toni Braxton	
January 18	"No One Can Love You More Than Me"	Hannah Jones	"Un-Break My Heart"	Toni Braxton	
January 25	"Blue Skies"	BT featuring Tori Amos	"Un-Break My Heart"	Toni Braxton	
February 1	"The Boss"	The Braxtons	"Un-Break My Heart"	Toni Braxton	
February 8	"Get Up"	Byron Stingily	"Un-Break My Heart"	Toni Braxton	
February 15	"Never Miss the Water"	Chaka Khan featuring Meshell Ndegeocello	"Un-Break My Heart"	Toni Braxton	
February 22	"Don't Cry for Me Argentina"	Madonna	"Discotheque"	U2	
March 1	"Run Away"	Nuyorican Soul featuring India	"Don't Cry for Me Argentina"	Madonna	
March 8	"Insomnia"	Faithless	"Can't Nobody Hold Me Down"	Puff Daddy (Featuring Mase)	
March 15	"Insomnia"	Faithless	"Can't Nobody Hold Me Down"	Puff Daddy (Featuring Mase)	
March 22	"Discotheque"	U2	"Can't Nobody Hold Me Down"	Puff Daddy (Featuring Mase)	
March 29	"Discotheque"	U2	"Can't Nobody Hold Me Down"	Puff Daddy (Featuring Mase)	
April 5	"People Hold On"	Lisa Stansfield	"Can't Nobody Hold Me Down"	Puff Daddy (Featuring Mase)	
April 12	"Give It Up"	Victor Calderone	"Can't Nobody Hold Me Down"	Puff Daddy (Featuring Mase)	
April 19	"Star People '97"	George Michael	"A Little Bit of Ecstasy"	Jocelyn Enriquez	
April 26	"Havana"	Kenny G	"A Little Bit of Ecstasy"	Jocelyn Enriquez	
May 3	"To Step Aside"	Pet Shop Boys	"A Little Bit of Ecstasy"	Jocelyn Enriquez	
May 10	"That Sound"	Pump Friction	"A Little Bit of Ecstasy"	Jocelyn Enriquez	
May 17	"Da Funk"	Daft Punk	"A Little Bit of Ecstasy"	Jocelyn Enriquez	
May 24	"I Miss You"	Björk	"A Little Bit of Ecstasy"	Jocelyn Enriquez	
May 31	"Not Over Yet"	Grace	"Step Into A World (Rapture's Delight)"	KRS-One	
June 7	"Fable"	Robert Miles	"Step Into A World (Rapture's Delight)"	KRS-One	
June 14	"Love Is All We Need"	Mary J. Blige	"I'll Be Missing You"	Puff Daddy & Faith Evans (Feat. 112)	
June 21	"It's No Good"	Depeche Mode	"I'll Be Missing You"	Puff Daddy & Faith Evans (Feat. 112)	
June 28	"It Must Be Love"	Robin S.	"I'll Be Missing You"	Puff Daddy & Faith Evans (Feat. 112)	
July 5	"Free"	Ultra Naté	"I'll Be Missing You"	Puff Daddy & Faith Evans (Feat. 112)	
July 12	"Free"	Ultra Naté	"I'll Be Missing You"	Puff Daddy & Faith Evans (Feat. 112)	
July 19	"I Don't Want To"	Toni Braxton	"I'll Be Missing You"	Puff Daddy & Faith Evans (Feat. 112)	
July 26	"Something Goin' On"	Todd Terry presents Martha Wash and Jocelyn Brown	"I'll Be Missing You"	Puff Daddy & Faith Evans (Feat. 112)	
August 2	"The Way"	Funky Green Dogs	"I'll Be Missing You"	Puff Daddy & Faith Evans (Feat. 112)	
August 9	"Encore Une Fois"	Sash!	"I'll Be Missing You"	Puff Daddy & Faith Evans (Feat. 112)	
August 16	"Around the World"	Daft Punk	"Mo Money Mo Problems"	The Notorious B.I.G. Featuring Puff Daddy & Mase	
August 23	"Din Daa Daa"	Kevin Aviance	"Mo Money Mo Problems"	The Notorious B.I.G. Featuring Puff Daddy & Mase	
August 30	"This Man"	Kellee	"I'll Be Missing You"	Puff Daddy & Faith Evans (Feat. 112)	
September 6	"Things Just Ain't the Same"	Deborah Cox	"I'll Be Missing You"	Puff Daddy & Faith Evans (Feat. 112)	
September 13	"Hello"	Poe	"Honey"	Mariah Carey	
September 20	"When You Talk About Love"	Patti LaBelle	"Honey"	Mariah Carey	
September 27	"Show Me"	Urban Soul	"Honey"	Mariah Carey	
October 4	"Salva Mea"	Faithless	"Honey"	Mariah Carey	
October 11	"Get Up, Stand Up"	Phunky Phantom	"You Make Me Wanna..."	Usher	
October 18	"Honey"	Mariah Carey	"You Make Me Wanna..."	Usher	
October 25	"Never, Never Gonna Give You Up"	Lisa Stansfield	"You Make Me Wanna..."	Usher	
November 1	"So in Love with You"	Duke	"You Make Me Wanna..."	Usher	
November 8	"Run to You"	Joi Cardwell	"You Make Me Wanna..."	Usher	
November 15	"Ain't No Need to Hide"	Sandy B	"You Make Me Wanna..."	Usher	
November 22	"James Bond Theme (Moby's re-version)"	Moby	"It's Raining Men...The Sequel"	Martha Wash Featuring Rupaul	
November 29	"Turn Me Out (Turn to Sugar)"	Praxis featuring Kathy Brown	"What About Us"	Total	
December 6	"Drama"	Club 69 featuring Kim Cooper	"Free"	Ultra Naté	
December 13	"Ecuador"	Sash!	"It's All About The Benjamins" / "Been Around The World"	Puff Daddy & The Family	
December 20	"Chelsea Press 2"	Dat Oven	"Together Again"	Janet jackson	
December 27	"Never Gonna Fall"	Lisa Stansfield	"Roxanne '97 - Puff Daddy Remix"	Sting & The Police	

== See also ==
- 1997 in music
- List of Billboard Hot 100 number ones of 1997
