= Love Tribe =

Music Studio Group

Love Tribe is a house music studio group assembled by producers Dewey Bullock, Latanza Waters and Victor Mitchell. Their biggest success came in 1996 when their track "Stand Up" reached #1 on the U.S. Hot Dance Club Play chart. It reached #23 in the UK Singles Chart in July that year. Their only other chart single was a remix of their first - in 2001 "Stand Up" hit #5 after it was reworked by Thunderpuss.

== See also ==
- List of number-one dance hits (United States)
- List of artists who reached number one on the US Dance chart
