= Thunderpuss (album) =

Compilation album by Thunderpuss
- Released: 19 March 2002
- Recorded: 2002
- Genre: Tribal house
- Length: 73:08
- Label: Tommy Boy Records
- Producer: Barry Harris, Chris Cox

Thunderpuss chronology
Thunderpuss (2002)	Dancemania 20 (2002)

Thunderpuss is a compilation album mixed by DJs and producers Barry Harris and Chris Cox, better known under the moniker Thunderpuss. Released in 2002, it comprises their remixes of other artists' work as well as their own music.

Billboard remarked about the album, "There’s nothing subtle about Thunderpuss’ hard-driving style, which is heavy on vocals and pounding rhythm tracks but leaves melody lines intact."

== Track listing ==
1. Madonna - Don't Tell Me (Thunderpuss Anthem)
2. We Are Family All Stars - We Are Family (Thunderpuss Club Mix)
3. LeAnn Rimes - Can't Fight the Moonlight (Thunderpuss Club Mix)
4. Suzanne Palmer - Hide U (Thunderpuss Tribe-A-Pella)
5. Enrique Iglesias - Hero (Thunderpuss Club Mix)
6. Thunderpuss feat. Thea Austin - First Class Freak (Thunderpuss Club Mix)
7. Peter Rauhofer and Pet Shop Boys=The Collaboration - Break 4 Love (Friburn & Urik Tribal mix)
8. Kim English - Everyday (Hex Hector and Mac Quayle Mix)
9. Barry Harris feat. Pepper Mashay - I Got My Pride (Original Mix)
10. Pusaka presents Thea Austin - I'm Addicted (You're The Worst Thing For Me) (Club Anthem)
11. Rosabel with Jennifer Holliday - And I Am Telling You I'm Not Going (Attitude Mix)
12. Thunderpuss feat. Latanza Waters - Stand Up (Thunderpuss Club Mix)
13. Kristine W - Clubland (ThunderDUB)
14. Barry Harris feat. Pepper Mashay - Dive In The Pool (Wayne G's Circuit Anthem Mix)
15. Britney Spears - Don't Let Me Be The Last To Know (Thunderpuss Club Mix)
