= Vida!... =

Studio album by Kon Kan
- Released: 1993
- Studio: Naked Steel Studio (Hamilton, Canada) and Beun Living Room Studio (Toronto, Canada), 1993
- Genre: Pop rock; dance; house ("Sinful Wishes" (Dance Mix) & "In Silk")
- Length: 48:12
- Label: Hypnotic Records
- Producer: Barry Harris; Tom Gerenscer; Seri Gee

Kon Kan chronology
| Syntonic (1990) | Vida!... (1993) |

Vida!... is the third album by Kon Kan, released only in Canada in 1993 by Hypnotic Records (a subsidiary of A&M Records).

Two singles were released from the album: "Sinful Wishes" and "S.O.L.", the latter a collaboration with Crash Morgan (who died in 1995 after suffering a heart attack on stage whilst performing with the Canadian rock band Big Sugar).

"Moonage Daydream" is a cover version of the David Bowie song, from his album The Rise and Fall of Ziggy Stardust and the Spiders from Mars.

"Move to Move (Revisited)" is an updated version of "Move to Move" from Kon Kan's first album, Move to Move.

"January Man" features Coney Hatch guitarist Carl Dixon on mandolin.

Barry Harris and drummer Anton Cook later reunited in the band Sick Seconds in 2011. They released their self-titled debut album Sick Seconds, in March 2013.

In April 2020, Harris re-released Vida!... worldwide digitally with additional previously unreleased remixes.

== Track listing ==
All tracks are written by Barry Harris and Bob Mitchell, except where noted.

| No. | Title | Writer(s) | Length |
|---|---|---|---|
| 1. | "The Introdome" | Harris | 0:30 |
| 2. | "Sinful Wishes" | | 4:20 |
| 3. | "Mr. Fleming" | | 4:43 |
| 4. | "Should've Known Me (Better Than That)" | | 3:15 |
| 5. | "Moonage Daydream" (David Bowie cover) | David Bowie | 5:38 |
| 6. | "Move to Move" (Revisited) | | 4:52 |
| 7. | "January Man" | | 4:46 |
| 8. | "S.O.L." | Harris; Mitchell; Crash Morgan | 4:11 |
| 9. | "Sinful Wishes" (dance mix) | | 4:27 |
| 10. | "In Silk" | Harris | 5:14 |
| 11. | "When Hope Is Gone" | Harris | 6:16 |
| Total length: | | | 48:12 |

== Personnel ==
- Barry Harris – lead vocals, keyboards, acoustic guitar, bass guitar
- Anton Cook - drums
- Mark Santers - drums (on "Sinful Wishes")
- Michael Hampson - lead guitar, acoustic guitar
- Seri Gee - keyboards, backing vocals, string arrangements
- Lorrie Tice - vocals
- Danny Leblanc - keyboards (on "S.O.L." and "January Man")
- Carl Dixon - mandolin (on "January Man")
