= Thunderpuss =

American remix/production team

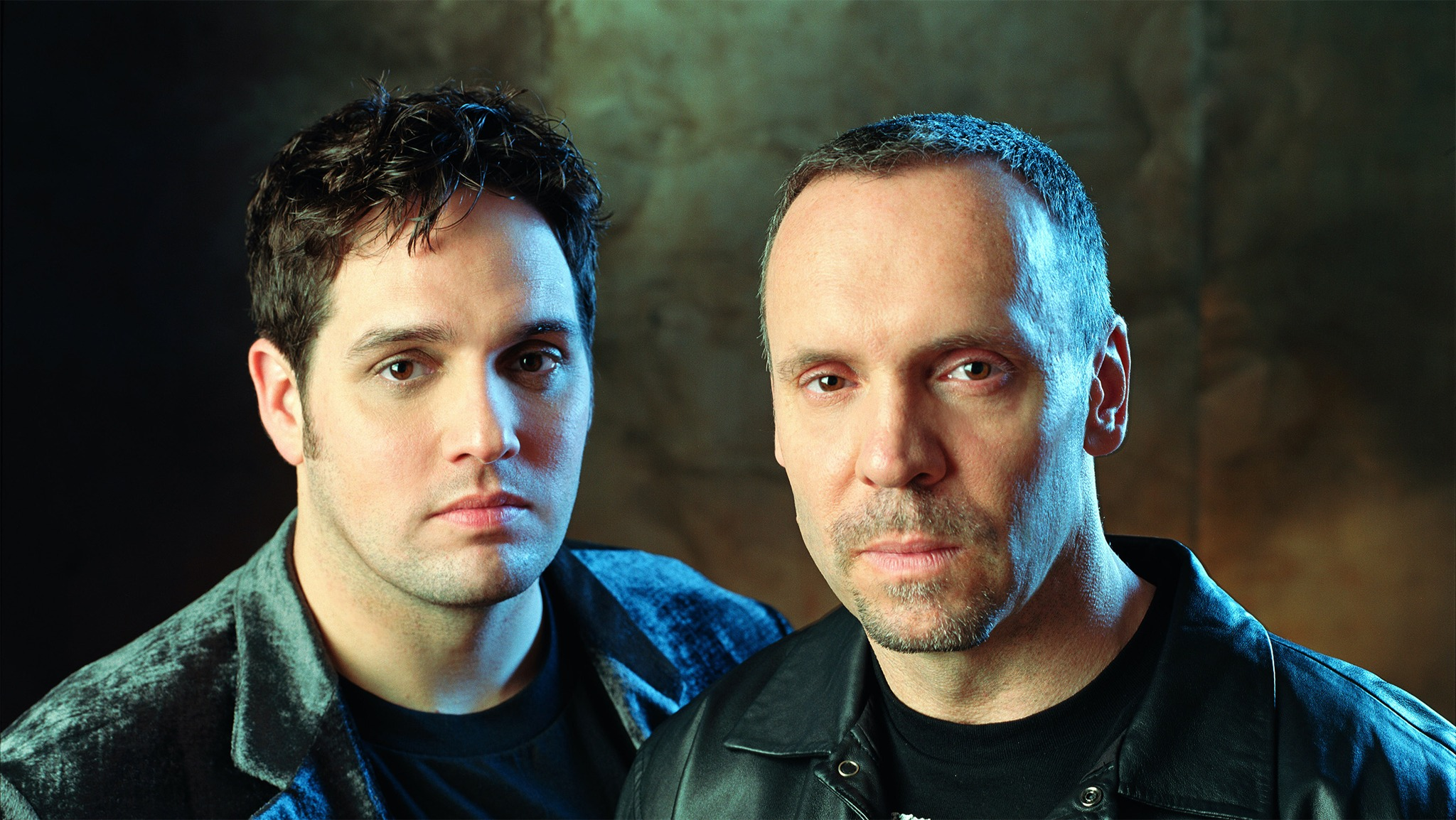
- Thunderpuss - L -Chris Cox, R- Barry Harris

Background information
- Genres: House, tribal house, dance
- Years active: 1997–2003, 2022–Present
- Label: Tommy Boy (1997–2003)
- Members: Barry Harris; Chris Cox

Thunderpuss is the (mainly dance) remix/production team of Los Angeles–based music producers Barry Harris and Chris Cox. Harris had previously worked as part of several music groups including Kon Kan, Top Kat, Killer Bunnies and Outta Control and had also released several solo singles himself. Cox, a musician and DJ, had also worked for years as a DJ and producer, producing a megamix of Paula Abdul songs, among other things, and started his own record label, Interhit Records, with Jeff Johnson.

== History ==
Harris and Cox originally met in New York City in 1990 while Harris was recording Syntonic, Kon Kan's second album. They became friends and remained in contact for years, with Harris eventually joining Cox at Interhit Records in Los Angeles in January 1998. They did not start working together as a production team until September 1997. Their first project as Thunderpuss was a cover of the song "I Just Wanna Be Your Everything", with Thea Austin, formerly of Snap!, performing vocals. They also produced Engelbert Humperdinck's 1998 album The Dance Album, but did not use the name Thunderpuss. They also produced original songs for various artists, including Abigail ("Let the Joy Rise" and "If It Don't Fit"), Amber ("Taste the Tears") and Soluna. During this time, they also released remix singles under the name 'Thunderpuss 2000', most notably covers of David Bowie's "Heroes" and Blue Öyster Cult's "Godzilla".

Over the course of six years (1998–2003), Thunderpuss were in demand as remixers, their first work together being a remix of Billie Myers' "Kiss the Rain" in 1998. Their breakout success was a hit re-working of "It's Not Right but It's Okay" by Whitney Houston. This was quickly followed by a remix of "Sexual (La Di Di)" by Amber, a hit in 1999. Other artists who received the remix treatment included Madonna, Britney Spears, Christina Aguilera, Janet Jackson, Jennifer Lopez, Shakira, NSYNC, and Celine Dion.

Thunderpuss themselves also put out several later singles as artists, including "Papa's Got a Brand New Pigbag", a fully electronic dance cover of the Pigbag song which reached number 3 in the UK Singles Chart in April 1982, "Stand Up" (with Latanza Waters) and "FMH" (under the artist name Harris & Cox).

Thunderpuss went their separate ways in July 2003. Chris Cox continues to produce, remix and DJ around the world. Barry Harris also returned to producing & DJing, creating dance remixes of tracks for PINK, Ariana Grande, Justin Bieber, Chainsmokers, Beyoncé, Taylor Swift, Todrick Hall, Adele, Calvin Harris, Rihanna, Justin Timberlake, Ellie Goulding, Meghan Trainor and Sia, among others.

Thunderpuss reformed in 2022 to remix "Don't Cry For Me" by Whitney Houston, and have been doing nightclub and festival appearances around the United States.

== Discography ==
=== Albums ===
- Thunderpuss (2002)
- Dancemania 20 (2002)
- MTV Party to Go Remixed (2001)

=== Singles ===
- "I Just Want to be Your Everything" (feat. Thea Austin) (1998)
- "Heroes" (1998)
- "Godzilla" (1998)
- "Papa's Got A Brand New Pigbag" (2001)
- "So Fabulous, So Fierce (Freak Out)" (feat. Jocelyn Enriquez) (2001)
- "I'm Addicted (You're the Worst Thing for Me)" (Pusaka feat. Thea Austin) (2001)
- "Stand Up" (feat. Latanza Waters) (2001)
- "FMH" (as Harris & Cox) (2002)
- "Six Feet Under" (with Widelife) (2002)
- "First Class Freak" (with Thea Austin) (2002)
- "Head" (Thunderpuss & Barnes) (2003)

=== Productions ===
- Engelbert Humperdinck – Quando Quando Quando (1999)
- Fisher – Any Way (2000)
- Fisher – I Will Love Again (2000)
- Fox Sports – Fox Sports Football Theme (1999)
- Gina G – Stuck On You (2000)
- Soluna – Monday Mi Amor (2002)
- Sonique – Love Is On Our Side (2000)
- Sonique – Sky (2000)
- Sonique – Love Washes Away (2003)
- Sonique – Magic (Chris Cox production) (2003)
- Vicious Flowerz – Truly Madly Deeply (1998)
- Valeria – If You Feel The Night

=== Remixography ===
- Aaliyah – "Got To Give It Up"
- Abigail – "If It Don't Fit"
- Abigail – "Let the Joy Rise"
- Amber – "Above the Clouds"
- Amber – "Sexual (La Di Di)"
- Amber – "Taste the Tears"
- Amber – "The Need to Be Naked"
- Anastacia – "Boom"
- Anastacia – "Love is a Crime"
- Ann Nesby – "Lovin' is Really My Game"
- Ayumi Hamasaki – "Surreal"
- Ayumi Hamasaki – "Trauma"
- Backstreet Boys – "The Call"
- Billie Myers – "Kiss the Rain"
- Blenders – "(I Am In Love With The) McDonald's Girl"
- Blonde Ambition – "Live to Tell"
- BoA – "Amazing Kiss"
- Bob Sinclar – "Freedom"
- Boomkat – "The Wreckoning"
- Brian McKnight – "Still"
- Britney Spears – "Don't Let Me Be The Last To Know"
- Britney Spears – "I'm a Slave 4 U"
- Britney Spears – "I'm Not a Girl, Not Yet a Woman"
- Britney Spears – "Sometimes"
- Brooke Allison – "The Kiss-Off (Goodbye)"
- Celine Dion – "I Want You to Need Me"
- Charlotte Church – "Tonight"
- Cher – "Song for the Lonely"
- Christina Aguilera – "I Turn to You"
- Christina Aguilera – "The Christmas Song (Chestnuts Roasting on an Open Fire)"
- Christina Aguilera – "What a Girl Wants"
- Christina Aguilera, Pink, Mýa and Lil' Kim – "Lady Marmalade"
- Chumbawamba – "Amnesia"
- Cooler Kids – "Morning Star"
- David Tyler Martin – "Some Kind of Wonderful"
- Deni Hines – "I Like the Way"
- Dollshead – "New Creation"
- Donna Summer – "Love Is the Healer"
- Duke – "Greater"
- Engelbert Humperdinck – "Release Me"/"Gotta Get Release"
- Enrique Iglesias – "Be With You"
- Enrique Iglesias – "Escape"
- Enrique Iglesias – "Hero"
- Eurythmics – "17 Again"
- Garou – "Gitan"
- Geoffrey Oryema – "Omera John (My Brother John)"
- Gerardo – "Americana"
- Gerardo – "Ta Cañon"
- Gloria Estefan – "Out of Nowhere"
- GTS feat. Loleatta Holloway – "Share My Joy"
- Hilary Duff – "So Yesterday"
- Instant Funk – "I Got My Mind Made Up"
- Inaya Day – "Can't Stop Dancin'"
- Janet Jackson – "All for You"
- Jennifer Holliday – "A Woman's Got the Power"
- Jennifer Holliday – "Think It Over"
- Jennifer Lopez – "Alive"
- Jennifer Lopez – "Feelin' So Good"
- Jennifer Lopez – "Play"
- Jocelyn Enriquez – "When I Get Close to You"
- Jordan Hill – "Baby Love"
- Kim English – "Higher Things"
- Kina – "Girl from the Gutter"
- Kina – "Me"
- Kristine W – "Clubland"
- Kumi Koda – "Trust Your Love"
- Lara Fabian – "I Will Love Again"
- LeAnn Rimes – "Can't Fight the Moonlight"
- LeAnn Rimes – "Tic Toc"
- Linda Imperial – "Where the Boys Are"
- Louchie Lou & Michie One – "Body Rock"
- Luther Vandross – "Can Heaven Wait"
- Madonna – "Die Another Day"
- Madonna – "Don't Tell Me"
- Madonna – "GHV2 Megamix"
- Madonna – "What It Feels Like for a Girl"
- Mandy Moore – "In My Pocket"
- Martay & ZZ Top – "Gimme All Your Lovin' 2000"
- Mary Griffin – "We Can Get There"
- Mary J. Blige – "No More Drama"
- Mary J. Blige feat. Ja Rule – "Rainy Dayz"
- Mirwais – "Disco Science"
- Mylène Farmer – "Désenchantée"
- 'N Sync – "Bye Bye Bye"
- Nobody's Angel – "If You Wanna Dance"
- Outsiderz 4 Life – "Who R U"
- Pet Shop Boys – "New York City Boy"
- Play – "I Must Not Chase the Boys"
- Shakira – "Ready for the Good Times"
- Shakira – "Underneath Your Clothes"
- Shalim – "Nadie Como Tu"/"Lost Inside of You"
- Shalim – "Entregate"
- Shannon – "Thunderpuss Megamix"
- Spice Girls – "Tell Me Why"
- Stacie Orrico – "Stuck"
- Steve Best – "The Way You Want It"
- Suzanne Palmer – "Hide U"
- Tamia – "Stranger in My House"
- Tamia – "Tell Me Who"
- Taylor Dayne – "Naked Without You"
- The Tamperer feat. Maya – "If You Buy This Record (Your Life Will Be Better)"
- TRF – "Silver & Gold Dance"
- Ultra Naté – "Desire"
- We Are Family Foundation – "We Are Family"
- Whitney Houston – "It's Not Right But It's Okay"
- Whitney Houston – "My Love Is Your Love"
- Whitney Houston – "Try It On My Own"
- Whitney Houston – "Whatchulookinat"
- Whitney Houston & Deborah Cox – "Same Script, Different Cast"
- Whitney Houston – "Don't Cry For Me"
- Zoë Birkett – "Treat Me Like a Lady"

== See also ==
- List of number-one dance hits (United States)
- List of artists who reached number one on the U.S. dance chart
