= Stand Up (Love Tribe song) =

Single by Love Tribe
- Released: 1996
- Recorded: 1996
- Genre: House
- Length: 3:12
- Label: DV8 (US); AM:PM/A&M (International)
- Songwriters: Dewey Bullock; Latanza Waters; Victor Mitchell
- Producers: Dewey Bullock; Victor Mitchell

"Stand Up" is a song written and originally recorded in 1996 by the American house music studio group Love Tribe, featuring American dance singer Latanza Waters. The original version, notable for using the keyboard sampling from Machine's 1979 disco hit "There But for the Grace of God Go I", became their only chart-topper on Billboard's Dance Club Songs chart, reaching number one on August 31, 1996, for a one-week stay, as well as a number 89 placement on the Hot 100 chart in January 1997. It reached No. 23 on the UK Singles Chart in July that same year.

== 1996 release ==
=== Original mixes ===
1. "Stand Up (Narcotic Mix)"
2. "Stand Up (Dub-Alicious)"
3. "Stand Up (Tribe Vibe)"
4. "Stand Up (Wildchild Renagade Dub)"
5. "Stand Up (Anthemlicious Mix)"
6. "Stand Up (Love and Happiness Mix)"
7. "Stand Up (Narcotic Dub)"
8. "Stand Up (Slam Dub)"

=== US mixes ===
1. "Stand Up (Narcotic Edit)" - 3:12
2. "Stand Up (Alcatraz Robs the Edit)" - 3:52
3. "Stand Up (Narcotic Mix)" - 8:39
4. "Stand Up (Alcatraz Robs the Bank)" - 8:56
5. "Stand Up (Anthemlicious Mix)" - 7:56

== Thunderpuss version ==
"Stand Up"

Single by Thunderpuss Versus Latanza Waters
- Released: 2001
- Recorded: 2001
- Genre: House
- Length: 3:58
- Label: Tommy Boy Silver
- Songwriters: Dewey Bullock; Latanza Waters; Victor Mitchell
- Producers: Barry Harris; Chris Cox

In 2001, Canadian/American duo Thunderpuss released their version of "Stand Up" which again featured Waters on vocals. Their version peaked at number five on Billboard's Dance Club Songs chart that same year.

=== Track listing ===
1. "Stand Up (E-Smoove Radio Edit)" - 3:23
2. "Stand Up (Thunderpuss Radio Edit)" - 3:58
3. "Stand Up (Thunderpuss Club Mix)" - 8:14

== Dirty Werk version ==
"Stand Up"

Single by Dirty Werk
- Released: May 25, 2018
- Recorded: 2018
- Genre: Dance, house
- Length: 3:24
- Label: Fly House/Dirty Werk Recordings
- Songwriters: Dewey Bullock; Latanza Waters; Victor Mitchell
- Producers: Steven George Stanula; David John Boenzi

In 2018, American duo Dirty Werk released an electro dance version of "Stand Up" which became their first number one on the Billboard Dance Club Songs chart on September 22, 2018.

=== Track listing ===
==== Stand Up (download mixes) ====
1. "Stand Up (Nick Rockwell Extended Remix)"
2. "Stand Up (Nick Rockwell Radio Mix)"
3. "Stand Up (Scotty Boy & Luca Debonaire Extended Remix)"
4. "Stand Up (Scotty Boy & Luca Debonaire Radio Edit)"
5. "Stand Up (Lodato And Joseph Duveen Extended Remix)"
6. "Stand Up (Freshcobar And Lavelle Dupree Extended Remix)"
7. "Stand Up (Freshcobar & Lavelle Dupree Extended Remix)"
8. "Stand Up (Freshcobar & Lavelle Dupree Radio Edit)"
9. "Stand Up (Lodato & Joseph Duveen Extended Remix)"
10. "Stand Up (Lodato & Joseph Duveen Radio Edit)"
