= Move to Move (song) =

Single by Kon Kan

from the album Move to Move
- Released: 1989
- Genre: Synth-pop
- Length: 3:59
- Label: Atlantic
- Songwriters: Barry Harris, Bob Mitchell
- Producers: Barry Harris, Jon Lind

Kon Kan singles chronology
"Puss n' Boots/These Boots (Are Made for Walking)" (1989)	"Move to Move" (1989)	"Liberty!" (1990)

"Move to Move" is a song by Kon Kan, released as the fourth single from their 1989 debut album Move to Move. The song peaked at No. 84 in Canada.

"Move to Move" was re-recorded for the 1993 album Vida!..., titled as "Move to Move (Revisited)". This version has more of a rock sound than the original synthpop version.

== Charts ==
Chart (1989)	Peak position
Canada (RPM Top 100)	84
