= Harry Houdini (song) =

Single by Kon Kan

from the album Move to Move
- Released: 1989
- Length: 3:49
- Label: Atlantic
- Songwriter: Barry Harris
- Producers: Barry Harris, Jon Lind

Kon Kan singles chronology
"I Beg Your Pardon" (1988)	"Harry Houdini" (1989)	"Puss N' Boots/These Boots Are Made for Walkin'" (1989)

Audio
- "Harry Houdini" on YouTube

"Harry Houdini" (titled as "Arts in 'D' Minor/Harry Houdini" on the album) is Kon Kan, released as the second single from their 1989 debut album Move to Move. The song did not match the success of their previous single "I Beg Your Pardon", managing to just scrape into the top forty in their native Canada at No. 39 and peaking at No. 88 in the UK, although it was a bigger hit in New Zealand, where it reached No. 14 in September 1989.

The song contains a sample of "White Lines" by Grandmaster Melle Mel and a vocal interpolation of Blondie's "The Tide Is High".

== Charts ==
Chart (1989)	Peak position
Canada (RPM)	39
New Zealand Singles Chart	14
US 12-inch Singles Sales (Billboard)	33
UK Singles Chart (OCC)	88
