= That Sound =

That Sound may refer to:

- "That Sound" (Pump Friction song), 1997
- "That Sound" (Sam Fender song), 2018
- "That Sound", a song by Michael Moog, 2000
