= Get Up =

Get Up may refer to:

== Film and television ==
- Get Up! (film), a 2003 Japanese film directed by Kazuyuki Izutsu
- Get Up (film), a 2008 South Korean television film directed by Lee Jae-dong
- Get Up (TV program), a 2018 American morning sports talk program on ESPN

== Music ==
=== Albums ===
- Get Up (Bryan Adams album), 2015
- Get Up (Richie Kotzen album) or the title song, 2004
- Get Up! (Ben Harper and Charlie Musselwhite album) or the title song, 2013
- Get Up (EP), by NewJeans, 2023
- Get Up! (Helix EP) or the title song, 2006
- Get Up! (Soulhead EP) or the title song, 2003
- Get Up, by Ed Mann, 1988
- Get Up, by Jessi, 2005

=== Songs ===
- "Get Up" (50 Cent song), 2008
- "Get Up" (Amel Larrieux song), 1999
- "Get Up" (Baby V.O.X. song), 1999
- "Get Up!" (Beverley Knight song), 2001
- "Get Up" (Ciara song), 2006 (for the 2016 song by R3hab and Ciara, see below)
- "Get Up!" (Korn song), 2011
- "Get Up" (Lost Boyz song), 1996
- "Get Up" (Mary Mary song), 2008
- "Get Up" (Nate Dogg song), 2003
- "Get Up" (R3hab and Ciara song), 2016
- "Get Up" (R.E.M. song), 1988
- "Get Up" (Shinedown song), 2018
- "Get Up" (You Am I song), 2001
- "Get Up!" (Yuma Nakayama song), 2014
- "Get Up! (Before the Night Is Over)", by Technotronic, 1990
- "Get Up (A Cowboys Anthem)", by Kelly Clarkson, 2012
- "Get Up (I Feel Like Being a) Sex Machine", by James Brown, 1970
- "Get Up (Rattle)", by Bingo Players, 2012
- "Get Up", by Badmarsh & Shri from Signs, 2001
- "Get Up", by Big Time Rush from 24/Seven, 2013
- "Get Up", by Bombay Bicycle Club from Everything Else Has Gone Wrong, 2020
- "Get Up", by Brass Construction, 1978
- "Get Up", by Breaking Point from Coming of Age, 2001
- "Get Up", by Brokencyde from I'm Not a Fan, But the Kids Like It!, 2009
- "Get Up", by the Coup from Party Music, 2001
- "Get Up", by DJ Ross vs DY, 2005
- "Get Up", by JustFun, 2021
- "Get Up", by Mayday Parade from Anywhere but Here, 2009
- "Get Up", by Nik Kershaw from To Be Frank, 2001
- "Get Up", by Slaughterhouse from Welcome to: Our House, 2012
- "Get Up", by Sleater-Kinney from The Hot Rock, 1999
- "Get Up", by Superchick from Karaoke Superstars, 2001
- "Get Up", by Unwritten Law from Here's to the Mourning, 2005
- "Get Up", by Van Halen from 5150, 1986
- "Get Up", by Whitesnake from Flesh & Blood, 2019
- "Get Up", by Xiu Xiu from Forget, 2017
- "Get Up", by Zolani Mahola from the film Zambezia, 2012
- "Get Up", by NewJeans from Get Up, 2023

== Other uses ==
- GetUp!, an Australian political campaigning organization
- GET-UP, or Graduate Employees Together – University of Pennsylvania
- Trade dress or get-up, the characteristics of the visual appearance of a product

== See also ==
- Get Up, Stand Up (disambiguation)
- Get On Up (disambiguation)
