= Puss N' Boots/These Boots Are Made for Walkin' =

"Puss N' Boots/These Boots (Are Made for Walkin')"

Single by Kon Kan

from the album Move to Move
- Released: 1989
- Genre: Synth-pop
- Length: 3:38
- Label: Atlantic
- Songwriters: Barry Harris, Kevin Wynne
- Producers: Barry Harris, Mark Goldenberg

Kon Kan singles chronology
"Harry Houdini" (1988)	"Puss N' Boots/These Boots (Are Made for Walkin')" (1989)	"Move to Move" (1989)

"Puss N' Boots/These Boots (Are Made for Walkin')" is a song by Canadian duo Kon Kan, released as the third single from their 1989 debut album Move to Move. The song peaked at No. 61 in their native Canada, and at No. 58 on the U.S. Billboard Hot 100. In October 1989, the song peaked at No. 11 in New Zealand.

The song includes samples and interpolations of Led Zeppelin's "Immigrant Song" and "Good Times Bad Times", Nancy Sinatra's "These Boots Are Made for Walkin'" and the Champs' "Tequila". The scratch sample that can be heard throughout the song is sampled from Beside's "Change the Beat".

Contrary to popular belief, "These Boots Are Made for Walkin" was not sampled, but was re-sung by an unknown session singer which was produced to sound as though it had been sampled. Co-producer Mark Goldenberg resang the "wail" of Led Zeppelin's "Immigrant Song", and Bronx Style Bob did the rap.

== Charts ==
Chart (1989)	Peak position
Canada (RPM Top 100)	61
New Zealand Singles Chart	11
U.S. Billboard Hot 100	58
