= List of artists who reached number one on the U.S. Dance Club Songs chart =

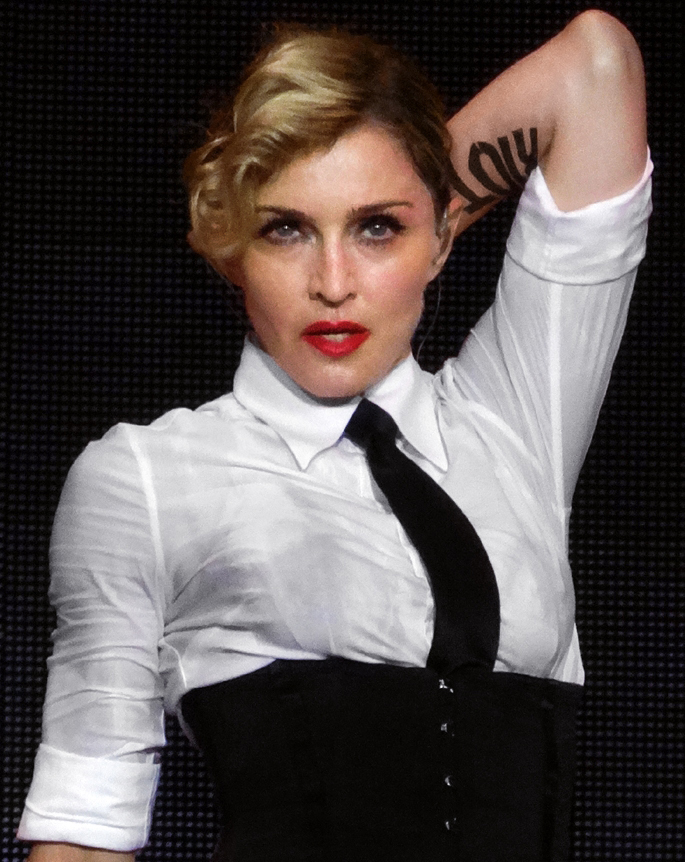
Madonna holds the record for the most number-ones since its inception with 50, and as of 2020 is the only living and active artist to have charted continuously since 1982. "Holiday"/"Lucky Star" (1983) marked her first number-one on the chart, with "I Don't Search I Find" (2020) being her most recent.

This is a list of recording artists who have reached number one on Billboard magazine's Dance Club Songs chart. Billboard began ranking dance music on the week ending October 26, 1974, and this is the standard music popularity chart in the United States for play in nightclubs. The chart has been suspended since March 2020.

- All acts are listed alphabetically.
- Solo artists are alphabetized by last name, groups by group name excluding "a", "an" and "the".
- Each act's total of number one U.S. dance hits is shown after their name.
- All artists who are mentioned in song credits are listed here; this includes one-time pairings of otherwise solo artists and those appearing as "featured".
- Many dance artists and producers utilize aliases and pseudonyms – this list shows whichever artist name was used on the record (for example, Size 9 gets one credit for "I'm Ready", instead of Josh Wink).
- Artists associated with a group who reached number one, yet have their own solo page on the English Wikipedia are not listed here, unless they hit number one as a solo artist.

== 0–9 ==
- 2 Chainz (1)
- 99 Souls (1)

== A ==
- ABBA (1)
- ABC (3)
- Paula Abdul (1)
- Zak Abel (1)
- Abigail (2)
- Colonel Abrams (4)
- Ace of Base (3)
- Sammy Adams (1)
- Adele (2)
- Adeva (2)
- The Adventures of Stevie V (1)
- Africanism/Africanism All Stars (2)
- Afro Medusa (1)
- Afrojack (3)
- Agnes (1)
- Christina Aguilera (10)
- Akon (2)
- Alana (2)
- Alesso (2)
- Nadia Ali (1)
- Alika (1)
- Alisha (1)
- Lily Allen (2)
- Herb Alpert (1)
- Alphaville (1)
- Altar (1)
- Amber (5)
- A*M*E (1)
- Tori Amos (4)
- Amuka (1)
- Anastacia (2)
- Anjulie (1)
- Marc Anthony (1)
- Anthony and the Camp (1)
- Arizona (1)
- Don Armando's Second Avenue Rhumba Band (1)
- Arrested Development (1)
- Art of Noise (1)
- Ashford & Simpson (1)
- A.S.K. M.E. (1)
- Rick Astley (2)
- Aubrey (1)
- Dave Audé (14)
- Audien (2)
- Audio Playground (1)
- Patti Austin (1)
- Thea Austin (1)
- Kevin Aviance (3)
- Avicii (7)
- Axwell (1)
- Axwell and Ingrosso (2)
- Iggy Azalea (4)

== B ==
- Cardi B (1)
- Jack Back (3)
- Bad Yard Club (2)
- Becky Baeling (1)
- DJ Bam Bam (1)
- Bananarama (1)
- Clean Bandit (1)
- Barnes (1)
- Claudja Barry (1)
- Netta (1)
- Rob Base and DJ E-Z Rock (1)
- Basement Jaxx (4)
- Basia (1)
- Basstoy (1)
- Bastille (2)
- Kaci Battaglia (2)
- Isabel Bayrakdarian (1)
- Aneeta Beat (1)
- Beats International (1)
- Daniel Bedingfield (1)
- Natasha Bedingfield (5)
- Bee Gees (1)
- Andy Bell (2)
- Jon Bellion (1)
- Benny Benassi (1)
- Joe Bermudez (2)
- Beyoncé (22)
- B. G., the Prince of Rap (1)
- Justin Bieber (4)
- Big Ali (1)
- Big Pun (1)
- Big Sean (1)
- Bimbo Jones (1)
- Bingo Boys (1)
- Bingo Players (1)
- Bionic Boogie (1)
- The Bird and the Bee (1)
- Birdy (1)
- Bizarre Inc (2)
- Björk (3)
- Aloe Blacc (1)
- Vic Black (1)
- Black Box (3)
- The Black Eyed Peas (1)
- Black Sheep (1)
- Blaze (1)
- Bleona (1)
- Mary J. Blige (8)
- Blondie (3)
- Jonas Blue (2)
- James Blunt (1)
- Blue Mercedes (1)
- Blue Pearl (1)
- Blush (1)
- C.J. Bolland (1)
- Bomb the Bass (1)
- Betty Boo (1)
- Book of Love (1)
- Boomkat (2)
- David Bowie (1)
- Brancaccio & Aisher (1)
- Brandy (3)
- Brass Construction (1)
- Dhar Braxton (1)
- Toni Braxton (6)
- The Braxtons (1)
- Sarah Brightman (1)
- Suzan Brittan (1)
- Bronski Beat (1)
- Pattie Brooks (1)
- Brothers in Rhythm (1)
- The Brothers Johnson (1)
- Andrea Brown (1)
- Angie Brown (2)
- Chris Brown (3)
- Havana Brown (4)
- Jocelyn Brown (4)
- Kathy Brown (1)
- O'Chi Brown (1)
- Peter Brown (1)
- Miriam Bryant (1)
- BT (2)
- B.T. Express (1)
- The Bucketheads (2)
- Descemer Bueno (1)
- Tom Budin (1)
- Jan Burton (1)
- Jenny Burton (1)
- Busta Rhymes (1)

== C ==
- C+C Music Factory (8)
- Ryan Cabrera (1)
- Victor Calderone (2)
- Donnie Calvin (1)
- Cameo (1)
- CamelPhat (2)
- Camila Cabello (1)
- Camouflage (1)
- Captain Cuts (1)
- Irene Cara (2)
- Joi Cardwell (4)
- Mariah Carey (17)
- Sabrina Carpenter (3)
- Louise Carver (1)
- Cash Cash (1)
- Cassius (1)
- Raquel Castro (1)
- Cazzette (2)
- Celeda (3)
- Cerrone (1)
- Chamonix (1)
- Change (2)
- Charice (1)
- Ray Charles (1)
- Charlotte (1)
- Judy Cheeks (2)
- The Chemical Brothers (1)
- Cher (8)
- Chéri (1)
- Cherie (1)
- Neneh Cherry (1)
- Cheyne (1)
- Chic (4)
- Chico Rose (1)
- The Child of Lov (1)
- Chili Hi Fly (1)
- The Chimes (2)
- Sue Cho (1)
- Shawn Christopher (4)
- Ciara (1)
- C.J. & Company (1)
- Kelly Clarkson (7)
- Linda Clifford (4)
- Angel Clivillés (1)
- CliQ (1)
- Club Nouveau (1)
- Club 69 (2)
- Clubhouse (1)
- Clubland (3)
- Isha Coco (1)
- Coldplay (3)
- Natalie Cole (2)
- Bobby Coleman (6)
- The Collaboration (1)
- The Communards (1)
- Company B (1)
- Consumer Rapport (1)
- Jem Cooke (1)
- Bradley Cooper (1)
- Deborah Cooper (2)
- JP Cooper (1)
- Kim Cooper (1)
- Alec R. Costandinos (1)
- Patrick Cowley (1)
- Carl Cox (1)
- Chris Cox (2)
- Deborah Cox (13)
- Mia Cox (1)
- Crazibiza (1)
- Sheryl Crow (1)
- Crown Heights Affair (1)
- Taio Cruz (2)
- Crystal Method (1)
- Culture Beat (1)
- Lizzie Curious (2)
- Noah Cyrus (1)
- Miley Cyrus (2)

== D ==
- Daft Punk (7)
- E.G. Daily (1)
- Lee Dagger (1)
- Dajae (1)
- Dakota (1)
- Da Mob (1)
- Steven Dante (1)
- Dany (1)
- The Daou (1)
- Vanessa Daou (2)
- Daphne (1)
- Dario G (1)
- Dat Oven (1)
- Kimberly Davis (2)
- Zelma Davis (2)
- Inaya Day (4)
- Taylor Dayne (3)
- DB Boulevard (1)
- Darryl D'Bonneau (1)
- Dead or Alive (2)
- Deb's Daughter (1)
- DeBarge (1)
- El DeBarge (1)
- Gente de Zona (1)
- Deee-Lite (6)
- Deep Dish (2)
- Definition of Sound (1)
- De La Soul (1)
- Delerium (3)
- Kat DeLuna (2)
- Cathy Dennis (3)
- Depeche Mode (10)
- Desert (1)
- Desiya (1)
- Deskee (2)
- Destination (1)
- Destiny's Child (4)
- Dev (1)
- Dido (5)
- Digital Farm Animals (1)
- Dimitri Vegas & Like Mike (3)
- Céline Dion (3)
- Diplo (1)
- Dirty Vegas (2)
- Dirty Werk (2)
- Disclosure (4)
- Disco Fries (1)
- Dizzee Rascal (1)
- DJ Bam Bam (1)
- DJ Cassidy (1)
- DJ Dan (1)
- DJ Disciple (1)
- DJ Escape (1)
- DJ Frank E (1)
- DJ Frankie (1)
- DJ Khaled (1)
- DJ Snake (1)
- DJ Yaleidys (1)
- DJs from Mars (1)
- D Mob (4)
- Dr. Buzzard's Original Savannah Band (1)
- Dollarman (1)
- D.O.N.S. (1)
- Double Dee (1)
- Carol Douglas (1)
- Al Downing (1)
- D:Ream (1)
- D. Train (1)
- Dragonette (1)
- Drake (1)
- Duck Sauce (1)
- Hilary Duff (3)
- Duke (1)
- Duke Dumont (7)
- Duran Duran (3)
- Dutch (1)
- Joseph Duveen (1)
- Dynamix (1)

== E ==
- Earons (1)
- Earth, Wind & Fire (2)
- Sheena Easton (1)
- Steve Edwards (2)
- Todd Edwards (1)
- Eleanor (1)
- Elderbrook (1)
- Elephant Man (1)
- Missy Elliott (2)
- Empire of the Sun (2)
- En Vogue (1)
- Kim English (8)
- Endor (1)
- Enigma (1)
- Jocelyn Enriquez (1)
- Erasure (2)
- Kendra Erika (1)
- Gloria Estefan (7)
- Estelle (1)
- Esthero (1)
- Eurythmics (2)
- Faith Evans (2)
- Eve (1)
- Everything but the Girl (4)
- Exposé (2)
- Eyes Cream (1)

== F ==
- Lara Fabian (1)
- The Face (1)
- Faithless (5)
- Ralph Falcon (1)
- Harold Faltermeyer (1)
- Fancy Inc. (1)
- Fantasy (1)
- Mylène Farmer (1)
- Fast Eddie (1)
- Fat Joe (1)
- Felix (1)
- Fergie (2)
- Fever (1)
- Fierce Ruling Diva (1)
- Filter (1)
- Fine Young Cannibals (1)
- Fire Island (1)
- Fisher (2)
- Cevin Fisher/Cevin Fisher's Big Freak (2)
- Roberta Flack (2)
- The Flirts (1)
- Flo Rida (1)
- Florence and the Machine (1)
- Dillon Francis (1)
- 49ers (2)
- Foxes (2)
- Livvi Franc (1)
- Aretha Franklin (6)
- Freeez (1)
- Freischwimmer (1)
- Friburn & Urik (2)
- Friscia & Lamboy (1)
- Full Intention (1)
- Funkstar De Luxe (1)
- Funky Green Dogs (4)
- The Funky Worm (1)
- Nelly Furtado (7)

== G ==
- G Club (1)
- G-Eazy (1)
- Peter Gabriel (1)
- Gabriel & Dresden (2)
- Gabrielle (1)
- Dave Gahan (1)
- Gary's Gang (1)
- Sean Garrett (1)
- Siedah Garrett (1)
- Martin Garrix (2)
- Marvin Gaye (1)
- Gloria Gaynor (5)
- General Public (1)
- Georgie Porgie (5)
- Georgio (1)
- Xenia Ghali (2)
- Ghostface (1)
- Gia (1)
- Roberta Gilliam (1)
- Jess Glynne (1)
- Xaviera Gold (1)
- Goldfrapp (5)
- Goldtrix (1)
- Selena Gomez (6) & The Scene (4)
- Goodboys (2)
- Good Question (1)
- Goon Squad (1)
- The Goodmen (1)
- Sheila Gordhan (1)
- Lonnie Gordon (3)
- Wynter Gordon (1)
- Gorgon City (3)
- Gotye (1)
- Ellie Goulding (2)
- Grace (1)
- Jaki Graham (1)
- Andy Grammer (1)
- Ariana Grande (7)
- A Great Big World (1)
- Jennifer Green (1)
- Vivian Green (3)
- Green Velvet (1)
- Gryffin (2)
- David Guetta (10)
- Gwen Guthrie (1)
- Gypsymen (1)

== H ==
- Gary Haisman (1)
- Daryl Hall and John Oates (3)
- Halsey (3)
- Erin Hamilton (2)
- Zemya Hamilton (1)
- Herbie Hancock (1)
- Hani (1)
- Happy Clappers (1)
- Happy Mondays (1)
- Paul Hardcastle (1)
- Duane Harden (1)
- Hardwell (1)
- Calvin Harris (7)
- Niki Haris (1)
- Debbie Harry (1)
- Dan Hartman (3)
- Darren Hayes (1)
- Heather Headley (1)
- Oliver Heldens (2)
- Pete Heller (1)
- Patrick Hernandez (1)
- James Hersey (1)
- HiFi Sean (1)
- Becky Hill (1)
- Paris Hilton (2)
- Neon Hitch (2)
- Jennifer Holliday (3)
- Loleatta Holloway (4)
- Adele Holness (1)
- Olivia Holt (1)
- Shawn Hook (1)
- Niall Horan (2)
- House of Prince (1)
- Thelma Houston (1)
- Whitney Houston (14)
- Jennifer Hudson (2)
- Rhetta Hughes (1)
- The Human League (2)
- Geraldine Hunt (1)
- Hybrid Heights (3)

== I ==
- Icona Pop (2)
- Enrique Iglesias (14)
- iio (1)
- Imagination (1)
- India (3)
- Information Society (1)
- Sebastian Ingrosso (1) (see also: Axwell and Ingrosso)
- Inner City (5)
- Instant Funk (1)
- INXS (1)
- Era Istrefi (1)
- Iyaz (1)
- Iyes (1)

== J ==
- Jack & Jack (1)
- Janet Jackson (20)
- Jermaine Jackson (1)
- Michael Jackson (8)
- The Jackson 5/The Jacksons (2)
- Debbie Jacobs-Rock (2)
- Janice Robinson (1)
- Felix Jaehn (1)
- Jam & Spoon (1)
- Parson James (1)
- Rick James (2)
- Samantha James (1)
- Jamiroquai (5)
- Chas Jankel (1)
- Erika Jayne (9)
- Jay-Z (3)
- Jaydee (1)
- Jeezy (1)
- Jellybean (3)
- Carly Rae Jepsen (1)
- Jessie J (1)
- The Jets (1)
- Jewel (3)
- J.M. Silk (1)
- Haley Joelle (1)
- Elton John (1)
- Howard Johnson (1)
- Paul Johnson (1)
- France Joli (1)
- Jomanda (2)
- Nick Jonas (3)
- Jonas Blue (5)
- Elsa Li Jones (1)
- Grace Jones (4)
- Hannah Jones (2)
- Jax Jones (1)
- Quincy Jones (2)
- Alexis Jordan (3)
- Juicy J (1)
- Juliet (2)
- Junior Jack (2)
- JX Riders (1)

== K ==
- Madleen Kane (1)
- Kane Gang (1)
- Karmin (2)
- Kaskade (2)
- Lena Katina (1)
- Tamra Keenan (1)
- Kelis (3)
- Kellee (1)
- Roberta Kelly (1)
- Johnny Kemp (1)
- Kenny G (1)
- Kerli (2)
- Kesha (3)
- Alicia Keys (2)
- Khalid (1)
- Chaka Khan (7)
- Khia (1)
- Kid Ink (1)
- Greg Kihn Band (1)
- The Killers (2)
- Kimbra (1)
- Evelyn King (2)
- Sean Kingston (1)
- Klaas (1)
- The KLF (1)
- Frankie Knuckles (5)
- Matthew Koma (2)
- Kool & the Gang (2)
- Kraftwerk (2)
- Lenny Kravitz (1)
- George Kranz (1)
- Kristine W (17)
- Krewella (1)
- KTP (1)
- Georgia Ku (1)
- Kygo (3)

== L ==
- LaBelle (1)
- Patti LaBelle (3)
- Chloe Lattanzi (1)
- La Bouche (1)
- Koko LaRoo (1)
- La Roux (2)
- La Trec (1)
- Lady Antebellum (1)
- Lady Gaga (15)
- Lady Sovereign (1)
- Laid Back (1)
- Mary Lambert (1)
- Lamya (1)
- Suzi Lane (1)
- k.d. lang (2)
- Zara Larsson (1)
- The Latin Project (1)
- Stacy Lattisaw (1)
- LaTour (1)
- Cyndi Lauper (3)
- Doug Lazy (3)
- Lea-Lorien (1)
- Carol Leeming (2)
- Annie Lennox (5)
- Blake Lewis (1)
- Donna Lewis (1)
- Huey Lewis and the News (1)
- Leona Lewis (1)
- Yvonne John Lewis (1)
- Like Mike (see Dimitri Vegas & Like Mike)
- Lil Louis (3)
- Lil' Mo' Yin Yang (1)
- Lil Wayne (3)
- Lime (1)
- Dua Lipa (8)
- Lipps Inc. (1)
- Lisa Lisa and Cult Jam (3)
- Livin' Joy (1)
- Lizzo (1)
- Cher Lloyd (1)
- LMFAO (2)
- Lodato (2)
- Kimberly Davis] (1)
- Kimberley Locke (3)
- Lorde (1)
- Lindsay Lohan (1)
- Londonbeat (3)
- Jennifer Lopez (18)
- Demi Lovato (5)
- Monie Love (1)
- Vikki Love (1)
- Love & Kisses (2)
- Love De-Luxe (1)
- Love Tribe (1)
- Love Unlimited Orchestra (1)
- Kimara Lovelace (1)
- LRS (1)
- L'Tric (1)
- Luciana (6)
- Ludacris (4)

== M ==
- M People (4)
- Timo Maas (1)
- Mabel (1)
- Madison Avenue (2)
- Madonna (50)
- Austin Mahone (2)
- Maino (1)
- Major Lazer (1)
- Malaika (1)
- Malea (1)
- Maluma (1)
- Conor Maynard (1)
- Herbie Mann (1)
- Taryn Manning (2)
- Kurtis Mantronik (1)
- Bob Marley (1)
- Maroon 5 (1)
- Ricky Martin (1)
- M/A/R/R/S (1)
- Bruno Mars (2)
- Marshmello (2)
- Billie Ray Martin (1)
- John Martin (1)
- Mary Jane Girls (1)
- Mary Mary (2)
- Pepper Mashay (1)
- Masters at Work/MAW (2)
- Maurice (1)
- MC Chickaboo (1)
- Jesse McCartney (1)
- Travie McCoy (1)
- Sarah McLachlan (1)
- Malcolm McLaren (1)
- Ava Max (1)
- Meduza (2)
- Meechie (1)
- Megn (1)
- Mel and Kim (2)
- Melanie C (1)
- Harold Melvin & the Blue Notes (1)
- Men Without Hats (1)
- Idina Menzel (1)
- M.I.A. (1)
- George Michael (4)
- Lisa Michaelis (1)
- Midi Rain (1)
- Bette Midler (1)
- Mighty Clouds of Joy (1)
- Miguel (1)
- Robert Miles (3)
- Christina Milian (1)
- Milk & Sugar (1)
- Stephanie Mills (1)
- Nicki Minaj (6)
- mink (1)
- Kylie Minogue (14)
- Mr. Fingers (1)
- Mr. Lee (1)
- Vernessa Mitchell (1)
- MK (3)
- MØ (1)
- Moby (4)
- Modjo (1)
- Moloko (1)
- Moné (1)
- Monica (2)
- French Montana (1)
- Michael Moog (1)
- Erick Moore (1)
- Jackie Moore (1)
- David Morales (7)
- Tony Moran (9)
- Meli'sa Morgan (1)
- Giorgio Moroder (3)
- The Movement (1)
- Murk (4)
- Brittany Murphy (1)
- Musique (1)
- My Crazy Girlfriend (1)
- Myon & Shane 54 (1)

== N ==
- Nabiha (1)
- Narada (1)
- Narcotic Thrust (1)
- Ultra Naté (7)
- Me'shell Ndegeocello (2)
- Negin (1)
- Joey Negro (2)
- Phyllis Nelson (1)
- Nervo (3)
- Ann Nesby (1)
- Robbie Nevil (1)
- New Order (6)
- Alex Newell (1)
- Olivia Newton-John (1)
- Ne-Yo (4)
- Stevie Nicks (1)
- Nightcrawlers (1)
- N-Joi (2)
- No Doubt (1)
- No Mercy (1)
- Noel (2)
- Noferini & Marini (1)
- Nomad (1)
- Lucas Nord (1)
- NOTD (1)
- Debi Nova (1)
- Nu Shooz (2)
- Nuance (1)
- José Nunez (1)
- Nuyorican Soul (1)

== O ==
- Oakenfold (1)
- Billy Ocean (2)
- Oceana (1)
- Octahvia (1)
- Oezlem (1)
- The O'Jays (1)
- Olive (1)
- Ollie & Jerry (1)
- One Direction (1)
- Ono (13)
- Opus III (2)
- Rita Ora (5)
- Original Broadway Cast Of Dear Evan Hansen (1)
- The Originals (1)
- Kelly Osbourne (1)
- Oscar G and Ralph Falcon (1)
- Robert Owens (2)

== P ==
- Paige (1)
- Suzanne Palmer (1)
- Paul Parker (2)
- Patra (1)
- Lizzy Pattinson (1)
- Sean Paul (1)
- Laura Pausini (2)
- Liam Payne (1)
- Nia Peeples (1)
- CeCe Peniston (5)
- Perpetuous Dreamer (1)
- Katy Perry (19)
- The Perry Twins (2)
- Pet Shop Boys (11)
- Pharrell (2)
- Photek (1)
- Phunky Phantom (1)
- Mark Picchiotti (1)
- Gary Pine (1)
- Pink (7)
- Pitbull (13)
- Cole Plante (1)
- Ben Platt (1)
- Plumb (1)
- Pocket Size (1)
- Poe (1)
- Pointer Sisters (1)
- Billy Porter (1)
- Gregory Porter (1)
- Powerhouse (1)
- Praxis (1)
- Pretty Poison (1)
- Kelly Price (1)
- Prince (7) and the Revolution (2) / and the New Power Generation (1)
- Princessa (1)
- Jamie Principle (1)
- Pulse (1)
- Pump Friction (1)
- Puretone (1)
- Pusaka (1)
- Pussycat Dolls (6)

== Q ==
- Qkumba Zoo (1)
- Quartz (1)
- The Quick (1)
- Q-Unique (1)

== R ==
- Rag'n'Bone Man (1)
- Karen Ramirez (1)
- Peter Rauhofer (1)
- Raw Stylus (1)
- Raze (1)
- Ready for the World (1)
- Real McCoy (2)
- Sharon Redd (1)
- Reel 2 Real (1)
- Reese Project (1)
- Regina (1)
- R3hab (3)
- Res (1)
- RetroVision (1)
- Bebe Rexha (2)
- Rihanna (33)
- LeAnn Rimes (3)
- The Ritchie Family (3)
- Riton (1)
- River Ocean (1)
- Robbie Rivera (4)
- Antoinette Roberson (1)
- Hilary Roberts (1)
- Juliet Roberts (3)
- Robin S. (7)
- Hannah Robinson (1)
- Janice Robinson (1)
- Vicki Sue Robinson (1)
- Robyn (2)
- John Rocca (1)
- Rockers Revenge (1)
- Nile Rodgers (6)
- Rokelle (1)
- The Romantics (1)
- Romeo (1)
- Nicky Romero (2)
- Mark Ronson (3)
- Rosabel (7)
- Ralphi Rosario (2)
- Oliver Rosa (1)
- Rosko (1)
- Diana Ross (9)
- Kelly Rowland (3)
- Barbara Roy (1)
- Röyksopp (1)
- Rozalla (3)
- Ruffneck (1)
- RuPaul (2)
- Ryan Riback (1)

== S ==
- Saint Etienne (2)
- Roger Sanchez (1)
- Emeli Sandé (1)
- Sandy B (2)
- Carlos Santana (1)
- Sash! (3)
- Nicole Scherzinger (1)
- Robin Schulz (1)
- Scissor Sisters (3)
- Scotty Boy (3)
- Seal (5)
- Seduction (1)
- S'Express (1)
- Shades of Love (1)
- Shaed (1)
- Shakira (7)
- Shalamar (1)
- The Shamen (4)
- Shannon (4)
- Shape: UK (1)
- Dee Dee Sharp-Gamble (1)
- Ben Shaw (1)
- Kierra "KiKi" Sheard (1)
- Jake Shears (1)
- Ed Sheeran (1)
- Duncan Sheik (1)
- Sheila E. (2)
- Shirley & Company (1)
- Shontelle (1)
- Shungudzo (1)
- Sia (7)
- Sigma (1)
- Silk City (1)
- Silver Convention (1)
- Eva Simons (1)
- Simply Red (3)
- Jessica Simpson (1)
- Bob Sinclar (6)
- Sinnamon (1)
- Sisaundra (1)
- Sister Sledge (1)
- Troye Sivan (2)
- Size 9 (1)
- Skipworth & Turner (1)
- Kathy Sledge (1)
- Fatboy Slim (1)
- Slim Thug (1)
- Slingshot (1)
- SM-Trax (1)
- Robert Smith (1)
- Sam Smith (3)
- Smooth Touch (1)
- Snap! (2)
- Snoop Dogg (5)
- So Pure! (1)
- Gino Soccio (2)
- Solange (3)
- Martin Solveig (2)
- Olivia Somerlyn (2)
- Jimmy Somerville (1)
- Sonique (1)
- Sono (2)
- Banda Sonora (1)
- The SOS Band (1)
- The S.O.U.L. S.Y.S.T.E.M. (1)
- Soul II Soul (2)
- Sound Factory (1)
- Sounds of Blackness (2)
- South Shore Commission (1)
- Jordin Sparks (1)
- Britney Spears (11)
- Sphynx (1)
- Spirits (1)
- Dusty Springfield (1)
- Lisa Stansfield (7)
- Stardust (1)
- Harper Starling (1)
- Edwin Starr (1)
- Static Revenger (1)
- Staxx of Joy (2)
- Stefflon Don (1)
- Lennon Stella (1)
- Steve Smooth (2)
- Skylar Stecker (3)
- Sted-E (3)
- Gwen Stefani (2)
- Stereo MC's (1)
- Rod Stewart (1)
- Sting (4)
- Byron Stingily (3)
- "Stomp" (cast of) (1)
- Angie Stone (2)
- StoneBridge (3)
- Nick Straker Band (1)
- Casey Stratton (1)
- Barbra Streisand (1)
- Sugababes (1)
- The Sugarcubes (1)
- Sultan & Ned Shepard (1)
- Donna Summer (16)
- Sun (4)
- Sundance (1)
- Sunshine (1)
- Sunscreem (3)
- Roberto Surace (1)
- Superchumbo (3)
- Supertramp (1)
- Jessica Sutta (4)
- Swae Lee (1)
- Swedish House Mafia (3)
- Sweet Sensation (1)
- Nathan Sykes (2)
- Sylvester (2)

== T ==
- Taka Boom (1)
- Talk Talk (1)
- Dawn Tallman (1)
- Tamia (1)
- A Taste of Honey (1)
- t.A.T.u. (1)
- Tavares (1)
- T-Connection (1)
- Tears for Fears (2)
- Technotronic (1)
- Ryan Tedder (1)
- Tegan and Sara (1)
- Tinie Tempah (2)
- Temper (1)
- Ten City (1)
- Danny Tenaglia (2)
- Todd Terry/Todd Terry Project (3)
- Terri B! (3)
- Therese (1)
- Thick Dick (1)
- Evelyn Thomas (1)
- Rob Thomas (2)
- Sheleen Thomas (1)
- Thompson Twins (3)
- Thunderpuss (2)
- Bryson Tiller (1)
- T.I. (1)
- Timbaland (1)
- Justin Timberlake (6)
- Timex Social Club (1)
- Tina Ann (1)
- Tinashe (1)
- The Ting Tings (2)
- Tiësto (1)
- Tom Tom Club (1)
- Tone Loc (1)
- Tony! Toni! Tone! (1)
- Sylvia Tosun (1)
- Dani Toro (1)
- Total Contrast (1)
- Tove Lo (4)
- Jeanie Tracy (4)
- Tramaine (1)
- The Trammps (3)
- Sisely Treasure (1)
- Barbara Tucker (8)
- Kreesha Turner (2)
- Tina Turner (1)
- 2 in a Room (1)
- Tyga (1)
- Ty Dolla Sign (1)

== U ==
- U.D.A.U.F.L. (1)
- Urban Soul (1)
- USA European Connection (1)
- Usher (2)
- Utada (1)
- U2 (4)

== V ==
- Vanity 6 (1)
- Despina Vandi (1)
- Vassy (6)
- Little Louie Vega (1)
- Vengaboys (1)
- Dimitri Vegas & Like Mike (1)
- Veronica (2)
- Mayra Verónica (1)
- Village People (1)
- Vintage Culture (1)
- Michelle Visage (1)
- Anna Vissi (1)
- Richard "Humpty" Vission (2)
- Voggue (1)
- Voyage (2)
- Vula (1)

== W ==
- Alan Walker (1)
- Jason Walker (5)
- The WAV.s (1)
- Wamdue Project (1)
- Wang Chung (1)
- The Wanted (2)
- Anita Ward (1)
- Was (Not Was) (1)
- Martha Wash (12)
- Waterlillies (duo) (1)
- Crystal Waters (12)
- Latanza Waters (1)
- Michael Watford (1)
- Jody Watley (7)
- The Weather Girls (2)
- Weekend Players (2)
- Florence Welch (1)
- Caron Wheeler (2)
- When in Rome (1)
- The Whispers (1)
- Karyn White (1)
- Betty Who (3)
- Widelife (1)
- Will to Power (2)
- Deniece Williams (2)
- Freedom Williams (3)
- Hayley Williams (1)
- Michelle Williams (1)
- Saundra Williams (1)
- Vanessa Williams (1)
- Chris Willis (3)
- Wisin (1)
- Stevie Wonder (3)
- WTS (1)

== X ==
- Charli XCX (1)
- X-Press 2 (2)

== Y ==
- Daddy Yankee (1)
- Yavahn (1)
- Yazoo (4)
- Yello (1)
- Karen Young (1)
- Val Young (1)

== Z ==
- Michael Zager (1)
- Zayn (1)
- Zedd (5)
- Zeitia (1)
- Zhana Roija (1)
- Zhu (1)
- Zohara (1)

== See also ==
- Artists with the most number-ones on the U.S. Dance Club Songs chart
- List of artists who reached number one on the U.S. dance airplay chart
- List of artists who reached number one on the Hot Dance/Electronic Songs
