= Get On Up =

Get On Up may refer to:

== Film ==
- Get On Up (film), a 2014 biographical drama about the life of American funk musician James Brown

== Music ==
- Get On Up (soundtrack), soundtrack to the 2014 film
- "Get On Up" (The Esquires song), a 1967 song by the Esquires
- "Get On Up" (Jodeci song), a 1995 song by Jodeci
- "Get On Up", a 2015 song by Pegboard Nerds and Jauz
- "Get on Up", a 2023 song by Fitz and the Tantrums from the deluxe version of their 2022 album Let Yourself Free

== See also ==
- Get On Up and Dance, 1996 album by Quad City DJ's
- "Get On Up and Do It Again", 1981 song by Suzy Q
- "Get Up (I Feel Like Being a) Sex Machine", a 1970 funk song recorded by James Brown with Bobby Byrd on backing vocals, which contains "Get On Up" as a lyric in several instances
- "Get Up Offa That Thing", a 1976 song written and performed by James Brown
- Get Up (disambiguation)
