= Get Up, Stand Up (Phunky Phantom song) =

Single by Phunky Phantom
- Released: 1997
- Recorded: 1997
- Genre: Electronica/House
- Length: 6:48
- Label: Distinct'ive Records (UK); Groovilicious (US); Central Station (Australia)
- Songwriter(s): Laurence Nelson, Jack Robinson, Vivienne Robinson, James Bolden
- Producer(s): Laurence Nelson

"Get Up, Stand Up" is a song by house music DJ/producer Laurence Nelson, who recorded the track under the project Phunky Phantom. The track features the repeated use of the only lyrics on the song, "Get up, stand up, strut your funky stuff sure enough", which was sampled from a 1979 disco song called "Strut Your Funky Stuff" by the American group Frantique. This was Nelson's only song to make the Hot Dance Club Play chart, reaching number one on October 11, 1997. The same track reached number 27 in the UK Singles Chart in May 1998.

== Track listings ==
12 in. vinyl (US)

- A1 Get Up Stand Up (Original Mix) 6:56
- A2 Get Up Stand Up (KLM Vocal Mix) 9:27
- B1 Get Up Stand Up (Tin Tin Out Dub) 7:49
- B2 Get Up Stand Up (KLM Dub Mix) 9:28

CD Maxi (UK)

- Get Up Stand Up (KLM Vocal Edit) 3:51
- Get Up Stand Up (Original Mix) 6:58
- Get Up Stand Up (Tin Tin Out Dub) 7:52
- Get Up Stand Up (KLM Vocal Mix) 9:35
- Get Up Stand Up (KLM Dub Mix) 9:28

CD Maxi (Australia)

- Get Up Stand Up (Radio Edit) 3:10
- Get Up Stand Up (KLM Vocal Mix) 9:28
- Get Up Stand Up (Tin Tin Out Dub) 7:49
- Get Up Stand Up (Tony De Vit Mix) 8:57
- Get Up Stand Up (Super Ego Mix) 6:14

== See also ==
- List of number-one dance singles of 1997 (U.S.)
