= Move to Move =

Studio album by Kon Kan
- Released: 13 June 1989
- Genre: Dance-pop
- Length: 40:16
- Label: Atlantic/WEA
- Producer: Barry Harris; Jon Lind; Dennis Matkosky; Mark Goldenberg

Kon Kan chronology
Move to Move (1989)	Syntonic (1990)

Move to Move is the debut album by Kon Kan, released in 1989 on Atlantic Records. It spawned the singles "I Beg Your Pardon", "Harry Houdini", "Puss N' Boots" and "Move to Move". The album reached number 69 in Canada. "I Beg Your Pardon" was a top 20 hit in at least six countries, going top 5 in the UK and the Netherlands.

Kon Kan founder Barry Harris produced the album, and wrote or co-wrote all but one cut. Kevin Wynne is lead vocalist on most songs, while Harris sang the title track and the ballad, "Am I in Love". Jon Lind and Bob Mitchell co-wrote material with Harris for the project.

== Track listing ==
Side one
No.	Title	Writer(s)	Producer(s)	Length
1.	"Arts in 'D' Minor/Harry Houdini (Note: Samples Grandmaster Melle Mel's "White Lines (Don't Don't Do It)" and Blondie's "The Tide Is High")"	Barry Harris	Harris; Jon Lind	6:41
2.	"Bite the Bullet"	Joe Neves Silva; Roman Panchyshyn	Harris	4:24
3.	"Move to Move"	Harris; Bob Mitchell	Harris; Lind	4:44
4.	"I Can't Answer That"	Harris; Mitchell	Harris; Lind	3:46

Side two
No.	Title	Writer(s)	Producer(s)	Length
5.	"I Beg Your Pardon (I Never Promised You a Rose Garden) (Note: Samples Lynn Anderson's "Rose Garden", GQ's "Disco Nights (Rock-Freak)", Silver Convention's "Get Up and Boogie", and Tones on Tail's "Go!", plus incorporates Spagna's "Call Me" and Elmer Bernstein's "Theme from The Magnificent Seven")"	Harris; Joe South	Harris	3:46
6.	"Am I in Love?"	Harris; Lind; Alan Coelho	Harris; Lind	5:02
7.	"Glue & Fire"	Harris; Kevin Wynne	Harris	4:05
8.	"It Doesn't Matter"	Harris; Dennis Matkosky	Harris; Matkosky	3:49
9.	"Puss n' Boots/These Boots (Are Made for Walking) (Note: Samples Led Zeppelin's "Immigrant Song" and Good Times Bad Times", Nancy Sinatra's "These Boots Are Made for Walkin'", the Champs' "Tequila", and Beside/Fab 5 Freddy's "Change the Beat")"	Harris; Kevin Wynne	Harris; Mark Goldenberg	3:46
Total length:				40:16

CD bonus tracks
No.	Title	Writer(s)	Producer(s)	Length
10.	"Arts in 'D' Minor/Harry Houdini" (Justin Strauss 12" remix)	Harris	Harris; Lind	6:52
11.	"I Beg Your Pardon (I Never Promised You a Rose Garden)" (12" remix)	Harris; South	Harris	6:41
Total length:				54:06

== Personnel ==
- Barry Harris - lead vocals (Move to Move, Am I in Love), keyboards, guitar (all tracks), producer (all tracks)
- Kevin Wynne - lead vocals (I Beg Your Pardon, Harry Houdini, Bite the Bullet, Puss N' Boots, It Doesn't Matter, Glue & Fire)
- Zulu Nation - rap vocals
- BX Style Bob - rap vocals (Puss N' Boots)
- Mark Goldenberg - vocals (Puss N' Boots), acoustic guitar, programming, co-producer (Move to Move, Puss N' Boots)
- Danny Pelfrey - saxophone (It Doesn't Matter)
- Luc Zoccolillo - piano (Bite the Bullet)
- Russell Ferrante - piano (I Can't Answer That)
- Simeon Pillich - bass (Puss N' Boots)
- Afrika Islam - scratches (Puss N' Boots)
- Jon Lind - co-producer (Am I in Love, Harry Houdini, I Can't Answer That)
- Dennis Matkosky - co-producer (It Doesn't Matter)

Programming

- Barry Harris
- Dennis Matkosky
- Tom Gerencser
- Jim Lang
- Mark Goldenberg

Background vocals

- Barry Harris
- Julia Tillman Waters
- Leslie Hall
- Jon Lind
- Julia Waters
- Maxine Willard Waters
- Debra Dobkin
