= I Beg Your Pardon =

1988 single by Kon Kan

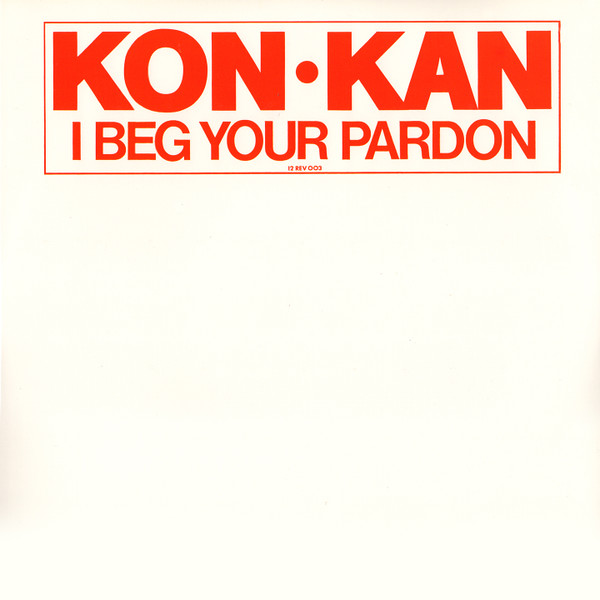
- Non-die-cut sleeve of the Canadian single

Single by Kon Kan

from the album Move to Move
- Released: 1988
- Genre: Synth-pop; dance-pop
- Length: 3:59
- Label: Atlantic
- Songwriters: Barry Harris; Joe South
- Producers: Barry Harris; Tom Gerencser

Kon Kan singles chronology
"I Beg Your Pardon" (1988)	"Harry Houdini" (1988)

Audio
- "I Beg Your Pardon" by Kon Kan on YouTube

Performance video
- "I Beg Your Pardon" (live, 2023) on YouTube

"I Beg Your Pardon" is a song by Kon Kan from the 1989 debut album Move to Move, released as their debut single in 1988. It was written and produced by Barry Harris. American musician Joe South also received a songwriting credit, due to the song's sampling of Lynn Anderson's 1970 hit "Rose Garden", which South wrote.

Harris said that the song was "the question to Lynn Anderson's 'Rose Garden' answer." It was Harris's first studio project, and was initially released on an unknown independent record label in Toronto.

The song was a hit, reaching the top twenty in a number of countries including the UK and U.S., where it peaked at numbers 5 and 15, respectively.

== Background ==
Barry Harris took inspiration from the Pet Shop Boys' 1987 single "Always on My Mind", which had repurposed Willie Nelson's 1982 country ballad into an upbeat synthpop song. Harris wanted to do the same with Lynn Anderson's 1970 country hit "Rose Garden". As he was a DJ at the time, he was "exploding with ideas" for little sounds he incorporated into "I Beg Your Pardon". Harris said, "The lyrics were about my first love relationship. As I had never really attempted to write lyrics seriously before, I already had the melody of the verses in my head so I simply started with a 'Once Upon a Time' idea… 'there once was a time and there once was a way…' and it pretty much flowed from there."

Musically, in this song, Harris also wanted to emulate "Bass (How Low Can You Go)" by Simon Harris, as well as "S'Express", two sample-based hits from 1988. The result was unique; Masterton wrote that Kon Kan's pop song "sounded like very little else on the market," and was quickly rewarded with chart success.

== Samples ==
"I Beg Your Pardon" also contains samples of other songs, including GQ's "Disco Nights (Rock-Freak)", Silver Convention's "Get Up and Boogie" and Tones on Tail's "Go!", as well as interpolations of Spagna's "Call Me" and Elmer Bernstein's The Magnificent Seven theme.

There is also a sampled piece of spoken word dialogue ("Do you want to hustle? / Do you want to salsa?") from That's Not Funny, That's Sick, a 1977 sketch comedy album from National Lampoon. The dialogue is pulled from a track called "Disco Hotline".

Music critic James Masterton wrote that the song was one of the first big club hits to contain prominent samples.

== Charts ==
=== Weekly charts ===
Chart (1988–1989)	Peak position
Australia (ARIA)	100
Belgium (Ultratop 50 Flanders)	4
Canada Top Singles (RPM)	19
Canada Dance/Urban (RPM)	2
Europe (Eurochart Hot 100)	17
Ireland (IRMA)	6
Netherlands (Dutch Top 40)	3
Netherlands (Single Top 100)	5
New Zealand (Recorded Music NZ)	7
UK Singles (Official Charts)	5
US Billboard Hot 100	15
US Dance Club Songs (Billboard)	3
US Dance Singles Sales (Billboard)	1
West Germany (GfK)	8

=== Year-end charts ===
Chart (1988)	Position
Canada Dance/Urban (RPM)	12

Chart (1989)	Position
Belgium (Ultratop)	48
Europe (Eurochart Hot 100)	80
Netherlands (Dutch Top 40)	43
Netherlands (Single Top 100)	68
New Zealand (RIANZ)	22
UK Singles (OCC)	66
US 12-inch Singles Sales (Billboard)	8
US Dance Club Play (Billboard)	19
West Germany (Media Control)	62
