= That Sound (Pump Friction song) =

Single by Pump Friction
- Released: 1997
- Genre: Disco; Funky House
- Label: King Street Sounds
- Songwriter(s): Alan Hawkshaw; Lewis Dene
- Producer(s): Lewis Dene

Pump Friction singles chronology
"That Sound" (1997)	"Vicious" (1997)

That Sound is a 1997 funky disco house single by British electronic act Pump Friction. The song heavily samples the 1979 disco song "Here Comes That Sound Again" by Love De-Luxe with Hawkshaw's Discophonia, but features additional vocals from Stacy Selsdon and Willy P. on this updated track. The single reached number one on the Billboard Hot Dance Club Play chart on May 11, 1997 for a one-week run.

== Track listing ==
CD Maxi (US)

- That Sound (Radio Edit) 3:39
- That Sound (Ragga Mix) 6:28
- That Sound (Club Mix) 7:53
- That Sound (Ralphi Rosario - Remix) 9:14
- That Sound (You Turn Me On Dub) 6:10
- That Sound (Odori Tribe - Remix) 7:14
- That Sound (Jason Nevins Dub Plate Mix) 6:58
- That Sound (Ragga Instrumental) 6:24

== See also ==
- List of number-one dance singles of 1997 (U.S.)
