= Chicken Man (instrumental) =

1975 tune composed by Alan Hawkshaw

Instrumental
- Recorded: 1975
- Studio: Munich, Germany
- Genre: Theme tune
- Length: 2:02
- Composer: Alan Hawkshaw

Audio
- "Chicken Man" on YouTube

"Chicken Man" is a tune composed in 1975 by Alan Hawkshaw, and used in two British TV series since the 1970s.

== Background ==
The tune was recorded in Munich as part of the Themes International music library. Hawkshaw composed it in less than an hour, saying he "didn't really know what [he] was doing" and that "he just wanted to do something quirky".

== TV theme tune ==
The tune was used as the theme to the long-running children's series Grange Hill. In its original version, it was used as the main title music from 1978 to 1987, and was replaced by a re-recorded version from 1988 to 1989. After being replaced by a completely different theme tune, it made a reappearance in the final series of the show in 2008. A different arrangement of "Chicken Man" was also used as the theme to early series of the British quiz show Give Us a Clue. It lasted as the theme tune from 1979 until 1981, when a new producer/director commissioned an entirely new theme tune.

== Other uses ==
Since then, the tune has been used as a jingle for the El Árbol supermarket chain in Spain throughout 2010, on UK adverts for Paddy Power bookmakers in 2013 and McVitie's DeliChoc in 2015 and as the musical bed for the feature "Homework Sucks" on Simon Mayo's BBC Radio 2 show in the UK. It was also sampled by Welsh hip hop group Goldie Lookin Chain on the song "Charmschool" from their 2005 album, Safe as Fuck. The full piece of music is 2 minutes 2 seconds in duration. It was featured in episode 2 of season 3 of the TV series The League of Gentlemen.
