= Syntonic (album) =

Studio album by Kon Kan
- Released: 1990
- Recorded: Quadrasonic (NYC), Platinum Island (NYC), Battery Studios (NYC), Axis Studios (NYC), Ignited Productions (LA), Amigo Studios (LA) and Sam Therapy (London), 1990
- Genre: Synth-pop; dance-pop
- Length: 48:46
- Label: Atlantic
- Producer: John Luongo; Paul Robb; Barry Harris; Martyn Phillips

Kon Kan chronology
Move to Move (1989)	Syntonic (1990)	Vida!... (1993)

Syntonic is the second album by Kon Kan, released in 1990 by Atlantic Records. It was the first Kon Kan album to solely feature Barry Harris; Kevin Wynne had departed the previous year.

Two singles were released from the album: "Liberty!" and "(Could've Said) I Told You So", the latter featuring a recreation of Jimmy Soul's 1963 number one hit, "If You Wanna Be Happy".

"Time" features a recreation of Canadian band Trooper's "We're Here for a Good Time (Not a Long Time)".

Four songs were co-written with Bob Mitchell, who had also co-written Cheap Trick's 1988 number one hit, "The Flame", and songs on Kon Kan's previous album.

Four tracks were produced or co-produced by renowned disco producer John Luongo, who had also worked with Blancmange in the early 1980s.

Two tracks were co-produced by Paul Robb, a member of Minnesota band Information Society.

"Victim" was originally a 1978 Candi Staton single. The Kon Kan version was originally conceived as a duet featuring Tim Curry and Carole Pope.

== Track listing ==
All tracks are written by Barry Harris and Bob Mitchell, except where noted.

No.	Title	Writer(s)	Producer(s)	Length
1.	"Liberty!"		John Luongo	5:01
2.	"(Could've Said) I Told You So"		Luongo	4:09
3.	"Victorious"	Harris; Chrissie Lomax; R. Bertola	Paul Robb; Harris	5:00
4.	"Time"		Luongo	5:18
5.	"Heaven Knows (I'm Missing You)"		Robb; Harris	5:01
6.	"Victim" (duet with Carole Pope) (Candi Staton cover)	Dave Crawford	Luongo; Harris	6:53
7.	"I'll Find Another Love"	Harris; C. Dixon	Martyn Phillips	3:57
8.	"My Camera (Oh How I Wish)"		Robb; Harris	4:38
9.	"Can't Stop the Fire"	Harris; Chrissie Lomax; Scott Humphrey	Phillips	4:41
10.	"Better Day"		Robb; Harris	4:08
Total length:				48:46

== Personnel ==
- Barry Harris – lead and backing vocals, keyboards and programming
- Paul Robb – keyboards and programming
- Gregge Tupper – keyboards and programming
- Martyn Phillips – keyboards and programming
- Joy Winter – lead vocals
- Carole Pope – lead vocals
- India – lead vocals
- MC Protege – rap
- Debbe Cole – backing vocals
- Harriet Harrison – backing vocals
- Gordon Grody – backing vocals
- Julia Waters – backing vocals
- Maxine Waters – backing vocals
- Jon Lind – backing vocals
- Chrissie Lomax – backing vocals
- Paul Pesco – guitar
- A.K. Eye – drums
- Al S. Ess – drums and percussion
- Danny Wilensky – saxophone
