= Get Up, Stand Up (disambiguation) =

"Get Up, Stand Up" is song written by Bob Marley and Peter Tosh.

Get Up, Stand Up may also refer to:

- "Get Up Stand Up" (Stellar Project song), 2004
- "Get Up, Stand Up" (Phunky Phantom song), 1997
- Get Up Stand Up (album), a 1998 album by Shabba Ranks
- Get Up, Stand Up: The Story of Pop and Politics, a 2003 television documentary series
- "Get Up Stand Up", a song by Patrick Andy
- Get Up, Stand Up, a 2011 book by psychologist Bruce E. Levine
- "Get Up, Stand Up", a 2013 episode of Grey's Anatomy
- "Get Up, Stand Up", a 2021 episode of Grey's Anatomy spin-off Station 19
- Get Up, Stand Up! The Bob Marley Musical, a 2021 musical based on the life of Bob Marley, written by Lee Hall
