= Here Comes That Sound Again =

Single by Love De-Luxe

from the album Again and Again
- B-side: "Let Me Make It Up to You"
- Released: 16 March 1979
- Genre: Disco
- Length: 3:48
- Label: Warner Bros.
- Songwriter: Alan Hawkshaw
- Producer: Alan Hawkshaw

Professional ratings
Review scores
Source	Rating
The Rolling Stone Record Guide	3/5 stars

"Here Comes That Sound Again" is a 1979 disco single by Love De-Luxe, a dance studio group formed by British producer, Alan Hawkshaw. Vicki Brown and Jo-Ann Stone were the lead vocalists on the single. The single hit number one on the dance charts in the middle of 1979, for one week. Six months later the track was released in the United Kingdom. The single did not cross over to any other chart and Love De-Luxe had no other charted singles in the United States. However, elements from the song were used for the intro to the Sugarhill Gang's hit single "Rapper's Delight".

The song’s chorus would later be sampled in another Billboard Dance Club Songs number one single, "That Sound" by Pump Friction, in 1997.

== Chart performance ==
Chart (1979)	Peak position
Canada (RPM Disco Playlist)	17
US Billboard Hot Disco Singles	1
