= Double Dee =

Band

- Origin: Ancona, Italy
- Genres: Italo house
- Years active: 1990–present
- Past members: Davide Domenella; Donato "Dany" Losito

Double Dee is an Italian dance music duo who scored one hit, "Found Love", which spent a week at #1 on the U.S. Hot Dance Music/Club Play chart in 1990. The single did not chart on the Billboard Hot 100 but did reach #64 on the Airplay chart.

Members of the group were Davide Domenella and Donato "Dany" Losito. "Found Love" was officially credited to 'Double Dee featuring Dany'. "Found Love" was re-issued in 1995, reaching number 33 in the UK Singles Chart. A further single release, "Shining" was a minor hit in 2003.

In Argentina, a cover of "Found Love" called "Fue Amor" by Jazzy Mel was a major hit in the early 1990s.

== Discography ==
=== Singles ===
Year	Single	Peak chart positions						Album
Year	Single	ITA	FRA	NED	BEL (FLA)	UK	US Dance	Album
1990	"Found Love"	24	22	38	40	63	1	Double Dee
1991	"Don't You Feel"	9	—	—	—	—	—	Double Dee
1992	"Hey You"	18	—	—	—	—	—	Double Dee
1992	"People Get Up!"	15	—	—	—	—	—	Singles only
1992	"The More I Get, The More I Want"	—	—	—	—	—	—	Singles only
1993	"Body Music"	—	—	—	—	—	—	Singles only
1994	"Love Nobody"	—	—	—	—	—	—	Singles only
1995	"Found Love" (re-release)	—	—	—	—	33	—	Singles only
1995	"Come Into My Life"	—	—	—	—	—	—	Singles only
1996	"I'm in Love"	—	—	—	—	—	—	Singles only
2001	"You"	—	24	—	—	—	—	Singles only
2001	"Can You Feel It"	—	—	—	—	—	—	Singles only
2003	"Shining"	—	—	—	—	58	—	Singles only
"—" denotes releases that did not chart

== See also ==
- List of number-one dance hits (United States)
- List of artists who reached number one on the US Dance chart
