= Grange Hill =

British children's television series (1978–2008)

- 2008 titles
- Genre: Teen drama; Children's soap opera
- Created by: Phil Redmond
- Starring: List of Grange Hill characters
- Opening theme: "Chicken Man" (1978–1987, 2008) "Chicken Man" (re-recording) (1988–1989) "Grange Hill theme" (1990–2007)
- Ending theme: As above
- Country of origin: United Kingdom
- Original language: English
- No. of series: 31
- No. of episodes: 601 (including 2 specials) (list of episodes)

Production
- Production locations: BBC Television Centre (1978–1985); BBC Elstree Centre (1985–2002); Childwall, Liverpool (2003–2008)
- Camera setup: Multi-camera setup (1978 - 1998); Single-camera setup (1999 - 2008)
- Running time: 25 minutes
- Production companies: BBC (1978–2002); Mersey Television (2003–2005); Lime Pictures (2007–2008)

Original release
- Network: BBC1 (1978–2005, 2008); CBBC (2005-2007)
- Release: 8 February 1978 – 15 September 2008

Related
- Tucker's Luck (1983–1985)

Grange Hill is a British children's television drama series, originally produced by the BBC and portraying life in a typical comprehensive school.

The programme began its run on 8 February 1978 on BBC1, and was one of the longest-running programmes on British television when it ended on 15 September 2008 after 31 series. It was created by Phil Redmond, who is also responsible for the Channel 4 dramas Brookside and Hollyoaks; other notable production team members down the years have included producer Colin Cant and script editor Anthony Minghella.

The programme was cancelled in 2008, having run every year for 30 years. It was felt by the BBC that the series had run its course.

== Overview ==
The drama was centred on the fictional comprehensive school of Grange Hill in the equally fictitious North London borough of Northam. As well as dealing with school-related issues such as bullying, learning difficulties, teacher-pupil relationships and conflicts, Grange Hill "broke new ground over the years, with the kind of hard-hitting storylines not usually seen in children's dramas", such as racism, drugs (e.g. Zammo McGuire's heroin addiction, LSD), teenage pregnancy, HIV/AIDS, homosexuality, knife crime, homelessness, rape/sexual assault, mental illness (e.g. bipolar disorder), divorce, cancer (e.g. leukaemia), gun crime, child abuse, alcoholism and death. The early years also saw the use of corporal punishment as a form of maintaining discipline, as at the time of its original broadcast the practice was still legal and would not be banned in state schools in the United Kingdom until 1986. The series was originally to have been called Grange Park, which would go on to be used as the name of the school in another Redmond creation, the Channel 4 soap opera Brookside (1982–2003). Grange Park is an area of St. Helens, Merseyside, where Redmond once lived.

== Series history ==
Grange Hill was originally conceived by ATV writer Phil Redmond, who first approached various television companies with the idea in 1975, unsuccessfully. In 1976, he managed to sell the idea to the BBC, and the children's drama executive Anna Home commissioned an initial series of nine episodes in a trial run, the first being broadcast on 8 February 1978.

From the start, the series sparked controversy over its realistic, gritty portrayal of school life, which differed from the idealised portrayals of earlier school dramas. Redmond has said that he was not fully able to start pushing the boundaries until the later series. This led to Redmond being summoned to lunch by BBC bosses and forced to agree that there would be no further series unless he toned certain elements down. Grange Hill's highest-profile period was undoubtedly the mid- to late 1980s. One of the most famous storylines during this time was that of Zammo McGuire (played by Lee MacDonald) and his addiction to heroin. This storyline ran over two series (1986–87) and focussed on Zammo's descent into drugs and how it strained his relationship with girlfriend Jackie and friend Kevin.

Among the programme's other favourite characters during this period were Gonch and Hollo, played by John Holmes (also credited as John McMahon) and Bradley Sheppard. During his time at the school (1985–89) Gonch took part in many moneymaking schemes, most of which were unsuccessful. There was a comedic element to the duo's relationship that worked well with viewers. Script editor Anthony Minghella, who worked on the series for several years during the 1980s, later won an Academy Award for Best Director for the film The English Patient in 1996.

During the 1990s, Grange Hill did not receive the same media attention that it had had just a few years before. The teachers were now equals in the narrative, with their personal lives taking up almost as much time as those of the pupils. In 1994, two characters were introduced with disabilities: Denny Roberts (Lisa Hammond), who had dwarfism, and Rachel Burns (Francesca Martinez), who had cerebral palsy. Both characters were presented as "one of the gang" and hated being accorded any special treatment because of their circumstances. This prompted the BFI's 2002 publication The Hill And Beyond to comment that Grange Hill had perhaps become politically correct.

Beginning on 4 April 1993, in celebration of the programme's 15th anniversary, the first fifteen series of Grange Hill were repeated during Children's BBC's Sunday (and later, Saturday) morning slots on BBC1 and BBC2. The repeats ended with Series 16 in 1999. In the 1990s Grange Hill was repeated in full on digital satellite and cable channel UK Gold, which broadcast the late 1970s and early 1980s episodes of the programme.

In 1998, it reappeared on partner channel UK Gold Classics, which was a digital-only channel showing programmes previously aired on UK Gold, and Grange Hill was part of its schedule. The channel lasted only six months, however, before becoming UK Gold 2 in April 1999. Interest in Grange Hill was renewed in the late 1990s and the series celebrated its 20th anniversary with the introduction of sinister Scottish bully Sean Pearce (Iain Robertson), who carried a knife and slashed the face of a classmate. Cast member Laura Sadler, who was heavily involved in this storyline, died after falling out of a building in June 2003; four years earlier her Grange Hill character Judi Jeffreys had been killed after slipping and falling out of the window of a burning storeroom in the school.

By 2001, the series was almost entirely issue-led and the decision to tackle the subject of rape upset some parents. But when Redmond's company Mersey Television took over production of Grange Hill in 2003, his plan was to get the show back to its roots and the issues were toned down as Redmond skewed the show towards a CBBC audience.

Series 29 was first broadcast on the digital CBBC Channel in the autumn of 2005, with a BBC One screening the following spring. Grange Hill returned on 14 April 2008 with its final series, including a return of the original theme music. Series 31 returned to BBC One after the previous series was shown exclusively on the CBBC Channel in 2007.

In 2019, Redmond spoke about possibly reviving the show and dealing with current social issues.

== Film ==
In early 2006, it was announced that a film of Grange Hill was to be released in late 2007 focussing on the lives of former pupils. There was silence on the project for 15 years, until it was announced in January 2022 that Redmond had written the script and was looking to start casting.

== Production history ==
For its first 25 years Grange Hill was produced in-house by the BBC, then the show was made independently for the corporation by Mersey TV, the production house founded by Redmond (and later renamed as Lime Pictures), hence the reason for the production move.

=== Television Centre years: 1978–1985 ===
Location external and some interior scenes in Grange Hill were originally filmed at real schools in London. The first of these was Kingsbury High School in North West London, which was used as the Grange Hill setting for the first two series. For series 3 (1980) exterior filming moved to Willesden High School (now Harris Lowe Academy) in Willesden Green, which was similar in looks to Kingsbury, and was also situated in a residential area of the capital. In 1981, Grange Hill moved to Holborn College (now Fulham Preparatory School) in Greyhound Road, Hammersmith. This school looked very different from the two that had been used previously, and it was also in a built-up area of London. Holborn College was the longest serving of the "real schools", remaining on screen until 1985. Up to and including 1985, interior scenes were shot at the BBC Television Centre in London.

=== Elstree years: 1985–2002 ===
In 1985, production shifted to the former ATV studios in Borehamwood, Hertfordshire. The BBC had purchased the studio complex the previous year. The studios, now known as BBC Elstree Centre, were the location for some exterior filming from Series 8 on the closed Elstree set. A 1960s office block, Neptune House in the facility now doubled as Hill's "lower school".

The change was explained on screen with an elaborate storyline whereby Grange Hill merged with rival schools Brookdale and Rodney Bennett to form a new school, Grange Hill. In Series 8 the merger had taken place and Grange Hill operated as a split-site school; the former Rodney Bennett building (Neptune House) being the lower school and the original Grange Hill building (still Holborn College) the upper school. St Audrey's School in Hatfield doubled as Grange Hill alongside Neptune House in the 1989 series.

In series 9, the Upper School building was condemned after a fire, allowing production of Grange Hill to fully move to Elstree including studio work. Grange Hill was, at this time, made as an outside broadcast in the same way as its stablemate, EastEnders. New producer Diana Kyle switched filming to a single camera format from 1999 onwards.

For the 1990 series, a purpose-built playground set with additional school buildings was constructed in the Neptune House car park, which had previously been used as the playground for Grange Hill since the move to Elstree. This set remained in use until 2002, with cosmetic modifications along the way. However, from 1994 use was also made of real schools once more including Nicholas Hawksmoor School, the former Campions Middle School in Stapleton Road, Boreham Wood prior to its demolition, and Bushey Meads School.

=== Liverpool years: 2003–2008 ===
Early in 2002, it was announced that Grange Hill creator Phil Redmond had signed a deal for his production company Mersey TV to produce the next three series of the programme. Production moved to Mersey TV's studios in Childwall, Liverpool from Series 26 onwards and for the first time in some years the appearance of Grange Hill School itself would change radically. On screen an explosion ripped through the school at the end of Series 25; during Series 26 tarpaulins covered most of the new "school" to mask the "fire damage".

Redmond originally wanted children from all over the country to participate in the relaunched Grange Hill, having a variety of regional accents in the series as opposed to just the London area voices which had become associated with the programme; however, almost all new characters were exclusively cast from the north-west of England due to the logistics of the child employment laws.

Real schools in the locality were also used including Croxteth Comprehensive, Holly Lodge Girls' School and St Hilda's C of E High School in Liverpool. In 2005, the former Brookside Parade set at Mersey TV was redeveloped to benefit Grange Hill and the new "Creative Learning Centre" subsequently became an integral part of the show. After Grange Hill ended in 2008, the CLC exterior set has now been turned into a skateboard park set for Hollyoaks while the former Grange Hill school frontage has become a permanent exterior for Hollyoaks High.

==== "The Grange" ====
In 2007, BBC Children's ordered major changes to Grange Hill so that it fitted in with the new requirement that all programmes under the CBBC banner must appeal to an audience age 12 and under – younger than the traditional age group for Grange Hill, which was the same as or slightly younger than the secondary school characters. Under a deal signed in 2005, Lime Pictures was contracted to produce Grange Hill until 2008, so changes began to be made.

For series 31 (the final series produced), Lime Pictures creative director Tony Wood set about the task of meeting CBBC's new requirements. He shifted much of the action away from general school life to "The Grange", the school's multimedia learning centre, which was given a radical makeover and became as much a "hang out" as a learning resource. The emphasis was now on younger characters with a group of Year 6 pupils regularly coming to use The Grange from primary school; storylines were much lighter and fantasy sequences were introduced. One episode, "Boarderman", saw a Year 7 pupil become a masked skateboarding superhero campaigning for an end to the school's ban on skateboarding. In another, "Veggin' out", a girl and her classmates smuggled animals from a local petting farm into school, believing they were destined for slaughter.

The Observer reported on 13 January 2008 that the BBC's intention was to shift the action away from Grange Hill School and into The Grange completely. Phil Redmond responded in the same article by calling for Grange Hill to be scrapped, saying the programme had been "robbed of its original purpose". Redmond had been planning a hard-hitting storyline to return Grange Hill to its gritty origins in series 31, and although he signed off the changes he believed it wasn't his show any more.

==== Cancellation ====
On 6 February 2008, the BBC announced Grange Hill was to be axed after exactly 30 years. The announcement was made by CBBC controller Anne Gilchrist just two days before the show's official 30th birthday. Grange Hill ended on Monday 15 September 2008.

In 2006, the BBC had announced big plans for the show's 30th birthday including special programming on BBC2, possible repeats and a lavish reunion of former stars during 2008. But in the event, none of these celebrations happened aside from a special BBC Radio 4 programme Grange Hill: Soap Pioneer, hosted by fan and comedian Robin Ince, broadcast on 4 September 2008. The last episode of Grange Hill was watched by 500,000 viewers.

Seven months later, Ashes to Ashes paid homage to the series in its episode 2.1 (airing 20 April 2009). In that episode, the time-travelling protagonist, DI Alex Drake, sees her daughter Molly incorporated into an episode of Grange Hill on the evening of 3 or 5 April 1982 [calendar indicates 3 April; the news report was from 5 April]. Molly (in new footage) tells headmistress Bridget McClusky (appearing as archival footage and Gwyneth Powell's newly recorded audio) that she and Tucker got into a fight when Tucker said her mother Alex was dead.

== Spin-offs and merchandise ==
The show spawned a spin-off called Tucker's Luck (1983–1985), which ran for three series starring Todd Carty. The three series saw the two lead characters (Tucker and Alan) finding work. The 1986 cast released Grange Hill: The Album, with two singles: "Just Say No" (tying in with a character's heroin addiction) and "You Know the Teacher (Smash Head)". The album was re-released on CD on 12 November 2007, as part of the BBC's 30th Anniversary celebrations.

On New Year's Day 1988, a documentary titled Behind The Scenes...At Grange Hill aired, presented by Lee MacDonald. The documentary featured: auditions, rehearsals and filming for series 11, the child actors' opinions on being tutored and chaperoned and what impact being in Grange Hill had on their schooling, as well as dealing with fame.

In 1989, a musical play titled Tucker's Return based on the series was staged at Queen's Theatre, Hornchurch. Starring Todd Carty who, as Tucker, now returned to Grange Hill as a PE teacher, it also featured several stars of the show both from Tucker's original run, and of the then-current series circa 1989.

In 2005, Justin Lee Collins reunited some of the cast members from the 1980s in the documentary Bring Back...Grange Hill.

== Title sequence and theme music ==
From the start of the series in Series 1 (1978) to Series 10 (1987), the title sequence was in a comic book style and used "Chicken Man" by Alan Hawkshaw as the theme tune.

From Series 11 (1988) to Series 12 (1989), a new title sequence was introduced, now using still images of certain topics, along with a bassier rendition of Chicken Man.

From Series 13 (1990) to Series 16 (1993), a new title sequence was introduced which showed pupils and staff travelling into school in a slightly grainy CCTV style. This was accompanied by a new, more contemporary-sounding theme written for the series by Peter Moss.

From Series 17 (1994) to Series 23 (2000), new titles were introduced showing pupils taking part various school subjects such as music, chemistry, PE and Food Technology.

From Series 24 (2001) to Series 25 (2002), a more colourful sequence was introduced, showing pupils interacting with the logo itself. This was due to Grange Hill being broadcast in widescreen for the first time, the opening theme had been cut slightly shorter for the first time since 1990.

Only used for Series 26 (2003), the titles once again changed, this was to reflect on the move to Liverpool as the previous titles featured shots of the old school building (based In Elstree), once again the titles & the theme tune had been shortened down.

From Series 27 (2004) to Series 30 (2007), the titles changed once again. These were in the style of a video game, and the Moss theme tune had been edited down to around 12 seconds by this point. This was the first time since 1989 that live action footage was not used.

For the 30th anniversary in Series 31 (2008), and what turned out to be the final series, an abbreviated edit of the original version of "Chicken Man" was reinstated as the main theme, and, for the final time, the titles had changed once again for cartoon pupils and staff experiencing topics discussed in older series' of Grange Hill.

Grange Hill was the first programme to use it as a theme followed by the popular quiz show Give Us a Clue, whose makers used it from 1979 to 1982, despite it already being played on Grange Hill. Give Us a Clue used a less dynamic custom arrangement more in keeping with the style of light entertainment programming.

The last four notes of the original theme song were heard when Brookside, one of Phil Redmond's other TV series, aired its final episode in November 2003.

From 1978 to 1993, the end music would change length and notes occasionally depending on how many actors were in the episode and the mood/theme of the episode. For example, a longer version of the end music would be used if more actors played a role or if the episode focused on a serious tone.

From 1978 to 1979, the ending credits would be on a plain black background.

The closing titles from 1980 to 1984 rolled over a different-coloured background for each episode.

From 1985 to 1989, the ending credits would play over various shots of the episode it showed.

From 1990 to 2008, the ending credits would be on a custom-made background that either shows the Grange Hill logo, or it would be related to the intro used during the time.

== Head teachers ==
Character	Actor/Actress	Duration
Mr E. Starling	Denys Hawthorne	1978
Mr Llewellyn	Sean Arnold	1979–1980
Mrs Bridget McClusky	Gwyneth Powell	1981–1984, 1986–1991
Mr C. J. Humphries	Dennis Edwards	1985–1986
Mrs Angela Keele	Jenny Howe	1992–1994
Mr Alistair H. McNab	Never seen	1995–1997
Mr Peter Robson	Stuart Organ	1998–2003
Mrs S. Bassinger	Jacqueline Boatswain	2004–2007
Miss Gayle	Cathy Tyson	2007–2008

Mr Starling appeared only once during Series One, and his initial, E., was shown underneath the name of the school in the first episode: the authority figure most regularly seen during this time was the Head of First Year, Mrs Monroe (Dorothea Phillips). Mr Llewellyn did not appear on screen during the 1980 series: the day-to-day running of the school was left to the highly competent but much put-upon deputy head Mr Keating (Robert Hartley), who was also deputy head under Mrs McClusky up to and including Series 7 in 1984. Similarly, Mr McNab was never seen at all during the mid-1990s; the most senior authority figure being Mr Robson who at this point was deputy head. Mr Robson himself did not appear on screen during Series 27, even though he was still headmaster for the early part of the series. Mrs McClusky, perhaps Grange Hill's best known head teacher, was demoted to deputy head temporarily in 1985 having had to reapply, unsuccessfully, for her post following the merger of Grange Hill with Brookdale and Rodney Bennett. When the new head, Mr Humphries, was killed in a road accident the following year, Mrs McClusky was again acting head and her permanent headship was later confirmed.

The final headmistress of Grange Hill was Miss Gayle, introduced as deputy head in the 2007 series although she did not appear in Series 31.

== Books ==
During the 1980s, when Grange Hill merchandising was at its height and the series arguably at its most popular, a number of annuals and novels were published.

Eight annuals were published from 1981 to 1988.

Comic strip adventures appeared in the short-lived BEEB magazine, which portrayed new stories, and the longer running Fast forward magazine which loosely followed the early 90s series, drawn by Nigel Parkinson. Additional comic strips occurred in School Fun and in the Radio Times. Grange Hill had its own dedicated magazine, but this only lasted two issues and a holiday special.

There were 14 short story books and novels, some of which were written or co-written by series creator Phil Redmond, but which also involved authors such as Robert Leeson and Jan Needle. Below is a full list of Grange Hill short story books and novels:

1. Grange Hill Stories, by Phil Redmond. First published by the BBC in 1979. Short stories.
2. Grange Hill Rules OK?, by Robert Leeson. Published by Fontana Lions in 1980. The first Grange Hill novel.
3. Grange Hill Goes Wild, by Robert Leeson. Published by Fontana Lions in 1980. Novel
4. Grange Hill for Sale by Robert Leeson. Published by Fontana Lions in 1981. Novel
5. Tucker and Co., by Phil Redmond. Published by Fontana Lions in 1982. Novel
6. Grange Hill Home and Away by Robert Leeson. Published by Fontana Lions in 1982. Novel
7. Great Days at Grange Hill, by Jan Needle. Published by Fontana Lions in 1984. Short stories that form a sort of prequel to Grange Hill Stories.
8. Grange Hill After Hours, by Phil Redmond. Published by Magnet in 1986. Novel
9. Grange Hill Graffiti, by Phil Redmond. Published by Magnet in 1986. Novel
10. Grange Hill on the Run, by Phil Redmond. Published by Magnet in 1986. Novel
11. Grange Hill Heroes, by Phil Redmond and David Angus. Published by Magnet in 1987. Novel
12. Grange Hill Rebels, by Phil Redmond and David Angus. Published by Magnet in 1987. Novel
13. Grange Hill Partners, by Phil Redmond and David Angus. Published by Magnet in 1988. Novel
14. Ziggy's Working Holiday, by Phil Redmond and Margaret Simpson. Published by Magnet in 1988. Novel

Not in Front of the Children, by Andy Martin, published by DNA in 2015, is an academic study of Grange Hill from Series 1 to the end of Series 16, including the 2 Christmas episodes. It also includes a brief study of the history of children's TV series and serials from 1960 to 1990.

== Video game ==
In 1987 a video game was released for the Commodore 64, ZX Spectrum, and Amstrad CPC.

A text adventure based on the series was written in 1985 for the BBC Micro and several other systems. It was mentioned as "upcoming' in several home computer magazines of the time but was not released.

== Home media ==
Highlights of the first and second series were released on VHS and laserdisc in the early 1980s. Both series were edited to remove some storylines and thereby shorten running times, given the duration of early videocassettes & Laserdiscs. The cover art for series 1 features a cast photograph (and small photos of specific individual characters) from series 3, as some characters pictured therein do not feature in that series. The cover art for series 2 features a similarly styled front cover, but with a cast photo from the correct year.

These abridged versions of the first two series of the show were also released on Betamax and Video 2000 around the same time.

To commemorate the 30th Anniversary of Grange Hill, 2 Entertain released two DVD box sets covering the first four series which were released on 12 November 2007. They were both rated PG by the British Board of film classification. There are no subtitles, episodes are in 4:3 (the original format) and both box sets come with a booklet detailing each episode. Some episodes have been edited to remove pop music tracks that could not be cleared for DVD release, and studio scenes originally shot on video have been filmized.

In 2018 the DVD rights were acquired by Eureka Entertainment. Series five and six were released on DVD on 19 November 2018. Series seven and eight including the 1981 Christmas Special were released on DVD on 11 November 2019. Series nine and ten including the 1985 Christmas Special where released on 19 October 2020. In 2021 Eureka Entertainment confirmed there will be no further series of Grange Hill released on DVD.

In January 2021, Britbox announced that the first four series of Grange Hill will be available to stream. Series 5-6 were added in July, series 7 in August, Series 8 in November 2021, Series 9 in January 2022 & Series 10 & 11 in July. Series 12 & 13 of the series were added to BritBox & ITVX in January 2023, Series 14 was added in July 2023, Series 15-23 were added in December 2023. Series 24 to 28 were added to the service in January 2025

The 1985 Christmas Special was added to BritBox in November 2022.

In September 2025 series 8 to 13 were removed from ITVx for “Legal Reasons”, series 7, 14-28 were removed shortly after. leaving only series 1-6 available.

Series 11 onwards has never been officially released on DVD, leaving Grange Hill unavailable once again.

DVD Title	Year	No. of Discs	Special features	No. of Episodes	Release Dates		DVD Distributors
DVD Title	Year	No. of Discs	Special features	No. of Episodes	Region 2	Region 4	DVD Distributors
Complete Series 1–2	1978–1979	5		27	12 November 2007	3 December 2008	BBC
Complete Series 3–4	1980–1981	6		34	12 November 2007	3 December 2008	BBC
Complete Series 5–6	1982–1983	6		36	19 November 2018		Eureka Entertainment (UK Release)
Complete Series 7–8	1984–1985	6	1981 Christmas Special	36	11 November 2019		Eureka Entertainment (UK Release)
Complete Series 9–10	1986–1987	8	1985 Christmas Special	49	19 October 2020		Eureka Entertainment (UK Release)
