= Get On Up (soundtrack) =

Get On Up: The James Brown Story (Original Motion Picture Soundtrack)

Soundtrack album by James Brown
- Released: July 29, 2014
- Genre: Pop; funk; soul; R&B
- Length: 71:32
- Label: Universal Music
- Producer: The Underdogs

Get On Up: The James Brown Story (Original Motion Picture Soundtrack) is the soundtrack to the 2014 film of the same name directed by Tate Taylor, based on the life of singer James Brown, and is played by Chadwick Boseman in the film. The album featured 20 songs which also include live renditions of tracks performed by Brown in concert tours but remained unreleased to the public, and five of the tunes which are newly produced and arranged by the record production duo Underdogs. The music was positively received by critics and nominated for Grammy Award for Best Compilation Soundtrack for Visual Media.

== Track listing ==
All tracks are written and performed by James Brown.

No.	Title	Length
1.	"Get Up (I Feel Like Being A) Sex Machine"	5:18
2.	"The Payback Pt. 1"	3:33
3.	"Out of Sight"	2:23
4.	"I Got You (I Feel Good)"	2:47
5.	"Caldonia"	2:10
6.	"Please, Please, Please" (Live)	3:55
7.	"Night Train" (Live)	3:01
8.	"Papa's Got a Brand New Bag Pt. 1"	2:07
9.	"It's a Man's Man's Man's World" (Live)	5:12
10.	"Cold Sweat Pt. 1"	3:03
11.	"Mother Popcorn Pt. 1"	3:18
12.	"I Got the Feelin'" (Live)	2:41
13.	"I Can't Stand Myself (When You Touch Me)" (Live)	3:10
14.	"Say It Loud – I'm Black and I'm Proud Pt. 1"	2:50
15.	"Get Up (I Feel Like Being A) Sex Machine" (Live)	6:37
16.	"Super Bad" (Live)	5:04
17.	"Soul Power" (Live)	6:13
18.	"Try Me" (Live)	3:01
19.	"Please, Please, Please"	2:47
20.	"Get Up Offa That Thing"	4:10
Total length:		73:20

== Charts ==
Weekly chart performance for Get On Up
Chart (2014–2015)	Peak position
French Albums (SNEP)	153
US Billboard 200	61
US Soundtrack Albums (Billboard)	4

== Awards ==
Award	Date	Category	Recipients	Result	Ref.
Grammy Awards	February 8, 2015	Best Compilation Soundtrack for Visual Media	Get On Up: The James Brown Story (Original Motion Picture Soundtrack)	Nominated	
Guild of Music Supervisors Awards	January 21, 2015	Best Music Supervision for Films Budgeted Over $25 Million	Budd Carr; Margaret Yen	Nominated	
Golden Reel Award	February 15, 2015	Golden Reel Award for Outstanding Achievement in Sound Editing – Musical for Feature Film	Curt Sobel; Jordan Corngold; Bill Bernstein; Stephanie Lowry; Richard Henderson	Won	
New York Film Critics Online	December 7, 2014	Best Use of Music in Film	Get On Up	Won	
St. Louis Film Critics Association	December 15, 2014	Best Soundtrack	Get On Up: The James Brown Story (Original Motion Picture Soundtrack)	Nominated	
