= Dat Oven =

Dat Oven is a dance/electronica duo based in New York City. The act consists of Jeffery Gratton (from Worcester, Massachusetts) and Shunji Moriwaki (from Oita, Japan).

The act has had three entries on the Billboard Hot Dance Music/Club Play chart:

- 1998 "Chelsea Press 2" (#1)
- 1998 "Icy Lake" (#18)
- 1998 "Jet Set" (#9)

The name "Dat Oven" refers to new ideas arising from friction, for example the clash of opinions that a creative duo might impose on each other; or the conflict between art and commerce. Friction generates heat; heat comes from the "Oven"; D.igital A.udio T.echnology is Dat Oven's medium (DAT).

In 2014, sister labels Night Slugs (UK) and Fade to Mind (US) put out a joint re-release of "Icy Lake", including several remixes by artists on both labels.

== See also ==
- List of number-one dance hits (United States)
- List of artists who reached number one on the US Dance chart
