= Outta Control (group) =

Canadian Eurodance band

Killer Bunnies
- Also known as: Outta Control
- Origin: Toronto, Ontario, Canada
- Genres: House, Eurodance
- Years active: 1995–1998
- Labels: Universal Records (as Killer Bunnies)
- Past members: Barry Harris; Rachid Wehbi; Kimberley Wetmore; Simone Denny (Killer Bunnies)

Outta Control, and later Killer Bunnies, was a Canadian house/Eurodance project based out of Toronto, Ontario.

== History ==
DJ/remixer/producers Barry Harris and Rachid Wehbi together with vocalist Kimberley Wetmore originally came together and began recording under the name Outta Control.

From 1995 to 1997, the group had three hit singles on Billboard's Hot Dance Music/Club Play chart: "Tonight It's Party Time", "One of Us" (Joan Osborne cover), and "Sinful Wishes" (Kon Kan cover).

After changing the name of the group to Killer Bunnies, Harris and Wehbi recorded a fourth charting single with vocalist Simone Denny, "I Can't Take the Heartbreak", which samples Class Action's "Weekend".

== Discography ==
=== As Outta Control ===
Year	Single	Peak chart positions		Album
Year	Single	CAN Dance	U.S. Dance	Album
1995	"Tonight It's Party Time"	—	42	Flamenco Funk
1996	"One of Us"	9	36	Flamenco Funk
1997	"Sinful Wishes"	—	45	Flamenco Funk
"—" denotes releases that did not chart

=== As Killer Bunnies ===
Year	Single	Peak chart positions		Album
Year	Single	CAN Dance	U.S. Dance	Album
1997	"I Can't Take the Heartbreak"	13	36	Single only
"—" denotes releases that did not chart
