= Alan Hawkshaw =

British composer (1937–2021)

Alan Hawkshaw BEM
- Born: William Alan Hawkshaw; 27 April 1937; Leeds, West Riding of Yorkshire, England
- Died: 16 October 2021 (aged 84)
- Genres: Rock and roll, pop, Electronic
- Occupations: Composer; performer
- Instrument: Keyboards
- Years active: 1960–2021
- Labels: EMI, KPM
- Formerly of: The Shadows

William Alan Hawkshaw BEM (27 April 1937 – 16 October 2021) was a British composer and performer, particularly of library music used as themes for films and television programs. Hawkshaw worked extensively for the KPM production music company in the 1950s to the 1970s, composing and recording many stock tracks that have been used extensively in film and TV.

He was the composer of a number of theme tunes including Grange Hill (originally library music recorded in Munich known as "Chicken Man") and Countdown. In addition, he was an arranger and pianist and, in the United States with the studio group Love De-Luxe, scored a number 1 single on the Billboard Hot Dance Music/Club Play chart with "Here Comes That Sound Again" in 1979. His song "Charlie" is heard on Just for Laughs Gags.

He was the father of singer-songwriter Kirsty Hawkshaw (a member of the dance music group Opus III from 1991 to 1995), who also worked with artists such as Tiësto, Delerium, BT, Seba and Paradox.

== Career ==
Born in Leeds, Hawkshaw worked as a printer for several years before becoming a professional musician, first joining the pop group The Crescendos. In the early 1960s, he was a member of rock and roll group Emile Ford and the Checkmates. He also formed the Mohawks band and Rumplestiltskin with some session musicians. At that time, Hawkshaw was an exponent of the Hammond organ, heard in the Mohawks' music, and also on the UK recording of the musical Hair. In 1965 Hawkshaw played piano on The Hollies group composed album track; "Put Yourself in My Place" included on the EMI/Parlophone album; Hollies (1965) being featured on a piano solo during the song.

Hawkshaw was also featured playing with David Bowie on the Bowie at the Beeb album, in a performance recorded for the "John Peel in Top Gear" show on 13 May 1968, in which he played a longer than expected solo on "In The Heat of the Morning".

In 1969, Hank Marvin recruited Hawkshaw into the Shadows to tour Japan in which one concert was recorded and subsequently released in Japan, The Shadows Live in Japan (1969), taking a featured lead on piano on "Theme from Exodus". In 1970, Hawkshaw recorded one more studio album with The Shadows, Shades of Rock, before leaving this band. He also appeared as keyboardist on the Shadows' spin-off vocal group Marvin, Welch, & Farrar's self-titled debut and follow-up Second Opinion albums, both released on EMI's reactivated Regal Zonophone label in 1971.

In the 1970s, he played in the Shadows; worked for Olivia Newton-John, Jane Birkin, and Serge Gainsbourg (including on "L'homme à tête de chou") as music director, arranger and pianist; and was a keyboard player for Cliff Richard, for whom he also co-wrote with Douggie Wright "The Days of Love", one of six shortlisted songs that Richard performed in A Song for Europe that year. He also played keyboards on Donna Summer's 1977 double album Once Upon a Time. One of his best-known compositions is "Blarney's Stoned", which was originally recorded for KPM in 1969 under the title "Studio 69"; it was used as the theme tune for Dave Allen's television shows The Dave Allen Show and Dave Allen at Large. In 1975, Hawkshaw wrote the theme tune to the BBC's On the Move educational programme, which featured Bob Hoskins as an illiterate lorry driver; the song was sung by The Dooleys. In 1977, he composed "New Earth Parts 1 & 2" for Hank Marvin's Guitar Syndicate LP project. This was subsequently sampled more than 30 years later by Jay-Z for his song "Pray". Also, during the late 1970s, music by Hawkshaw appeared in several films by Radley Metzger, including Barbara Broadcast (1977) and Maraschino Cherry (1978).

Hawkshaw performed the music The Night Rider (the theme for Cadbury's Milk Tray adverts), which was composed by another prolific creator of advertising themes, Cliff Adams. Hawkshaw also composed "Best Endeavours", which has been the theme for Channel 4 News since 1982; it also was used for the Australian Broadcasting Corporation's The National news and current affairs programme from 1984 to 1987. His tune "Chicken Man" was used as the theme for Grange Hill from its first series in 1978 until 1989, and revived for the final series of Grange Hill in 2008. Another recording of Chicken Man was used contemporaneously with the original Grange Hill version for the ITV quiz show Give Us a Clue. The Countdown "Chimes" jingle used on Channel 4's Countdown game show was also composed by Hawkshaw. He composed all the music for the Arthur C. Clarke's Mysterious World series, and the theme "Technicolour", which was used for the BBC Midlands Today programme from 1984 to 1988; it was replaced with a remix of this tune from 1989 to 1991.

In the United States, Hawkshaw scored a number 1 single on the Billboard Hot Dance Music/Club Play chart with "Here Comes That Sound Again" as part of Love De-Luxe with Hawkshaw's Discophonia in 1979. In Canada, it reached number 17.

Also in 1979, he released a disco album under the performing name "Bizarre", which was essentially a solo project with the help of executive producer Barry Mason. It was released in the UK on Polydor Records (cat. no. 2383 553) in 1979. He also once more appeared with The Shadows, guesting on their 1979 UK chart-topping album String of Hits playing piano on a cover of Paul Simon's "Bridge Over Troubled Water".

A 2018 CD titled Full Circle is credited to Hawkshaw and Brian Bennett; it was released on the KPM library music label, recreating the jazz funk style with Hammond organ that they established in the 1970s.

The Alan Hawkshaw Foundation, in conjunction with the Performing Rights Society, has provided scholarships to underprivileged music students and media composers at both the Leeds College of Music and the National Film and Television School since 2003.

== Personal life ==
After a brief early marriage, Hawkshaw married German-born Christiane Bieberbach in 1968; they had two children; singer, composer and musician Kirsty (b. 1969), and Sheldon (b. 1971).

He suffered his fourth stroke in July 2021, and died from pneumonia on 16 October, at the age of 84.

== Honours and awards ==
- Fellow of the Leeds College of Music
- Best Arrangement 1973 "I Honestly Love You" for Olivia Newton-John
- Ivor Novello Award best film score The Silent Witness 1979
- BASCA Nomination Best Television Score for Love Hurts 1991
- Gold Badge Award 2008 for services to the industry
- Doctorate for services to the music industry by Hull University and Leeds College of Music

Hawkshaw was awarded the British Empire Medal (BEM) in the 2021 Birthday Honours for services to music and composing.

== Selected discography ==
=== Emile Ford and The Checkmates ===
- 1961: New Tracks With Emile
- 1962: Emile

=== The Shadows ===
- 1969: Live in Japan
- 1970: Shades of Rock

=== The Mohawks ===
The Mohawks were a band formed from session musicians.

- The Champ (1968)
- Mo'Hawk - The Essential Vibes & Grooves 1967-1975, RPM Records (2003)

=== With Brian Bennett ===
- A Change of Direction (1967)
- The Illustrated London Noise (1969)
- Misty (Brian Bennett's Collage, 1973)
- Full Circle (Alan Hawkshaw and Brian Bennett, KPM 2084, 2018)

=== Library Music ===
- Speed and Excitement (KPM 1076, 1970)
- Music for a Young Generation (KPM 1086, 1971)
- Move with the Times (KPM 1123, 1973)
- Sounds of the Times (KPM 1170, 1975)
- The Road Forward (KPM 1192, 1977)
- Frontiers of Science, Bruton BRI 6, 1979)
