= Kon Kan =

Canadian synth-pop project

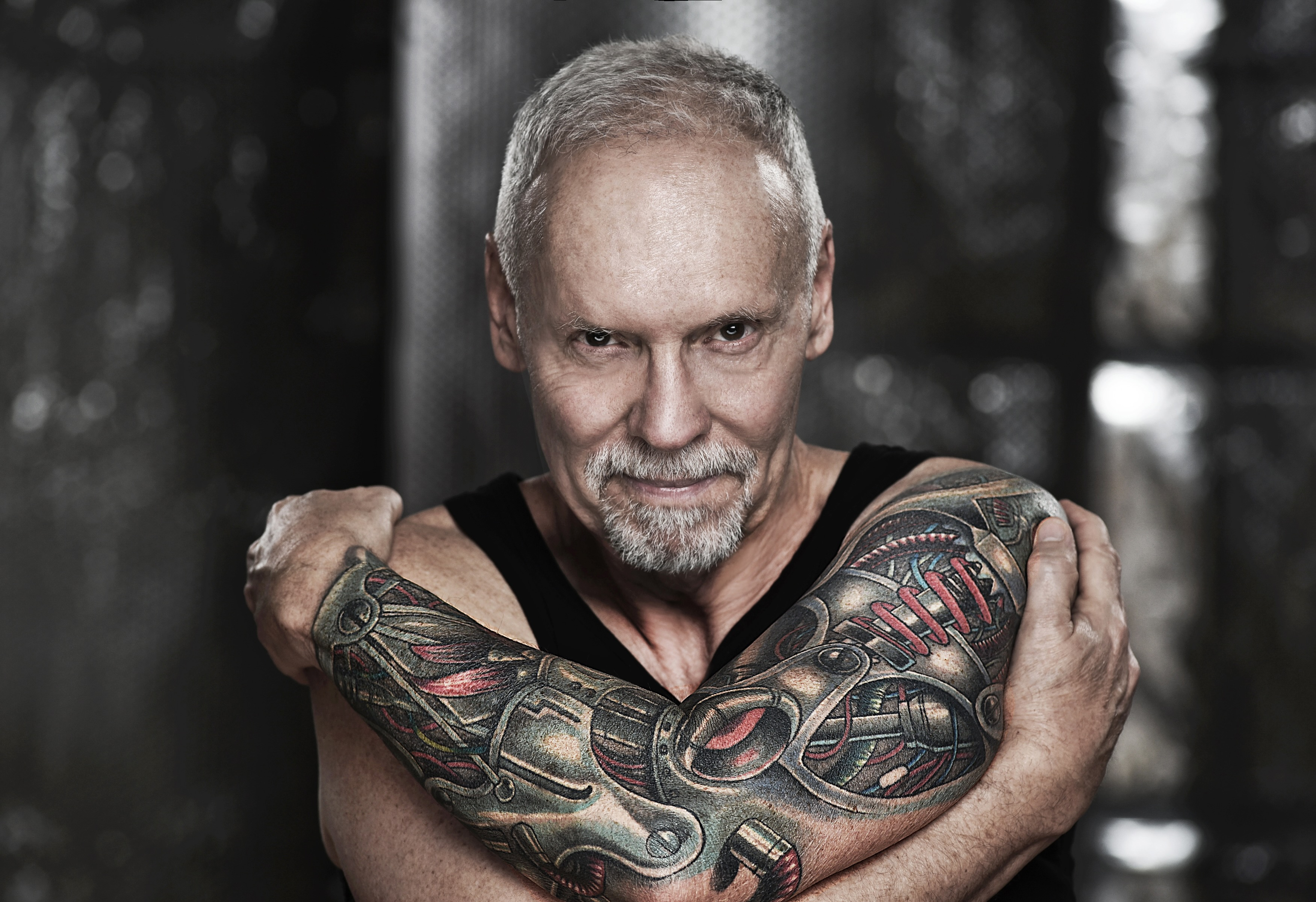
- Barry Harris of Kon Kan, 2023

Background information
- Origin: Toronto, Ontario, Canada
- Genres: Synth-pop; Hi-NRG; Electronic
- Years active: 1988–1994, 2013–present
- Labels: Revolving; Atlantic; Hypnotic; Hi-Bias
- Members: Barry Harris
- Website: Barry Harris' Kon Kan; Kon Kan on Facebook

Kon Kan is a Canadian synth-pop project conceived and formed in 1988 by Barry Harris in Toronto, Ontario. Kon Kan won a 1990 Juno Award for the song "I Beg Your Pardon" and was nominated for a 1991 Juno Award for the single "Puss N' Boots/These Boots Are Made for Walkin'".

== History ==
=== Name origin ===
Musician Barry Harris said the name "Kon Kan" is a play on the term "Can Con", the Canadian radio regulation that states radio stations must play Canadian artists at least 35% of the time. Harris named the group "Kon Kan" as a subtle advertisement to Canadian stations that he was Canadian. However, he said the move did not work, and he was not noticed by the stations until Atlantic Records signed them.

=== Breakthrough with "I Beg Your Pardon" ===
"I Beg Your Pardon" was inspired in part by both the Pet Shop Boys hit single "Always on My Mind" and an increasingly prevalent use of sampling by artists such as Public Enemy, M/A/R/R/S and Coldcut. The track sampled Lynn Anderson's 1971 hit "(I Never Promised You a) Rose Garden", Silver Convention's 1976 hit "Get Up and Boogie (That's Right)", GQ's "Disco Nights (Rock-Freak)", Tones on Tail's "Go!", Spagna's "Call Me", National Lampoon's "Disco Hotline" sketch from the album That's Not Funny, That's Sick, and the opening bars from the theme music from The Magnificent Seven, which was also well known as the theme to a commercial for Marlboro cigarettes in the 1960s.

In a 1989 Billboard interview, Harris reported that a trip to Portugal inspired him to write "I Beg Your Pardon", stating that he "got frustrated not getting anywhere as a DJ, so I went to Portugal to clear my mind. That's where the idea for 'Beg' came." The record was Harris' first studio project.

=== Move to Move and early success (1989) ===
Kon Kan's debut album, Move to Move, was recorded in Los Angeles in January and February 1989. Later that year, it appeared on the RPM Top 100 Albums chart. As well as "I Beg Your Pardon", it also spawned the singles "Harry Houdini", "Move to Move" and "Puss N' Boots". The latter track included replays and interpolations of Led Zeppelin's "Immigrant Song" and "Good Times Bad Times", Nancy Sinatra's "These Boots Are Made for Walkin'" and the Champs' "Tequila".

Music press and release-credit sources have identified Kevin Wynne as a session vocalist or credited vocalist on several Move to Move recordings, with Wynne credited for lead vocals or vocals on tracks including “I Beg Your Pardon,” “Harry Houdini,” “Bite the Bullet,” “Glue & Fire,” “It Doesn't Matter” and “Puss N’ Boots.”

=== Syntonic and Atlantic Records departure ===
Kon Kan released its second album, Syntonic, in 1990. Following the commercial failure of Syntonic, Kon Kan was dropped from Atlantic Records' roster.

=== Vida!... and later digital reissue (1993) ===
For the next album, Vida!... on Hypnotic Records, Harris resumed songwriting duties with Bob Mitchell and Kon Kan expanded to a four-piece band. Along with original songs such as the album's lead single "Sinful Wishes", there was a remake of "Move to Move" and a cover of David Bowie's "Moonage Daydream". The second single released from the album was "S.O.L.".

In April 2020, Harris released Vida! worldwide digitally with additional previously unreleased remixes.

=== Reunion activity and live performances ===
In June 2013, Barry Harris and Kevin Wynne briefly reunited as Kon Kan, but went their separate ways again in the spring of 2014.

On 16 May 2022, Harris posted a letter to Kon Kan's Facebook page announcing that he would not be performing as part of the band for the Lost 80's Live 2022 U.S. tour, and that he had allowed Wynne to use the Kon Kan name for that tour. Harris also said at the time that there would not be any new Kon Kan music. Also performing as part of the band was Sandy Horne of Spoons.

=== Touring lineup (2023–2024) ===
On 21 October 2023, Harris announced on Kon Kan's Facebook page the new Kon Kan 2023–2024 live touring band featuring himself on vocals, keyboards and guitar, with Kimberley Wetmore on vocals, Christian McFadden on vocals, bass and keyboards, Adam Weatherup on guitar, and Tim Fleming on drums and percussion.

In December 2024, Kon Kan was billed on a Brazil tour with Information Society, with dates in Belo Horizonte, Rio de Janeiro, Ribeirão Preto, Brasília, Goiânia, São Paulo and Porto Alegre.

=== Singles and self-titled album (2026) ===
In 2026, the official Barry Harris' Kon Kan site listed new release activity under the Barry Harris' Kon Kan name, including "My Medication", "Not This One", "Welcome to My Head" and "Where the River Runs", ahead of the self-titled album Barry Harris' Kon Kan, scheduled for release on 30 June 2026.

== Discography ==
=== Studio albums ===
- Move to Move (1989)
- Syntonic (1990)
- Vida!... (1993)
- Barry Harris' Kon Kan (2026)

=== Charting singles ===
Kon Kan singles that entered national singles charts
Year	Title	Peak chart positions						Album
Year	Title	CAN	GER	NLD	NZ	UK	US	Album
1988	"I Beg Your Pardon"	19	8	3	7	5	15	Move to Move
1988	"Harry Houdini"	39	—	—	14	88	—	Move to Move
1989	"Puss N' Boots/These Boots Are Made for Walkin'"	61	—	—	11	—	58	Move to Move
1989	"Move to Move"	84	—	—	—	—	—	Move to Move
1990	"Liberty!"	91	—	—	—	—	—	Syntonic
1990	"(Could've Said) I Told You So"	72	—	—	—	—	—	Syntonic
1993	"Sinful Wishes"	75	—	—	—	—	—	Vida!...

== Awards and nominations ==
Year	Award	Category	Work	Result
1990	Juno Awards	Dance Recording of the Year	"I Beg Your Pardon"	Won
1991	Juno Awards	Dance Recording of the Year	"Puss N' Boots/These Boots Are Made for Walkin'"	Nominated

== Production and recording personnel ==
Kon Kan recordings have included a changing group of songwriters, producers, mixers and credited recording contributors. On Move to Move, release-credit sources list songwriting and recording contributions associated with Barry Harris, Bob Mitchell, Jon Lind, Dennis Matkosky and other credited contributors, while Alan Meyerson is credited in connection with the album's mixing. Bob Mitchell, whose official site describes him as a songwriter, lyricist and producer, lists Kon Kan among the artists he has worked with.

For Syntonic, release-credit sources identify additional writing, production, mixing and vocal contributors across the album, including John Luongo, Martyn Phillips, Paul Robb, Debbe Cole, Gordon Grody, Carole Pope, MC Protege, India, Dee Lewis, Chyna, Leroy Osborne, Joy Winter, Julia Waters, Maxine Waters and Jon Lind. Luongo's official site describes him as a producer, mixer and remixer, while Phillips' official site describes him as a producer, composer, multi-instrumentalist, recording engineer and mixer.

On Vida!..., released through Hypnotic Records, Harris again worked with Bob Mitchell, and the recording credits identify additional contributors including Seri Gee, Lorrie Tice and Crash Morgan. The album included original material such as "Sinful Wishes" and "S.O.L.", along with a remake of "Move to Move" and a cover of David Bowie's "Moonage Daydream".

== Vocal contributors ==
Selected vocal contributors with standalone Wikipedia articles
Vocal contributor	Credited song(s)	Role / credit	Era / release	Citation
Bronx Style Bob	Puss N' Boots / These Boots Are Made for Walking	Rap vocal	1989 — Move to Move	
Debra Dobkin	Am I in Love?	Background vocals	1989 — Move to Move	
Mark Goldenberg	Puss N' Boots / These Boots Are Made for Walking	Re-sung vocal element	1989 — Move to Move	
La India	Better Day	Lead / featured / backing vocal	1990 — Syntonic	
Jon Lind	Arts in 'D' Minor / Harry Houdini; Victim	Background vocals	1988–1990	
Carole Pope	Victim	Duet / lead / featured vocal	1990 — Syntonic	
Julia Waters	Arts in 'D' Minor / Harry Houdini; I Can't Answer That; Am I in Love?; Victim	Lead vocal; session / featured lead vocal; background vocals	1988–1990	
Maxine Waters	Arts in 'D' Minor / Harry Houdini; I Can't Answer That; Am I in Love?; Victim	Session / featured lead vocal; background vocals	1988–1990	
