= Pump Friction =

Pump Friction is the studio project of DJ/producer Lewis Dene from London. He scored a number 1 hit on the US Billboard Hot Dance Music/Club Play chart in 1997 with "That Sound". He also reached number 40 that same year with "Vicious" (as Pump Friction & Soundclash featuring Connie Harvey).

Dene is also one half of the duo Solitaire (with Dave Taylor), which a scored number 13 hit in 2004 on Hot Dance Music/Club Play and number 7 on the Dance Radio Airplay charts with "I Like Love (I Love Love)", which sampled Norma Jean Wright's "I Like Love".

== Discography ==
=== Singles ===
List of singles, with selected chart positions
Title	Year	Peak chart positions				Album
Title	Year	AUS	FIN	UK	US Dance	Album
"Gotta Party"	1996	—	—	—	—	Singles only
"Keep on Believing"	1996	—	—	—	—	Singles only
"That Sound" (with Soundclash featuring Connie Harvey)	1997	—	—	—	1	Singles only
"Vicious"	1997	—	—	—	40	Singles only
"I Like Love (I Love Love)" (as Solitaire)	2003	26	—	57	13	Singles only
"I'm Thinking of You" (as Solitaire)	2004	36	16	—	—	Singles only
"You Got the Love" (as Solitaire)	2005	83	18	63	—	Singles only
"—" denotes releases that did not chart

== See also ==
- List of number-one dance hits (United States)
- List of artists who reached number one on the US Dance chart
