= Phunky Phantom =

American musician

Phunky Phantom is electronic and dance music producer Laurence Nelson-Boudville, who was born in Brooklyn, New York.

== Biography ==
His one U.S. chart entry came in 1997, when he hit #1 on the Hot Dance Club Play chart with the song "Get Up, Stand Up". The same track reached #27 in the UK Singles Chart in May 1998.

== See also ==
- Gat Decor
- List of number-one dance hits (United States)
- List of artists who reached number one on the US Dance chart
