= Latanza Waters =

American singer

Latanza Waters-Brown is a female house music singer who has been featured on several big club hits by various producers and remixers. Her first record, "Love Struck", was produced by Dewey B and released in 1995. This union led to the creation of the house music group Love Tribe which included Waters, producer Dewey Bullock, and musician Victor Mitchell. Signed by renowned music A&R Simon Dunmore to AM:PM Records in the UK, Love Tribe's 1996 cult classic single "Stand Up" reached No. 1 on the U.S. Hot Dance Club Play chart, and No. 23 on the UK Singles Chart in July of that year.

Waters is also the featured artist on two tracks by house music producer Eric Miller: "Deja Vu" (under Miller's alias E-Smoove) and "Insatiable" (under the Miller alias Thick Dick). "Insatiable" hit number 1 on the Hot Dance Music/Club Play chart in 2002. Waters and E-Smoove went on to release other songs as well; SubUSA's releases "Crazy" (E-Funk) and "Quiver" (E-Rock), Defected release "Beautiful" (2011), Strictly Rhythm's release "So Glad" (Love Journey), Slip N Slide's "Something Special" (House Avengers), and Basement Boys' release "Ordinary People".

She has also sung lead on "Mountain Top" by 99th Affair released on Playola (#16 US Dance in 2002) and "Bang On" by Purple Kitty released on Nervous Records (#17 US Dance in 2003). Waters is perhaps best known for the vocals on Thunderpuss's 2001 reworked version of Love Tribe's "Stand Up".

Waters worked as a teacher in Chicago and is currently writing for tween music company Big Kidz Radio, and authoring children's books, but still sings and writes songs. Her most recent tracks were her collaborations with Kings of Groove producers Franco De Mulero and Adam Moss called "I'm Lost" released on Purple Music in 2010, the Defected release “Beautiful”, produced by E-Smoove in 2011, “Bring Me Joy” Ibitaly, and “Give Me the Night” produced by DJ Kawasaki.

== See also ==
- List of Billboard number-one dance club songs
- List of artists who reached number one on the U.S. Dance Club Songs chart
