= Barry Harris (Canadian musician) =

Canadian musician

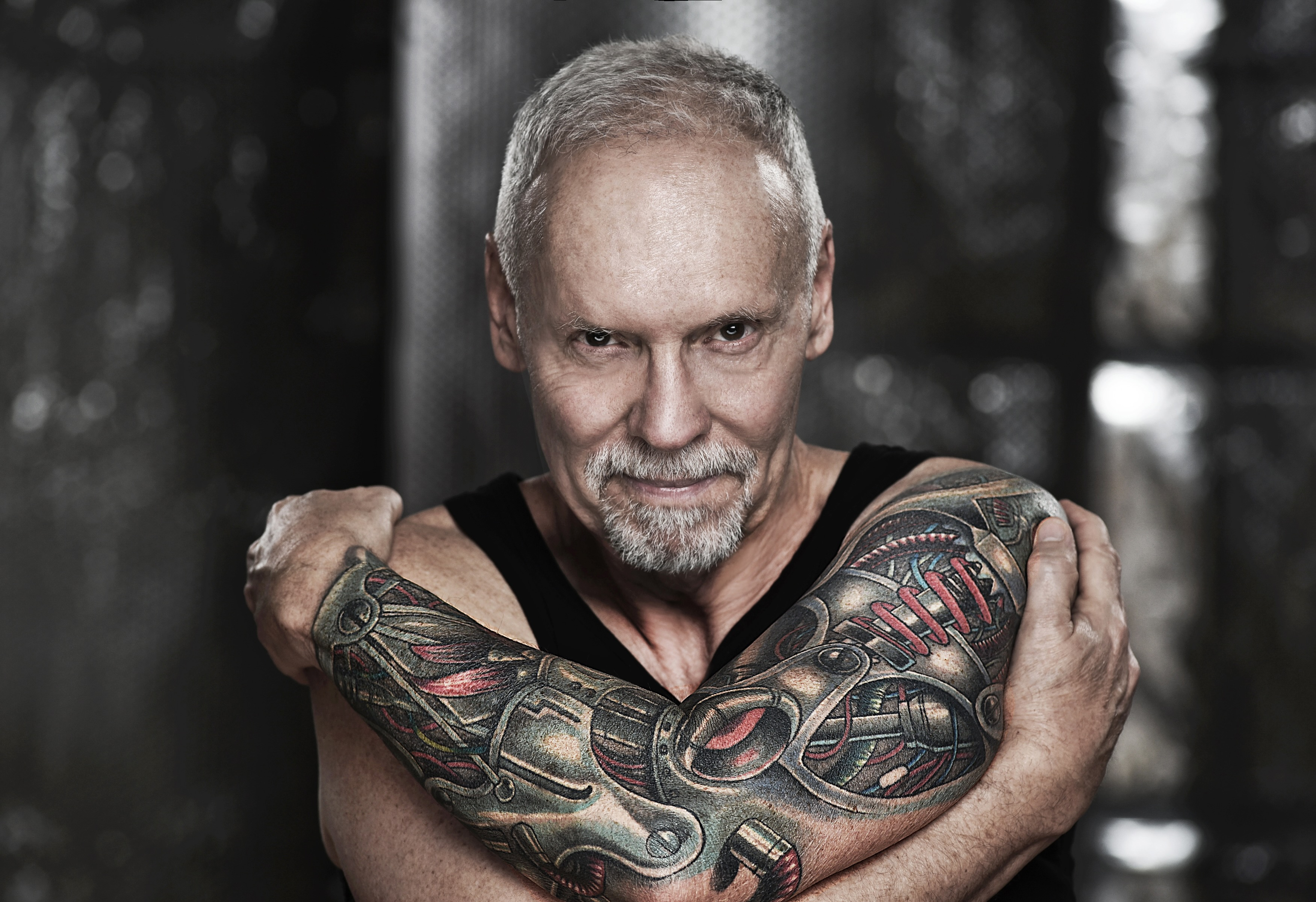
- Barry Harris in Toronto, Canada 2023

Background information
- Origin: Toronto, Ontario, Canada
- Genres: Synthpop, dance, house, rock
- Occupations: Record producer, DJ, musician, singer, songwriter, remixer
- Instruments: Keyboards, guitar, bass, vocals
- Years active: 1988–present
- Website: barryharriskonkan.com

Barry Harris is a Canadian record producer, DJ, remixer, singer and songwriter. He created the recording act he named Kon Kan in early 1988 which had worldwide success with "I Beg Your Pardon". The song, initially issued on the now defunct Toronto-based indie label Revolving Records, was quickly discovered and signed by Atlantic Records' A&R rep, Marc Nathan.

== Biography ==
Between 1997 and 2003, his production team Thunderpuss, co-created with Chris Cox produced worldwide hit remixes for Madonna, Britney Spears, Christina Aguilera, Whitney Houston, Enrique Iglesias, Jennifer Lopez, Mary J. Blige, Céline Dion, Cher, Janet Jackson, Spice Girls, LeAnn Rimes, among others. The duo topped the Billboard Hot Dance/Club Play chart more than 20 times.

Throughout his career, Harris has been involved in numerous projects and enjoyed chart success, most notably as Kon Kan and as one half of the duo Thunderpuss. Other involvements include work with Terry Kelly in the house project Top Kat, and with Rachid Wehbi and vocalist Kimberley Wetmore in the house/Eurodance project Outta Control which later became known as Killer Bunnies, with Simone Denny on vocals. Harris has also released several solo singles.

After a four-year break from the music industry from 2005 to 2009, Harris returned to the dance music scene in the fall of 2009 producing, songwriting and remixing, being the first producer/remixer in 2010 to obtain a Top 5 Billboard chart hit in each of the four decades - 1980s, 1990s, 2000s, and 2010s.

Harris also worked alongside producers Rick Nowells, Dennis Matkosky, Giorgio Moroder, and Ron Fair.

Harris' discography includes additional co-written hits such as "Dive in the Pool" from Queer as Folk with the catchy line "Let's get soaking wet", the song "Head" which appeared in NBC's Will & Grace, and "I Got My Pride" which appeared in HBO's Sex and the City.

He has produced for artists such as Jennifer Holliday, Taylor Dayne, Paul Robb (Information Society), Engelbert Humperdinck, Donna Summer, Simone Denny, Amber and Micah Barnes.

He has co-written with David Zippell, Bob Mitchell, Carl Dixon, Jon Lind, Enrique Iglesias and Dennis Matkosky.

Returning to his teen roots, he experimented with the rock genre and co-founded the alt rock band Sick Seconds. (2011–2013). They recorded one self-titled LP, Sick Seconds. Harris wrote/co wrote & produced all songs recorded at The Orange Room in Toronto, Canada in January 2013.

In 2014, Harris returned to produce and rerecord a new recording of "I Beg Your Pardon" as 'Barry Harris Presents Kon Kan' with the intent to tour again with Kevin Wynne. However lack of interest at the time produced no working touring income and the two once again went their separate ways.

In 2016, Barry Harris signed on as sole administrator of Spotify Artists page for himself & Kon Kan

In 2018, Harris sign on as sole administrator of Apple Music's Artist page for himself Barry Harris & Kon Kan

In 2020, Harris re-released Kon Kan's VIDA! L.P. digitally, previously only released in Canada 1993

From 2014 to 2021, Harris returned to DJing part-time and produced dance remixes of tracks by P!nk, Ariana Grande, Justin Bieber, Chainsmokers, Beyoncé, Taylor Swift, Adele, Calvin Harris, Rihanna, Justin Timberlake, Ellie Goulding, Meghan Trainor and Sia, among others.

In November 2022, Harris reunited with Chris Cox as Thunderpuss producing "Don't Cry for Me" by Whitney Houston.

In 2023, Harris released two new Kon Kan songs. "Stars" in July and "Sinful Wishes (Moonlight Mix)" ft. Kimberley Wetmore.

== Awards ==
- 1989: Canadian Juno award for "I Beg Your Pardon"
- 2000: ASCAP Rhythm & Soul Award (writer & publisher SOCAN) for "Dive in the Pool"
- 2000: WMC - International Music Award - Best Underground 12" Dance Record
- 2000: WMC Best Remixer - Thunderpuss
