= List of Billboard number-one dance singles of 1991 =

Billboard magazine compiled the top-performing dance singles in the United States on the Hot Dance Music Club Play chart and the Hot Dance Music 12-inch Singles Sales chart. Premiered in 1976, the Club Play chart ranked the most-played singles on dance club based on reports from a national sample of club DJs. The 12-inch Singles Sales chart was launched in 1985 to compile the best-selling dance singles based on retail sales across the United States.

== Charts history ==
Chart history
| Issue date | Hot Dance Music Club Play | | Hot Dance Music 12-inch Singles Sales | | Ref. |
| Issue date | Title | Artist(s) | Title | Artist(s) | Ref. |
|---|---|---|---|---|---|
| January 5 | "Power of Love"/ "Build the Bridge" | Deee-Lite | "Gonna Make You Sweat (Everybody Dance Now)" | C+C Music Factory featuring Freedom Williams | |
| January 12 | "Power of Love"/ "Build the Bridge" | Deee-Lite | "Gonna Make You Sweat (Everybody Dance Now)" | C+C Music Factory featuring Freedom Williams | |
| January 19 | "Justify My Love" | Madonna | "Justify My Love" | Madonna | |
| January 26 | "Justify My Love" | Madonna | "Justify My Love" | Madonna | |
| February 2 | "I Don't Know Anybody Else" | Black Box | "Justify My Love" | Madonna | |
| February 9 | "Another Sleepless Night" | Shawn Christopher | "I Don't Know Anybody Else" | Black Box | |
| February 16 | "Another Sleepless Night" | Shawn Christopher | "I Don't Know Anybody Else" | Black Box | |
| February 23 | "Sadeness (Part I)" | Enigma | "I Don't Know Anybody Else" | Black Box | |
| March 2 | "Sadeness (Part I)" | Enigma | "Power of Love"/ "Build the Bridge" | Deee-Lite | |
| March 9 | "Sadeness (Part I)" | Enigma | "Jealousy" | The Adventures of Stevie V | |
| March 16 | "Someday" | Mariah Carey | "Hold You Tight" | Tara Kemp | |
| March 23 | "Touch Me (All Night Long)" | Cathy Dennis | "Sadeness (Part I)" | Enigma | |
| March 30 | "How to Dance" | Bingoboys featuring Princessa | "Sadeness (Part I)" | Enigma | |
| April 6 | "I've Been Thinking About You" | Londonbeat | "Rescue Me" | Madonna | |
| April 13 | "Here We Go (Let's Rock & Roll)" | C+C Music Factory presents Freedom Williams and Zelma Davis | "Rescue Me" | Madonna | |
| April 20 | "Here We Go (Let's Rock & Roll)" | C+C Music Factory presents Freedom Williams and Zelma Davis | "Rescue Me" | Madonna | |
| April 27 | "Here We Go (Let's Rock & Roll)" | C+C Music Factory presents Freedom Williams and Zelma Davis | "Here We Go (Let's Rock & Roll)" | C+C Music Factory presents Freedom Williams and Zelma Davis | |
| May 4 | "Strike It Up" | Black Box | "It's a Shame (My Sister)" | Monie Love Featuring True Image | |
| May 11 | "People Are Still Having Sex" | LaTour | "It's a Shame (My Sister)" | Monie Love Featuring True Image | |
| May 18 | "People Are Still Having Sex" | LaTour | "Touch Me (All Night Long)" | Cathy Dennis | |
| May 25 | "Gypsy Woman (She's Homeless)" | Crystal Waters | "Gypsy Woman (She's Homeless)" | Crystal Waters | |
| June 1 | "Gypsy Woman (She's Homeless)" | Crystal Waters | "Gypsy Woman (She's Homeless)" | Crystal Waters | |
| June 8 | "Gypsy Woman (She's Homeless)" | Crystal Waters | "Gypsy Woman (She's Homeless)" | Crystal Waters | |
| June 15 | "Good Beat" | Deee-Lite | "Gypsy Woman (She's Homeless)" | Crystal Waters | |
| June 22 | "Good Beat" | Deee-Lite | "Gypsy Woman (She's Homeless)" | Crystal Waters | |
| June 29 | "(I Wanna Give You) Devotion" | Nomad | "Gypsy Woman (She's Homeless)" | Crystal Waters | |
| July 6 | "Got a Love for You" | Jomanda | "I Wanna Sex You Up" (From "New Jack City") | Color Me Badd | |
| July 13 | "Let the Beat Hit 'Em" | Lisa Lisa and Cult Jam | "I Wanna Sex You Up" (From "New Jack City") | Color Me Badd | |
| July 20 | "Let the Beat Hit 'Em" | Lisa Lisa and Cult Jam | "Let the Beat Hit 'Em" | Lisa Lisa and Cult Jam | |
| July 27 | "Let the Beat Hit 'Em" | Lisa Lisa and Cult Jam | "Let the Beat Hit 'Em" | Lisa Lisa and Cult Jam | |
| August 3 | "3 a.m. Eternal" | The KLF | "Let the Beat Hit 'Em" | Lisa Lisa and Cult Jam | |
| August 10 | "Deep in My Heart" | Clubhouse | "Temptation" | Corina | |
| August 17 | "This Beat Is Hot" | B.G., the Prince of Rap | "Now That We Found Love" | Heavy D. & The Boyz | |
| August 24 | "Such a Good Feeling" | Brothers in Rhythm | "Now That We Found Love" | Heavy D. & The Boyz | |
| August 31 | "Things That Make You Go Hmmm..." | C+C Music Factory presents Freedom Williams and Zelma Davis | "This Beat Is Hot" | B.G., the Prince of Rap | |
| September 7 | "Things That Make You Go Hmmm..." | C+C Music Factory presents Freedom Williams and Zelma Davis | "This Beat Is Hot" | B.G., the Prince of Rap | |
| September 14 | "The Whistle Song" | Frankie Knuckles | "Things That Make You Go Hmmm..." | C+C Music Factory presents Freedom Williams and Zelma Davis | |
| September 21 | "Makin' Happy" | Crystal Waters | "Makin' Happy" | Crystal Waters | |
| September 28 | "Gett Off" | Prince and the New Power Generation | "Makin' Happy" | Crystal Waters | |
| October 5 | "Ride on the Rhythm" | Little Louie Vega with Marc Anthony | "Makin' Happy" | Crystal Waters | |
| October 12 | "Gonna Catch You" | Lonnie Gordon | "Good Vibrations" | Marky Mark and the Funky Bunch Featuring Loleatta Holloway | |
| October 19 | "Lost in Music" | Stereo MC's | "O.P.P." | Naughty By Nature | |
| October 26 | "Finally" | CeCe Peniston | "Gett Off" | Prince and the New Power Generation | |
| November 2 | "Finally" | CeCe Peniston | "Running Back To You" | Vanessa Williams | |
| November 9 | "The Pressure Part 1" | Sounds of Blackness | "Running Back To You" | Vanessa Williams | |
| November 16 | "Move Any Mountain (Progen 91)" | The Shamen | "Finally" | CeCe Peniston | |
| November 23 | "Move Any Mountain (Progen 91)" | The Shamen | "Finally" | CeCe Peniston | |
| November 30 | "Emotions" | Mariah Carey | "Set Adrift On Memory Bliss" | P.M. Dawn | |
| December 7 | "Change" | Lisa Stansfield | "Set Adrift On Memory Bliss" | P.M. Dawn | |
| December 14 | "Change" | Lisa Stansfield | "Set Adrift On Memory Bliss" | P.M. Dawn | |
| December 21 | "It Should Have Been Me" | Adeva | "Set Adrift On Memory Bliss" | P.M. Dawn | |
| December 28 | "It Should Have Been Me" | Adeva | "Set Adrift On Memory Bliss" | P.M. Dawn | |

== See also ==
- 1991 in music
- List of Billboard Hot 100 number ones of 1991
