= 1991 MTV Video Music Awards =

Award ceremony

- Date: Thursday, September 5, 1991
- Location: Universal Amphitheatre, Los Angeles
- Country: United States
- Hosted by: Arsenio Hall
- Most awards: R.E.M. (6)
- Most nominations: R.E.M. (10)

Television/radio coverage
- Network: MTV
- Produced by: Doug Herzog; Judy McGrath; Gregory Sills
- Directed by: Bruce Gowers

The 1991 MTV Video Music Awards aired live on September 5, 1991, honoring the best music videos from June 2, 1990, to June 15, 1991. The show was hosted by Arsenio Hall at the Universal Amphitheatre in Los Angeles.

This year saw the introduction of a new category, Best Long Form Video; however, this category would not be handed out again until the 2016 ceremony where it was renamed Breakthrough Long Form Video. Meanwhile, the award for Best Post-Modern Video was renamed Best Alternative Video, and The Video Vanguard Award was renamed the Michael Jackson Video Vanguard Award in honor of Michael Jackson′s contributions to the culture of music videos.

R.E.M. led the night both in awards and in nominations. Their video for "Losing My Religion" not only won Video of the Year, but it also took home a total of six awards, making them the biggest winners of the night. Furthermore, R.E.M.'s ten nominations also made them the most nominated artist that night and "Losing My Religion" the most nominated video of the night.

== Pee-wee Herman ==
At the 1991 MTV Video Music Awards, Paul Reubens made his first public appearance after his arrest at an adult movie theater. Taking the stage in costume as Pee-wee, he asked the audience, "Heard any good jokes lately?" and received a standing ovation. Reubens responded with, "Ha, that's so funny I forgot to laugh!"

== Background ==
MTV announced on July 8 that the 1991 Video Music Awards would be held on September 5 at the Universal Amphitheatre in Los Angeles, with Arsenio Hall returning as host. Nominations were announced at a press conference hosted by Arsenio Hall on July 17. The ceremony broadcast was preceded by the 1991 MTV Video Music Awards Opening Act. Hosted by Kurt Loder and Tabitha Soren, the broadcast featured red carpet interviews and marked the first use of the Opening Act branding for the pre-show, which would continue through 2003. Following its initial MTV airing, the ceremony was syndicated to broadcast television.

== Performances ==
List of musical performances in order of appearance
Artist(s)	Song(s)	Ref.
Van Halen	"Poundcake"	
C+C Music Factory	Medley "Things That Make You Go Hmmm..." "Here We Go (Let's Rock & Roll)" "Gonna Make You Sweat (Everybody Dance Now)"	
Poison	"Talk Dirty to Me"	
Mariah Carey	"Emotions"	
EMF	"Unbelievable" (Note: live from the Town and Country Club in London)	
Paula Abdul	"Vibeology"	
Queensrÿche	"Silent Lucidity"	
LL Cool J	"Mama Said Knock You Out"	
Metallica	"Enter Sandman"	
Don Henley	"The Heart of the Matter"	
Guns N' Roses	"Live and Let Die" (Note: live from Wembley Stadium in London)	
Prince and The New Power Generation	"Gett Off"	

In addition, Was (Not Was) served as the house band.

== Presenters ==
- Pee-wee Herman – opened the show and welcomed the audience
- Linda Hamilton and Steven Tyler – presented Best Group Video
- Downtown Julie Brown – appeared in pre-commercial vignettes about the Viewer's Choice award and telling viewers what was 'coming up' on the show
- Christian Slater – presented Best Video from a Film
- Lenny Kravitz – presented Breakthrough Video
- Kurt Loder – interviewed various celebrities backstage before commercial breaks
- DJ Jazzy Jeff & The Fresh Prince – presented Best Dance Video
- Martha Quinn – appeared in pre-commercial vignettes telling viewers what was 'coming up' on the show
- Dennis Hopper – presented Best Direction in a Video
- Fred Savage – appeared in a backstage vignette with Pauly Shore
- Pauly Shore and Cindy Crawford – presented Best Long Form Video
- Color Me Badd – presented Best Choreography in a Video
- John Norris – appeared in a pre-commercial vignette telling viewers what was 'coming up' on the show
- Billy Idol – presented Best Alternative Video
- N.W.A – presented Best Rap Video
- Mike Myers and Dana Carvey (as Wayne and Garth from Wayne's World) – introduced the winners of the professional categories
- Jason Priestley and Jennifer Connelly – presented Best New Artist in a Video
- Ed Lover and Doctor Dré – appeared in a pre-commercial vignette telling viewers what was 'coming up' on the show
- Arsenio Hall (host) – presented the Video Vanguard award
- C.C. DeVille – appeared with Downtown Julie Brown before a commercial break to tell viewers what was 'coming up' on the show
- Pip Dann – announced the winner of the International Viewer's Choice Award for MTV Europe and introduced the other winners of the International Viewer's Choice Awards
- VJs Nonie (Asia), Richard Wilkins (Australia), Thunderbird (Brasil), Daisy Fuentes (Internacional) and Dionne Mitsuoka (Japan) – announced their respective region's Viewer's Choice winner
- James Brown and MC Hammer – presented a special Moonman to host Arsenio Hall for his four-year hosting stint and then presented the Viewer's Choice award
- Spinal Tap – presented Best Metal/Hard Rock Video
- Cher – presented Best Male Video and Best Female Video
- George Michael and Cindy Crawford – presented Video of the Year

== Winners and nominees ==
Nominations and winners, except for the Viewer's Choice awards, were selected by a panel of approximately 1,000 members of the music industry.

Winners are in bold text.

Video of the Year	Best Male Video
**R.E.M. – "Losing My Religion"**; C+C Music Factory – "Gonna Make You Sweat (Everybody Dance Now)"; Deee-Lite – "Groove Is in the Heart"; Divinyls – "I Touch Myself"; Chris Isaak – "Wicked Game (Concept)"; Queensrÿche – "Silent Lucidity"	**Chris Isaak – "Wicked Game (Concept)"**; Jon Bon Jovi – "Blaze of Glory"; Gerardo – "Rico Suave"; George Michael – "Freedom! '90"
Best Female Video	Best Group Video
**Janet Jackson – "Love Will Never Do (Without You)"**; Paula Abdul – "Rush Rush"; Neneh Cherry – "I've Got You Under My Skin"; Amy Grant – "Baby Baby"; Madonna – "Like a Virgin (Truth or Dare version)"	**R.E.M. – "Losing My Religion"**; The Black Crowes – "She Talks to Angels"; Divinyls – "I Touch Myself"; Queensrÿche – "Silent Lucidity"
Best New Artist in a Video	Best Metal/Hard Rock Video
**Jesus Jones – "Right Here, Right Now"**; C+C Music Factory – "Gonna Make You Sweat (Everybody Dance Now)"; Deee-Lite – "Groove Is in the Heart"; Gerardo – "Rico Suave"; Seal – "Crazy"	**Aerosmith – "The Other Side"**; AC/DC – "Thunderstruck"; Alice in Chains – "Man in the Box"; The Black Crowes – "She Talks to Angels"; Faith No More – "Falling to Pieces"; Guns N' Roses – "You Could Be Mine"; Queensrÿche – "Silent Lucidity"; Warrant – "Uncle Tom's Cabin"
Best Rap Video	Best Dance Video
**LL Cool J – "Mama Said Knock You Out"**; 3rd Bass – "Pop Goes the Weasel"; DJ Jazzy Jeff & The Fresh Prince – "Summertime"; Ice-T – "New Jack Hustler (Nino's Theme)"; Monie Love – "It's a Shame (My Sister)"	**C+C Music Factory – "Gonna Make You Sweat (Everybody Dance Now)"**; Bingoboys (featuring Princessa) – "How to Dance"; Deee-Lite – "Groove Is in the Heart"; EMF – "Unbelievable"
Best Alternative Video	Best Video from a Film
**Jane's Addiction – "Been Caught Stealing"**; Jesus Jones – "Right Here, Right Now"; R.E.M. – "Losing My Religion"; The Replacements – "When It Began"	**Chris Isaak – "Wicked Game" (from Wild at Heart)**; Bryan Adams – "(Everything I Do) I Do It for You" (from Robin Hood: Prince of Thieves); Jon Bon Jovi – "Blaze of Glory" (from Young Guns II); Guns N' Roses – "You Could Be Mine" (from Terminator 2: Judgment Day)
Best Long Form Video	Breakthrough Video
**Madonna – The Immaculate Collection**; Aerosmith – Things That Go Pump in the Night; Peter Gabriel – POV; R.E.M. – Tourfilm	**R.E.M. – "Losing My Religion"**; Deee-Lite – "Groove Is in the Heart"; Enigma – "Sadeness (Part I)"; Seal – "Crazy"
Best Direction in a Video	Best Choreography in a Video
**R.E.M. – "Losing My Religion" (Director: Tarsem)**; Chris Isaak – "Wicked Game (Concept)" (Director: Herb Ritts); George Michael – "Freedom! '90" (Director: David Fincher); Queensrÿche – "Silent Lucidity" (Director: Matt Mahurin)	**C+C Music Factory – "Gonna Make You Sweat (Everybody Dance Now)" (Choreographer: Jamale Graves)**; Janet Jackson – "Love Will Never Do (Without You)" (Choreographers: Herb Ritts, Janet Jackson and Tina Landon); Madonna – "Like a Virgin (Truth or Dare version)" (Choreographer: Vincent Paterson); MC Hammer – "Pray (Jam the Hammer Mix)" (Choreographers: MC Hammer and Ho Frat Hoo!)
Best Special Effects in a Video	Best Art Direction in a Video
**Faith No More – "Falling to Pieces" (Special Effects: David Faithfull and Ralph Ziman)**; Neneh Cherry – "I've Got You Under My Skin" (Special Effects: Pitov); MC Hammer – "Here Comes the Hammer" (Special Effects: Fred Raimondi and Maury Rosenfeld); The Replacements – "When It Began" (Special Effects: Carl Bressler and Paul Rachman); Seal – "Crazy" (Special Effects: Big TV!); Bart Simpson – "Do the Bartman" (Special Effects: Brad Bird)	**R.E.M. – "Losing My Religion" (Art Director: José Montaño)**; Edie Brickell & New Bohemians – "Mama Help Me" (Art Director: Leonardo); C+C Music Factory – "Things That Make You Go Hmmm..." (Art Director: Marcus Nispel); Faith No More – "Falling to Pieces" (Art Director: David Faithfull); Janet Jackson – "Love Will Never Do (Without You)" (Art Director: Pierluca De Carlo); Jellyfish – "The King Is Half-Undressed" (Art Director: Michael White); George Michael – "Freedom! '90" (Art Director: John Beard)
Best Editing in a Video	Best Cinematography in a Video
**R.E.M. – "Losing My Religion" (Editor: Robert Duffy)**; C+C Music Factory – "Gonna Make You Sweat (Everybody Dance Now)" (Editor: Marcus Nispel); Deee-Lite – "Groove Is in the Heart" (Editor: Hiroyuki Nakano); Chris Isaak – "Wicked Game (Concept)" (Editor: Bob Jenkis); George Michael – "Freedom! '90" (Editors: Jim Haygood and George Michael); Seal – "Crazy" (Editors: Big TV!)	**Chris Isaak – "Wicked Game (Concept)" (Director of Photography: Rolf Kestermann)**; LL Cool J – "Mama Said Knock You Out" (Director of Photography: Stephen Ashley Blake); George Michael – "Freedom! '90" (Director of Photography: Mike Southon); R.E.M. – "Losing My Religion" (Director of Photography: Larry Fong)
Viewer's Choice	International Viewer's Choice: MTV Asia
**Queensrÿche – "Silent Lucidity"**; C+C Music Factory – "Gonna Make You Sweat (Everybody Dance Now)"; Deee-Lite – "Groove Is in the Heart"; Divinyls – "I Touch Myself"; Chris Isaak – "Wicked Game (Concept)"; R.E.M. – "Losing My Religion"	**Cui Jian – "Wild in the Snow"**; Kenny Bee – "Be Brave to Love"; Bird – "Prik Kee Noo"; Chris Ho – "Fictional Stuff"
International Viewer's Choice: MTV Australia	International Viewer's Choice: MTV Brasil
**Yothu Yindi – "Treaty (Filthy Lucre Mix)"**; Crowded House – "Chocolate Cake"; Ratcat – "Don't Go Now"; Third Eye – "The Real Thing"	**Sepultura – "Orgasmatron"**; Cidade Negra – "Falar a Verdade"; Engenheiros do Hawaii – "Refrão de Bolero"; Kid Abelha – "Grand' Hotel"; Os Paralamas do Sucesso – "Caleidoscópio"
International Viewer's Choice: MTV Europe	International Viewer's Choice: MTV Internacional
**Roxette – "Joyride"**; EMF – "Unbelievable"; Pet Shop Boys – "Being Boring"; Seal – "Crazy"	**Franco De Vita – "No Basta"**; Emmanuel – "Bella Señora"; Juan Luis Guerra y 440 – "A Pedir Su Mano"; Los Prisioneros – "Estrechez de Corazón"
International Viewer's Choice: MTV Japan	
**Flipper's Guitar – "Groove Tube"**; no other nominees listed
Michael Jackson Video Vanguard Award
**Bon Jovi**; **Wayne Isham**

== Artists with multiple wins and nominations ==
Artists who received multiple awards
Wins	Artist
6	R.E.M.
3	Chris Isaak
2	C+C Music Factory

Artists who received multiple nominations
Nominations	Artist
10	R.E.M.
7	C+C Music Factory
7	Chris Isaak
6	Deee-Lite
5	George Michael
5	Seal
5	Queensrÿche
3	Divinyls
3	Faith No More
3	Janet Jackson
3	Madonna
2	Aerosmith
2	EMF
2	Gerardo
2	Guns N' Roses
2	Jesus Jones
2	Jon Bon Jovi
2	LL Cool J
2	MC Hammer
2	Neneh Cherry
2	The Black Crowes
2	The Replacements

== Music Videos with multiple wins and nominations ==
Music Videos that received multiple awards
Wins	Artist	Music Video
6	R.E.M.	"Losing My Religion"
3	Chris Isaak	"Wicked Game"
2	C+C Music Factory	"Gonna Make You Sweat (Everybody Dance Now)"

Music Videos that received multiple nominations
Nominations	Artist	Music Video
9	R.E.M.	"Losing My Religion"
7	Chris Isaak	"Wicked Game"
6	C+C Music Factory	"Gonna Make You Sweat (Everybody Dance Now)"
6	Deee-Lite	"Groove Is in the Heart"
5	George Michael	"Freedom! '90"
5	Queensrÿche	"Silent Lucidity"
5	Seal	"Crazy"
3	Divinyls	"I Touch Myself"
3	Faith No More	"Falling to Pieces"
3	Janet Jackson	"Love Will Never Do (Without You)"
2	EMF	"Unbelievable"
2	Gerardo	"Rico Suave"
2	Guns N' Roses	"You Could Be Mine"
2	Jesus Jones	"Right Here, Right Now"
2	Jon Bon Jovi	"Blaze of Glory"
2	LL Cool J	"Mama Said Knock You Out"
2	Madonna	"Like a Virgin" (Truth or Dare version)
2	Neneh Cherry	"I've Got You Under My Skin"
2	The Black Crowes	"She Talks to Angels"
2	The Replacements	"When It Began"
