= MTV Video Music Award for Best Dance =

Annual music video award

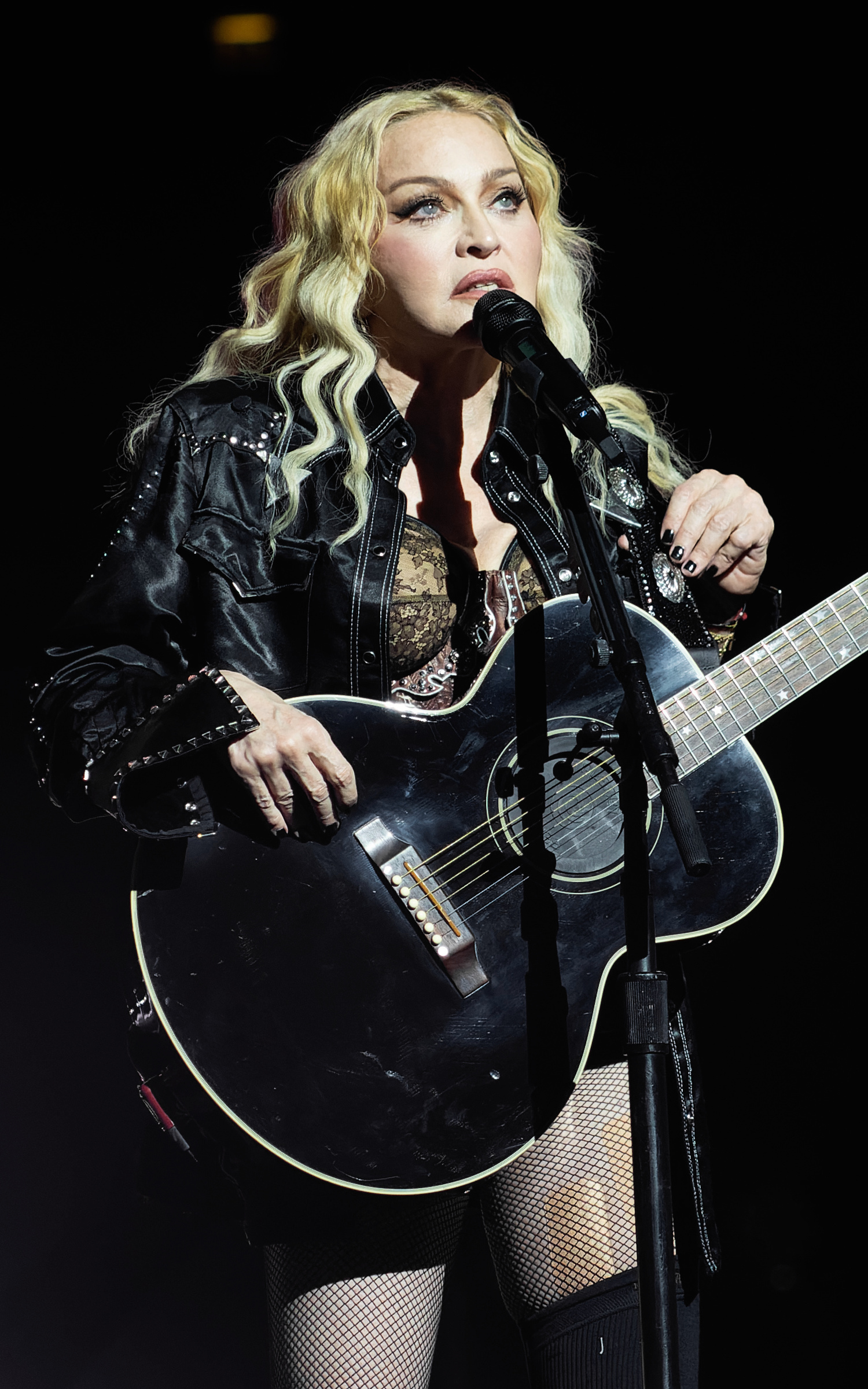
- Madonna is the most recent recipient for Confessions II – The Film
- Awarded for: quality dance/electronic music videos
- Country: United States
- Presented by: MTV
- First award: 1989
- Currently held by: Madonna – Confessions II – The Film (2026)

Highlights
- Most wins: En Vogue, The Pussycat Dolls, Calvin Harris & Zedd (2)
- Most nominations: Madonna (7)
- Website: VMA website

The MTV Video Music Award for Best Dance is given at the annual MTV Video Music Award. The category was first awarded in 1989, and it was one of the original four genre categories that were added to the MTV Video Music Awards that year.

With a revamp of the awards in 2007, the category was cut out along with several others, yet it returned for the 2008 awards, where it was given a new name: Best Dancing in a Video. In 2009 the award for Best Dancing was again eliminated from the VMAs, but it was revived again in 2010 as Best Dance Music Video. The following year, though, the award was once again absent from the category list. Once again, the award was revived in 2012, this time under the name of Best Electronic Dance Music Video, celebrating the rise in popularity of EDM throughout the year. It was again eliminated from the 2013 awards. On July 17, 2014, MTV brought the category back, this time renaming it the MTV Clubland Award for the 2014 Awards. The pattern of awarding the Moonman every other year continued in 2016 where the award was renamed Best Electronic Video. Finally, in 2017 this award's name was changed to Best Dance, which it has kept until the present. It was again eliminated from the 2020 awards before returning in 2026.

En Vogue, The Pussycat Dolls, Calvin Harris and Zedd are the category's biggest winners, with each having won it twice. Madonna is the most nominated artist, having been nominated seven times for this category; followed by Janet Jackson, who has been nominated six times.

== Recipients ==
=== 1980s ===
Recipients
Year (Note: Each year is linked to the article about the MTV Video Music Awards held that year.)	Winner(s)	Video	Nominees	Ref.
1989	Paula Abdul	"Straight Up"	Bobby Brown — "Every Little Step"; Michael Jackson — "Smooth Criminal"; Jody Watley — "Real Love"	

=== 1990s ===
Recipients
Year	Winner(s)	Video	Nominees	Ref.
1990	MC Hammer	"U Can't Touch This"	Paula Abdul — "Opposites Attract"; Janet Jackson — "Rhythm Nation"; Madonna — "Vogue"	
1991	C+C Music Factory	"Gonna Make You Sweat (Everybody Dance Now)"	Bingoboys (featuring Princessa) — "How to Dance"; Deee-Lite — "Groove Is in the Heart"; EMF — "Unbelievable"	
1992	Prince and the New Power Generation	"Cream"	En Vogue — "My Lovin' (You're Never Gonna Get It)"; Madonna — "Holiday (Truth or Dare version)"; Marky Mark and the Funky Bunch — "Good Vibrations"	
1993	En Vogue	"Free Your Mind"	Janet Jackson — "That's the Way Love Goes"; RuPaul — "Supermodel"; Stereo MCs — "Connected"	
1994	Salt-n-Pepa with En Vogue	"Whatta Man"	En Vogue — "Runaway Love"; Janet Jackson — "If"; Us3 — "Cantaloop (Flip Fantasia)"; Crystal Waters — "100% Pure Love"	
1995	Michael Jackson and Janet Jackson	"Scream"	Paula Abdul — "My Love Is for Real"; C+C Music Factory — "Do You Wanna Get Funky"; Montell Jordan — "This Is How We Do It"; Madonna — "Human Nature"; Salt-n-Pepa — "None of Your Business"	
1996	Coolio	"1, 2, 3, 4 (Sumpin' New)"	Everything but the Girl — "Missing"; La Bouche — "Be My Lover"; George Michael — "Fastlove"	
1997	Spice Girls	"Wannabe"	The Chemical Brothers — "Block Rockin' Beats"; Freak Nasty — "Da' Dip"; The Prodigy — "Breathe"	
1998	The Prodigy	"Smack My Bitch Up"	Backstreet Boys — "Everybody (Backstreet's Back)"; Janet Jackson — "Together Again"; Madonna — "Ray of Light"; Will Smith — "Gettin' Jiggy wit It"	
1999	Ricky Martin	"Livin' la Vida Loca"	Cher — "Believe"; Fatboy Slim — "Praise You"; Jordan Knight — "Give It to You"; Jennifer Lopez — "If You Had My Love"	

=== 2000s ===
Recipients
Year	Winner(s)	Video	Nominees	Ref.
2000	Jennifer Lopez	"Waiting for Tonight"	Ricky Martin — "Shake Your Bon-Bon"; NSYNC — "Bye Bye Bye"; Sisqó — "Thong Song"; Britney Spears — "(You Drive Me) Crazy"	
2001	NSYNC	"Pop"	Christina Aguilera, Lil' Kim, Mýa and P!nk (featuring Missy Elliott) — "Lady Marmalade"; Fatboy Slim — "Weapon of Choice"; Janet Jackson — "All for You"; Jennifer Lopez — "Love Don't Cost a Thing"	
2002	P!nk	"Get the Party Started"	Dirty Vegas — "Days Go By"; Kylie Minogue — "Can't Get You Out of My Head"; Shakira — "Whenever, Wherever"; Britney Spears — "I'm a Slave 4 U"	
2003	Justin Timberlake	"Rock Your Body"	Christina Aguilera (featuring Redman) — "Dirrty"; Jennifer Lopez — "I'm Glad"; Mýa — "My Love Is Like...Wo"; Sean Paul — "Get Busy"	
2004	Usher (featuring Lil Jon and Ludacris)	"Yeah!"	Beyoncé — "Naughty Girl"; The Black Eyed Peas — "Hey Mama"; Missy Elliott — "I'm Really Hot"; Britney Spears — "Toxic"	
2005	Missy Elliott (featuring Ciara and Fatman Scoop)	"Lose Control"	Ciara (featuring Missy Elliott) — "1, 2 Step"; Destiny's Child — "Lose My Breath"; Jennifer Lopez — "Get Right"; Shakira (featuring Alejandro Sanz) — "La Tortura"	
2006	The Pussycat Dolls (featuring Snoop Dogg)	"Buttons"	Nelly Furtado (featuring Timbaland) — "Promiscuous"; Madonna — "Hung Up"; Sean Paul — "Temperature"; Shakira (featuring Wyclef Jean) — "Hips Don't Lie"	
2007	—N/a			
2008	The Pussycat Dolls	"When I Grow Up"	Chris Brown — "Forever"; Danity Kane — "Damaged"; Madonna (featuring Justin Timberlake and Timbaland) — "4 Minutes"; Ne-Yo — "Closer"	
2009	—N/a			

=== 2010s ===
Recipients
Year	Winner(s)	Video	Nominees	Ref.
2010	Lady Gaga	"Bad Romance"	Cascada — "Evacuate the Dancefloor"; David Guetta (featuring Akon) — "Sexy Chick"; Enrique Iglesias (featuring Pitbull) — "I Like It"; Usher (featuring will.i.am) — "OMG"	
2011	—N/a			
2012	Calvin Harris	"Feel So Close"	Avicii — "Le7els"; Duck Sauce — "Big Bad Wolf"; Skrillex — "First of the Year (Equinox)"; Martin Solveig — "The Night Out"	
2013	—N/a			
2014	Zedd (featuring Hayley Williams)	"Stay the Night"	Disclosure — "Grab Her!"; DJ Snake and Lil Jon — "Turn Down for What"; Martin Garrix — "Animals"; Calvin Harris — "Summer"	
2015	—N/a			
2016	Calvin Harris and Disciples	"How Deep is Your Love"	99 Souls (featuring Destiny's Child and Brandy) — "The Girl is Mine"; Afrojack — "SummerThing!"; The Chainsmokers (featuring Daya) — "Don't Let Me Down"; Mike Posner — "I Took a Pill in Ibiza"	
2017	Zedd and Alessia Cara	"Stay"	Afrojack (featuring Ty Dolla Sign) — "Gone"; Calvin Harris — "My Way"; Kygo and Selena Gomez — "It Ain't Me"; Major Lazer (featuring Justin Bieber and MØ) — "Cold Water"	
2018	Avicii (featuring Rita Ora)	"Lonely Together"	The Chainsmokers – "Everybody Hates Me"; David Guetta and Sia – "Flames"; Calvin Harris and Dua Lipa – "One Kiss"; Marshmello (featuring Khalid) – "Silence"; Zedd and Liam Payne – "Get Low"	
2019	The Chainsmokers (featuring Bebe Rexha)	"Call You Mine"	Clean Bandit (featuring Demi Lovato) – "Solo"; DJ Snake (featuring Selena Gomez, Ozuna and Cardi B) – "Taki Taki"; David Guetta, Bebe Rexha and J Balvin – "Say My Name"; Marshmello and Bastille – "Happier"; Silk City and Dua Lipa (featuring Diplo and Mark Ronson) – "Electricity"	

=== 2020s ===
Recipients
Year	Winner(s)	Video	Nominees	Ref.
2020 – 2025	—N/a			
2026	Madonna	Confessions II – The Film	Bebe Rexha and Faithless – "New Religion"; Harry Styles – "Aperture"; Lady Gaga and Doechii – "Runway"; PinkPantheress and Zara Larsson – "Stateside"; Slayyyter – "Dance..."; Tate McRae – "Nobody's Girl"	

== Statistics ==
=== Artists with multiple wins ===
2 wins

- Calvin Harris
- En Vogue
- The Pussycat Dolls
- Zedd

=== Artists with multiple nominations ===
7 nominations

- Madonna

6 nominations

- Janet Jackson

5 nominations

- Calvin Harris
- Jennifer Lopez

4 nominations

- En Vogue
- Missy Elliott (Note: 2 as a featured artist.)
- Bebe Rexha

3 nominations

- Britney Spears
- Paula Abdul
- David Guetta
- Shakira
- The Chainsmokers
- Zedd
- Lady Gaga

2 nominations

- Afrojack
- Avicii
- C+C Music Factory
- Christina Aguilera
- Ciara (Note: 1 as a featured artist.)
- Destiny's Child
- DJ Snake
- Dua Lipa
- Fatboy Slim
- Justin Timberlake
- Lil Jon
- Marshmello
- Michael Jackson
- Mýa
- NSYNC
- Pink
- Ricky Martin
- Salt-n-Pepa
- Sean Paul
- Selena Gomez
- The Prodigy
- The Pussycat Dolls
- Timbaland (Note: Both as a featured artist.)
- Usher

== See also ==
- MTV Europe Music Award for Best Electronic
