= Just a Touch of Love (song) =

1991 single by C+C Music Factory

Single by C+C Music Factory

from the album Gonna Make You Sweat
- Released: August 15, 1991
- Genre: House
- Length: 5:38
- Label: Columbia
- Songwriter: Robert Clivillés
- Producers: Robert Clivillés; David Cole

C+C Music Factory singles chronology
"Things That Make You Go Hmmm..." (1991)	"Just a Touch of Love" (1991)	"Keep It Comin' (Dance Till You Can't Dance No More)" (1992)

Music video
- "Just a Touch of Love" on YouTube

"Just a Touch of Love" is a song written by Robert Clivillés and performed by American musical group C+C Music Factory. Also known as "Just a Touch of Love (Everyday)", it was released in August 1991 by Columbia Records as the fourth single from their debut album, Gonna Make You Sweat (1990). It became the group's fourth number one on the US Billboard Dance Club Play chart. On other US charts, the song reached number 50 on the Billboard Hot 100 and number 83 on the Billboard Hot R&B Singles chart.

== Critical reception ==
Jose F. Promis from AllMusic described "Just a Touch of Love" as "a sleek, elegant, straight-up house jam sans rap". Clark and DeVaney from Cash Box stated that it "has the commercial/dance sound that is in much demand and has already been proven to be successful." Pan-European magazine Music & Media commented, "More dance from American groove masters C&C. Just a touch of rap and a little bit of scratching are covered in soulful and meaty vocals. Slightly reminiscent of the '70s, there are echoes of Chic, among others." Marc Andrews from Smash Hits wrote, "Here the C&Cs shamelessly steal large portions from Mads' most brilliant effort ["Vogue"] but most significantly, Freedom Williams doesn't even get a rap look-in. There's just Zelma with her dangerously over-ironed tresses screeching her lungs out."

== Charts ==
=== Weekly charts ===
Chart (1991)	Peak position
Australia (ARIA)	26
Canada Dance/Urban (RPM)	1
Europe (European Dance Radio)	8
Europe (European Hit Radio)	32
Finland (Suomen virallinen lista)	18
Netherlands (Dutch Top 40 Tipparade)	2
Netherlands (Single Top 100)	47
New Zealand (Recorded Music NZ)	21
Switzerland (Schweizer Hitparade)	21
UK Singles (Official Charts)	31
UK Airplay (Music Week)	28
UK Dance (Music Week)	10
UK Club Chart (Record Mirror)	5
US Billboard Hot 100	50
US Dance Club Play (Billboard)	1
US Hot R&B Singles (Billboard)	83
US Cash Box Top 100	65

=== Year-end charts ===
Chart (1991)	Position
UK Club Chart (Record Mirror)	57

== Release history ==
Region	Date	Format(s)	Label(s)	Ref.
Europe	August 15, 1991	7-inch vinyl	Columbia	
Japan	October 25, 1991	Mini-CD (with "Gonna Make You Sweat")	Sony	
United Kingdom	November 11, 1991	7-inch vinyl; 12-inch vinyl; CD; cassette	Columbia	
Australia	November 25, 1991	12-inch vinyl; CD; cassette	Columbia	

== In popular culture ==
- "Just a Touch of Love" was featured in the 1992 film Sister Act and in the second season of the 2018 television series Pose.

== See also ==
- List of number-one dance singles of 1992 (U.S.)
