= How to Dance =

1990 single by Bingoboys

Single by Bingoboys featuring Princessa

from the album The Best of Bingoboys
- Released: 1990
- Genre: Dance; hip house
- Length: 3:46
- Label: Atlantic
- Songwriters: Bingoboys (Klaus Biedermann, Paul Pfab, Helmut Wolfgruber)
- Producer: Martin Neumayer

Bingoboys singles chronology
"How to Dance" (1990)	"Borrowed Love" (1991)

Princessa singles chronology
"How to Dance" (1991)	"Rojo Y Llanto" (1993)

"How to Dance" is a song by Austrian house music trio Bingoboys from their debut studio album, The Best of Bingoboys (1991). The song features American female rapper Princessa and was first released in the United States in 1990, then was given a European and Australian release in March 1991.

"How to Dance" peaked at number two in Austria and reached the top 10 in Australia, Denmark, Finland, and the Netherlands. In the US, it climbed to number 25 on the Billboard Hot 100 and topped the Billboard Dance Club Play chart for one week in March 1991. The music video for the song was nominated for an MTV Video Music Award in the category of "Best Dance Video", losing to "Gonna Make You Sweat (Everybody Dance Now)" by the C+C Music Factory.

== Composition ==
The song borrows heavily from a number of earlier recordings, including "Dance, Dance, Dance (Yowsah, Yowsah, Yowsah)" by the band Chic, "Dance (Disco Heat)" by the disco singer Sylvester, "Kiss" by Art of Noise feat. Tom Jones, the popular James Brown "Yeah! Woo!" sample loop, the bassline motif from Mantronix's single "Got to Have Your Love", and a synth motif from The Whispers' "And the Beat Goes On". In addition, the song contains audio samples from an instructional recording from the 1970s that attempted to teach people "how to dance" (for example, Step left, around, and together with the right).

== Charts ==
=== Weekly charts ===
Chart (1991)	Peak position
Australia (ARIA)	3
Austria (Ö3 Austria Top 40)	2
Belgium (Ultratop 50 Flanders)	30
Canada Dance/Urban (RPM)	3
Denmark (IFPI)	8
Europe (Eurochart Hot 100)	24
Finland (Suomen virallinen lista)	4
Germany (GfK)	22
Netherlands (Dutch Top 40)	9
Netherlands (Single Top 100)	7
New Zealand (Recorded Music NZ)	37
Sweden (Sverigetopplistan)	30
Switzerland (Schweizer Hitparade)	11
UK Singles (Official Charts)	93
UK Airplay (Music Week)	59
US Billboard Hot 100	25
US 12-inch Singles Sales (Billboard)	4
US Dance Club Play (Billboard)	1
US Cash Box Top 100	32

=== Year-end charts ===
Chart (1991)	Position
Australia (ARIA)	53
Austria (Ö3 Austria Top 40)	17
Canada Dance/Urban (RPM)	18
Netherlands (Single Top 100)	84
US 12-inch Singles Sales (Billboard)	31
US Dance Club Play (Billboard)	29

== Release history ==
Region	Date	Format(s)	Label(s)	Ref.
United States	1990	12-inch vinyl; cassette	Atlantic	
United Kingdom	11 March 1991	7-inch vinyl; 12-inch vinyl; CD; cassette	Atlantic	
Australia	25 March 1991	12-inch vinyl; cassette	Atlantic	
Australia	22 April 1991	CD	Atlantic	

== See also ==
- List of number-one dance singles of 1991 (U.S.)
