= Gonna Make You Sweat =

Studio album by C+C Music Factory
- Released: December 18, 1990
- Recorded: 1989–1990
- Studios: Unique Recording Studios, New York City
- Genres: Hip house; dance; pop
- Length: 66:17
- Label: Columbia
- Producers: David Cole; Robert Clivillés; Freedom Williams; Larry Yasga

C+C Music Factory chronology
Gonna Make You Sweat (1990)	Anything Goes! (1994)

Singles from Gonna Make You Sweat
- 1. "Gonna Make You Sweat (Everybody Dance Now)" Released: November 18, 1990; 2. "Here We Go (Let's Rock & Roll)" Released: March 3, 1991; 3. "Things That Make You Go Hmmm..." Released: June 23, 1991; 4. "Just a Touch of Love" Released: August 15, 1991

Gonna Make You Sweat is the debut studio album by American musical production group C+C Music Factory, released in the US on December 18, 1990 by Columbia Records. Following on the success of contemporaries Black Box and Technotronic, Gonna Make You Sweat was a worldwide smash, reaching number two on the US Billboard 200.

The album's first single "Gonna Make You Sweat (Everybody Dance Now)" reached number one on the US Billboard Hot 100 for two weeks in February 1991. The song also reached number one on Billboard's Top R&B Singles, Dance Club, and Dance Singles charts, as well as number three on the Australian ARIA Singles chart and UK Singles Chart.

Subsequent singles "Here We Go (Let's Rock & Roll)" and "Things That Make You Go Hmmm..." both became top-five entries on the Billboard Hot 100.

== Reception ==
Professional ratings
Review scores
Source	Rating
AllMusic	4.5/5 stars
Calgary Herald	B+
Robert Christgau	(3-star Honorable Mention)
The Encyclopedia of Popular Music	3/5 stars
Entertainment Weekly	B+
NME	6/10
People	(favorable)
The Rolling Stone Album Guide	3/5 stars
Select	2/5

The album received generally mixed reviews from critics. James Muretich from Calgary Herald wrote, "From the title track to "Things That Make You Go Hmmm..." (a nod here to TV talk show host Arsenio Hall), the music is irresistibly infectious to anyone the least susceptible to dancin' the night away. C+C Music Factory cleverly snatch melodic lines from people like Suzanne Vega while also providing a few riffs of their own, especially those of guitarist Paul Pesco. The lyrics also avoid crotch-rap cliches. C+C Music Factory is destined to become this year's dance hit factory." Marisa Fox from Entertainment Weekly felt that "this high-energy album has all the makings of a dance-club hit." She added that it's "a lot of fun — and it does live up to its name." In a contemporary review, Select stated that "For every might tune like the title track, there's an over-long muddled "What's This Word Called Love?" and "the producers knack of building indestructible house beats is matched only by their inconsistency". The review concluded that the songs were over-long and have trouble sustaining interest."

== Track listing ==
Side A
No.	Title	Writer(s)	Vocals	Length
1.	"Gonna Make You Sweat (Everybody Dance Now)"	Robert Clivillés; Fredrick B. Williams	Martha Wash; Freedom Williams	4:06
2.	"Here We Go (Let's Rock & Roll)"	Clivillés; Williams	Williams	5:42
3.	"Things That Make You Go Hmmm..."	Clivillés; Williams	Williams	5:23
4.	"Just a Touch of Love (Everyday)"	Clivillés	Zelma Davis	5:38
5.	"A Groove of Love (What's This Word Called Love?)"	Clivillés; Williams	Davis; Williams	10:00

Side B
No.	Title	Writer(s)	Vocals	Length
6.	"Live Happy"	David Cole	Davis	7:22
7.	"Oooh Baby"	Cole	Cole	4:53
8.	"Let's Get Funkee"	Cole	Davis	4:29
9.	"Givin' It to You"	Cole	Cole	4:52
10.	"Bang That Beat"	Cole; Williams	Williams	5:35

CD and cassette hidden track
No.	Title	Writer(s)	Length
11.	"Shade"	Cole	8:17

== Personnel ==
- Deborah Cooper, Zelma Davis, Martha Wash, Freedom Williams, David Cole, Karen Bernod, Craig Derry, Yolanda Lee, Duran Ramos, Norma Jean Wright – lead and backing vocals
- Robert Clivillés – keyboards, synthesizers, keyboard & synth programming, percussion, drum programming, backing vocals
- David Cole – keyboards, backing vocals
- Ricky Crespo – keyboards
- Alan Friedman – keyboards, synthesizers, drums, percussion
- Hugh McCracken – harmonica
- Paul Pesco – guitars

=== Production ===
- Arranged and produced by David Cole, Robert Clivillés, Freedom Williams and Larry Yasgar
- Recorded and engineered by Rodney Ascue, Alec Head, Acar S. Key and Tony Maserati
- Assistant engineers: Paul Berry, Bruce Calder, John Parthum, Steve Wellner
- Mixed by Acar S. Key and Bob Rosa

== Charts ==
=== Weekly charts ===
Weekly chart performance for Gonna Make You Sweat
Chart (1991)	Peak position
Australian Albums (ARIA)	7
Austrian Albums (Ö3 Austria)	26
Canada Top Albums/CDs (RPM)	5
Dutch Albums (Album Top 100)	59
German Albums (Offizielle Top 100)	30
New Zealand Albums (RMNZ)	3
Swedish Albums (Sverigetopplistan)	30
Swiss Albums (Schweizer Hitparade)	13
UK Albums (Official Charts)	8
US Billboard 200	2
US Top R&B/Hip-Hop Albums (Billboard)	11

=== Year-end charts ===
1991 Year-end chart performance for Gonna Make You Sweat
Chart (1991)	Position
Australia (ARIA)	50
Canada Top Albums/CDs (RPM)	16
US Billboard 200	4
US Top R&B/Hip-Hop Albums (Billboard)	20

1992 Year-end chart performance for Gonna Make You Sweat
Chart (1992)	Position
US Billboard 200	71

== Certifications ==
Certifications for Gonna Make You Sweat
Region	Certification	Certified units/sales
Australia (ARIA)	Platinum	70,000^{^}
Canada (Music Canada)	4× Platinum	400,000^{^}
Japan (RIAJ)	Platinum	200,000^{^}
New Zealand (RMNZ)	Platinum	15,000^{^}
United Kingdom (BPI)	Gold	100,000^{^}
United States (RIAA)	5× Platinum	5,000,000^{^}
^{^} Shipments figures based on certification alone.
