= Zelma Davis =

Liberian-born American singer-songwriter

- Born: August 2, 1970 (age 56); Liberia
- Genres: R&B, house, dance, pop
- Occupations: Singer, songwriter, actress
- Instrument: Vocals
- Years active: 1989–present
- Label: Columbia
- Spouse: Brandon Himmel

Zelma Davis is a Liberian-born American singer and songwriter. She is primarily known for her number-one dance hits "Things That Make You Go Hmmm..." and "Here We Go (Let's Rock & Roll)" with C+C Music Factory, as well as for her presence as the ostensible singer in the music video of the latter's international club hit "Gonna Make You Sweat (Everybody Dance Now)". She has won four American Music Awards, five Billboard Music Awards, two MTV Video Music Awards, and a Grammy Award nomination with the group.

== Career ==
Upon C+C Music Factory's emergence onto the scene in late 1990, Davis was marketed as the principal vocalist of the ensemble—despite there having been several other female vocalists, in addition to her, who had provided the vocals to various tracks on the group's debut album, Gonna Make You Sweat. Davis appeared in the music video for the album's number-one Hot 100-charting title track, where she lip-synched to vocals which had, in fact, been sung by Martha Wash.

Wash (who had also provided vocals to Black Box during the same period, and also saw that group use models to lip-sync to her voice in the music videos) did not appreciate the perception of Davis being the voice behind the hit song, and proceeded to file a lawsuit against the group. With this happening during the height of the Milli Vanilli lip-synching scandal, Davis found herself being accused of being a "no talent" who was being featured by the group only because of her looks – despite her having actually performed a number of songs on their studio album Gonna Make You Sweat.

In 1992, she made an appearance on the American sitcom Blossom. In 1993, Davis performed a rendition of Dennis Edwards's song "Don't Look Any Further" for Dave Koz's album Lucky Man. In 1994, Davis reunited with C+C Music Factory to record their second album, Anything Goes!. The album's lead single "Do You Wanna Get Funky", which featured Davis and Martha Wash, peaked at number-one on Billboard's Dance chart. Davis also appears on the song "I Found Love".

In 1997, she released a song titled "I'm Calling (Say It Loud)" on the soundtrack for the documentary film, When We Were Kings. In 2000, Davis released a single titled "Power", which peaked at number-one on Billboard's Hot Dance Maxi-Singles Sales chart.

In June 2008, Davis appeared on DJ Heavygrinder's single "Mind Reader". In August 2008, Davis and Amber released a remake of Donna Summer and Barbra Streisand's "No More Tears (Enough Is Enough)". In 2009, she released another single with DJ Heavygrinder titled "Chains of Love". In 2010, she released three singles: "Free Love", "Touch the Sky", and "Summer of Love".

In January 2015, she released a single with Dank titled "1994 (Rhythm Is Right)". In 2017, Davis appeared in the TV series Dr. Ken.

== Personal life ==
She and her husband Brandon Himmel have two daughters together, one of whom is actress Arica Himmel.

== Discography ==
=== Singles ===
Title	Year	Peak chart positions												Certifications	Album
Title	Year	US	US R&B	US Dance	BEL	CAN	FIN	GER	IRE	NLD	NZ	SWI	UK	Certifications	Album
"Here We Go (Let's Rock & Roll)" (with C+C Music Factory)	1991	3	7	1	21	1	16	14	19	15	9	11	20	RIAA: Gold	Gonna Make You Sweat
"Things That Make You Go Hmmm..." (with C+C Music Factory)	1991	4	31	1	—	1	10	27	9	19	2	15	4	RIAA: Gold	Gonna Make You Sweat
"Just a Touch of Love" (with C+C Music Factory)	1991	50	83	1	—	—	—	—	17	47	21	21	31		Gonna Make You Sweat
"Do You Wanna Get Funky" (with C+C Music Factory, Martha Wash, and Trilogy)	1994	40	11	1	38	1	—	41	—	18	2	—	27		Anything Goes!
"I Found Love" (with C+C Music Factory)	1995	—	—	13	—	—	—	—	—	—	—	—	26		Anything Goes!
"Power"	2000	—	—	1	—	—	—	—	—	—	—	—	—		Non-album single
"Mind Reader" (DJ Heavygrinder featuring Zelma Davis)	2008	—	—	—	—	—	—	—	—	—	—	—	—		Non-album single
"No More Tears (Enough Is Enough)" (with Amber)	2008	—	—	—	—	—	—	—	—	—	—	—	—		Non-album single
"Chains of Love" (DJ Heavygrinder featuring Zelma Davis)	2009	—	—	—	—	—	—	—	—	—	—	—	—		Non-album single
"Free Love"	2010	—	—	—	—	—	—	—	—	—	—	—	—		Non-album single
"Touch the Sky"	2010	—	—	—	—	—	—	—	—	—	—	—	—		Non-album single
"Summer of Love"	2010	—	—	—	—	—	—	—	—	—	—	—	—		Non-album single
"1994 (Rhythm Is Right)" (with Dank)	2015	—	—	—	—	—	—	—	—	—	—	—	—		Non-album single

== Awards and nominations ==
American Music Awards

Year	Nominated Work	Category	Result
1992	"C+C Music Factory"	Favorite Pop/Rock Band/Duo/Group	Won
1992	"C+C Music Factory"	Favorite Pop/Rock New Artist	Won
1992	"C+C Music Factory"	Favorite Dance New Artist	Won
1992	"C+C Music Factory"	Favorite Dance Artist	Won

Grammy Music Awards

Year	Nominated Work	Category	Result
1991	"C+C Music Factory"	Best New Artist	Nominated

MTV Video Music Awards

Year	Nominated Work	Category	Result
1991	"Gonna Make You Sweat (Everybody Dance Now)"	Best Dance Video	Won
1991	"Gonna Make You Sweat (Everybody Dance Now)"	Best Choreography in a Video	Won
1991	"Gonna Make You Sweat (Everybody Dance Now)"	Video of the Year	Nominated
1991	"Gonna Make You Sweat (Everybody Dance Now)"	Best New Artist in a Video	Nominated
1991	"Gonna Make You Sweat (Everybody Dance Now)"	Viewer's Choice	Nominated
1991	"Things That Make You Go Hmmm..."	Best Art Direction in a Video	Nominated

- Note: These are nominations Davis shares with C+C Music Factory.

== See also ==
- List of number-one dance hits (United States)
- List of artists who reached number one on the U.S. Dance chart
