= Here We Go (Let's Rock & Roll) =

1991 single by C+C Music Factory

Single by C+C Music Factory presents Freedom Williams and Zelma Davis

from the album Gonna Make You Sweat
- Released: February 13, 1991
- Genre: Techno; hip-hop; funk; rock
- Length: 5:42
- Label: Columbia
- Songwriters: Robert Clivillés; Freedom Williams
- Producers: Robert Clivillés; David Cole

C+C Music Factory singles chronology
"Gonna Make You Sweat (Everybody Dance Now)" (1990)	"Here We Go (Let's Rock & Roll)" (1991)	"Things That Make You Go Hmmm..." (1991)

Music video
- "Here We Go (Let's Rock & Roll)" on YouTube

"Here We Go (Let's Rock & Roll)" is a song by American dance music group C+C Music Factory, released on February 13, 1991, by Columbia Records as the second single from their debut album, Gonna Make You Sweat (1990). The song was written by Robert Clivillés and Freedom Williams, and produced by Clivillés and David Cole. It was a success in the United States, reaching number three on the Billboard Hot 100, number seven on the Billboard Hot R&B Singles chart, and number one on the Billboard 12-inch Singles Sales and Dance Club Play charts. In Europe, the single reached number 20 on the UK Singles Chart and number five on the Music Week Dance Singles chart. It was certified gold by the Recording Industry Association of America (RIAA) for shipments of over 500,000 copies.

== Critical reception ==
AllMusic editor Jose F. Promis declared "Here We Go (Let's Rock & Roll)" as "anthemic", noting further that it "melded house, hip-hop, and rock". Larry Flick from Billboard magazine named it an "frenetic hip-hop anthem, covered with white-hot metal guitar riffs and rapid-fire rhyming by Freedom Williams". Marisa Fox from Entertainment Weekly described it as a "jumpy track complete with an electric-guitar intro". Pan-European magazine Music & Media stated, "Gonna make you sweat again. Their grooves are just right. Presenting Freedom Williams and Zelma Davis, C+C will be the chartbusters of 1991."

James Hamilton from Music Week called the track a "lurching jitterer". People Magazine wrote that it is "tough funk, like a bastard child of Eddie Van Halen and the Staple Singers. Throughout, synthesizer bullets shoot at your feet until you dance." Jack Barron from Record Mirror felt that Williams "jabs his rap through this current club favourite with all the aplomb of a pit bull greeting a poodle", adding that it is "replete with every kind of dance hook".

== Charts ==
=== Weekly charts ===
Chart (1991)	Peak position
Australia (ARIA)	20
Austria (Ö3 Austria Top 40)	24
Belgium (Ultratop 50 Flanders)	27
Canada Top Singles (RPM)	11
Canada Dance/Urban (RPM)	1
Europe (Eurochart Hot 100)	35
Finland (Suomen virallinen lista)	16
Germany (GfK)	14
Ireland (IRMA)	18
Israel (Israeli Singles Chart)	14
Japan (Oricon)	23
Netherlands (Dutch Top 40)	14
Netherlands (Single Top 100)	15
New Zealand (Recorded Music NZ)	9
Spain (AFYVE)	4
Sweden (Sverigetopplistan)	33
Switzerland (Schweizer Hitparade)	11
UK Singles (Official Charts)	20
UK Airplay (Music Week)	21
UK Dance (Music Week)	5
UK Club Chart (Record Mirror)	4
US Billboard Hot 100	3
US 12-inch Singles Sales (Billboard)	1
US Dance Club Play (Billboard)	1
US Hot R&B Singles (Billboard)	7
US Cash Box Top 100	1

=== Year-end charts ===
Chart (1991)	Position
Canada Top Singles (RPM)	76
Canada Dance/Urban (RPM)	1
New Zealand (RIANZ)	39
UK Club Chart (Record Mirror)	39
US Billboard Hot 100	36
US 12-inch Singles Sales (Billboard)	10
US Dance Club Play (Billboard)	7
US Hot R&B Singles (Billboard)	94
US Cash Box Top 100	28

== Certifications ==
Region	Certification	Certified units/sales
United States (RIAA)	Gold	500,000^{^}
^{^} Shipments figures based on certification alone.

== Release history ==
Region	Date	Format(s)	Label(s)	Ref.
United States	February 13, 1991	7-inch vinyl; 12-inch vinyl; CD; cassette	Columbia	
United Kingdom	March 18, 1991	7-inch vinyl; 12-inch vinyl; CD; cassette	Columbia	
Australia	March 25, 1991	12-inch vinyl; CD; cassette	Columbia	
Japan	April 25, 1991	CD	Sony	

== See also ==
- List of number-one dance singles of 1991 (U.S.)
