= Freedom Williams =

American singer, songwriter, and music engineer

- Born: Frederick Brandon Williams; February 13, 1966 (age 60); Brooklyn, New York, United States
- Genres: Hip-hop, dance
- Occupations: Rapper; singer; songwriter
- Years active: 1983–present
- Labels: Columbia Records (1993–1997); RMD Entertainment/Mega Bop (2004–present)
- Formerly of: C+C Music Factory
- Website: MySpace account

Frederick Brandon "Freedom" Williams (born February 13, 1966) is an American rapper, singer and songwriter, who gained fame as the lead rapper on C+C Music Factory's biggest hits.

== Career ==
Born in Brooklyn in 1966, Williams went to school to become an audio engineer and worked as a janitor at New York's Quad Recording Studios. At the time, Robert Clivillés and David Cole frequently used this studio. Clivillés and Cole heard and liked Williams' baritone timbre and rhythmic flow and in 1989 they released a single called "Get Dumb! (Free Your Body)" under the moniker The Crew featuring Freedom Williams. Clivillés and Cole then recruited Williams to rap on their 1990 debut album Gonna Make You Sweat as part of Clivillés and Cole's music group C+C Music Factory. Williams' rapping can be prominently heard on many of the songs on the album, including Billboard Hot 100 No. 1 "Gonna Make You Sweat (Everybody Dance Now)", as well as other major hits "Here We Go (Let's Rock & Roll)" and "Things That Make You Go Hmmm..." (both released as singles in 1991). All three of those songs hit No. 1 on the Hot Dance Music/Club Play chart. According to C+C Music Factory founder Clivillés, he and Cole had asked him in 1994 to work on new C+C Music Factory material, but Williams refused.

Williams' solo debut, Freedom was released on June 1, 1993, on Columbia Records. The single "Voice of Freedom" peaked at No. 74 on the Billboard Hot 100 and No. 4 on the Hot Dance Music/Club Play chart in 1993, and its follow-up "Groove Your Mind" also charted on the Club Play chart, peaking at No. 33. In 2004, he enjoyed chart success again in the UK with his single "Sweat the Remixes" on RMD Entertainment. The song got national airplay and peaked at No. 8 on the UK Dance Charts that year. Williams contributed all the rap vocals for Eurodance act Masterboy's digital-only best-of-release "US Album" from 2006.

Williams was the majority owner of the Continental Basketball Association's Atlanta Krunk franchise.

In the late 1990s, Williams started to perform shows worldwide under the name C+C Music Factory, or a variation of that name. In 2005 C+C Music Factory founding member Clivillés labeled this "the biggest insult in the world". In 2005, Freedom Williams acquired the federal trademark to use the name "C and C Music Factory" for live performances, but that trademark was canceled as invalid in 2012. Williams toured under that name until renewing his trademark to "C & C Music Factory" in 2014. As of 2014, Williams has owned the trademark rights to the name for all related efforts, not just live performances.

=== Albums ===
- Freedom (1993, Columbia Records)
- Sweat (Everybody Dance Now) (2004, RMD Entertainment/Mega Bop)

=== Singles ===
List of singles, with selected chart positions
Title	Year	Peak chart positions			Album
Title	Year	AUS	NZ	UK	Album
"Voice of Freedom"	1993	41	24	62	Freedom
"Groove Your Mind"	1993	—	—	—	Freedom

=== Featured ===
- "Another Night"
- "Into the Future", a collaboration with Mark E Walker (who has a hit with Stevie B)

== See also ==
- List of number-one hits (United States)
- List of artists who reached number one on the Hot 100 (U.S.)
- List of number-one dance hits (United States)
- List of artists who reached number one on the U.S. Dance chart
