= Things That Make You Go Hmmm... =

1991 single by C+C Music Factory

Single by C+C Music Factory featuring Freedom Williams

from the album Gonna Make You Sweat
- Released: June 12, 1991
- Genre: Dance-pop; funk
- Length: 5:23
- Label: Columbia
- Songwriters: Robert Clivillés; Freedom Williams
- Producers: Robert Clivillés; David Cole

C+C Music Factory singles chronology
| "Here We Go (Let's Rock & Roll)" (1991) | "Things That Make You Go Hmmm..." (1991) | "Just a Touch of Love" (1991) |

Music video
- "Things That Make You Go Hmmmm..." on YouTube

"Things That Make You Go Hmmm..." is a song by American dance group C+C Music Factory. It was released in June 1991 by Columbia Records as the third single from their debut album, Gonna Make You Sweat (1990). The single version features Freedom Williams and Zelma Davis who also appear in the accompanying music video, directed by Marcus Nispel, while female vocals are provided by Deborah Cooper instead of Davis on the original album version. The song was inspired by a running gag on The Arsenio Hall Show, where Arsenio, while allegedly on a long drive, pondered certain thoughts and referred to them as "things that make you go hmmm...."

The C+C song was a success in the United States, reaching number four on the Billboard Hot 100 and topping the Billboard 12-inch Singles Sales and Dance Club Play charts. It also reached number four on the UK Singles Chart and number two in New Zealand. The song was certified gold by the Recording Industry Association of America (RIAA) for shipments of over 500,000 copies.

== Critical reception ==
AllMusic editor Jose F. Promis remarked that the song took a phrase popularized by Arsenio Hall and made it into "another cleverly infectious Top Ten smash." Larry Flick from Billboard magazine wrote, "After forging a guitar-driven pop/hiphop sound that is being heavily copied by others, groove clique deftly sidesteps into James Brown-style funk territory. Rapper Freedom Williams tells amusing tales amid retro-horns and percussion." Penelope Layland from The Canberra Times named it the best track on the album, "with its clever, catchy lyrics and smooth beat."

Dave Sholin from the Gavin Report stated that writers/producers Cole and Clivillés "have successfully crossbred a unique brand of rap and melody that's taken them on back-to-back trips into the Top Ten. This third entry maintains their infectious rhythm, strengthened by a title that will keep audiences hummmmin'." A reviewer from Music & Media wrote that "the secret behind the success of these dance/pop providers is the good hook in their songs. This time it's the saxophone part, which is repeated after each line." David Quantick from NME said, "The old C&Cs have blown it this time with a very ordinary sort of tune indeed that doesn't so much fail to stay in the memory as break the doors down, steal the car and drive to Birmingham."

== Chart performance ==
"Things That Make You Go Hmmm..." peaked at number one on the Billboard 12-inch Singles Sales and Dance Club Play charts in the United States and on the RPM Dance chart in Canada. On the Billboard Hot 100, it peaked at number four. In Europe, the single entered the top 10 in Finland, Ireland, and the United Kingdom. In the latter country, it peaked at number four during its fourth week on the UK Singles Chart, on July 21, 1991. Additionally, it was a top-20 hit on the UK Dance Singles Chart, as well as in the Netherlands, Sweden, and Switzerland. In Oceania, "Things That Make You Go Hmmm..." reached numbers two and six in New Zealand and Australia, respectively. The single was awarded with a gold record in the US, after 500,000 singles were shipped there.

== Music video ==
The music video for "Things That Make You Go Hmmm...." was directed by German director Marcus Nispel. It features silhouetted animation of dancers jumping and dancing in front of a white background, with a stage visible, but also in silhouette. The story of the song is also interpreted with black and gold cut-out animation.

== Impact and legacy ==
Australian music channel Max included "Things That Make You Go Hmmm..." in their list of "1000 Greatest Songs of All Time" in 2013.

== Track listings ==
- 7-inch single, Europe
1. "Things That Make You Go Hmmm...." (7-inch remix) – 4:10
2. "Things That Make You Go Hmmm...." (LP version) – 5:22
- 12-inch, US; CD maxi, Japan
1. "Things That Make You Go Hmmmm..." (The Clivillés & Cole Pumped album mix) – 5:19
2. "Things That Make You Go Hmmmm..." (The Clivillés & Cole Deep house mix) – 5:13
3. "Things That Make You Go Hmmmm..." (The Clivillés & Cole classic house mix) – 7:05
- CD single, Australia
1. "Things That Make You Go Hmmmm..." (LP version) – 5:24
2. "Gonna Make You Sweat (Everybody Dance Now)" (Clivilles & Cole D.J's Choice mix) – 5:01
3. "Here We Go" (The Cole/Clivilles house mix) – 7:45
- CD maxi, Europe
1. "Things That Make You Go Hmmm..." (C&C Classic house mix) – 7:05
2. "Things That Make You Go Hmmm..." (C&C Deep house mix) – 5:13
3. "Things That Make You Go Hmmm..." (alt. radio mix 2) – 4:49

== Charts ==
=== Weekly charts ===
| Chart (1991) | Peak position |
|---|---|
| Australia (ARIA) | 6 |
| Canada Top Singles (RPM) | 14 |
| Canada Dance/Urban (RPM) | 1 |
| Europe (Eurochart Hot 100) | 12 |
| Europe (European Hit Radio) | 13 |
| Finland (Suomen virallinen lista) | 10 |
| Germany (GfK) | 27 |
| Ireland (IRMA) | 9 |
| Israel (Israeli Singles Chart) | 7 |
| Luxembourg (Radio Luxembourg) | 3 |
| Netherlands (Dutch Top 40) | 26 |
| Netherlands (Single Top 100) | 19 |
| New Zealand (Recorded Music NZ) | 2 |
| Sweden (Sverigetopplistan) | 14 |
| Switzerland (Schweizer Hitparade) | 15 |
| UK Singles (Official Charts) | 4 |
| UK Airplay (Music Week) | 16 |
| UK Dance (Music Week) | 11 |
| UK Club Chart (Record Mirror) | 10 |
| US Billboard Hot 100 | 4 |
| US Dance Club Songs (Billboard) | 1 |
| US Dance Singles Sales (Billboard) | 1 |
| US Hot R&B/Hip-Hop Songs (Billboard) | 31 |
| US Cash Box Top 100 | 5 |

=== Year-end charts ===
| Chart (1991) | Position |
|---|---|
| Australia (ARIA) | 28 |
| Canada Dance/Urban (RPM) | 5 |
| New Zealand (RIANZ) | 12 |
| Sweden (Topplistan) | 80 |
| UK Singles (OCC) | 53 |
| US Billboard Hot 100 | 51 |
| UK Club Chart (Record Mirror) | 98 |
| US 12-inch Singles Sales (Billboard) | 13 |
| US Dance Club Play (Billboard) | 17 |
| US Cash Box Top 100 | 44 |

== Certifications ==
| Region | Certification | Certified units/sales |
|---|---|---|
| Australia (ARIA) | Gold | 35,000^{^} |
| New Zealand (RMNZ) | Gold | 5,000^{*} |
| United States (RIAA) | Gold | 500,000^{^} |
^{*} Sales figures based on certification alone.^{^} Shipments figures based on certification alone.

== Release history ==
| Region | Date | Format(s) | Label(s) | Ref. |
|---|---|---|---|---|
| United States | June 12, 1991 | 7-inch vinyl; 12-inch vinyl; CD; cassette | Columbia | |
| Australia | June 24, 1991 | CD; cassette | Columbia | |
| United Kingdom | June 24, 1991 | 7-inch vinyl; 12-inch vinyl; CD; cassette | Columbia | |
| Japan | July 11, 1991 | CD | Sony | |
| Australia | July 15, 1991 | 12-inch vinyl; CD; cassette | Columbia | |

== Covers ==
British girl group Stooshe covered the song and released it in 2013 as a B-side to their single "Black Heart", under the title "Things That Make You Go Mmm". The single reached number three in the UK and number four in Scotland.
