= Bingoboys =

American dance music trio

- Origin: Vienna, Austria
- Genres: Dance, house
- Years active: 1990–1995
- Labels: Atlantic Records (1990 - 1992); WEA (1992 - 1994)
- Members: Klaus Biedermann; Paul Pfab; Helmut Wolfgruber

Bingoboys was an Austrian dance music trio from Vienna consisting of DJs Klaus Biedermann, Paul Pfab and Helmut Wolfgruber.

They had two chart entries on the U.S. Billboard Hot Dance Club Play chart in 1991. Their debut single, "How to Dance", featuring Princessa, hit #1 on the dance chart and climbed to #25 on the Billboard Hot 100. It contained samples from "Dance, Dance, Dance (Yowsah, Yowsah, Yowsah)" by Chic, "Dance (Disco Heat)" by Sylvester, "Kiss" by Art of Noise featuring Tom Jones, the popular James Brown "Yeah! Woo!" sample loop, the bassline motif from Mantronix's single "Got to Have Your Love", a synth motif from The Whispers' "And the Beat Goes On", and spoken male dialogue from a K-tel disco instructional album released in the 1970s.

A follow-up single, a cover of The SOS Band's song "Borrowed Love," hit #32 on the dance chart and #71 on the Hot 100 later in the year. Princessa rapped on that track while featured vocals were performed by Arnold Jarvis. That same year, Bingoboys remixed three songs by Falco ("Der Kommissar", "Junge Roemer" and "Wiener Blut") for Falco's album, The Remix Hit Collection.

== Discography ==
=== Albums ===
List of albums, with selected details and chart positions
Title	Album details	Peak chart positions	
Title	Album details	AUT	AUS
The Best of Bingoboys	Released: May 1991; Format: CD; Label: Atlantic (756782240-2)	15	72
Color of Music	Released: 1994; Format: CD; Label: WEA (4509 95442-2)	31	—

=== Singles ===
Year	Single	Peak positions										Album
Year	Single	AUT	AUS	GER	NLD	NZ	SWE	SWI	UK	US	US Dance	Album
1990	"How to Dance" (featuring Princessa)	2	3	22	7	37	30	11	93	25	1	The Best of Bingoboys
1991	"Borrowed Love" (featuring Princessa)	—	104	—	—	—	—	—	—	71	32	The Best of Bingoboys
1991	"No Woman No Cry"	10	—	—	58	—	37	—	—	—	—	The Best of Bingoboys
1992	"Chartbuster"	5	—	—	—	—	—	—	—	—	—	singles only
1993	"Ten More Minutes"	11	—	—	—	—	—	78	—	—	—	singles only
1994	"Sugardaddy"	4	—	—	—	—	—	—	—	—	—	Color of Music
1995	"No Communication"	24	—	—	—	—	—	—	—	—	—	Color of Music
"—" denotes releases that did not chart or were not released.

== See also ==
- List of artists who reached number one on the US Dance chart
