= Princessa (singer) =

American singer

Princessa is a house music rapper/singer from New York City. She was the featured artist on two singles by the Austrian house music band, Bingoboys: the first was the song "How to Dance", which hit number one on the U.S. Dance chart in 1991, as well as number 25 on the Billboard Hot 100; the second was a follow-up single, "Borrowed Love", which peaked at number 32 on the dance chart the same year. She also did a guest appearance on Chic's 1992 number-one club hit "Chic Mystique". She worked with Vanilla Ice on a number of songs as a backup singer from 1987 to 1991. Additionally, Princessa appeared as a feature on the Bingoboys' hit track "The Dancer".

== Singles ==
Year	Single	Peak positions											Album
Year	Single	AUT	SWI	GER	NED	BEL (FLA)	SWE	UK	AUS	NZ	US	US Dance	Album
1991	"How to Dance" (Bingoboys featuring Princessa)	2	11	22	7	30	30	93	3	37	25	1	The Best Of Bingoboys
1991	"Borrowed Love" (Bingoboys featuring Princessa)	—	—	—	—	—	—	—	—	—	71	32	The Best Of Bingoboys
"—" denotes releases that did not chart or were not released.													The Best Of Bingoboys

== See also ==
- List of artists who reached number one on the US Dance chart
