= Gonna Make You Sweat (Everybody Dance Now) =

1990 single by C+C Music Factory

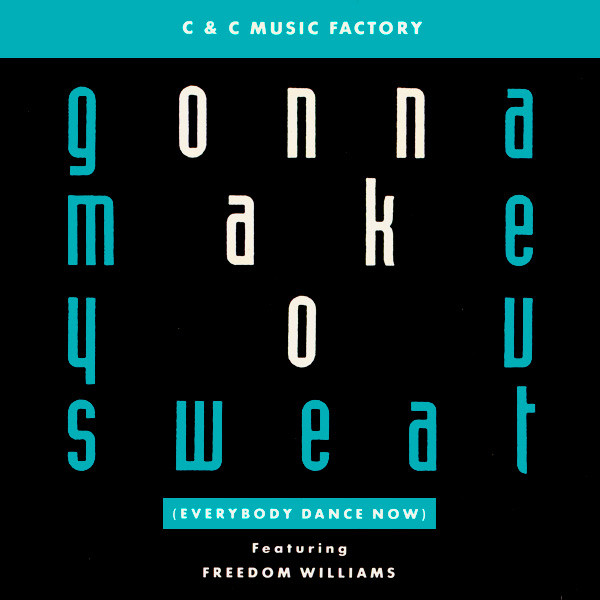
- US CD single

Single by C+C Music Factory featuring Freedom Williams

from the album Gonna Make You Sweat
- Released: October 10, 1990
- Genre: Hip house; diva house; funk; dance-pop
- Length: 4:06
- Label: Columbia
- Songwriters: Robert Clivillés; Frederick Williams; David Cole
- Producer: Clivillés and Cole

C+C Music Factory singles chronology
"Gonna Make You Sweat (Everybody Dance Now)" (1990)	"Here We Go (Let's Rock & Roll)" (1991)

Music video
- "Gonna Make You Sweat (Everybody Dance Now)" on YouTube

"Gonna Make You Sweat (Everybody Dance Now)" is a song by American dance music group C+C Music Factory, released by Columbia Records on October 10, 1990, as the lead single from their debut album, Gonna Make You Sweat (1990). The song is sung by Martha Wash and rapped by Freedom Williams; it was written by Williams, Robert Clivillés and David Cole, and produced by Clivillés and Cole.

In early 1991, the song charted internationally, topping the charts of Austria, Germany, the Netherlands, Switzerland, and the United States. The accompanying music video was directed by Marcus Nispel, and features singer/dancer Zelma Davis lip-syncing to Wash's vocal parts. In 2023 and 2025, Billboard magazine ranked "Gonna Make You Sweat (Everybody Dance Now)" among the best pop and dance songs of all time.

== Background and writing ==
Robert Clivillés wrote and produced an instrumental track that was to become "Gonna Make You Sweat". He offered the track to vocal trio Trilogy, but when they declined to record it, Clivillés decided to use the track for his and David Cole's band, C+C Music Factory. The rap verse was performed by Freedom Williams and the female vocals by Martha Wash.

The music video showed singer and dancer Zelma Davis lip-syncing to Wash's vocal parts. After discovering that the group was using Davis in the music video, Wash (who does not appear in the video) unsuccessfully attempted to negotiate with the producers of the C+C Music Factory for sleeve credits and royalties. Additionally, the song used an edited compilation of vocal parts that Wash recorded in June 1990 for an unrelated demonstration tape. On December 11, 1991, Wash filed a lawsuit in the Los Angeles Superior Court against C+C Music Factory's Robert Clivillés and David Cole, charging the producers and their record company, Sony Music Entertainment, with fraud, deceptive packaging, and commercial appropriation. The case was eventually settled in 1994, and as a result of the settlement, Sony made an unprecedented request of MTV to add a disclaimer that credited Wash for vocals and Davis for "visualization" to the "Gonna Make You Sweat" music video.

== Recording ==
Having previously worked with David Cole doing some demos in the past, Martha Wash recorded her vocals for "Gonna Make You Sweat" as a demo song. She was told that it was for another artist. Only Robert Clivillés was present in the studio during recording. Wash had to phone Cole for instructions on how to sing, before recording her vocals. She stated in 2017:

I remember thinking as I was singing the hook of the song that it was set so high, it was like I was reaching for the ceiling trying to hit the notes. "Damn, this is high", I was thinking, basically screaming at the top of my lungs. I don't know what happened to the vocalist who they had originally in mind to actually sing the song or why they didn't use her version.

== Reception ==
Music critics praised "Gonna Make You Sweat" for Freedom Williams' Ice-T-like rap delivery in conjunction with Martha Wash's powerful, exuberant, post-disco vocals and deemed the song as a bona fide classic. Bill Lamb from About.com said that the vocal performances "along with state-of-the-art house rhythms" made up "one of the most exhilarating songs of the year". AllMusic editor Jose F. Promis described it as "unstoppable" and noted that it "incorporated dance, house, and hip hop beats, wailing diva vocals, and rap to come up with one of the year's most exciting hits". Larry Flick from Billboard magazine wrote, "New act featuring hot producers Robert Clivillés and David Cole serves up a potential multiformat smash with this slammin', guitar-driven hip-hopper, fueled by a stellar appearance from former Weather Girl Martha Wash". He remarked its "wall-shattering command" 'everybody dance now' by Wash, that fast filled dancefloors and air-waves around the world. The song was also described as "a virtually flawless stew of hip-hop bass and percussion, deft rhyming courtesy of newcomer Freedom Williams, and ripping vocals by supreme diva Martha Wash".

Penelope Layland from The Canberra Times stated that the song "is highly percussive, with an urgent beat contrasting well with the lazy vocal delivery". Marisa Fox from Entertainment Weekly said it "sounds like a composite of 1990's most memorable pop/dance tunes — a screeching bass line (reminiscent of Snap!'s 'The Power' jam), wailing lead vocals sung by former Weather Girl Martha Wash, and up-tempo beats that reek of Technotronic." Dave Sholin from the Gavin Report noted that it's "difficult to package any more excitement into this release which exemplifies what fresh music is all about". A. Scott Galloway from The Network Forty named the song "an electrifying debut from Robert Clivillés & David Cole, the production team that brought you Seduction. With singer Freedom Williams up front demanding "Everybody Dance Now", the song is simply the best party starter to come along in months. It doesn't hurt that it's right in line sound-wise with past chart top hits like Black Box's 'Everybody Everybody' and Snap!'s 'The Power', either". A reviewer from People Magazine stated that the track "deserves its Top 10 status, along with hit-to-be 'Things That Make You Go Hmmm...' blending rap, rock and dance riffs".

Over the years, the song came to be used and/or referenced innumerable times by the entertainment industry, to the point that it became something of a musical, pop culture cliché. By 2007, the song was criticized by AllMusic as "the lazy Hollywood 'go-to' song for supposed laugh-filled, irony-fueled dance numbers".

== Commercial performance ==
The song held the top spot on the US Billboard Dance Club Play chart for five weeks in December 1990 and topped the Billboard Hot 100 for two weeks in February 1991. In Canada, it topped the Canadian RPM Dance and The Record's Retail Singles chart. In Europe, it peaked at number one in Austria, Germany, the Netherlands and Switzerland. The single entered the top 10 in Belgium, Denmark, Finland, Greece, Iceland, Luxembourg, Norway, Spain, Sweden and the United Kingdom, as well as on the Eurochart Hot 100, where it peaked at number two. In the UK, "Gonna Make You Sweat" peaked a number three in its sixth week at the UK Singles Chart, on January 13, 1991. Additionally, it was a top-20 hit in Ireland, a top-30 hit in Italy, and a top-50 hit in France. In Oceania, the single peaked at numbers two and three in New Zealand and Australia, respectively. It earned a platinum record in the US, after one million singles were sold there.

== Music video ==
The music video for "Gonna Make You Sweat (Everybody Dance Now)" was directed by German director Marcus Nispel and featured dancers performing in front of a white backdrop. Zelma Davis lip-syncs to the recorded vocals of Martha Wash, who doesn't appear in the video. A short clip of Double Dutch is shown near the end. The video received heavy rotation on MTV Europe in February 1991.

== Impact and legacy ==
In 2000, VH1 ranked "Gonna Make You Sweat" number nine on its list of "100 Greatest Dance Songs", and at number 36 on its list of "100 Greatest Songs of the 90s" in 2007. In October 2023 and March 2025, Billboard magazine ranked it numbers 402 and 26 in their lists of "500 Best Pop Songs of All Time" and "100 Best Dance Songs of All Time", writing, "The criminal replacement of her in the video aside, Martha Wash's command of everybody dance now! to kick off this Hot 100-topping early-'90s smash simply cannot be ignored. A flawless fusion of soulful house diva power and Freedom Williams' rumbling rhymes, "Gonna Make You Sweat", is writers/producers Robert Clivillés and David Cole (the C+C) at their best. Blending their forceful production with the perfect vocal yin/yang, the song became an international smash and an early indicator of house music's crossover potential. It continues to echo through pop culture today."

=== Accolades ===
	Publisher	Country	Accolade	Rank
2000	VH1	United States	"100 Greatest Dance Songs"	9
2005	Bruce Pollock	United States	"The 7,500 Most Important Songs of 1944-2000"	*
2007	VH1	United States	"100 Greatest Songs of the 90s"	36
2010	Robert Dimery	United States	1001 Songs You Must Hear Before You Die	*
2011	MTV Dance	United Kingdom	"The 100 Biggest 90's Dance Anthems of All Time"	35
2013	Vibe	United States	"Before EDM: 30 Dance Tracks from the '90s That Changed the Game"	26
2017	BuzzFeed	United States	"The 101 Greatest Dance Songs of the '90s"	12
2018	ThoughtCo	United States	"The Best 100 Songs from the 1990s"	74
2019	Billboard	United States	"Billboard's Top Songs of the '90s"	30
2019	Max	Australia	"1000 Greatest Songs of All Time"	765
2019	ThoughtCo	United States	"25 Best Dance Pop Songs of All Time"	14
2020	Cleveland.com	United States	"Best Billboard Hot 100 No. 1 song of the 1990s"	32
2022	Time Out	United Kingdom	"The 50 Best Gay Songs to Celebrate Pride All Year Long"	26
2022	Time Out	United Kingdom	"The 100 Best Party Songs Ever Made"	4
2023	Billboard	United States	"Best Pop Songs of All Time"	402
2024	Billboard	United States	"The 100 Greatest Jock Jams of All Time"	25
2024	Cosmopolitan	United States	"60 of the Best '90s Songs for the Ultimate Throwback Playlist"	53
2025	Billboard	United States	"The 100 Best Dance Songs of All Time"	26

== Track listings ==
- 7-inch single
1. "Gonna Make You Sweat (Everybody Dance Now)" (radio version) – 4:06
2. "Gonna Make You Sweat (Everybody Dance Now)" (In Your Face mix instrumental) – 4:54
- 12-inch maxi
1. "Gonna Make You Sweat (Everybody Dance Now)" (The Slammin' vocal club mix) – 6:50
2. "Gonna Make You Sweat (Everybody Dance Now)" (Clivillés & Cole DJ's Choice mix) – 5:00
3. "Gonna Make You Sweat (Everybody Dance Now)" (The Master mix instrumental) – 4:54
- CD single
1. "Gonna Make You Sweat (Everybody Dance Now)" (radio version) – 4:06
2. "Gonna Make You Sweat (Everybody Dance Now)" (In Your Face mix instrumental) – 4:54

== Charts ==
=== Weekly charts ===
Chart (1990–1991)	Peak position
Australia (ARIA)	3
Austria (Ö3 Austria Top 40)	1
Belgium (Ultratop 50 Flanders)	5
Belgium (VRT Top 30 Flanders)	3
Canada Retail Singles (The Record)	1
Canada Top Singles (RPM)	6
Canada Dance/Urban (RPM)	1
Denmark (IFPI)	8
Europe (Eurochart Hot 100)	2
Europe (European Hit Radio)	12
Finland (Suomen virallinen lista)	8
France (SNEP)	43
Germany (GfK)	1
Greece (IFPI)	2
Iceland (Íslenski listinn)	6
Ireland (IRMA)	13
Israel (Israeli Singles Chart)	5
Italy (Musica e dischi)	22
Luxembourg (Radio Luxembourg)	2
Netherlands (Dutch Top 40)	2
Netherlands (Single Top 100)	1
New Zealand (Recorded Music NZ)	2
Norway (VG-lista)	5
Spain (AFYVE)	2
Sweden (Sverigetopplistan)	5
Switzerland (Schweizer Hitparade)	1
UK Singles (Official Charts)	3
UK Airplay (Music Week)	18
UK Dance (Music Week)	1
UK Club Chart (Record Mirror)	1
US Billboard Hot 100	1
US 12-inch Singles Sales (Billboard)	1
US Dance Club Play (Billboard)	1
US Hot R&B Singles (Billboard)	1
US Cash Box Top 100	1

Chart (2023)	Peak position
Hungary (Single Top 40)	34

=== Year-end charts ===
Chart (1990)	Position
UK Club Chart (Record Mirror)	42

Chart (1991)	Position
Australia (ARIA)	26
Austria (Ö3 Austria Top 40)	30
Belgium (Ultratop)	55
Canada Top Singles (RPM)	59
Canada Dance/Urban (RPM)	2
Europe (Eurochart Hot 100)	12
Europe (European Hit Radio)	87
Germany (Media Control)	11
Netherlands (Dutch Top 40)	17
Netherlands (Single Top 100)	10
New Zealand (RIANZ)	8
Sweden (Topplistan)	26
Switzerland (Schweizer Hitparade)	13
UK Singles (OCC)	72
UK Club Chart (Record Mirror)	23
US Billboard Hot 100	3
US 12-inch Singles Sales (Billboard)	1
US Dance Club Play (Billboard)	1
US Hot R&B Singles (Billboard)	3
US Cash Box Top 100	20

=== Decade-end charts ===
Chart (1990–1999)	Position
Canada (Nielsen SoundScan)	35

=== All-time charts ===
Chart (2018)	Position
US Billboard Hot 100	187

== Certifications ==
Region	Certification	Certified units/sales
Australia (ARIA)	Gold	35,000^{^}
New Zealand (RMNZ)	Platinum	30,000^{‡}
United Kingdom (BPI)	Gold	400,000^{‡}
United States (RIAA)	2× Platinum	2,000,000^{‡}
^{^} Shipments figures based on certification alone.^{‡} Sales+streaming figures based on certification alone.

== Release history ==
Region	Date	Format(s)	Label(s)	Ref.
United States	October 10, 1990	Commercial	Columbia	
United Kingdom	December 3, 1990	7-inch vinyl; CD; cassette	CBS	
Australia	December 17, 1990	12-inch vinyl; CD; cassette	CBS	
United Kingdom	January 21, 1991	12-inch remix vinyl	CBS	
Australia	January 28, 1991	Cassette	CBS	
Japan	October 25, 1991	Mini-CD (with "Just a Touch of Love")	Sony	

== Cover versions ==
- "Gonna Make You Sweat (Everybody Dance Now)" was reworked by French DJ Bob Sinclar in his 2006 song "Rock This Party (Everybody Dance Now)", which became a hit in many countries including the UK, Finland and France where it reached number 3 and in Belgium where it topped both the Ultratop 50 Flanders and Wallonia charts.
- Russian group Little Big covered the track for the soundtrack of the film Borat Subsequent Moviefilm, and it can be heard in some of the trailers, and is featured in full during the closing credits. In Da Ali G Show, this was Borat's favorite song.

== In popular culture ==
Ubisoft has used two covers of the song in their Just Dance games:

- A cover by Sweat Invaders is used in both Just Dance 3 (2011) and the Japan-exclusive Just Dance Wii 2 (2012).
- Another cover by Boston Soundlabs is used in Just Dance Kids (Note: Dance Juniors in PAL regions) (2010).

The song has been used in many films and television shows; for example:

- In The Simpsons Season 8 episode "Homer's Phobia", the song is used in the gay steel mill-cum-nightclub Ajax Steel Mill/The Anvil, as well as during the end credits after Bart wonders if he's gay. It is also used in the Season 22 episode "Love Is a Many Strangled Thing", where it plays during a football game.
- King Julien (voiced by Sacha Baron Cohen) sings a brief cover of the song in an early scene of Madagascar 3 (2012).
- The end credits of the 2007 film Evan Almighty.

The song has also been used in numerous film trailers and television commercials.

In the 1993 film Fear of a Black Hat, the song is parodied as "Come and Pet the P.U.S.S.Y." as a solo track by the character Ice Cold (Rusty Cundieff)'s post-N.W.H. group, The Ice Plant (a parody of C+C Music Factory). The main joke is that a petite Japanese woman lip-syncs the powerful voice of a heavy-set African-American woman without the latter getting credit for it in the music video, also in reference to the conflict Martha Wash had with C+CMF.

Ice dancers Tessa Virtue and Scott Moir performed to the song in the Figure Skating Exhibition Gala at the 2010 Winter Olympics after winning the gold medal.

In September 2017, the song was featured as one of the soundtracks of 2K's video game series, NBA 2K18.

In 2024, a parody of the song, "Everybody DampRid" was used in a commercial for the moisture absorber DampRid. Also in 2024, Coles Supermarkets used another parody, "Great Value, Hands Down", in their television commercials and YouTube ads.

== See also ==
- List of number-one hits of 1991 (Austria)
- List of number-one hits of 1991 (Germany)
- List of Billboard Hot 100 number-one singles of 1991
- List of number-one dance singles of 1990 (U.S.)
- List of number-one R&B singles of 1991 (U.S.)
