= List of awards and nominations received by Donna Summer =

Donna Summer awards and nominations
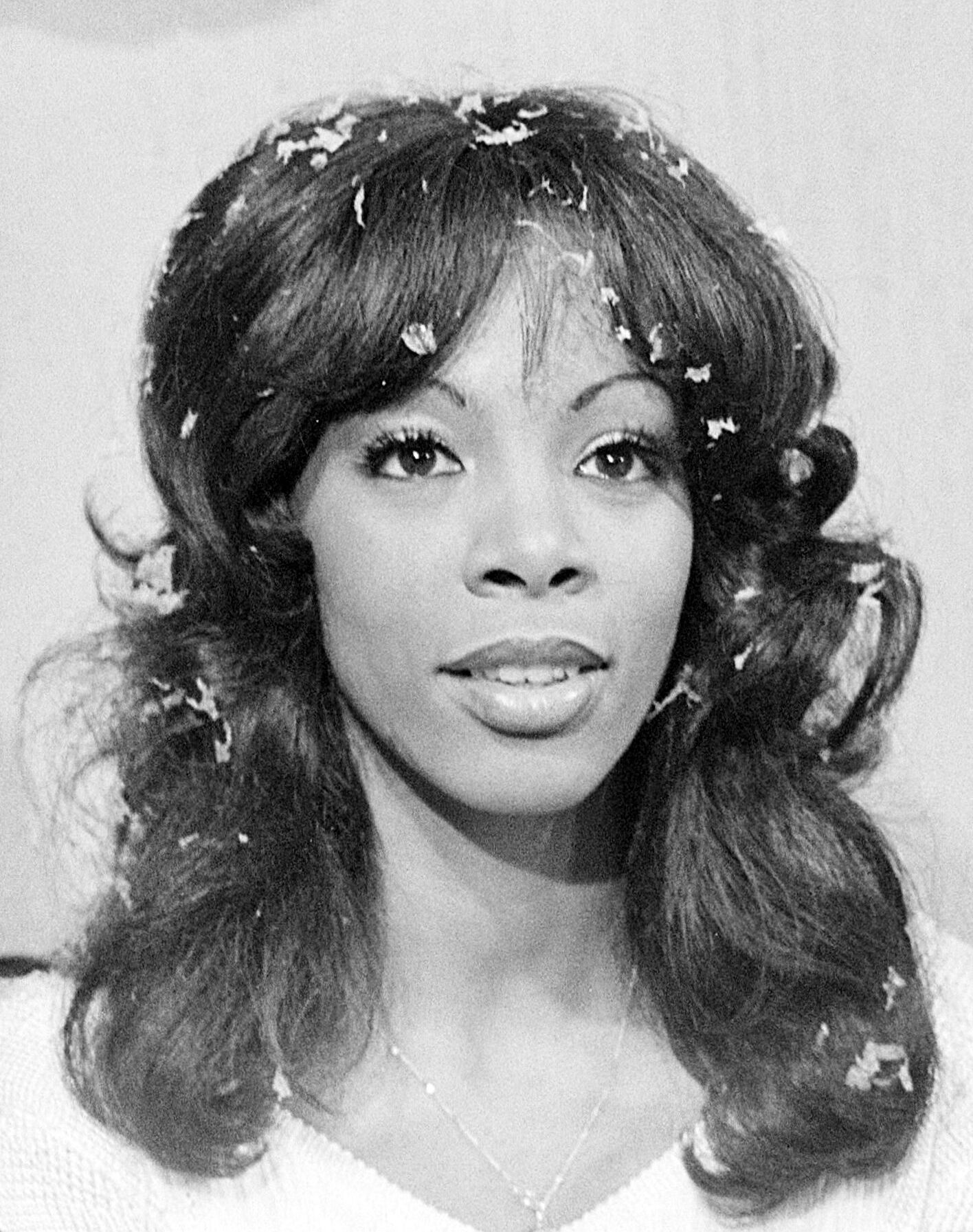
- Summer in December 1974
Awards and nominations
Award	Wins	Nominations
Grammy Awards	5	18
American Music Awards	6	12

Donna Summer (1948–2012) was an American singer and songwriter. She achieved her breakthrough with the 1975 single, "Love to Love You Baby", which helped her sign with Casablanca Records and propelled her into a sex symbol. Her 1977 single, "I Feel Love", was nominated for the Best Selling International Single at the Juno Award. The following year, she made her film debut in Thank God It's Friday and contributed to its soundtrack. "Last Dance", an original song from the film, earned Summer the American Music Award for Favorite Disco Single and the Grammy Award for Best Female R&B Vocal Performance. (Note: For "Last Dance", songwriter Paul Jabara won the Grammy Award for Best R&B Song, along with the Academy Award and Golden Globe Award for Best Original Song. However, these accolades recognized only the songwriter, meaning Summer did not receive credit for them.)

In 1978, Summer achieved her first number-one album and single on the US Billboard charts, with Live and More and "MacArthur Park", respectively. Bad Girls (1979) became her critical and commercial peak, (Note: By 2012, Bad Girls was Summer's best-selling album, selling 4 million copies worldwide.) earning five Grammy nominations, including Album of the Year. "Dim All the Lights" was nominated for Best Female R&B Vocal Performance, and set a Guinness World Record for the longest-held vocal note in a US hit single. Summer won the inaugural Grammy Award for Best Female Rock Vocal Performance for "Hot Stuff", making her the first black artist to win a Grammy in a rock category. She was Billboard's Top Female Artist and Top Singles Artist of 1979, achieving three number-one singles in a single calendar year and three consecutive number-one double albums, an unprecedented feat for a female singer.

The singer signed with Geffen Records in 1980, and earned four Grammy nominations for The Wanderer (1980) and Donna Summer (1982), including two consecutive Best Female Rock Vocal Performance nominations for "Cold Love" and "Protection". Summer received numerous nominations for her hit single, "She Works Hard for the Money" (1983), with the song nominated for Best Female Pop Vocal Performance and the video nominated for Best Female Video at the inaugural MTV Video Music Awards in 1984.

After a period of seclusion and moderate follow-ups, Summer made a comeback with the album, Another Place and Time (1989), which featured the hit single, "This Time I Know It's for Real", which won Summer an Ivor Novello Award. In March 1992, at the age of 43, Summer received a star on the Hollywood Walk of Fame. In 1998, Summer made Grammy history again when she became the first recipient of Best Dance Recording with the song "Carry On", following a 1997 remix release, being Summer's fifth and last competitive Grammy. By the turn of the new millennium, Summer was starting to get recognition for her career. In 2004, she was inducted into the Dance Music Hall of Fame. After four previous nominations, Summer was inducted into the Rock and Roll Hall of Fame in 2013.

== Awards and nominations ==
Key
†	Indicates non-competitive categories

Award (Note: Listicles and charts are not included, unless they are explicitly described as "awards" or specific trophies are given.)	Year (Note: Indicates the year of ceremony. Each year is linked to the article about the awards held that year, wherever possible.)	Category	Recipient(s) and nominee(s)	Result	Ref(s).
American Music Awards	1978	Favorite Soul/R&B Female Artist	Donna Summer	Nominated	
American Music Awards	1979 (Note: Summer led all nominees with five nominations. She co-hosted the show with Glen Campbell and Helen Reddy.)	Favorite Pop/Rock Female Artist	Donna Summer	Nominated	
American Music Awards	1979	Favorite Soul/R&B Female Artist	Donna Summer	Nominated	
American Music Awards	1979	Favorite Disco Female Artist	Donna Summer	Won	
American Music Awards	1979	Favorite Disco Album	Live and More	Won	
American Music Awards	1979	Favorite Disco Single	"Last Dance"	Won	
American Music Awards	1980 (Note: Summer and Kenny Rogers led all nominees with four nominations.)	Favorite Pop/Rock Album	Bad Girls	Nominated	
American Music Awards	1980	Favorite Pop/Rock Single	"Bad Girls"	Won	
American Music Awards	1980	Favorite Pop/Rock Female Artist	Donna Summer	Won	
American Music Awards	1980	Favorite Soul/R&B Female Artist	Donna Summer	Won	
American Music Awards	1984	Favorite Soul/R&B Female Artist	Donna Summer	Nominated	
American Music Awards	1984	Favorite Pop/Rock Female Artist	Donna Summer	Nominated	
American Music Awards	1984	Favorite Soul/R&B Video	"She Works Hard for the Money"	Nominated	
ASCAP Pop Music Awards	1990	Most Performed Song	"This Time I Know It's for Real"	Won	
Dance Music Hall of Fame	2004	Recording Artist	Donna Summer	Inducted	
Dance Music Hall of Fame	2004	Influential Single	"I Feel Love"	Inducted	
Grammy Awards	1979	Best Pop Vocal Performance, Female	"MacArthur Park"	Nominated	
Grammy Awards	1979	Best R&B Vocal Performance, Female	"Last Dance"	Won	
Grammy Awards	1980	Album of the Year	Bad Girls	Nominated	
Grammy Awards	1980	Best Pop Vocal Performance, Female	Bad Girls	Nominated	
Grammy Awards	1980	Best Disco Recording	"Bad Girls"	Nominated	
Grammy Awards	1980	Best R&B Vocal Performance, Female	"Dim All the Lights"	Nominated	
Grammy Awards	1980	Best Rock Vocal Performance, Female	"Hot Stuff"	Won	
Grammy Awards	1981	Best Pop Vocal Performance, Female	"On the Radio"	Nominated	
Grammy Awards	1982	Best Rock Vocal Performance, Female	"Cold Love"	Nominated	
Grammy Awards	1982	Best Inspirational Performance	"I Believe in Jesus"	Nominated	
Grammy Awards	1983	Best R&B Vocal Performance, Female	"Love Is in Control (Finger on the Trigger)"	Nominated	
Grammy Awards	1983	Best Rock Vocal Performance, Female	"Protection"	Nominated	
Grammy Awards	1984	Album of the Year	Flashdance: Original Soundtrack from the Motion Picture	Nominated	
Grammy Awards	1984	Best Pop Vocal Performance, Female	"She Works Hard for the Money"	Nominated	
Grammy Awards	1984	Best Inspirational Performance	"He's a Rebel"	Won	
Grammy Awards	1985	Best Inspirational Performance	"Forgive Me"	Won	
Grammy Awards	1998	Best Dance Recording	"Carry On" (with Giorgio Moroder)	Won	
Grammy Awards	2000	Best Dance Recording	"I Will Go with You (Con te partiró)"	Nominated	
Grammy Awards	2024	Grammy Lifetime Achievement Award	Donna Summer	Honoree	
Grammy Awards	2024	Grammy Hall of Fame Award	"I Feel Love"	Inducted	
Hollywood Walk of Fame	1992	Recording	Donna Summer	Inducted	
Ivor Novello Awards	1990	Most Performed Work	"This Time I Know It's for Real"	Won	
Juno Awards	1977	Best Selling International Single	"I Feel Love"	Nominated	
MTV Video Music Awards	1984	Best Female Video	"She Works Hard for the Money"	Nominated	
MTV Video Music Awards	1984	Best Choreography in a Video (Note: This award was for the choreographer, in this case, Arlene Phillips.)	"She Works Hard for the Money"	Nominated	
National Recording Registry	2011	–	"I Feel Love"	Inducted	
NAACP Image Awards	1980	Outstanding Recording Artist	Donna Summer	Won	
National Rhythm & Blues Hall of Fame	2021	National Rhythm & Blues Hall of Fame	Donna Summer	Inducted	
Rock & Roll Hall of Fame	2012	Performer	Donna Summer	Inducted	
Songs of the Century	2001	Songs of the Century	"She Works Hard for the Money"	Inducted	
Songwriters Hall of Fame	2025	Songwriter	Herself	Inducted	
