= The Summer Collection: Greatest Hits =

Greatest hits album by Donna Summer
- Released: December 2, 1985
- Genre: Disco; pop; dance; rock; soul; R&B
- Length: 40:20
- Label: Mercury
- Producer: Giorgio Moroder, Pete Bellotte, Michael Omartian

Donna Summer chronology
Cats Without Claws (1984)	The Summer Collection: Greatest Hits (1985)	The Dance Collection: A Compilation of Twelve Inch Singles (1987)

Professional ratings
Review scores
Source	Rating
AllMusic	3/5 stars

The Summer Collection is a compilation album by Donna Summer released in 1985 by Mercury Records. Summer had made her name during the era of disco music in the 1970s when she was signed to Casablanca Records. In 1980, she signed to Geffen Records but her success there was not what it had been on Casablanca. In the early 1980s, Casablanca was bought out entirely by Polygram Records, and Summer had returned to them for one studio album. Mercury, another division of Polygram and a sister company to Casablanca, released that album entitled She Works Hard for the Money in 1983. It also released this compilation album in 1985, containing seven of her original disco hits from Casablanca, plus three songs from the aforementioned Mercury Records album.

== Track listing ==
Side A
No.	Title	Writer(s)	Album	Length
1.	"She Works Hard for the Money"	Donna Summer/Michael Omartian	She Works Hard for the Money (1983)	4:33
2.	"Bad Girls"	Donna Summer/Bruce Sudano/Eddie Hokenson/Joe Esposito	Bad Girls (1979)	4:00
3.	"On the Radio"	Giorgio Moroder/Donna Summer	On the Radio: Greatest Hits Volumes I & II (1979)	4:06
4.	"Stop, Look and Listen"	Donna Summer/Michael Omartian/Greg Phillinganes	She Works Hard for the Money (1983)	4:08
5.	"Last Dance"	Paul Jabara	Thank God It's Friday (1978)	3:19

Side B
No.	Title	Writer(s)	Album	Length
6.	"MacArthur Park"	Jimmy Webb	Live and More (1978)	3:56
7.	"Heaven Knows" (duet with Brooklyn Dreams)	Donna Summer/Giorgio Moroder/Pete Bellotte	Live and More (1978)	3:36
8.	"Unconditional Love"	Donna Summer/Michael Omartian	She Works Hard for the Money (1983)	4:43
9.	"I Love You"	Donna Summer/Giorgio Moroder/Pete Bellotte	Once Upon a Time (1977)	3:19
10.	"No More Tears (Enough Is Enough)" (duet with Barbra Streisand)	Paul Jabara/Bruce Roberts	On the Radio: Greatest Hits Volumes I & II (1979)	4:48
