= Walk Away: Collector's Edition (The Best of 1977–1980) =

Compilation album by Donna Summer
- Released: September 8, 1980
- Recorded: 1977–1979
- Genre: Disco
- Length: 37:15
- Label: Casablanca
- Producer: Giorgio Moroder; Pete Bellotte

Donna Summer chronology
On the Radio: Greatest Hits Volumes I & II (1979)	Walk Away: Collector's Edition (The Best of 1977–1980) (1980)	The Wanderer (1980)

Professional ratings
Review scores
Source	Rating
AllMusic	4.5/5 stars
Encyclopedia of Popular Music	3/5 stars

Walk Away: Collector's Edition (The Best of 1977–1980) is a compilation album by American singer Donna Summer, released on September 8, 1980, by Casablanca Records.

== Overview ==
In 1980, Donna Summer left Casablanca Records after a big conflict and filed a lawsuit against them, which was later settled. At the same time, Summer signed a contract with Geffen Records and began working on a new album, in a completely different way from the suddenly unpopular disco.

In an effort to get as much benefit as possible after breaking up with such a popular artist as "Queen of Disco" Donna Summer and in an attempt to sabotage her new releases, the label released several more singles from the 1979 multi-platinum album Bad Girls. The label also prepared for release a new compilation, which was called Walk Away, based on the song of the same name. It was released on September 8, 1980, just a few days before the release of Summer's new single "The Wanderer" from the new album. The compilation included nine tracks, almost all of which were in the top five of the Billboard Hot 100 and were awarded various awards.

Although the record itself, as well as the previously released three singles, did not show brilliant results in the charts, reaching only 50th place in the Billboard 200 and 54th in the Top Black Albums.

== Track listing ==
Side A
No.	Title	Writer(s)	Length
1.	"Bad Girls"	Donna Summer; Bruce Sudano; Joe Esposito; Edward Hokenson	3:55
2.	"Hot Stuff"	Pete Bellotte; Harold Faltermeyer; Keith Forsey	3:47
3.	"On the Radio"	Summer; Giorgio Moroder	3:59
4.	"I Feel Love"	Summer; Moroder; Bellotte	5:50

Side B
No.	Title	Writer(s)	Length
1.	"Walk Away"	Bellotte; Harold Faltermeyer	3:44
2.	"Last Dance"	Paul Jabara	3:17
3.	"Sunset People"	Bellotte; Faltermeyer; Forsey	3:55
4.	"MacArthur Park"	Jimmy Webb	3:53
5.	"Our Love"	Summer; Moroder	4:54

== Charts ==
Weekly chart performance for Walk Away: Collector's Edition (The Best of 1977–1980)
Chart (1980)	Peak position
US Billboard 200	50
US Top R&B/Hip-Hop Albums (Billboard)	54
