= The Dance Collection: A Compilation of Twelve Inch Singles =

Compilation album by Donna Summer
- Released: July 13, 1987
- Genre: Disco; pop; soul; R&B; rock
- Length: 79:36; 73:09 (CD); 79:33 (Digital)
- Label: Casablanca
- Producer: Giorgio Moroder, Pete Bellotte, Gary Klein

Donna Summer chronology
The Summer Collection: Greatest Hits (1985)	The Dance Collection: A Compilation of Twelve Inch Singles (1987)	All Systems Go (1987)

Professional ratings
Review scores
Source	Rating
AllMusic	3/5 stars
MusicHound R&B	3.5/5 stars
The Rolling Stone Album Guide	3.5/5 stars

The Dance Collection: A Compilation of Twelve Inch Singles is a compilation album by Donna Summer released in 1987 (see 1987 in music). Summer had become the biggest star of the disco era in the 1970s when signed to Casablanca Records. By 1987, Summer was signed to the Geffen label, and Casablanca had long since been bought out by Polygram. This album was released on Polygram's Casablanca label. It features some of her most famous songs from the disco era in their extended 12" versions, as they would often have been played in the clubs during their popularity.

The song "Bad Girls" was not included on the CD release. In 2003, the tracks from this compilation were remastered to form the 12" Singles & More bonus disc of the Bad Girls Deluxe Edition. On this new CD, "Bad Girls" appeared as it did on the original LP of The Dance Collection. However, "With Your Love" was replaced with the long version of "On The Radio". The release featured the 12" single mix of the "MacArthur Park Suite", rather than the original Live and More album version which appears on The Dance Collection. The digital (streaming and downloading) edition of The Dance Collection restores the original LP track listing.

== Track listing ==
=== Vinyl ===
Side A

1. "I Feel Love" (12" Mix) (Bellotte, Moroder, Summer) - 8:14
2. "With Your Love" (Promo 12" Mix) (Bellotte, Moroder, Summer) - 7:32
3. "Last Dance" (Promo 12" Mix) (Jabara) - 8:11

Side B

1. "MacArthur Park Suite" (Live and More Album Version) (Bellotte, Mathieson, Moroder, Summer, Webb) - 17:47
  - "MacArthur Park" / "One of A Kind" / "Heaven Knows" / "MacArthur Park" (Reprise)

Side C

1. "Hot Stuff" (12" Mix) (Bellotte, Faltermeyer, Forsey) - 6:46
2. "Bad Girls" (Summer, Esposito, Hokenson, Sudano) – 4:55
3. "Walk Away" (Promo 12" Mix) (Bellotte, Faltermeyer) - 7:15

Side D

1. "Dim All the Lights" (Promo 12" Mix) (Summer) - 7:10
2. "No More Tears (Enough Is Enough)" (On the Radio Album Version) (with Barbra Streisand) - 11:46

=== CD ===
1. "I Feel Love" (12" Mix) (Bellotte, Moroder, Summer) - 8:14
2. "With Your Love" (Promo 12" Mix) (Bellotte, Moroder, Summer) - 6:06 (early fade-out - official 12" promo lasts 7:32).
3. "Last Dance" (Promo 12" Mix) (Jabara) - 8:11
4. "MacArthur Park Suite" (Live and More Album Version) (Bellotte, Mathieson, Moroder, Summer, Webb) - 17:47
5. "Hot Stuff" (12" Mix) (Bellotte, Faltermeyer, Forsey) - 6:40 (early fade-out)
6. "Walk Away" (Promo 12" Mix) (Bellotte, Faltermeyer) - 7:15
7. "Dim All the Lights" (Promo 12" Mix) (Summer) - 7:10
8. "No More Tears (Enough Is Enough)" (On the Radio Album Version) (with Barbra Streisand) - 11:46

=== Digital ===
1. "I Feel Love" (12" Mix) (Bellotte, Moroder, Summer) - 8:14
2. "With Your Love" (Promo 12" Mix) (Bellotte, Moroder, Summer) - 7:34
3. "Last Dance" (Promo 12" Mix) (Jabara) - 8:13
4. "MacArthur Park Suite" (12" Version) (Bellotte, Mathieson, Moroder, Summer, Webb) - 17:35
5. "Hot Stuff" (12" Mix) (Bellotte, Faltermeyer, Forsey) - 6:46
6. "Bad Girls" (Summer, Esposito, Hokenson, Sudano) – 4:57
7. "Walk Away" (Promo 12" Mix) (Bellotte, Faltermeyer) - 7:16
8. "Dim All the Lights" (Promo 12" Mix) (Summer) - 7:14
9. "No More Tears (Enough Is Enough)" (On the Radio Album Version) (with Barbra Streisand) - 11:44

== Certifications and sales ==
Certifications for The Dance Collection: A Compilation of Twelve Inch Singles
Region	Certification	Certified units/sales
United Kingdom (BPI)	Silver	60,000^{^}
^{^} Shipments figures based on certification alone.
