= List of awards and nominations received by Giorgio Moroder =

Giorgio Moroder awards and nominations
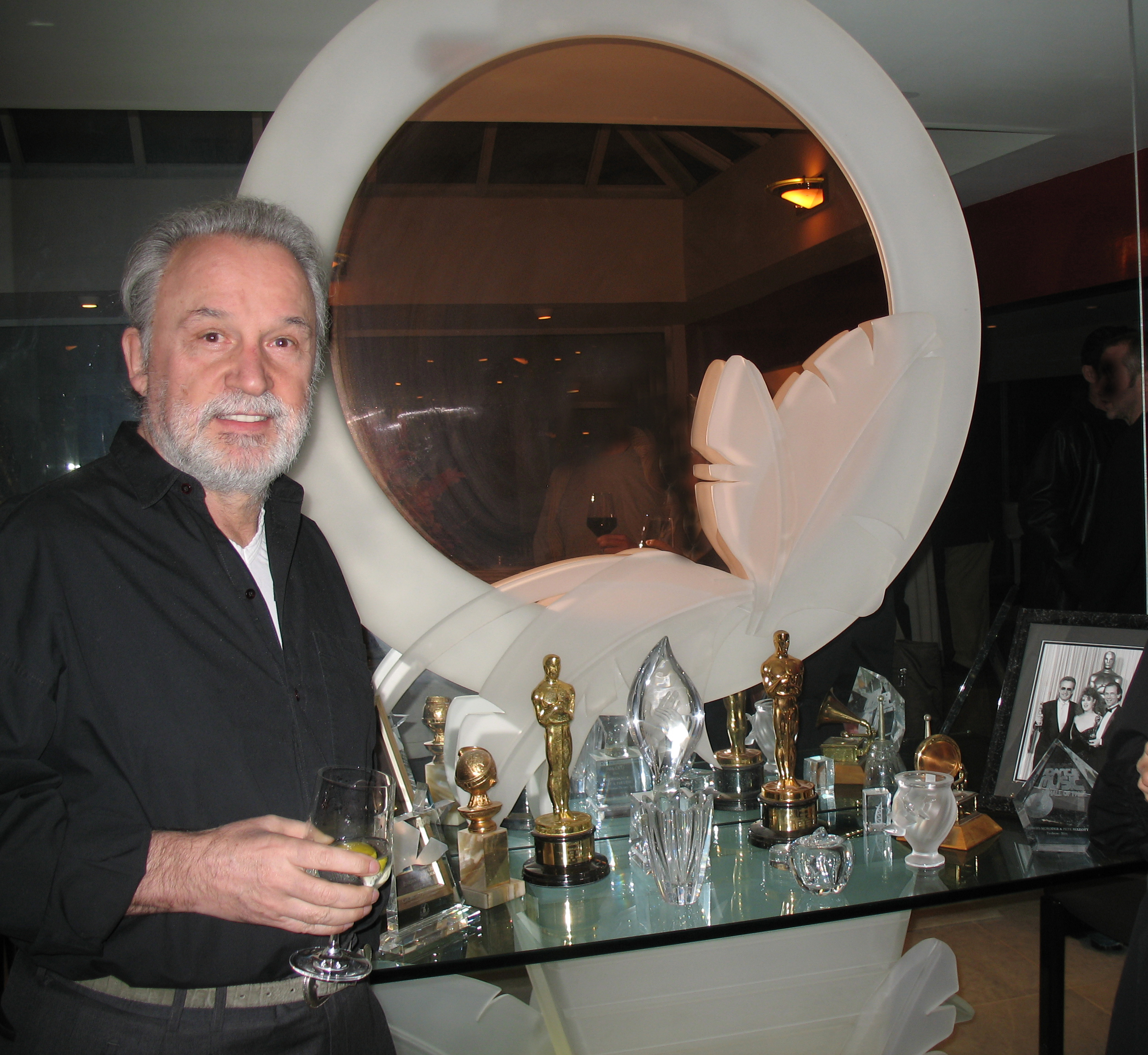
- Moroder in 2007
Awards and nominations
Award	Wins	Nominations
Golden Globe	4	9
Grammy	4	9
Academy Awards	3	3
BAFTA Awards	0	3
Los Angeles Film Critics Association	1	1
Saturn Awards	1	2
ASCAP Film and Television Music Awards	2	2
Bambi Awards	1	1
David di Donatello Awards	1	2
Golden Raspberry Awards	0	3
Palm Springs International Festival of Short Films	2	2
Venice Film Festival	1	1
World Soundtrack Awards	1	1

Totals (Note: Certain award groups do not simply award one winner. They acknowledge several different recipients, have runners-up, and have third place. Since this is a specific recognition and is different from losing an award, runner-up mentions are considered wins in this award tally. For simplification and to avoid errors, each award in this list has been presumed to have had a prior nomination.)
- Wins: 21
- Nominations: 39

Italian singer, songwriter, DJ and record producer Giorgio Moroder is one of the originators of Italo disco and electronic dance music, and his work with synthesizers heavily influenced several music genres such as house, techno and trance music. He has also been dubbed the "Father of Disco".

In the course of his career, Moroder has won three Academy Awards: Best Original Score for Midnight Express (1978), and two Best Original Song awards for "Flashdance...What a Feeling", from the film Flashdance (1983), and for "Take My Breath Away", from Top Gun (1986). Moroder also won two of his four Grammy Awards for Flashdance: Best Album or Original Score Written for a Motion Picture or a Television Special, and Best Instrumental Composition for the track "Love Theme from Flashdance". His other two awards were for Donna Summer's single "Carry On" and for Daft Punk's album Random Access Memories, which won Album of the Year. He has been nominated for nine Golden Globe Awards that resulted in four wins: Best Original Score for Midnight Express and Flashdance, and Best Original Song for "Flashdance... What a Feeling" and "Take My Breath Away".

On 20 September 2004 Moroder was honored at the Dance Music Hall of Fame ceremony, held in New York, when he was inducted for his achievements and contributions as a producer. In 2005, Moroder was named a Commendatore Ordine al Merito della Repubblica Italiana, and in 2010, the Italian city of Bolzano awarded him the Grande Ordine al Merito della Provincia autonoma di Bolzano. In 2011, he received the Lifetime Achievement Award by the World Soundtrack Academy.

== Awards and nominations ==
Awards and nominations received by Giorgio Moroder
Award	Year (Note: Indicates the year of ceremony.)	Category	Recipient(s) and nominee(s)	Result	Ref.
Academy Awards	1979	Best Original Score	Midnight Express	Won	
Academy Awards	1984	Best Original Song	"Flashdance... What a Feeling" (from Flashdance)	Won	
Academy Awards	1987	Best Original Song	"Take My Breath Away" (from Top Gun)	Won	
ASCAP Film and Television Music Awards	1987	Most Performed Songs from Motion Pictures	"Take My Breath Away" (from Top Gun)	Won	
ASCAP Film and Television Music Awards	1988	Most Performed Songs from Motion Pictures	"Meet Me Half Way" (from Over the Top)	Won	
Bambi Awards	1984	Composer of the Year	Giorgio Moroder	Won	
British Academy Film Awards	1984	Best Score for a Film	Flashdance	Nominated	
British Academy Film Awards	1984	Best Original Song	"Flashdance... What a Feeling" (from Flashdance)	Nominated	
British Academy Film Awards	1985	Best Original Song	"Together in Electric Dreams" (from Electric Dreams)	Nominated	
David di Donatello Awards	1989	Best Original Song	Fair Game	Nominated	
David di Donatello Awards	2024	Honorary David di Donatello	Giorgio Moroder	Won	
Golden Globe Awards	1979	Best Original Score	Midnight Express	Won	
Golden Globe Awards	1981	Best Original Score	American Gigolo	Nominated	
Golden Globe Awards	1981	Best Original Song	"Call Me" (from American Gigolo)	Nominated	
Golden Globe Awards	1983	Best Original Score	Cat People	Nominated	
Golden Globe Awards	1983	Best Original Song	"Cat People (Putting Out Fire)" (from Cat People)	Nominated	
Golden Globe Awards	1984	Best Original Score	Scarface	Nominated	
Golden Globe Awards	1984	Best Original Score	Flashdance	Won	
Golden Globe Awards	1984	Best Original Song	"Flashdance... What a Feeling" (from Flashdance)	Won	
Golden Globe Awards	1987	Best Original Song	"Take My Breath Away" (from Top Gun)	Won	
Golden Raspberry Awards	1984	Worst Musical Score	Superman III	Nominated	
Golden Raspberry Awards	1985	Worst Musical Score	Metropolis (1984 version), Thief of Hearts	Nominated	
Golden Raspberry Awards	1985	Worst Original Song	"Love Kills" (from Metropolis)	Nominated	
Grammy Awards	1979	Best Score Soundtrack for Visual Media	Midnight Express	Nominated	
Grammy Awards	1980	Album of the Year	Bad Girls	Nominated	
Grammy Awards	1980	Best Disco Recording	"Dim All the Lights"	Nominated	
Grammy Awards	1984	Album of the Year	Flashdance	Nominated	
Grammy Awards	1984	Best Score Soundtrack for Visual Media	Flashdance	Won	
Grammy Awards	1984	Record of the Year	"Flashdance... What a Feeling"	Nominated	
Grammy Awards	1984	Best Instrumental Composition	"Love Theme from Flashdance"	Won	
Grammy Awards	1998	Best Dance Recording	"Carry On"	Won	
Grammy Awards	2014	Album of the Year	Random Access Memories (as a featured artist)	Won	
Los Angeles Film Critics Association Awards	1978	Best Music Score	Midnight Express	Won	
Palm Springs International Festival of Short Films	1996	Best Experimental — Audience Award	Giorgio Moroder	Won	
Palm Springs International Festival of Short Films	1996	Best Experimental — Jury Award	Giorgio Moroder	Won	
Saturn Awards	1985	Best Music	The NeverEnding Story	Nominated	
Saturn Awards	2012	Best DVD or Blu-ray Special Edition Release	Giorgio Moroder Presents Metropolis	Won	
Venice Film Festival	2020	Soundtrack Stars Award – Lifetime Achievement	Giorgio Moroder	Won	
World Soundtrack Awards	2011	Lifetime Achievement	Giorgio Moroder	Won	

== Honors ==
=== State and local honors ===
State and local honors received by Giorgio Moroder
Country or city	Year	Honor	Ref.
Italy	2005	Commendatore Ordine al Merito della Repubblica Italiana	
Bolzano	2010	Grande Ordine al Merito della Provincia Autonoma di Bolzano	

=== Other accolades ===
Other accolades received by Giorgio Moroder
Organization	Year	Honor	Ref.
Dance Music Hall of Fame	2004	Inductee (Producer)	
