= Love Has a Mind of Its Own =

Single by Donna Summer

from the album She Works Hard for the Money
- B-side: "People, People"
- Released: December 1983 (US); April 1984 (Europe)
- Recorded: 1983
- Genre: Pop; soul; R&B
- Length: 3:42
- Label: Mercury
- Songwriter(s): Donna Summer; Bruce Sudano; Michael Omartian
- Producer(s): Michael Omartian

Donna Summer singles chronology
"Unconditional Love" (1983)	"Love Has a Mind of Its Own" (1983)	"There Goes My Baby" (1984)

Donna Summer & Matthew Ward singles chronology
"Stop, Look and Listen" (1984)	"Love Has a Mind of Its Own" (1983)	"There Goes My Baby" (1984)

"Love Has a Mind of Its Own" is a song from She Works Hard for the Money, the 1983 album by Donna Summer. The song was written by Summer, Bruce Sudano and Michael Omartian, and produced by Omartian. It was issued as the third and final single in December 1983 by Mercury Records from the LP, all of which became chart hits in the US.

A ballad, it is performed as a duet with 2nd Chapter of Acts singer Matthew Ward, although he is uncredited on the sleeve. The single was released internationally in 1984, but had first been issued in this form in the US and Japan the previous year.

"Love Has a Mind of Its Own" charted on three U.S. charts. It peaked at number 70 on the Billboard Hot 100 and number 35 on the US R&B chart. The song did best on the Adult Contemporary chart, where it reached number 19 and remained on the charts for 12 weeks.

== Chart history ==
Chart (1984)	Peak position
US Billboard Hot 100	70
US Billboard Adult Contemporary	19
US Billboard Hot Black Singles	35
US Cash Box Top 100	77
