= The Woman in Me (Donna Summer song) =

1982 single by Donna Summer

Single by Donna Summer

from the album Donna Summer
- B-side: "Livin' in America"
- Released: December 1982
- Genre: Pop
- Length: 3:55
- Label: Geffen
- Songwriters: Michael Clark; John Bettis
- Producer: Quincy Jones

Donna Summer singles chronology
| "I Feel Love (Patrick Cowley Remix)" (1982) | "The Woman in Me" (1982) | "Protection" (1982) |

Music video
- "The Woman in Me" on YouTube

"The Woman in Me" is a song by American singer Donna Summer, released as the third and final single from her eponymous tenth studio album (1982). The song reached number 33 on the Billboard Hot 100, number 30 on the Black Singles chart, and number 17 on the Adult Contemporary chart in early 1983. It was written by John Bettis of Carpenters fame.

In the UK, the single was also released on 12-inch blue vinyl featuring oversized colour picture labels. Side two included the song "Livin' in America" from the same album and "The Wanderer", title track to the 1980 album.

== Music video ==
The music video features Summer in a blue dress singing and standing at a room with an unidentified man standing by the door followed by changing colors. The video shows Summer from the chest up as she was pregnant with Amanda Grace at the time.

== Charts ==
| Chart (1982–1983) | Peak position |
|---|---|
| Belgium (Ultratop 50 Flanders) | 10 |
| Canada Adult Contemporary (RPM) | 3 |
| Netherlands (Dutch Top 40) | 7 |
| Netherlands (Single Top 100) | 12 |
| UK Singles (Official Charts) | 62 |
| US Billboard Hot 100 | 33 |
| US Adult Contemporary (Billboard) | 17 |
| US Hot R&B/Hip-Hop Songs (Billboard) | 30 |
| US Cash Box Top 100 | 28 |

== Heart version ==
"The Woman in Me"

Single by Heart

from the album Desire Walks On
- B-side: "Risin' Suspicion"
- Released: 1994
- Length: 3:58
- Label: Capitol
- Songwriters: Michael Clark; John Bettis
- Producers: John Purdell; Duane Baron

Heart singles chronology
| "Will You Be There (In the Morning)" (1993) | "The Woman in Me" (1994) | "Strong, Strong Wind" (1998) |

In 1993, American rock band Heart covered "The Woman in Me" for their eleventh studio album, Desire Walks On. It was released as a single in 1994, but it failed to chart on the Billboard Hot 100, instead peaking at number five on the Bubbling Under Hot 100 Singles chart.

=== Track listings ===
- US 7-inch jukebox single

A. "The Woman in Me" (remix) – 4:00
B. "Risin' Suspicion" – 3:04

- US cassette single

A1. "The Woman in Me" (remix) – 4:00
A2. "Risin' Suspicion" – 3:04
B1. "The Woman in Me" (remix) – 4:00
B2. "Risin' Suspicion" – 3:04

- US promotional CD single
1. "The Woman in Me" (remix) – 3:47

=== Charts ===
| Chart (1994) | Peak position |
|---|---|
| Canada Top Singles (RPM) | 13 |
| Canada Adult Contemporary (RPM) | 34 |
| US Bubbling Under Hot 100 (Billboard) | 5 |
| US Adult Contemporary (Billboard) | 24 |
