= On the Radio: Greatest Hits Volumes I & II =

Greatest hits album by Donna Summer
- Released: October 15, 1979
- Genre: Disco
- Length: 71:07
- Label: Casablanca
- Producers: Giorgio Moroder, Pete Bellotte, Gary Klein

Donna Summer chronology
Bad Girls (1979)	On the Radio: Greatest Hits Volumes I & II (1979)	Walk Away: Collector's Edition (The Best of 1977–1980) (1980)

Singles from On the Radio: Greatest Hits Volumes I & II
- 1. "No More Tears (Enough Is Enough)" Released: October 1979; 2. "On the Radio" Released: November 23, 1979

On the Radio: Greatest Hits Volumes I & II is the first internationally released greatest hits album by American singer Donna Summer, released on October 15, 1979.

The album was her fourth consecutive double album, and also made her the first person to take three consecutive double albums to the number one spot on the U.S. album chart.

This would become Summer's third multi-platinum album to date.

== Background and production ==
In the early stages of Summer's recording career, her work had been distributed in different countries by different record labels. Varying compilations had been released by these labels. In 1977, Casablanca Records (who had previously been responsible for distributing her work in the U.S.) became responsible for distributing her music in most nations and On the Radio became the first proper international compilation album released by them after years of many successful disco hits. (NB: There were still some countries, such as The Netherlands where other labels continued to distribute her work. A similar compilation was released by Philips Records in this country).

The album spanned Summer's career from her breakthrough, the raunchy "Love to Love You Baby" right through to the more rock-influenced tracks of her Bad Girls album.

The majority of the tracks were either remixed or edited, largely to fit such a big number of tracks onto two records. Each side, barring side D, runs as a continuous mix.

The compilation also contained two brand-new tracks. The first of these was the pop–disco flavored "On the Radio" (which opened the album, and closed it in a longer version). Written for the film Foxes, this song was reminiscent of some of her other hits ("Last Dance", "MacArthur Park", "Dim All the Lights") in that it started off with a slow beat. The longer version at the end of the album, like the full-length version of "Last Dance", also contained a slow part in the middle.

The title song was nominated for a Grammy in the Best Female Pop Vocal Performance category. A longer version was used on the Foxes movie soundtrack release, but omits the final "...now I'm sittin' here with the man I sent away long ago" verse, opting for a repeat of the third instead.

The second new track was a duet with Barbra Streisand entitled "No More Tears (Enough Is Enough)". Like "On the Radio", it also had a slow beginning but evolved into a disco number. An early example of girl power, the song was released as a 12" Disco single (with provocative cover – black-and-white photo of Summer and Streisand in merry widow bustiers, Streisand's favorite font used for the titles) towards the end of 1979 and hit the Number One spot on the American singles chart (making it Summer's fourth chart-topper there). It was also a big international hit, making Number Three in the U.K.

At the beginning of 1980, the shorter version of "On the Radio" was also released as a single, and became Summer's ninth Top 5 on the U.S. singles chart.

On the Radio proved to be Summer's final release with Casablanca Records. She had not been happy for some time with the label's treatment of her – she felt exploited and that she was being made to portray a sexual image with which she was not comfortable. At one point this had driven her to depression and suicide attempts. However, by 1979 she had become a born-again Christian and rediscovered herself. She signed a deal with Geffen Records in 1980.

In some territories, such as France, the compilation was also marketed (for a limited time) as two separate discs, Greatest Hits Volume 1 and Greatest Hits Volume 2, with the same track listing as each individual disc in the original double LP. Both sleeves used the identical photo, showing Summer literally 'on the radio', as the front cover of the original double LP, but reduced in size; the former against a silver background and the latter against a gold background.

== Critical reception ==
Professional ratings
Review scores
Source	Rating
AllMusic	4.5/5 stars
Christgau's Record Guide	A
Slant Magazine	4.5/5 stars

The album received acclaim by music critics.

Andy Kellman from AllMusic wrote that the album "is an almost complete anthology of her popular '70s output".

Robert Christgau gave the album an "A" and wrote that "despite the repeat of the title tune", "the overlap with Bad Girls", and the "inevitable 'MacArthur Park'" the album "proves that whatever the virtues of her disco extensions, she makes like a rock and roller at AM size."

Eric Henderson from Slant Magazine gave the album four and a half stars out of five and wrote that the album "is perhaps the most well-timed greatest hits package ever" and that "it's also a testament to Summer's undeniable fascination with the changing tides of popular music". He also said that "until Madonna's The Immaculate Collection, one could scarcely imagine a more compelling argument on behalf of the artistic merit of quintessentially singles artists." Slant Magazine included it on their 2003 list of 50 Essential Vital Pop Albums.

== Commercial performance ==
Despite being a double album, a number of Summer's Billboard Hot 100 hits were left off On the Radio; "Could It Be Magic" from A Love Trilogy, "Spring Affair" and "Winter Melody" from Four Seasons of Love, and "Rumour Has It" from Once Upon a Time. Furthermore, two songs from I Remember Yesterday were omitted; the top 20 R&B hit "Can't We Just Sit Down (And Talk It Over)" and the UK Top 5 single "Love's Unkind", as was "The Hostage", a top ten European hit from Summer's debut album, Lady of the Night.

Following Summer's death in 2012, the album re-entered the Billboard 200 at number 73.

== Track listing ==
All tracks produced by Giorgio Moroder and Pete Bellotte except "On the Radio" and "On the Radio (long version)" by Moroder, and "No More Tears (Enough Is Enough)" by Gary Klein and Moroder.

Side one
No.	Title	Writer(s)	Length
1.	"On the Radio" (from the soundtrack Foxes, 1980)	Moroder; Donna Summer	4:00
2.	"Love to Love You Baby" (from Love to Love You Baby, 1975)	Bellotte; Moroder; Summer	4:07
3.	"Try Me, I Know We Can Make It" (from A Love Trilogy, 1976)	Bellotte; Moroder; Summer	3:24
4.	"I Feel Love" (from I Remember Yesterday, 1977)	Bellotte; Moroder; Summer	3:20
5.	"Our Love" (from Bad Girls, 1979)	Moroder; Summer	3:43
Total length:			18:34

Side two
No.	Title	Writer(s)	Length
1.	"I Remember Yesterday" (from I Remember Yesterday, 1977)	Bellotte; Moroder; Summer	4:46
2.	"I Love You" (from Once Upon a Time, 1977)	Bellotte; Moroder; Summer	3:12
3.	"Heaven Knows" (duet with Brooklyn Dreams; from Live and More, 1978)	Bellotte; Greg Mathieson; Moroder; Summer	3:30
4.	"Last Dance" (from the soundtrack Thank God It's Friday, 1978)	Paul Jabara	4:56
Total length:			16:24

Side three
No.	Title	Writer(s)	Length
1.	"MacArthur Park" (from Live and More, 1978)	Jimmy Webb	3:54
2.	"Hot Stuff" (from Bad Girls, 1979)	Bellotte; Harold Faltermeyer; Keith Forsey	2:54
3.	"Bad Girls" (from Bad Girls, 1979)	Joe "Bean" Esposito; Eddie Hokenson; Bruce Sudano; Summer	3:05
4.	"Dim All the Lights" (from Bad Girls, 1979)	Summer	4:11
5.	"Sunset People" (from Bad Girls, 1979)	Bellotte; Faltermeyer; Forsey	4:32
Total length:			18:36

Side four
No.	Title	Writer(s)	Length
1.	"No More Tears (Enough Is Enough)" (duet with Barbra Streisand; from Wet, 1979)	Jabara; Bruce Roberts	11:43
2.	"On the Radio" (long version; from the soundtrack Foxes, 1980)	Moroder; Summer	5:50
Total length:			17:33

== Charts ==
=== Weekly charts ===
Chart (1979–80)	Peak position
Australian Albums (Kent Music Report)	16
Canada Top Albums/CDs (RPM)	10
Dutch Albums (Album Top 100)	40
Finnish Albums (Suomen virallinen lista)	19
French Albums (SNEP)	2
German Albums (Offizielle Top 100)	42
Italian Albums (Musica e dischi)	10
Japanese Albums (Oricon)	20
New Zealand Albums (RMNZ)	2
Norwegian Albums (VG-lista)	39
Spanish Albums (Promusicae)	11
Swedish Albums (Sverigetopplistan)	29
UK Albums (Official Charts)	24
US Billboard 200	1
US Top R&B/Hip-Hop Albums (Billboard)	4
Chart (2012–17)	Peak position
US Top Album Sales (Billboard)	73
US Top Catalog Albums (Billboard)	5
US Top Dance Albums (Billboard)	15

=== Year-end charts ===
Chart (1980)	Position
New Zealand Albums (RMNZ)	39

== Certifications and sales ==
Region	Certification	Certified units/sales
Canada (Music Canada)	Platinum	100,000^{^}
France	—	100,000
New Zealand (RMNZ)	Platinum	15,000^{^}
United Kingdom (BPI)	Gold	150,000
United Kingdom (BPI) 1993 release	Silver	60,000^{‡}
United States (RIAA)	2× Platinum	2,000,000^{^}
^{^} Shipments figures based on certification alone.^{‡} Sales+streaming figures based on certification alone.
