= Love Is in Control (Finger on the Trigger) =

Single by Donna Summer

from the album Donna Summer
- B-side: "Sometimes Like Butterflies"
- Released: June 1, 1982
- Genre: Synth-funk; dance
- Length: 4:19
- Label: Geffen (US); Warner Bros. (Europe)
- Songwriters: Quincy Jones; Rod Temperton; Merria Ross
- Producer: Quincy Jones

Donna Summer singles chronology
"Who Do You Think You're Foolin'" (1981)	"Love Is in Control (Finger on the Trigger)" (1982)	"State of Independence" (1982)

Music video
- "Love Is in Control (Finger on the Trigger)" on YouTube

"Love Is in Control (Finger on the Trigger)" is the lead single to American singer Donna Summer's eponymous tenth studio album (1982). The track was nominated at the 25th Annual Grammy Awards in 1983 for Best Female R&B Vocal Performance.

== Background ==
Summer's previous studio album The Wanderer (1980) — her inaugural release on Geffen Records — had been certified gold in America although it did not enjoy numerous hit singles as some of her '70s releases had enjoyed. Summer had prepped her next studio album, which would be released in 1996 as I'm a Rainbow — a double set which continued her association with Giorgio Moroder and Pete Bellotte, but David Geffen, decided to cancel the project, and assigned Summer to record an album with producer Quincy Jones. Jones was a much sought-after producer at the time, particularly due to his association with Michael Jackson's album Off the Wall (1979).

"Love Is in Control (Finger on the Trigger)" was the lead single off the Jones' produced studio album Donna Summer. It was written by Jones and Rod Temperton (formerly of funk band Heatwave) — who'd also written Jackson's "Rock with You". Summer reported that the recording process for this album was challenging, as she was pregnant at the time and unhappy over I'm a Rainbow being shelved by Geffen Records.

The single was issued in three different versions: the 7" single release (3:42), the LP version (4:19), and a 12" single version (7:04). The 12" version features a "Dance Remix" on side one and an "Instrumental Version featuring Ernie Watts on Sax Solo" on side two. Both are remixes by Craig Kostich and Bruce Swedien.

== Music video ==
A music video features Donna Summer dancing in a room full of pop art. She wore a black satin outfit to disguise her pregnancy as she was expecting her baby, Amanda Grace. The video also featured clips of Summer dancing during a photo shoot wearing a blue dress with a large belt to cover her stomach. The same dress (outfit) is what she is wearing on the cover for the single and album.

== Reception ==
"Love Is in Control (Finger on the Trigger)" became a major hit, peaking at no. 10 on the US Billboard Hot 100 on the week of September 25, 1982, giving Summer her sixteenth top 40 hit, and reaching no. 4 on the US R&B chart. It was Summer's best R&B showing since "Bad Girls" in 1979—even using police whistles in the song as in "Bad Girls".

== Charts ==
=== Weekly charts ===
Weekly chart performance for "Love Is in Control (Finger on the Trigger)"
Chart (1982)	Peak position
Australia (Kent Music Report)	17
Belgium (Ultratop 50 Flanders)	13
Canada Top Singles (RPM)	4
Finland (Suomen virallinen lista)	3
France (IFOP)	48
Ireland (IRMA)	14
Italy (Musica e dischi)	14
Netherlands (Dutch Top 40)	6
Netherlands (Single Top 100)	12
New Zealand (Recorded Music NZ)	40
Norway (VG-lista)	3
South Africa (Springbok Radio)	7
Spain (AFYVE)	5
Sweden (Sverigetopplistan)	13
Switzerland (Schweizer Hitparade)	5
UK Singles (Official Charts)	18
US Billboard Hot 100	10
US Dance Club Songs (Billboard)	3
US Hot Black Singles (Billboard)	4
US Cash Box Top 100 Singles	11

=== Year-end charts ===
Chart (1982)	Position
Belgium (Ultratop 50 Flanders)	51
Netherlands (Dutch Top 40)	59
Netherlands (Single Top 100)	73
US Billboard Hot 100	59
US Cash Box	69

== B-side ==
The B-side of the "Love Is in Control" 7" single, "Sometimes Like Butterflies", was a non-album track co-written by Summer herself. It was finally released on CD on the 2014 reissue and was also covered in 1985 by Dusty Springfield.
