= Donna Summer (album) =

Studio album by Donna Summer
- Released: July 19, 1982
- Recorded: December 1981 – April 1982
- Studios: Westlake, Los Angeles; Ocean Way, Nashville; Allen Zentz, Hollywood
- Genres: Pop; dance; post-disco; R&B
- Length: 41:09
- Label: Geffen
- Producer: Quincy Jones

Donna Summer chronology
I'm a Rainbow (1981)	Donna Summer (1982)	She Works Hard for the Money (1983)

Singles from Donna Summer
- 1. "Love Is in Control (Finger on the Trigger)" Released: June 1982; 2. "State of Independence" Released: September 1982; 3. "The Woman in Me" Released: November 1982; 4. "Protection" Released: December 1982 (Japan)

Professional ratings
Review scores
Source	Rating
AllMusic	3/5 stars
Robert Christgau	C
Rolling Stone	2/5 stars

Donna Summer is the tenth studio album by American singer Donna Summer, released on July 19, 1982, by Geffen Records. It featured the Top 10, Grammy-nominated "Love Is in Control (Finger on the Trigger)" single. The album itself saw a drop in chart position from her previous album, peaking at No.20, but ultimately outsold it by remaining on the Billboard 200 for 37 weeks - nearly 20 weeks more. Its longevity was aided by follow-up singles "State of Independence" and "The Woman in Me", which charted at 41 and 33 respectively.

The album marked a departure for Summer as it was produced by hit-making producer Quincy Jones, something that the record company had insisted on to ensure success, albeit falling below expectations. The recording proved a less than happy experience for Summer in part because she was pregnant with her daughter Amanda Grace at the time.

On its 40th anniversary in 2022, Donna Summer's estate announced a re-issue of the album with one unreleased track, which was originally a B-side on the lead single.

== Background ==
Having left Casablanca Records, with whom she had had some of the biggest selling and most popular hits of the disco era in the 1970s, Summer had signed to Geffen Records in 1980 and had continued working with Giorgio Moroder and Pete Bellotte, with whom she had written the vast majority of her hits. However, label owner David Geffen had been disappointed with the chart performance of Summer's previous studio album The Wanderer (1980), Summer's debut studio album for Geffen and rather than release the follow-up I'm a Rainbow, which Summer had recorded with Moroder and Bellotte in 1981, Geffen had Summer record a new studio album with Quincy Jones from whom a production credit – given Jones' track record, particularly his work with Michael Jackson – Geffen felt would guarantee a commercial smash. The resultant Donna Summer album was the first time that Summer had worked with a producer other than Moroder and Bellotte since 1974 save for the one-off track "Down Deep Inside" which was produced by John Barry for the film The Deep (1977), and the "No More Tears (Enough Is Enough)" duet with Barbra Streisand which was co-produced by Gary Klein.

== Writing and recording ==
Since the disco era, Summer's work had covered a variety of musical genres and this album was no exception. It had quite a strong soul influence, and featured a couple of gospel-styled tracks, namely "(If It) Hurts Just a Little" and a cover version of Jon and Vangelis' "State of Independence", which featured an all-star choir. Rock music was also found in the form of the Bruce Springsteen-penned "Protection"; the track had been planned as a Donna Summer and Bruce Springsteen duet but that concept was abandoned as unworkable. The album concluded with Summer's take on the Billy Strayhorn torch standard "Lush Life". The song "Mystery of Love" used the opening material from Bach's "The Well-Tempered Clavier", Book 1: Prelude and Fugue No. 2 in C minor for the keyboard part in the introduction and verse.

Several very popular songwriters were used on this album. As well as the aforementioned Springsteen, Vangelis and Jon Anderson, Quincy Jones himself contributed to the writing, as did other names such as Rod Temperton, Merria Ross, John Lang, Richard Page, Bill Meyers, Michael Clark, John Bettis, David Foster, Steve Lukather, Michael Sembello, Dan Sembello and David Batteau. This made it the largest number of songwriters ever to contribute to a Donna Summer studio album.

A period of six months elapsed between the first session for the Donna Summer album and the completion of the tracks. Summer later stated that this was one of the hardest albums ever to record – some of the songs were quite challenging, plus she was pregnant with her daughter Amanda Grace at the time. It was also reported that she found producer Quincy Jones to be rather boisterous and controlling and soon after the album's release she opened up to the Los Angeles Times: "Sometimes I feel it's a Quincy Jones album that I sang on".

== Release ==
The Donna Summer album was released July 19, 1982, with the advance single: "Love Is in Control (Finger on the Trigger)" having been issued six weeks previous. "Love Is in Control" would peak at No. 10 on the Billboard Hot 100 in September 1982 when the Donna Summer album would reach No. 20 in Billboard; the album's subsequent single releases: "State of Independence" and "The Woman in Me", which respectively peaked on the Hot 100 at Nos. 41 and 33, kept the album within the Billboard 200.

Ultimately the Donna Summer album would fall short of its goal to restore Summer to the level of stardom she'd enjoyed in the 1970s: "Love Is in Control" would have the lowest Hot 100 peak of a lead single from an album of new material by Summer since 1977 and the No. 20 peak of the Donna Summer album evidenced a further drop in popularity from Summer's debut studio album of the 1980s: The Wanderer, whose No. 13 peak had disappointed David Geffen to the point where he'd suppressed the follow-up album Summer had prepared with Giorgio Moroder and Pete Bellotte instigating the Quincy Jones-produced Donna Summer album project (see I'm a Rainbow).

"Love Is in Control" did represent a considerable comeback for Summer on the R&B charts with a No. 4 peak affording Summer her fifth Top 5 R&B hit. Summer also reached the UK Top 20 with both "Love Is in Control" and "State of Independence" with these tracks both reaching the Top Ten in the Netherlands – at respectively Nos. 6 and 1 – where "The Woman in Me" reached No. 7.

The aforementioned advance single "Love Is in Control" featured a non-album track on its B-side: "Sometimes Like Butterflies", a song that Summer penned with Bruce Roberts. This song would later be covered by Dusty Springfield, and Summer's original version was included on the CD, A Different Love by Canadian singer, Mark Tara, as a benefit for Canadian Foundation for AIDS Research (CANFAR. Quincy Jones is credited as producer for this song as well, although the minimalistic approach to this song was very different from the tracks included on the Donna Summer album.

French electronic duo Cassius sampled "(If It) Hurts Just a Little" on their 1999 single "Cassius 99 Remix".

On April 23, 2022, Donna Summer was re-released as a 40th anniversary picture disc as a Record Store Day exclusive. Only 3,500 copies were released.

== Track listing ==
Side one
No.	Title	Writer(s)	Length
1.	"Love Is in Control (Finger on the Trigger)"	Quincy Jones; Merria Ross; Rod Temperton	4:18
2.	"Mystery of Love"	John Lang; Bill Meyers; Richard Page	4:25
3.	"The Woman in Me"	John Bettis; Michael Clark	3:55
4.	"State of Independence"	Jon Anderson; Vangelis	5:50

Side two
No.	Title	Writer(s)	Length
1.	"Livin' in America"	David Foster; Jones; Steve Lukather; Donna Summer; Temperton	4:41
2.	"Protection"	Bruce Springsteen	3:35
3.	"(If It) Hurts Just a Little"	David Batteau; Dan Sembello; Michael Sembello	3:52
4.	"Love Is Just a Breath Away"	Foster; Summer; Temperton	3:55
5.	"Lush Life"	Billy Strayhorn	6:26
Total length:			41:09

2014 Demon Music Group bonus tracks
No.	Title	Writer(s)	Length
10.	"Sometimes like Butterflies (B-side of "Love Is in Control (Finger on the Trigger)"	Bruce Roberts; Summer	4:30
11.	"Love Is in Control (Finger on the Trigger)" (7" Version)	Jones; Ross; Temperton	3:42
12.	"Love Is in Control (Finger on the Trigger)" (Dance Remix)	Jones; Ross; Temperton	7:03
13.	"Love Is in Control (Finger on the Trigger)" (Instrumental version featuring Ernie Watts on saxophone)	Jones; Ross; Temperton	7:03
14.	"State of Independence" (7" Version)	Anderson; Vangelis	4:27
15.	"State of Independence" (N.R.G. Mix)	Anderson; Vangelis	5:38
16.	"State of Independence" (New Radio Millennium Mix)	Anderson; Vangelis	5:03

== Personnel ==
- Donna Summer – lead vocals, backing vocals (1, 7)
- Michael Boddicker – Polymoog (1), vocoder (1), synthesizer programming (2, 4, 5, 7, 9), drum programming (4), vocoder programming (5)
- Greg Phillinganes – Yamaha Portasound (1), synthesizers (1, 4–7), Synclavier II (2), synth bass (2, 9)
- David Paich – acoustic piano (2), synthesizers (2, 4, 6, 7, 8), keyboards (3)
- Steve Porcaro – synthesizer programming (2, 4–7), drum programming (3, 5, 8), synthesizers (8)
- Don Dorsey – Synclavier II programming (2), Synclavier II (4), synthesizer programming (4, 9)
- David Foster – synthesizers (5, 8)
- Roy Bittan – acoustic piano (6)
- Dave Grusin – synthesizers (9), Fender Rhodes (9)
- Michael Sembello – guitars (1, 2, 5, 7), backing vocals (7)
- Steve Lukather – guitars (3, 5, 6, 8)
- Bruce Springsteen – guitars (6)
- Louis Johnson – bass guitar (2, 4, 6)
- Leon "Ndugu" Chancler – drums (1, 2, 4, 7, 9)
- Larry Bunker – drums (5)
- Harvey Mason – drums (5)
- Joe Porcaro – drums (5)
- John Robinson – drums (5)
- Jeff Porcaro – drums (6)
- Paulinho da Costa – percussion (1, 2, 4, 7)
- Rini Kramer – percussion (5)
- Ernie Watts – tenor saxophone (1, 4, 9), horns (1, 2, 5, 7), alto saxophone (6), baritone saxophone (6)
- Bill Reichenbach Jr. – horns (1, 2, 5, 7)
- Gary Grant – horns (1, 2, 5, 7)
- Jerry Hey – horns (1, 2, 5, 7)
- Howard Hewett – backing vocals (1, 5)
- James Ingram – backing vocals (1–5, 7)
- Phillip Ingram – backing vocals (1, 5)
- Bill Champlin – backing vocals (2, 3, 4)
- Steve George – backing vocals (2, 3, 4)
- Richard Page – backing vocals (2, 3, 4)
- Cruz Baca Sembello – backing vocals (7)
- Pamela Quinlan – backing vocals (2, 3, 4, 7)
- Liza Miller – backing vocals (7)

All-Star Choir on "State of Independence"

- Dara Lynn Bernard, Dyan Cannon, Christopher Cross, James Ingram, Michael Jackson, Peggy Lipton Jones, Quincy Jones, Kenny Loggins, Michael McDonald, Lionel Richie, Brenda Russell, Donna Summer, Dionne Warwick and Stevie Wonder

Choir on "Livin' In America"

- Dara Lynn Bernard, Patrick Crotty Jr., Deirdre Dantzler Ribeiro, Michael Davis, Tonya DeWalt, Debra Green, James Ingram, Kidada Jones, Rashida Jones, Shanté Lewis, Heather Mason, Greg Phillinganes, Dina Rich, Cynthia Spears, Deirdre Spears, Bernard Walton, Pamela Quinlan, Lynn T. Walton and Faith D. Wong – singers
- H. B. Barnum – director
- Billie Barnum – supervisor
- Dennis Cosby – conductor
- Guy Spells – conductor

Arrangements

- Quincy Jones – rhythm arrangements (1, 2, 4, 5, 7, 9), vocal arrangements (1, 4, 5, 7), synthesizer arrangements (2, 4, 5, 7)
- Rod Temperton – rhythm arrangements (1, 4, 5, 7), vocal arrangements (1, 4), synthesizer arrangements (5, 7)
- James Ingram – rhythm arrangements (1), vocal arrangements (1)
- Jerry Hey – horn arrangements (1, 2, 5, 7)
- Bill Meyers – rhythm arrangements (2), synthesizer arrangements (2)
- Greg Phillinganes – rhythm arrangements (2), synthesizer arrangements (2)
- David Paich – rhythm arrangements (2, 4), synthesizer arrangements (2, 3), arrangements (8)
- Michael Omartian – string arrangements (2)
- Richard Page – vocal arrangements (3)
- Greg Mathieson – synthesizer arrangements (4)
- Harvey Mason – arrangements (5)
- David Foster– rhythm arrangements (5), synthesizer arrangements (5), arrangements (8)
- Michael Sembello – rhythm arrangements (7), synthesizer arrangements (7), vocal arrangements (7)
- Johnny Mandel – string arrangements (9)
- Dave Grusin – rhythm arrangements (9), synthesizer arrangements (9)

=== Production ===
- Quincy Jones – producer
- Bruce Swedien – engineer, mixing
- Steve Crimmel – assistant engineer
- Matt Forger – assistant engineer, technical director
- John Van Nest– assistant engineer
- Bernie Grundman – mastering
- Jeff Lancaster – art direction, design
- Chris Whorf – art direction, design
- David Alexander – photography

== Charts ==
=== Weekly charts ===
Chart (1982)	Peak position
Australia (Kent Music Report)	45
Austrian Albums (Ö3 Austria)	19
Canada Top Albums/CDs (RPM)	32
Dutch Albums (Album Top 100)	4
Finnish Albums (Suomen virallinen lista)	3
French Albums (SNEP)	17
German Albums (Offizielle Top 100)	37
Italian Albums (Musica e dischi)	17
Japanese Albums (Oricon)	20
Norwegian Albums (VG-lista)	3
Spanish Albums (Promusicae)	9
Swedish Albums (Sverigetopplistan)	2
UK Albums (Official Charts)	13
US Billboard 200	20
US Top R&B/Hip-Hop Albums (Billboard)	6
US Cashbox Top Albums	14

=== Year-end charts ===
Chart (1982)	Position
Dutch Albums (Album Top 100)	16

=== Single ===
Year	Single	Chart	Position
1982	"Love Is in Control (Finger on the Trigger)"	United Kingdom	18
1982	"Love Is in Control (Finger on the Trigger)"	US Billboard Hot 100	10
1982	"Love Is in Control (Finger on the Trigger)"	Netherlands	6
1982	"Love Is in Control (Finger on the Trigger)"	Norway	3
1982	"Love Is in Control (Finger on the Trigger)"	Sweden	13
1982	"State of Independence"	United Kingdom	14
1982	"State of Independence"	US Billboard Hot 100	41
1982	"State of Independence"	Netherlands	1
1982	"The Woman in Me"	Netherlands	7
1983	"The Woman in Me"	United Kingdom	62
1983	"The Woman in Me"	US Billboard Hot 100	33

== Certifications and sales ==
Certifications for Donna Summer
Region	Certification	Certified units/sales
Netherlands (NVPI)	Gold	50,000^{^}
United States (RIAA)	Gold	500,000^{^}
^{^} Shipments figures based on certification alone.
