= Walk Away (Donna Summer song) =

- French picture sleeve

Single by Donna Summer

from the album Bad Girls
- B-side: "Could It Be Magic"
- Released: September 1, 1980
- Recorded: 1979
- Genre: Pop, disco
- Length: 4:30
- Label: Casablanca
- Songwriters: Pete Bellotte, Harold Faltermeyer
- Producers: Giorgio Moroder, Bellotte

Donna Summer singles chronology
"Our Love" (1980)	"Walk Away" (1980)	"The Wanderer" (1980)

"Walk Away" is a song by American singer Donna Summer from her seventh studio album Bad Girls (1979). It was released as the sixth and final single from the album on September 1, 1980.

== Overview ==
The album had been released on Casablanca Records, with whom Summer had some of her biggest hits during the disco era. However, after a heated and much-publicized dispute, Donna left the label and in 1980 filed a lawsuit against them which was later settled.

Donna signed to Geffen Records and began working on a new album that would distance herself from the suddenly passé disco genre. In an effort to assert their contractual control and milk the run of success they had enjoyed with Summer, Casablanca not only released the single "Walk Away" but issued a collector's edition compilation album of the same name.

When first released, Casablanca promoted it as a Double-A side single, with a re-release of her 1976 hit "Could It Be Magic" on the flip side. Although Billboard magazine reviewed it as such, radio was receptive only to the more contemporary-sounding "Walk Away", so the magazine noted only the A-side during its charting on the Hot 100, where it peaked at number 36 in October 1980.

The 12" single version, at 7:15, would later be released on The Dance Collection: A Compilation of Twelve Inch Singles CD, in 1987, to compete with Summer's new release All Systems Go.

== Critical reception ==
Stephen Holden, in his review of the album Bad Girls for Rolling Stone, noted that Summer had never sounded so playful and sophisticated as in the song "Walk Away".

== Charts ==
Chart performance for "Walk Away"
Chart (1979–1980)	Peak position
US Billboard Hot 100	36
US Hot R&B/Hip-Hop Songs (Billboard)	35
