= Who Do You Think You're Foolin' =

- Picture sleeve for most overseas releases

Single by Donna Summer

from the album The Wanderer
- B-side: "Running for Cover"
- Released: February 1981
- Genre: Glam rock
- Length: 4:18; 3:59 (7"); 5:38 (Dance Mix); 8:01 (12")
- Label: Geffen
- Songwriters: Pete Bellotte, Sylvester Levay, Jerry Rix
- Producers: Giorgio Moroder, Pete Bellotte

Donna Summer singles chronology
"Cold Love" (1980)	"Who Do You Think You're Foolin'" (1981)	"Love Is in Control (Finger on the Trigger)" (1982)

"Who Do You Think You're Foolin'" is a song by American singer Donna Summer from her album The Wanderer. The song was written by Pete Bellotte, Sylvester Levay and Jerry Rix and produced by Bellotte and Giorgio Moroder. Though not a big hit, it briefly made the Top 40 in the U.S. during the spring of 1981.

The song was remixed in the early 2000s on an independent DJ label to a more current electronica beat and was a hit in gay discos in larger American urban centers.

== Track listing ==
1. "Who Do You Think You're Foolin'" (Bellotte, Levay, Rix) - 3:59
2. "Running For Cover" (Summer) - 3:47

== Chart positions ==
Chart (1980/81)	Peak position
Australia Kent Music Report	100
US Billboard Hot 100	40
US Billboard Dance Music/Club Play Singles	8^{[A]}
US Cashbox Top Singles	38

Notes

- A Chart placing refers to the chart placing of The Wanderer. All tracks from The Wanderer album charted together on the Billboard Dance Music/Club Play Singles chart.
