= Protection (Donna Summer song) =

Single by Donna Summer

from the album Donna Summer
- B-side: "(If It) Hurts Just A Little"
- Released: December 1982 (Japan); 1983 (EU)
- Studio: Westlake Audio, Los Angeles
- Genre: Rock
- Length: 3:35
- Label: Warner Bros. (Belgium)
- Songwriter: Bruce Springsteen
- Producer: Quincy Jones

Donna Summer singles chronology
"The Woman in Me" (1982)	"Protection" (1982)	"Love to Love You Baby (re-issue)" (1983)

"Protection" is a song by Donna Summer, originally featured on her 1982 self-titled album produced by Quincy Jones. Written by Bruce Springsteen, the song was released as a single in Belgium and Japan and was nominated for a Grammy Award as Best Female Rock Vocal Performance. In 1997 it was also included on One Step Up/Two Steps Back: The Songs Of Bruce Springsteen.

David Geffen approached Jon Landau, Springsteen's manager and producer, and asked if Springsteen would be interested in writing a song for Summer, who had recently signed for Geffen Records. Springsteen agreed to do so; while working with Gary U.S. Bonds, he gathered the E Street Band to record a demo. However, when Landau heard the result, "Cover Me", he persuaded Springsteen to keep that song for himself. Springsteen then wrote "Protection". He recorded a version with the E Street Band at The Hit Factory during January or February 1982 and registered it at the United States Copyright Office on March 8, 1982. In the same month Springsteen and Roy Bittan also traveled to Los Angeles to help record Summer's version of the song. Springsteen played the guitar solo and sang backing vocals. Springsteen's own version of the song was seriously considered for Born in the U.S.A., however it remains unreleased. The song peaked at No. 26 on the Spanish Los 40 chart in 1983, and reached number 39 in France.

== Personnel ==
=== Musicians ===
- Donna Summer – lead vocals, cody
- Bruce Springsteen – guitar solo, backing vocals
- Ernie Watts – saxophones
- Steve Lukather – guitars
- David Paich – synthesizers
- Greg Phillinganes – synthesizers
- Roy Bittan – acoustic piano
- Louis Johnson – bass
- Jeff Porcaro – drums
- Steve Porcaro – synthesizer programming

=== Production ===
- Quincy Jones – producer
- Bruce Swedien – engineer, mixing
