= The Wanderer (Donna Summer album) =

Studio album by Donna Summer
- Released: October 20, 1980
- Recorded: March–July 1980
- Studios: Westlake Audio and Rusk Sound (Hollywood, California)
- Genres: Rock; new wave
- Length: 39:17
- Label: Geffen
- Producers: Giorgio Moroder, Pete Bellotte

Donna Summer chronology
Walk Away: Collector's Edition (The Best of 1977–1980) (1980)	The Wanderer (1980)	I'm a Rainbow (1981)

Singles from The Wanderer
- 1. "The Wanderer" Released: September 20, 1980; 2. "Cold Love" Released: November 29, 1980; 3. "Who Do You Think You're Foolin'" Released: February 21, 1981

The Wanderer is the eighth studio album by American singer-songwriter Donna Summer, released on October 20, 1980. It marks a musical departure for Summer, being an album influenced by rock and new wave whilst previous albums all fell under the disco music category. Her inaugural release of the Geffen Records label, it became a top 20 album in the United States, with the title track reaching No. 3 on the Billboard Hot 100; other singles failed to enter the top ten. However, the record was less successful on the charts than her previous album Bad Girls, which topped the Billboard 200 for five weeks.

This album had been out of print, but was re-released on December 9, 2014, on the Driven by the Music label with remastered and bonus tracks, alongside all her other albums released during the 1980s (excluding She Works Hard for the Money). A reissue was released for purchasing and streaming for the 40th anniversary of the album on October 16, 2020. It features the original tracks and seven additional remix tracks.

The album sold over 600,000 copies in the United States.

== Background and release ==
Summer had made her name the previous decade as the most successful female artist of the disco genre, releasing a vast selection of hit singles and albums on Casablanca Records. During this period however, Summer had felt that the label had exploited her and made her portray a sexually orientated image ("The First Lady of Love") with which she never felt comfortable. The label had also taken over other elements of Summer's personal life, to the point where she felt she had no control over her life or career. Having come out of a period of depression and rediscovering her Christian faith, Summer had made the decision to break away from Casablanca and file a lawsuit against them. After leaving Casablanca, Summer became the first artist to be signed to the newly established Geffen Records.

By 1980, banners reading "disco sucks" were seen everywhere and disco records became flops. Summer decided to leave the disco sound behind. The album was co-written and produced by Giorgio Moroder and Pete Bellotte, who had produced the vast majority of Summer's hits since their partnership with her began in 1974. Production for The Wanderer was rushed; Geffen wanted to get new product out because of Casablanca's plans to release Walk Away, another greatest hits collection. "We would have liked to do more tweaking, and have more time for production. But we just had to let it go," said Harold Faltermeyer about the recording of the album.

"Cold Love" gained Summer a Grammy nomination for Best Female Rock Vocal Performance. Summer's rediscovered Christian faith was documented in the gospel song "I Believe in Jesus", for which she also received a nomination for Best Inspirational Performance. As a child Summer had sung in gospel choirs, so this song was a chance for her to go back to her roots.

== Critical and commercial reception ==
Professional ratings
Review scores
Source	Rating
AllMusic	4.5/5 stars
Robert Christgau	A−
Rolling Stone	4.5/5 stars

The album peaked at number 13 on the Billboard album chart – selling 600,000 copies in the US – and the title track hit number 3 on the US singles chart. However, two follow-up singles – "Cold Love" and "Who Do You Think You're Foolin'" – barely reached the top 40. The album and its singles attained limited success on the UK charts. None of the singles cracked the UK top 40. Critics, however, were largely positive. Village Voice rock critic Robert Christgau wrote, "She loves a good hook the way she loves her own child. And you can (still) dance to her." Bil Carpenter, in his review for AllMusic, elected "Cold Love" and "Night Life" as the best songs of the album.

== Track listing ==
Side one
No.	Title	Writer(s)	Length
1.	"The Wanderer"	Donna Summer, Giorgio Moroder	3:47
2.	"Looking Up"	Pete Bellotte, Moroder, Summer	3:57
3.	"Breakdown"	Harold Faltermeyer, Bellotte	4:08
4.	"Grand Illusion"	Moroder, Summer	3:54
5.	"Running for Cover"	Summer	4:01

Side two
No.	Title	Writer(s)	Length
1.	"Cold Love"	Keith Forsey, Bellotte, Faltermeyer	3:38
2.	"Who Do You Think You're Foolin'"	Sylvester Levay, Jerry Rix, Bellotte	4:18
3.	"Nightlife"	Bellotte, Moroder	4:00
4.	"Stop Me"	Bellotte, Forsey	3:44
5.	"I Believe in Jesus"	Summer	3:37

== Personnel ==
- Donna Summer – lead vocals
- Harold Faltermeyer – keyboards, synthesizers, arrangements (1–6, 8, 10)
- Sylvester Levay – keyboards, synthesizers, arrangements (7, 9)
- Jeff Baxter – guitars
- Steve Lukather – guitars
- Tim May – guitars
- Les Hurdle – bass
- John Pierce – bass
- Leland Sklar – bass
- Keith Forsey – drums, percussion
- Gary Herbig – saxophone solo
- Trevor Veitch – musical contractor
- Bill Champlin – backing vocals (1, 2, 3, 5–10)
- Carmen Grillo – backing vocals (1, 2, 3, 5–10)
- Tom Kelly – backing vocals (1, 2, 3, 5–10)
- Stephanie Spruill – backing vocals (4)

=== Production ===
- Pete Bellotte – producer, mixing
- Giorgio Moroder – producer, mixing
- Harold Faltermeyer – engineer, mixing
- Jürgen Koppers – engineer, mixing
- Brian Reeves – engineer
- Ken Perry – mastering at A&M Studios (Hollywood, California)
- Laurie Kanner – production coordinator
- Donna Summer – album concept
- Christopher Whorf – design
- Martin Donald – lettering
- Harry Langdon Jr. – photography

== Charts ==
Chart performance for The Wanderer
Chart (1980)	Peak position
Australian Albums (Kent Music Report)	18
Finnish Albums (Suomen virallinen lista)	9
French Albums (SNEP)	2
German Albums (Offizielle Top 100)	54
Italian Albums (Musica e dischi)	4
Japanese Albums (Oricon)	22
New Zealand Albums (RMNZ)	16
Norwegian Albums (VG-lista)	18
Spanish Albums (AFE)	8
Swedish Albums (Sverigetopplistan)	15
UK Albums (Official Charts)	55
US Billboard 200	13
US Top R&B/Hip-Hop Albums (Billboard)	12
US Cashbox Top Albums	8
Chart (2020)	Peak position
UK Independent Albums (Official Charts)	32

== Certifications and sales ==
Region	Certification	Certified units/sales
United States (RIAA)	Gold	500,000^{^}
^{^} Shipments figures based on certification alone.
