= Cold Love =

Single by Donna Summer

from the album The Wanderer
- B-side: "Grand Illusion"
- Released: November 1980
- Recorded: 1980
- Genre: Hard rock; dance-rock; new wave
- Length: 3:38; 3:11 (7" edit)
- Label: Geffen
- Songwriters: Pete Bellotte; Harold Faltermeyer; Keith Forsey
- Producers: Giorgio Moroder; Pete Bellotte

Donna Summer singles chronology
"The Wanderer" (1980)	"Cold Love" (1980)	"Who Do You Think You're Foolin'" (1981)

"Cold Love" is a song by American singer Donna Summer, released as the second single from her album The Wanderer. The song was written by Harold Faltermeyer, Keith Forsey and Pete Bellotte and produced by Bellotte and Giorgio Moroder. It peaked at No. 33 in the Billboard Hot 100, and No. 49 in Cash Box. Summer earned a Grammy nomination for Best Female Rock Vocal Performance.

Vocally, this song contrasts with the just previous "The Wanderer" single release - it is very reminiscent of her 1979 disco hit "Hot Stuff" - power belt and hard rock approach. This style was currently in vogue in the early 1980s and used by female vocalists in groups such as Heart and in Pat Benatar's "Hit Me with Your Best Shot".

== Track listing ==
7" vinyl single

1. "Cold Love" (Faltermeyer, Forsey, Bellotte) – 3:11
2. "Grand Illusion" (Donna Summer, Giorgio Moroder) – 3:51

12" vinyl single

1. "Cold Love" (Faltermeyer, Forsey, Bellotte) – 3:37
2. "Grand Illusion (Summer, Moroder) – 3:54

== Charts ==
Weekly chart performance for "Cold Love"
Chart (1980–1981)	Peak position
Ireland (IRMA)	30
UK Singles (Official Charts)	44
US Billboard Hot 100	33
US Dance Club Songs (Billboard)	8
US Cash Box Top 100	49
