= Sunset People =

- Front sleeve of the German 7-inch vinyl release

Single by Donna Summer

from the album Bad Girls
- B-side: "Our Love"
- Released: July 11, 1980
- Recorded: 1978–1979
- Genre: Disco; hi-NRG
- Length: 6:27 (album version); 3:55 (7" edit)
- Label: Casablanca
- Songwriter(s): Pete Bellotte; Harold Faltermeyer; Keith Forsey
- Producer(s): Giorgio Moroder; Pete Bellotte

Donna Summer singles chronology
"On the Radio" (1979)	"Sunset People" (1980)	"Our Love" (1980)

"Sunset People" is a song by American singer Donna Summer from her seventh studio album Bad Girls (1979). It was released as a single in some countries in 1980.

== Overview ==
Bad Girls, released on Casablanca Records in the US, had already produced several chart-topping singles for the disco star, but Summer had resigned from the label and taken a lawsuit against them. She had since signed to Geffen Records and was getting ready to release her first album with them (which had moved away from the disco sound). The single was not released in the North American market because of ongoing litigation.

The song was also used for the unsold 1985 game show pilot called Split Decision hosted by Jim McKrell.

== Critical reception ==
Stephen Holden, in his review of the album Bad Girls for Rolling Stone, noted a large social subtext in the song, which describes the whole truth about the nightmarish underside of the glamorous world of Hollywood, about the inhabitants of the Sunset Strip at night.

== Chart positions ==
Chart performance for "Sunset People"
Chart (1980)	Peak position
Netherlands (Single Top 100)	42
Netherlands (Tipparade)	14
UK Singles (OCC)	46
US Dance Club Songs (Billboard)	1

== Cover versions ==
The song was covered by E. G. Daily in 1985 for her debut album Wild Child.
