= The Wanderer (Donna Summer song) =

Single by Donna Summer

from the album The Wanderer
- B-side: "Stop Me"
- Released: September 11, 1980
- Recorded: 1980
- Genre: New wave
- Length: 3:47
- Label: Geffen; Warner Bros.
- Songwriters: Donna Summer; Giorgio Moroder
- Producers: Giorgio Moroder; Pete Bellotte

Donna Summer singles chronology
| "Walk Away" (1980) | "The Wanderer" (1980) | "Cold Love" (1980) |

"The Wanderer" is a song by American singer Donna Summer, released as the lead single from her 1980 eighth album of the same name, which was the first for her new label Geffen Records after recording her previous albums with Casablanca Records. Despite the label change, Summer continued to work with Giorgio Moroder and Pete Bellotte, who had produced the majority of her hits in the late 1970s. However, it marks a change in style for The Queen of Disco, incorporating new wave styled synth riffs and a shuffling beat.

This first 45 from the album became a big hit for Summer in the United States, peaking at number three on the Billboard Hot 100 for 3 weeks. and reaching number two in Cash Box magazine as well. It was Summer's eleventh single to sell over a million copies in the United States. In Canada, the song spent four weeks at number four. A 12" promotional single was issued, however, unlike all her Top 40 hits prior to this one it was not an extended version.

== Composition ==
"The Wanderer" incorporates heavy new wave styled synth riffs and a shuffling beat. Vocally, it was a return to her understated 1975 debut sound - soft, whispery phrases were the norm in this song, taking on an almost Elvis Presley effect, instead of the power belt she had used often since her 1977 album Once Upon a Time and 1978 hit single "Last Dance".

== Charts ==
=== Weekly charts ===
Weekly chart performance for "The Wanderer"
| Chart (1980–81) | Peak position |
|---|---|
| Australia (Kent Music Report) | 6 |
| Canada Top Singles (CBC) | 2 |
| Canada Top Singles (RPM) | 4 |
| Finland (Suomen virallinen lista) | 4 |
| France (SNEP) | 13 |
| Italy (Musica e dischi) | 3 |
| Netherlands (Dutch Top 40) | 26 |
| Netherlands (Single Top 100) | 30 |
| New Zealand (Recorded Music NZ) | 5 |
| South Africa (Springbok Radio) | 5 |
| Spain (AFE) | 4 |
| Spain Airplay (Los 40) | 8 |
| Sweden (Sverigetopplistan) | 9 |
| UK Singles (Official Charts) | 48 |
| Uruguay (Record World) | 2 |
| US Billboard Hot 100 | 3 |
| US Hot R&B/Hip-Hop Songs (Billboard) | 16 |
| US Cash Box Top 100 | 2 |

=== Year-end charts ===
Year-end chart performance for "The Wanderer"
| Chart (1980) | Position |
|---|---|
| Australia (Kent Music Report) | 65 |
| Canada Top Singles (RPM) | 63 |
| US (Joel Whitburn's Pop Annual) | 28 |

=== Certifications ===
| Region | Certification | Certified units/sales |
|---|---|---|
| United States (RIAA) | Gold | 1,000,000^{^} |
^{^} Shipments figures based on certification alone.
