= She Works Hard for the Money =

1983 single by Donna Summer

Single by Donna Summer

from the album She Works Hard for the Money
- B-side: "I Do Believe (I Fell in Love)"
- Released: May 10, 1983
- Recorded: 1983
- Genre: New wave; post-disco
- Length: 5:19 (album version); 4:35 (single edit)
- Label: Mercury
- Songwriters: Donna Summer; Michael Omartian
- Producer: Michael Omartian

Donna Summer singles chronology
"Love to Love You Baby (re-issue)" (1983)	"She Works Hard for the Money" (1983)	"Unconditional Love" (1983)

Audio
- "She Works Hard For The Money" on YouTube

"She Works Hard for the Money" is a song by American singer Donna Summer and the title track from her eleventh studio album of the same name (1983). The song was written by Michael Omartian and Summer, and produced by the former. It was released as the lead single on May 10, 1983 from the album by Mercury Records. It became a hit for Summer, reaching number one for a three-week stay atop the Billboard R&B singles chart (her first since 1979), number three on the Billboard Hot 100, and number three on the Billboard Dance Club Play chart. The single ended up as Billboard's 15th-best performing song of 1983. In addition, Summer earned a nomination for Best Female Pop Vocal Performance at the 1984 Grammy Awards, where she performed the song live as the opening for the ceremony. It became one of the biggest hits of her career and her biggest hit of the decade.

== Background and composition ==
Co-written with Omartian, the song tells a story of a hard-working blue-collar woman. It was based on Summer's inspiration she had on the night of February 23–24, 1983, after the 25th Annual Grammy Awards ceremony when she attended an after-party at the West Hollywood restaurant Chasen's. Summer encountered a restroom attendant named Onetta Johnson who was exhausted from working long hours. Summer herself described the scene in December 1986 on the television program You Write the Songs:

I was at Chasen's at a party for Julio Iglesias and I went to the ladies' room with my manager [Susan Muneo] and there was a little woman... First of all we walk in the room and we heard a TV set going, and I thought to myself "what kind of restaurant is this, that they would have a television in the ladies' room? This must be pretty posh." And so we peeked around the corner, and there was a little lady sitting there with her head tilted to the side and she was just gone—she was asleep. And the TV was just blasting loud. And I looked at her and my heart just filled up with compassion for this lady, and I thought to myself, "God, she works hard for the money, cooped up in this stinky little room all night." Then I thought about it, and I said, "She works hard for the money... She works hard for the money... Susan! She works hard for the money! This is it! This is it! I know this is it!"

Summer quickly wrote down the title and presented it the next day at the house of her producer Omartian; he helped her flesh out the words and music, to become the final song written for the album. Johnson agreed to be photographed for the album's rear cover, standing in a diner with Summer, the two wearing matching waitress outfits. The first verse of the song starts "Onetta there in the corner stand".

The song is performed in the key of G♯ minor in common time with a tempo of 136 beats per minute. Summer's vocals span from G♯_{3} to D♯_{5}.

== Reception ==
Cash Box said that the song has a "pumping bass line and steady rhythmic clip" and praised Summer's vocal performance.

== Music video ==
The accompanying music video for the song, directed by Brian Grant, debuted on MTV and became the first video by an African American female artist to be placed in "heavy rotation" (a term used by MTV at the time to indicate a frequently-aired video). The video shows a woman, working as a waitress in a diner, who is burdened with many situations in her life such as work and raising two unruly children. It is also seen that she has abandoned her hopes of being a ballerina. Summer appears as an observer through a kitchen window, a woman who assists the fallen-down protagonist of the video, and, at the end, a leader of a troupe of women, in various work uniforms, who have taken to the streets to signify their independence and gain recognition for their "hard work". The protagonist is also seen dancing in the street with them.

In a parody of the image created by this song, and its cover art picture, Summer herself appears in the Frank Sinatra video for "L.A. Is My Lady", released in 1984, as a waitress who serves a patron and then wipes her brow.

There are two versions of the music video. One is the single edit; the other remains faithful to the original length of the album version of the song.

== Charts ==
=== Weekly charts ===
Weekly chart performance for "She Works Hard for the Money"
Chart (1983)	Peak position
Argentina (CAPIF)	8
Australia (Kent Music Report)	4
Belgium (Ultratop 50 Flanders)	19
Canada Retail Singles (The Record)	5
Canada Top Singles (RPM)	4
Denmark (IFPI)	14
Finland (Suomen virallinen lista)	4
France (IFOP)	4
Ireland (IRMA)	26
Israel (Kol Yisrael)	3
Italy (Musica e dischi)	21
Netherlands (Dutch Top 40)	17
Netherlands (Single Top 100)	18
New Zealand (Recorded Music NZ)	23
Norway (VG-lista)	9
South Africa (Springbok Radio)	11
Spain (AFYVE)	8
Sweden (Sverigetopplistan)	5
Switzerland (Schweizer Hitparade)	10
UK Singles (Official Charts)	25
US Billboard Hot 100	3
US Hot Black Singles (Billboard)	1
US Dance Club Songs (Billboard)	3
US Cash Box Top 100	3
West Germany (GfK)	11

2012 weekly chart performance for "She Works Hard for the Money"
Chart (2012)	Peak position
France (SNEP)	129

=== Year-end charts ===
1983 year-end chart performance for "She Works Hard for the Money"
Chart (1983)	Position
Australia (Kent Music Report)	50
Canada Top Singles (RPM)	29
France (IFOP)	39
US Billboard Hot 100	15
US Cash Box Top 100	22
West Germany (Official German Charts)	75

== Certifications and sales ==
Region	Certification	Certified units/sales
Canada (Music Canada)	Gold	50,000^{^}
^{^} Shipments figures based on certification alone.

== See also ==
- List of number-one R&B singles of 1983 (U.S.)
