= She Works Hard for the Money (album) =

Studio album by Donna Summer
- Released: June 13, 1983
- Recorded: November 1982–March 1983
- Studios: Lion Share, Los Angeles; Hollywood Sound Recorders, Hollywood; Rhema Studio, Beverly Hills
- Genres: Dance-pop; dance-rock; soul; post-disco; new wave
- Length: 42:06
- Label: Mercury
- Producer: Michael Omartian

Donna Summer chronology
Donna Summer (1982)	She Works Hard for the Money (1983)	Cats Without Claws (1984)

Singles from She Works Hard for the Money
- 1. "She Works Hard for the Money" Released: May 1983; 2. "Unconditional Love" Released: August 1983; 3. "Love Has a Mind of Its Own" Released: December 1983

Professional ratings
Review scores
Source	Rating
AllMusic	4.5/5 stars
Robert Christgau	B+
Rolling Stone	3/5 stars

She Works Hard for the Money is the eleventh studio album by American singer Donna Summer, released on June 13, 1983, by Mercury Records. It was her most successful studio album of the decade, peaking at No. 9 on the Billboard 200 and its title track became one of the biggest hits of her career and her biggest hit of the decade, peaking at No. 3 on the Billboard Hot 100.

== Background and production ==
After emerging on Casablanca Records as the foremost female star of the disco era of the 1970s, Summer in 1980 had sued for release from Casablanca to sign with David Geffen as the inaugural artist for his Geffen label where her recordings were a comparatively modest success: also Summer and David Geffen developed a contentious relationship evidenced by Summer's 1981 studio album I'm a Rainbow being shelved and the singer being forced by Geffen to leave her longtime producer Giorgio Moroder to record the 1982 studio album Donna Summer with Quincy Jones. Although Summer considered then reteaming with Moroder (Donna Summer quote:)"I met him in New York and he played me some songs. I didn't think they were right for me."..."I was depressed [not knowing] who was producing my next album. So I prayed about it [and] Michael [Omartian] popped into my head. I had met him only once briefly at the Grammys and he said he was born again. I called his wife [Stormie Omartian], and she told me she had the same idea about him producing me....That was God at work....I could have worked with someone who wasn't born again, but I wouldn't have had that same great feeling." Michael Omartian would attribute Summer's interest in working with him to her having been impressed by the 1980 Omartian-produced #1 Christopher Cross hit "Sailing".

Since departing Casablanca Records in 1980, Summer had been involved in litigation with the label's parent company PolyGram which had cost Summer some $81.6 million in lawyer's fees by 1983, which year (Donna Summer quote:)"I told my lawyers they were fired. I went in and saw the guy at PolyGram personally", negotiating an out-of-court settlement which included Summer's Omartian-produced tracks being given to PolyGram, David Geffen having decided for the second time not to issue an album recorded by Summer. PolyGram affiliate Mercury Records issued Summer's Omartian-produced tracks as the album She Works Hard for the Money in July 1983, the title cut issued as advance single on 10 May 1983 to become Summer's biggest hit since 1979, peaking at #3 peak on the Hot 100 in Billboard where it also spent three weeks at #1 on the R&B chart with this success impelling its parent album, released June 13, 1983, to #9.

She Works Hard for the Money was more pop and dance oriented than the two precedent Donna Summer studio albums, but also contained some soulful ballads, including "Love Has a Mind of Its Own", a duet with gospel singer Matthew Ward. It also contained a reggae-styled song called "Unconditional Love" which featured vocals by young black British group Musical Youth. Lyrically, the album dealt with subjects such as social injustice ("Stop, Look and Listen"), Jesus Christ ("He's a Rebel") and missing children ("People, People"). Many fans saw the album as a "return to form" for Summer – she was once again presented as a strong, powerful woman very much in control. During the 1970s, Summer's management had worked hard to portray her as a powerful, sexual fantasy figure to the point where they had become too involved in her personal life (which led to a period of depression for Summer before becoming a born-again Christian and filing a lawsuit against her record label). Since the disco era, Summer had experimented with different genres including new wave and rock, and some felt she had got a little "lost" in trying to find her musical place in the new decade. She Works Hard for the Money received widespread acclaim from music critics and further established Summer as a prominent pop and dance artist of the 1980s.

== Release ==
Summer was credited with writing or co-writing every track on the album, mostly alongside Michael Omartian, who was also the album's producer. It became her first Top 10 album in the U.S. since 1979 and produced a massively successful hit single in the form of the title track, which was the final song written for the album. The sleeve of the single and album pictured Summer as a waitress who "works hard for the money" and the song was a tribute to "the working woman". The reverse side of the album also features Onetta Johnson, a bathroom attendant who worked at the iconic Los Angeles restaurant Chasen's whom Summer had encountered in the ladies' room and was the inspiration for the song itself. It was accompanied by a high-profile music video which became heavily promoted on MTV, soon after the breakthrough of Michael Jackson's success on the channel, leading the way for other black artists to be played. The song shot to Number 3 on the Hot 100 American singles chart, making it her biggest hit there since "The Wanderer" three years previously. The song was also given a Grammy nomination for Best Female Pop Vocal Performance.

== Singles ==
"She Works Hard for the Money" was released as the lead single on May 10, 1983. It became a hit for Summer, reaching number one for a three-week stay atop the Billboard R&B singles chart (her first since 1979), number three on the Billboard Hot 100, and number three on the Billboard Dance Club Play chart. The single ended up as Billboard's 15th-best performing song of 1983. In addition, Summer earned a nomination for Best Female Pop Vocal Performance at the 1984 Grammy Awards, where she performed the song live as the opening for the ceremony. It became one of the biggest hits of her career and her biggest hit of the decade.

Several more singles were released from the album. The aforementioned "Unconditional Love" gave Summer her fourteenth UK Top 20 hit and peaked at No. 9 on the U.S. R&B chart. "Stop, Look and Listen" peaked at No. 57 on the UK Singles Chart.

The soulful duet "Love Has a Mind of Its Own" with Matthew Ward peaked at No. 70 on the Billboard Hot 100 chart and No. 35 on the Billboard R&B Hits chart.

The song "He's a Rebel" gained Summer the Grammy award for Best Inspirational Performance, her first win since 1980. The album's closing ballad "I Do Believe (I Fell in Love)" was featured in the Netflix original series Stranger Things 2 in 2017.

== Track listing ==
Side one
No.	Title	Writer(s)	Length
1.	"She Works Hard for the Money"	Michael Omartian; Donna Summer	5:19
2.	"Stop, Look and Listen"	Omartian; Greg Phillinganes; Summer	5:52
3.	"He's a Rebel"	Jay Graydon; Omartian; Summer	4:22
4.	"Woman"	Graydon; Omartian; Bruce Sudano; Summer	4:19

Side two
No.	Title	Writer(s)	Length
1.	"Unconditional Love"	Omartian; Summer	4:42
2.	"Love Has a Mind of Its Own"	Omartian; Sudano; Summer	4:16
3.	"Tokyo"	Omartian; Sudano; Summer	4:15
4.	"People, People"	Omartian; Sudano; Summer	4:09
5.	"I Do Believe (I Fell in Love)"	Summer	4:34
Total length:			42:06

2023 deluxe edition (bonus tracks)
No.	Title	Writer(s)	Length
10.	"She Works Hard for the Money" (Club mix)	Omartian; Summer	6:18
11.	"She Works Hard for the Money" (instrumental)	Omartian; Summer	5:49
12.	"Unconditional Love" (Club mix)	Omartian; Summer	5:15
13.	"Unconditional Love" (instrumental)	Omartian; Summer	4:36

== Personnel ==
Vocals

- Donna Summer – vocals
- Musical Youth – vocals (5)
- Matthew Ward – vocals (6, 7), backing vocals
- Dara Lynn Bernard, Mary Ellen Bernard, Roberta Kelly and Pamela Quinlan – backing vocals

Musicians

- Michael Omartian – pianos, synthesizers, guitars (2), Simmons drums (2, 5), drum programming (2), accordion (9)
- Michael Boddicker – synthesizer programming
- Marty Walsh – guitars (1, 7, 8), guitar solo (1)
- Ray Parker Jr. – rhythm guitars (4)
- Jay Graydon – guitars (6, 9)
- Steve Lukather - guitar solo (1)
- Nathan East – bass guitar
- Mike Baird – drums
- John Gilston – Simmons drum programming
- Lenny Castro – congas
- Gary Herbig – saxophone (1, 7)
- Dick Hyde – horns
- Charlie Loper – horns
- Chuck Findley – horns
- Gary Grant – horns
- Jerry Hey – horns
- Assa Drori – concertmaster

Production

- Michael Omartian – producer, arrangements
- John Guess – recording, mixing
- Larry Ferguson – additional recording
- Ross Pallone – additional recording
- Bernie Grundman – mastering at A&M Mastering (Hollywood, California).
- Steve Hall – mastering at Future Disc (Hollywood, California).
- Chris Whorf – art direction, design
- Harry Langdon – photography
- Rick Hunt – CD design

== Charts and certifications ==
=== Weekly charts ===
Chart (1983)	Peak Position
Australian Albums (Kent Music Report)	21
Dutch Albums (Album Top 100)	9
Finnish Albums (Suomen virallinen lista)	8
Japanese Albums (Oricon)	27
German Albums (Offizielle Top 100)	14
New Zealand Albums (RMNZ)	47
Norwegian Albums (VG-lista)	12
Spanish Albums (Promusicae)	15
Swedish Albums (Sverigetopplistan)	8
Swiss Albums (Schweizer Hitparade)	23
UK Albums (Official Charts)	28
US Billboard 200	9
US Top R&B/Hip-Hop Albums (Billboard)	5

=== Singles ===
Year	Single	Chart	Position
1983	"She Works Hard for the Money"	US Billboard Hot 100	3
1983	"She Works Hard for the Money"	US Billboard R&B Chart	1
1983	"She Works Hard for the Money"	US Billboard Club Play Chart	3
1983	"She Works Hard for the Money"	UK Singles Chart	25
1983	"She Works Hard for the Money"	German Singles Chart	11
1983	"She Works Hard for the Money"	Irish Singles Chart	26
1983	"She Works Hard for the Money"	Netherlands Singles Chart	17
1983	"She Works Hard for the Money"	Japanese Singles Chart	52
1983	"She Works Hard for the Money"	Australian Singles Chart	4
1983	"She Works Hard for the Money"	Norwegian Singles Chart	9
1983	"Unconditional Love"	US Billboard Hot 100	43
1983	"Unconditional Love"	US R&B Chart	9
1983	"Unconditional Love"	UK Singles Chart	14
1983	"Unconditional Love"	Irish Singles Chart	28
1983	"Unconditional Love"	Australian Singles Chart	57
1984	"Stop, Look and Listen"	UK Singles Chart	57
1984	"Love Has a Mind of Its Own"	US Billboard Hot 100	70
1984	"Love Has a Mind of Its Own"	US Billboard R&B Chart	35
1984	"Love Has a Mind of Its Own"	US Billboard Adult Contemporary Chart	19

=== Certifications ===
Region	Certification	Certified units/sales
Canada (Music Canada)	Gold	50,000^{^}
France (SNEP)	Gold	100,000^{*}
United States (RIAA)	Gold	500,000^{^}
^{*} Sales figures based on certification alone.^{^} Shipments figures based on certification alone.
