= Unconditional Love (Donna Summer song) =

Single by Donna Summer

from the album She Works Hard for the Money
- B-side: "Woman"
- Released: August 1983
- Recorded: 1982–1983
- Genre: Reggae; dance-pop; post-disco
- Length: 4:43
- Label: Mercury
- Songwriters: Donna Summer; Michael Omartian
- Producer: Michael Omartian

Donna Summer singles chronology
"She Works Hard for the Money" (1983)	"Unconditional Love" (1983)	"People, People" (1983)

"Unconditional Love" is the second single from Donna Summer's eleventh studio album, She Works Hard for the Money (1983). The song was released in August 1983 by Mercury Records. It was written by Summer and Michael Omartian, produced by Omartian. Though uncredited, it also features vocals by British reggae band Musical Youth, who had scored a Top 10 pop and R&B hit in the US with "Pass the Dutchie" earlier in 1983.

The song peaked at #43 on the Billboard Hot 100 and #40 on the Cashbox chart, though it performed significantly better on the R&B chart (reaching the Top Ten). In the UK, it became Summer's fourteenth Top 20 single, reaching a peak position of No.14. The song also peaked at #26 on the Spanish radio chart, and at #95 in France.

Cashbox called the "purity and innocence" of the song "a bright departure [for Summer] and complete success."

The song was edited from the original album version for its release on the 7" single format. The 12" single featured an extended remix clocking in at 5:20.

== Music video ==
The music video for "Unconditional Love" was Summer's second music video to air on MTV, spending two weeks in heavy rotation. In the video, Summer plays a school teacher, and the reggae group Musical Youth are members of the class. After the class is over, Summer removes her heavy fur coat, revealing a tight blue glittery nightclub singer outfit, and goes outside, singing with all the students in the school. The local school who were invited to be a part of the Music video was King Athelstan Primary School and the school the filming took place was the Bonner Hill Road Girls School before it was demolished.

== Track listing ==
A. "Unconditional Love" (Club Mix) – 5:20
B. "She Works Hard for the Money" (Club Mix) – 6:00

A. "Unconditional Love" (Club Mix) – 5:20
B. "Unconditional Love" (Instrumental) – 4:40

== In popular culture ==
- In 2018, the song was included in the Broadway jukebox musical Summer: The Donna Summer Musical.

== Cover versions ==
In 1986, Christian punk band Altar Boys recorded a cover version of "Unconditional Love" on their studio album Gut Level Music.
