= Grammy Award for Best Disco Recording =

Award presented at the 22nd Grammy Awards in 1980

- Awarded for: Quality disco recordings
- Country: United States
- Presented by: National Academy of Recording Arts and Sciences
- First award: 1980; 46 years ago
- Final award: 1980; 46 years ago
- Website: grammy.com

The Grammy Award for Best Disco Recording was an award presented at the 22nd Grammy Awards in 1980. The Grammy Awards, an annual ceremony that was established in 1958 and originally called the Gramophone Awards, are presented by the National Academy of Recording Arts and Sciences of the United States to "honor artistic achievement, technical proficiency and overall excellence in the recording industry, without regard to album sales or chart position".

Gloria Gaynor and producers Dino Fekaris and Freddie Perren won the Best Disco Recording award for the song "I Will Survive". However, because of a backlash against disco, the Academy discontinued the category before the 23rd Grammy Awards. In 1998, a similar category, Best Dance Recording, began being awarded to honor vocal or instrumental dance tracks, though there were concerns that the genre would be short-lived much like the disco category.

== Background ==
Disco is a genre of dance music that emerged in the United States during the 1970s. The experimental mixing of records, combined with the newly acquired ability to play longer tracks, resulted in a genre well-suited for dance parties. During 1973–74, MFSB's "Love Is the Message" displayed "early rumblings of the disco sound", and shortly afterward the songs "Never Can Say Goodbye" by Gloria Gaynor, "The Hustle" by Van McCoy, and "Love to Love You Baby" by Donna Summer emerged. In 1977, the opening of Studio 54 in Manhattan, and the success of the disco-focused feature film Saturday Night Fever (which featured John Travolta and music by the Bee Gees), added to the popularity of the disco genre.

The following year, Paradise Garage opened in Manhattan's West Village, the New York radio station WKTU became "all-disco", and the number of discothèques in the nation reached nearly 20,000. At the 21st Grammy Awards in 1979, Saturday Night Fever: The Original Movie Sound Track, was named Album of the Year and the Bee Gees received the award for Best Pop Vocal Performance by a Duo or Group for their contributions to the soundtrack album. By the end of 1979, the disco industry was estimated to be worth more than $4 billion, "more ... than the industries of movies, television or professional sport".

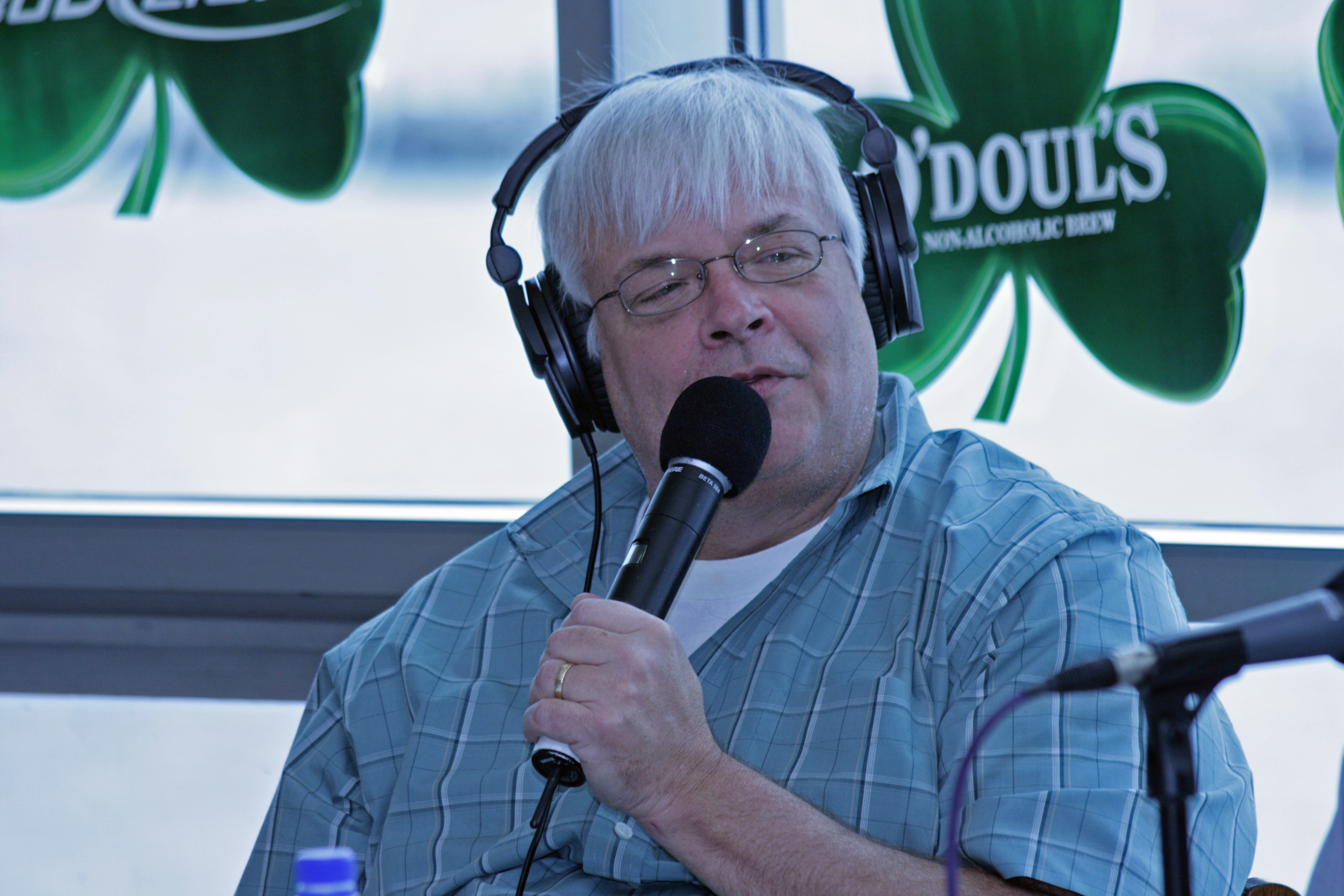
DJ and Disco Demolition Night leader Steve Dahl in 2008

However, the disco fad soon began to decline. On July 12, 1979, just a few months after Newsweek had reported on the "[take] over" of disco music, a "tongue-in-cheek" promotional event known as Disco Demolition Night was held at Chicago's Comiskey Park baseball stadium. During a doubleheader intermission, disc jockey Steve Dahl set ablaze a bin full of disco records, causing a riot within the stadium and gaining international attention. Approximately 10,000 disco records were destroyed, and around 50,000 rioters participated in the event, staying on the field, forcing the Chicago White Sox to forfeit the second game.

Nationally, a "backlash" took hold, as public support for disco music faded. According to author Craig Werner, as quoted in the British newspaper The Independent, the "anti-disco movement represented an unholy alliance of funkateers and feminists, progressives and puritans, rockers and reactionaries. None the less, the attacks on disco gave respectable voice to the ugliest kinds of unacknowledged racism, sexism and homophobia." By 1980 "mainstream disco" had ended, by 1985 WKTU had returned to playing rock music, and by the end of the decade the famous dance venues Studio 54, Paradise Garage, and Clubhouse had all closed.

== Award ==
Year^{[I]}	Artist(s)	Work	Production team
1980
1980	Gloria Gaynor	"I Will Survive"	Dino Ferakis and Freddie Perren, producers
1980	Earth, Wind & Fire	"Boogie Wonderland"	Al McKay and Maurice White, producers
1980	Michael Jackson	"Don't Stop 'Til You Get Enough"	Quincy Jones and Michael Jackson, producers
1980	Rod Stewart	"Da Ya Think I'm Sexy?"	Tom Dowd, producer
1980	Donna Summer	"Bad Girls"	Giorgio Moroder and Pete Bellotte, producers

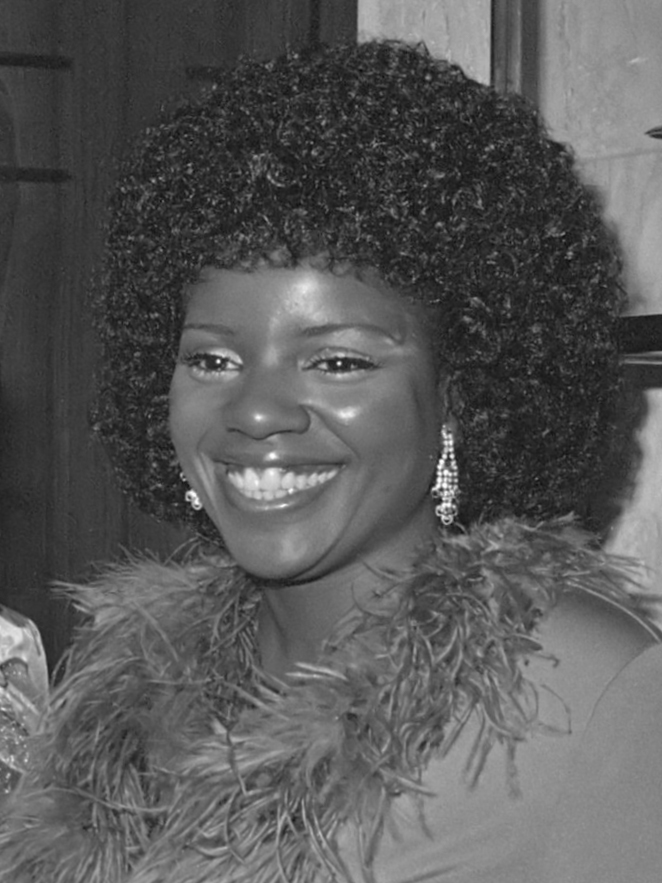
1980 award winner Gloria Gaynor, in 1976

In 1979, the National Academy of Recording Arts and Sciences decided to add a Best Disco Recording category for the 22nd Grammy Awards, just as disco was "preparing to die". Nominated works for the award included "Boogie Wonderland" by Earth, Wind & Fire, "I Will Survive" by Gloria Gaynor, "Don't Stop 'Til You Get Enough" by Michael Jackson, "Da Ya Think I'm Sexy?" by Rod Stewart, and "Bad Girls" by Donna Summer. On February 27, 1980, during a live telecast from Shrine Auditorium in Los Angeles, Gaynor was presented the award for Best Disco Recording. Dino Fekaris and Freddie Perren also received awards as the producers of the track.

However, because of the decreasing popularity of disco, the Academy eliminated the award category before the 1981 ceremony was to be held. According to the organization, disco was "no longer a readily definable separate music form", although its influence had "permeated all types of pop music". Despite the award's short span, the award helped solidify Gaynor as one of the best-known female disco artists from the 1970s and the song "I Will Survive" as one of the most recognized and top-selling songs from the genre.

Another dance category did not emerge until 1998 when the Grammy Award for Best Dance Recording began to honor vocal or instrumental dance tracks, though there were concerns that the award would be short-lived much like the disco category. In 2003, the Academy moved the category from the "Pop" field into a new "Dance" field, which currently contains the category Best Dance/Electronic Album as well.
