= 22nd Annual Grammy Awards =

1980 US music awards ceremony

- Date: February 27, 1980
- Location: Shrine Auditorium, Los Angeles
- Hosted by: Kenny Rogers
- Most awards: Kenny Rogers (5)
- Most nominations: Kenny Rogers (6)

Television/radio coverage
- Network: CBS

The 22nd Annual Grammy Awards were held on February 27, 1980, at Shrine Auditorium, Los Angeles, and were broadcast live on American television. They recognized accomplishments by musicians from the year 1979. This year was notable for being the first year to have a designated category for Rock music.

Album of the Year went to Phil Ramone and Billy Joel for 52nd Street, and Song of the Year went to Kenny Loggins and Michael McDonald for "What a Fool Believes".

== Presenters ==
- Debbie Harry & George Burns - Best New Artist
- Johnny Cash & June Carter Cash - Best Country Vocal Performance Female and Best Country Vocal Performance by a Duo or Group
- Kris Kristofferson & Herb Alpert - Record of the Year
- Ted Nugent & Debby Boone - Best Male Rock Performance
- Natalie Cole - Best Male Pop Vocal Performance
- Isaac Hayes - Best R&B Duo/Group

== Performers ==
- Barbra Streisand & Neil Diamond - "You Don't Bring Me Flowers"
- Bob Dylan - "Gotta Serve Somebody"
- Dionne Warwick - "I'll Never Love This Way Again"
- The Charlie Daniels Band - "The Devil Went Down to Georgia"
- Sarah Vaughan & Joe Williams - "The Face I Love"/"When You're Smiling"
- Sister Sledge - "We Are Family"
- The Doobie Brothers - "What a Fool Believes"
- Donna Summer & Kenny Rogers - "Song of the Year Medley"

== Winners ==
Record of the Year

- "What a Fool Believes"—The Doobie Brothers
  - Ted Templeman (producer)
- "After the Love Has Gone"―Earth, Wind & Fire
  - Maurice White (producer)
- "I Will Survive"—Gloria Gaynor
  - Dino Fekaris & Freddie Perren
- "The Gambler"—Kenny Rogers
  - Larry Butler (producer)
- "You Don't Bring Me Flowers"—Barbra Streisand & Neil Diamond
  - Bob Gaudio (producer)

Album of the Year

- 52nd Street—Billy Joel
  - Phil Ramone (producer)
- Minute by Minute—The Doobie Brothers
  - Ted Templeman (producer)
- The Gambler—Kenny Rogers
  - Larry Butler (producer)
- Bad Girls—Donna Summer
  - Giorgio Moroder & Pete Bellotte (producers)
- Breakfast in America—Supertramp
  - Peter Henderson & Supertramp (producers)

Song of the Year

- "What a Fool Believes"—The Doobie Brothers
  - Kenny Loggins & Michael McDonald (songwriters)
- "After the Love Has Gone"—Earth, Wind & Fire
  - David Foster, Jay Graydon & Bill Champlin (songwriters)
- "Chuck E.'s in Love"—Rickie Lee Jones
  - Rickie Lee Jones (songwriter)
- "Honesty"—Billy Joel
  - Billy Joel (songwriter)
- "I Will Survive"—Gloria Gaynor
  - Dino Fekaris & Freddie Perren (songwriters)
- "Minute by Minute"—The Doobie Brothers
  - Lester Abrams & Michael McDonald (songwriters)
- "Reunited"—Peaches & Herb
  - Dino Fekaris & Freddie Perren (songwriters)
- "She Believes in Me"—Kenny Rogers
  - Steve Gibb (songwriter)

Best New Artist

- Rickie Lee Jones
- The Blues Brothers
- Dire Straits
- The Knack
- Robin Williams

=== Children's ===
- Best Recording for Children
  - Jim Henson & Paul Williams (producers) for The Muppet Movie performed by The Muppets

=== Classical ===
- Best Classical Orchestral Recording
  - James Mallinson (producer), Georg Solti (conductor) & the Chicago Symphony Orchestra for Brahms: Symphonies (1-4)
- Best Classical Vocal Soloist Performance
  - Luciano Pavarotti & the Bologna Orchestra for O Sole Mio - Favorite Neapolitan Songs
- Best Opera Recording
  - Vittorio Negri (producer), Colin Davis (conductor), Heather Harper, Jonathan Summers, Jon Vickers & the Royal Opera House Orchestra for Britten: Peter Grimes
- Best Choral Performance, Classical (other than opera)
  - Georg Solti (conductor), Margaret Hillis (choir director), & the Chicago Symphony Orchestra & Chorus for Brahms: A German Requiem
- Best Classical Performance - Instrumental Soloist or Soloists (with orchestra)
  - Claudio Abbado (conductor), Maurizio Pollini & the Chicago Symphony Orchestra for Bartók: Piano Cons. Nos. 1 & 2
- Best Classical Performance - Instrumental Soloist or Soloists (without orchestra)
  - Vladimir Horowitz for The Horowitz Concerts 1978/79
- Best Chamber Music Performance
  - Dennis Russell Davies (conductor) & the St. Paul Chamber Orchestra for Copland: Appalachian Spring
- Best Classical Album
  - James Mallinson (producer), Georg Solti (conductor) & the Chicago Symphony Orchestra for Brahms: Symphonies (1-4)

=== Comedy ===
Best Comedy Recording

- "Reality...What a Concept"-Robin Williams

=== Composing and arranging ===
Best Instrumental Composition

- Superman Main Title Theme
  - John Williams (composer)

Best Album of Original Score Written for a Motion Picture or a Television Special

- "Superman"
  - John Williams (composer)

Best Instrumental Arrangement

- '"Soulful Strut"'
  - Claus Ogerman (arranger) (George Benson)

Best Arrangement Accompanying Vocals

- '"What a Fool Believes"'
  - Michael McDonald (arranger) (The Doobie Brothers)

=== Country ===
Best Country Vocal Performance, Female

- "Blue Kentucky Girl"-Emmylou Harris

Best Country Vocal Performance, Male

- "The Gambler"-Kenny Rogers

Best Country Vocal Performance by a Duo or Group

- "The Devil Went Down to Georgia"-The Charlie Daniels Band

Best Country Instrumental Performance

- "Big Sandy/Leather Britches"-Doc Watson & Merle Watson

Best Country Song

- "You Decorated My Life"-Kenny Rogers
  - Debbie Hupp & Bob Morrison songwriters

=== Disco ===
The award for Best Disco Recording was first given out at the 1980 Grammy Awards; however, this was the only year it was ever presented.

Best Disco Recording

- '"I Will Survive"-Gloria Gaynor
  - Dino Fekaris & Freddie Perren (producers)

=== Folk ===
- Best Ethnic or Traditional Recording
  - Muddy Waters for Muddy "Mississippi" Waters Live

=== Gospel ===
- Best Gospel Performance, Traditional
  - Blackwood Brothers for Lift Up the Name of Jesus
- Best Gospel Performance, Contemporary
  - The Imperials for Heed the Call
- Best Soul Gospel Performance, Traditional
  - Mighty Clouds of Joy for Changing Times
- Best Soul Gospel Performance, Contemporary
  - Andrae Crouch for I'll Be Thinking of You
- Best Inspirational Performance
  - B. J. Thomas for You Gave Me Love (When Nobody Gave Me a Prayer)

=== Historical ===
- Best Historical Reissue
  - Michael Brooks & Jerry Korn (producers) for Billie Holiday - Giants of Jazz

=== Jazz ===
- Best Jazz Instrumental Performance, Soloist
  - Oscar Peterson for Jousts
- Best Jazz Instrumental Performance, Group
  - Chick Corea & Gary Burton for Duet
- Best Jazz Instrumental Performance, Big Band
  - Duke Ellington for Duke Ellington at Fargo, 1940 Live
- Best Jazz Fusion Performance, Vocal or Instrumental
  - Weather Report for 8:30
- Best Jazz Vocal Performance
  - Ella Fitzgerald for Fine and Mellow

=== Latin ===
- Best Latin Recording
  - Irakere for Irakere

=== Musical show ===
- Best Cast Show Album
  - Stephen Sondheim (composer & lyricist), Thomas Z. Shepard (producer) & the original cast with Angela Lansbury & Len Cariou for Sweeney Todd

=== Packaging and notes ===
- Best Album Package
  - Mick Haggerty & Mike Doud (art directors) for Breakfast in America performed by Supertramp
- Best Album Notes
  - Bob Porter & James Patrick (notes writers) for Charlie Parker - The Complete Savoy Sessions performed by Charlie Parker

=== Pop ===
Best Pop Vocal Performance, Female

- "I'll Never Love This Way Again"—Dionne Warwick
- "I Will Survive"—Gloria Gaynor
- "Chuck E.'s in Love"—Rickie Lee Jones
- "Don't Cry Out Loud"—Melissa Manchester
- "Bad Girls"—Donna Summer

Best Pop Vocal Performance, Male

- "52nd Street"—Billy Joel
- "Sad Eyes"—Robert John
- "She Believes in Me"—Kenny Rogers
- "Da Ya Think I'm Sexy?"—Rod Stewart
- "Up on the Roof"—James Taylor

Best Pop Vocal Performance by a Duo, Group or Chorus

- "Minute by Minute"—The Doobie Brothers
- "Sail On"—The Commodores
- "Lonesome Loser"—Little River Band
- "You Don't Bring Me Flowers"—Barbra Streisand & Neil Diamond
- "Breakfast in America"—Supertramp

Best Pop Instrumental Performance

- "Rise"—Herb Alpert

=== Production and engineering ===
- Best Engineered Recording, Non-Classical
  - Peter Henderson (engineer): Breakfast in America (Supertramp)
- Best Engineered Recording, Classical
  - Anthony Salvatore (engineer) & the original cast with Angela Lansbury & Len Cariou for Sondheim: Sweeney Todd
- Producer of the Year
  - Larry Butler
- Classical Producer of the Year
  - James Mallinson

=== R&B ===
Best R&B Vocal Performance, Female

- "Deja Vu"—Dionne Warwick

Best R&B Vocal Performance, Male

- "Don't Stop 'Til You Get Enough"—Michael Jackson

Best R&B Vocal Performance by a Duo, Group or Chorus

- "After the Love Has Gone"—Earth, Wind & Fire

Best R&B Instrumental Performance

- "Boogie Wonderland"—Earth, Wind & Fire

Best R&B Song

- "After the Love Has Gone"—Earth, Wind & Fire
  - Bill Champlin, David Foster & Jay Graydon (songwriters)

=== Rock ===
Best Rock Vocal Performance, Female

- Hot Stuff—Donna Summer

Best Rock Vocal Performance, Male

- Gotta Serve Somebody—Bob Dylan

Best Rock Vocal Performance by a Duo or Group

- Heartache Tonight—The Eagles

Best Rock Instrumental Performance

- Rockestra Theme—Paul McCartney & Wings

=== Spoken ===
- Best Spoken Word, Documentary or Drama Recording
  - John Gielgud for Ages of Man—Readings From Shakespeare
