= Bad Girls (Donna Summer album) =

Studio album by Donna Summer
- Released: April 25, 1979
- Recorded: December 1978 – March 1979
- Studios: Rusk Sound (Los Angeles, California)
- Genres: Disco; rock; pop; hi-NRG; R&B; soul
- Length: 71:28
- Label: Casablanca
- Producers: Giorgio Moroder; Pete Bellotte

Donna Summer chronology
Live and More (1978)	Bad Girls (1979)	On the Radio: Greatest Hits Volumes I & II (1979)

Singles from Bad Girls
- 1. "Hot Stuff" Released: April 13, 1979; 2. "Bad Girls" Released: June 23, 1979; 3. "Dim All the Lights" Released: October 5, 1979; 4. "Sunset People" Released: July 11, 1980; 5. "Our Love" Released: August 22, 1980; 6. "Walk Away" Released: September 1, 1980

Bad Girls is the seventh studio album by American singer-songwriter Donna Summer, released on April 25, 1979, by Casablanca Records. Originally issued as a double album, Bad Girls became the best-selling and most critically acclaimed album of Summer's career (before the release of On the Radio: Greatest Hits Volumes I & II). It was also her final studio album for Casablanca Records. In 2003, Universal Music re-issued Bad Girls as a digitally remastered and expanded deluxe edition.

Bad Girls was a critical success, and reached the top of the US Billboard 200, where it stayed for six non-consecutive weeks. It also topped the Billboard R&B Albums chart for three weeks, from June 23 to July 7, 1979, and all cuts from the album topped the Disco Top 80 for seven weeks. It contained the US Billboard Hot 100 number-one hits "Hot Stuff" and "Bad Girls", and the number-two hit "Dim All the Lights". Summer also became the first female artist to have two songs in the top three of the Billboard Hot 100 when during the week of June 30, 1979, "Hot Stuff" fell to number two and "Bad Girls" rose to number three.

Bad Girls was certified platinum — now double platinum — by the Recording Industry Association of America (RIAA) within a week of its release. At the 1980 Grammy Awards, the album received five nominations, including Album of the Year; "Hot Stuff" won the inaugural Best Female Rock Vocal Performance. Bad Girls is considered one of the best albums of the 1970s and amongst the greatest disco albums of all time. In 2020, it was ranked at 283 on Rolling Stone's 500 Greatest Albums of All Time list.

== Background ==
Having made her name in the preceding years as "the queen of disco," Summer set to work on her new album with long-time partners Giorgio Moroder and Pete Bellotte, as well as various others she had not worked with before. By this time, although disco music was still popular, other styles such as punk and heavy metal were also doing well on the charts, so the team decided to incorporate a rockier sound into some of the songs. Other songs had a more soul/R&B feel to them, and in all it was probably Summer's most diverse album to date. The fusion of rock and disco was particularly evident, and synthesizers were used to augment the sound for a more electronic and dance oriented electro music in the first two songs on the album – "Hot Stuff" and "Bad Girls", which also became the first two singles to be released from the album. Both were huge hits and made number one on the American singles chart. The former also won Summer a Grammy Award for Best Female Rock Vocal Performance and became popular again in the 1990s when it was featured in The Full Monty and again in the film The Martian. "Dim All the Lights" was the third single and also became a huge hit, peaking at number two in the U.S.

== Release and reception ==
Professional ratings
Review scores
Source	Rating
AllMusic	4.5/5 stars
Christgau's Record Guide	A−
PopMatters	favorable
Q	4/5 stars
Rolling Stone	favorable (1979)
Rolling Stone	(2003)
The Virgin Encyclopedia of Popular Music	4/5 stars
Yahoo! Music	favorable

Bad Girls was universally acclaimed by music reviews. As well as the winner of the aforementioned Grammy Award for "Hot Stuff" (Best Female Rock Vocal Performance), the song "Bad Girls" was also nominated for Best Disco Recording, "Dim All the Lights" was nominated for Best Female R&B Vocal Performance and the album itself was nominated for Album of the Year and Best Female Pop Vocal Performance. At the American Music Awards of 1980, the album was nominated for Favorite Pop/Rock Album. The single won an American Music Award for Favorite Pop/Rock Single, while Summer took awards for Favorite Pop/Rock Female Artist and Favorite Soul/R&B Female Artist.

Bad Girls would be Summer's final studio album for Casablanca Records, who ended 1979 with the release of a greatest hits double-album. For her next studio album, Summer wanted to branch out into other formats of music but since she and Casablanca could not come to an agreement on her musical direction, Summer opted to sign a new deal with Geffen Records, the then-new label formed by David Geffen. Her first album with Geffen Records was more rock/new wave oriented. In the meantime, Casablanca chose to release more singles from the Bad Girls album into 1980: "Sunset People" and "Walk Away", the latter of which became a moderate hit reaching the top 40. Casablanca/PolyGram also released a special edition compilation entitled Walk Away – Greatest Hits 1977–1980, which featured a selection of her hits from the Bad Girls period and the preceding years. In 2003 Universal Music, owners of the Casablanca/PolyGram back catalogue since 1998, re-issued Bad Girls as a digitally remastered and expanded deluxe edition.

Bad Girls was ranked by Rolling Stone's list of the Women Who Rock: The 50 Greatest Albums of All Time at number 23. The magazine wrote, "The late great Queen of Disco pulls out all the stops for an album that sums up Seventies radio, from ladies-choice smooch jams to filthy funk." In 2020, the album was ranked at 283 on Rolling Stone's 500 Greatest Albums of All Time list. In a BBC Music review of the album, Daryl Easla wrote, "Bad Girls is a fantastic reminder of when [Summer] was the Britney, Christina, Mary J and Missy of her day all rolled into one." Part of the song "Our Love", also available as a B-side, was copied by New Order on "Blue Monday".

== Commercial performance ==
The album was certified double platinum for sales in excess of 2 million copies in the U.S. on December 1, 1993 (double albums are certified per disc by the RIAA rather than per complete unit). It also became her second consecutive number-one album in the U.S., also spending three weeks at number one in Canada on the RPM 100 national albums chart. It has sold over 4 million copies worldwide.

== Track listing ==
All tracks produced by Giorgio Moroder and Pete Bellotte except "My Baby Understands" by Donna Summer and Juergen Koppers.

Side one
No.	Title	Writer(s)	Length
1.	"Hot Stuff"	Bellotte; Harold Faltermeyer; Keith Forsey	5:14
2.	"Bad Girls"	Donna Summer; Bruce Sudano; Joe "Bean" Esposito; Edward "Eddie" Hokenson	4:55
3.	"Love Will Always Find You"	Bellotte; Moroder	3:59
4.	"Walk Away"	Bellotte; Faltermeyer	4:27
Total length:			18:35

Side two
No.	Title	Writer(s)	Length
1.	"Dim All the Lights"	Summer	4:40
2.	"Journey to the Center of Your Heart"	Bellotte; Moroder	4:36
3.	"One Night in a Lifetime"	Bellotte; Faltermeyer	4:12
4.	"Can't Get to Sleep at Night"	Bob Conti; Sudano	4:45
Total length:			18:13

Side three
No.	Title	Writer(s)	Length
1.	"On My Honor"	Summer; Faltermeyer; Bruce Sudano	3:34
2.	"There Will Always Be a You"	Summer	5:07
3.	"All Through the Night"	Summer; Bruce Roberts	6:01
4.	"My Baby Understands"	Summer	4:03
Total length:			18:45

Side four
No.	Title	Writer(s)	Length
1.	"Our Love"	Summer; Moroder	4:51
2.	"Lucky"	Summer; Moroder; Esposito; Hokenson; Sudano	4:37
3.	"Sunset People"	Bellotte; Faltermeyer; Forsey	6:27
Total length:			15:55

Deluxe edition — Disc 1 (bonus track)
No.	Title	Producer(s)	Length
16.	"Bad Girls" (demo version)	Summer	4:00
Total length:			75:28

Deluxe edition — Disc 2: 12" Singles & More
No.	Title	Writer(s)	Producer(s)	Length
1.	"I Feel Love" (12" single)	Bellotte; Moroder; Summer		8:12
2.	"Last Dance" (12" single, from the soundtrack Thank God It's Friday)	Paul Jabara		8:11
3.	"MacArthur Park Suite" ("MacArthur Park"/"One of a Kind"/"Heaven Knows"/"MacArthur Park (Reprise)")	Bellotte; Moroder; Summer; Jimmy Webb		17:35
4.	"Hot Stuff" (12" single)	Bellotte; Faltermeyer; Forsey		6:47
5.	"Bad Girls" (12" single)	Summer; Esposito; Hokenson; Sudano		4:57
6.	"Walk Away" (12" single)	Bellotte; Faltermeyer		7:16
7.	"Dim All the Lights" (12" single)	Summer		7:14
8.	"No More Tears (Enough Is Enough)" (duet with Barbra Streisand)	Roberts; Jabara	Gary Klein	11:44
9.	"On the Radio" (long version; from the original soundtrack Foxes)	Moroder; Summer	Moroder	7:35
Total length:				79:31

== Personnel ==
=== Musicians ===
- Donna Summer – lead and background vocals, composition, production
- Giorgio Moroder – bass guitar, synthesizer, guitar, composition, production
- Pete Bellotte – bass guitar, composition, production
- Harold Faltermeyer – bass guitar, composition, drums, keyboards, synclavier
- Bruce Sudano – synthesizer, composition
- Joe Esposito – background vocals, composition
- Keith Forsey – background vocals, drums, percussion, composition
- Jeff Baxter – guitar (solo on "Hot Stuff"), prototype Roland guitar synthesiser (solo on "Bad Girls")
- Bob Conti – percussion, composition
- Edward "Eddie" Hokenson – composition
- Pamela Quinlan – background vocals
- Jai Winding – piano
- Jay Graydon, Paul Jackson Jr. Keb' Mo – guitar
- Al Perkins – steel guitar
- Sid Sharp – strings
- Scott Edwards, Scott Lipsker, Bob Glaub – bass guitar
- Gary Grant, Jerry Hey, Steve Madaio – trumpet
- Gary Herbig – saxophone
- Dick Hyde, Bill Reichenbach Jr. – trombone
- Stephanie Spruill, Julia and Maxine Waters – backing vocals

=== Production ===
- Producers: Giorgio Moroder, Pete Bellotte
- Arranged by: Harold Faltermeyer
- Recording Engineer: Jürgen Koppers, Steven D. Smith
- Assistant Engineer: Carolyn Tapp
- Mixing Engineer: Jürgen Koppers
- Original Mastering Engineer: Brian Gardner at Allen Zentz Mastering, Hollywood
  - recorded and mixed at Rusk Sound studios, Hollywood; January – March 1979
- Production manager: Budd Tunick
- Art direction: Jeffrey Kent Ayeroff
- Design: Jeffrey Kent Ayeroff, Jeri McManus
- Photography: Harry Langdon Jr.

== Charts ==
=== Weekly charts ===
Chart (1979)	Peak position
Australian Albums (Kent Music Report)	6
Austrian Albums (Ö3 Austria)	8
Canada Top Albums/CDs (RPM)	1
Dutch Albums (Album Top 100)	24
Finnish Albums (Suomen virallinen lista)	1
French Albums (SNEP)	9
German Albums (Offizielle Top 100)	7
Italian Albums (Musica e dischi)	3
Japanese Albums (Oricon)	9
New Zealand Albums (RMNZ)	3
Norwegian Albums (VG-lista)	3
Spanish Albums (Promusicae)	6
Swedish Albums (Sverigetopplistan)	3
UK Albums (Official Charts)	23
US Billboard 200	1
US Dance Club Songs (Billboard)	1
US Top R&B/Hip-Hop Albums (Billboard)	1

=== Year-end charts ===
Chart (1979)	Position
Australian Albums (Kent Music Report)	21
Canada Top Albums/CDs (RPM)	9
Dutch Albums (Album Top 100)	77
German Albums (Offizielle Top 100)	26
New Zealand Albums (RMNZ)	30
US Billboard 200	8
US Top R&B/Hip-Hop Albums (Billboard)	7

== Certifications and sales ==
Region	Certification	Certified units/sales
Canada (Music Canada)	2× Platinum	200,000^{^}
France	—	200,000
Germany	—	250,000
Greece (IFPI Greece)	Gold	50,000^{^}
New Zealand (RMNZ)	Gold	7,500^{^}
United Kingdom (BPI)	Silver	60,000^{^}
United States (RIAA)	2× Platinum	2,000,000^{^}
Summaries
Worldwide	—	4,000,000
^{^} Shipments figures based on certification alone.

== See also ==
- List of number-one albums of 1979 (U.S.)
- List of number-one R&B albums of 1979 (U.S.)
