= Dim All the Lights =

1979 single by Donna Summer

- Dutch picture sleeve

Single by Donna Summer

from the album Bad Girls
- B-side: "There Will Always Be a You"
- Released: August 1979
- Recorded: 1979
- Genre: R&B; disco; soul
- Length: 4:40 (Album Version); 3:55 (7" Edit)
- Label: Casablanca
- Songwriter: Donna Summer
- Producers: Giorgio Moroder; Pete Bellotte

Donna Summer singles chronology
"Bad Girls" (1979)	"Dim All the Lights" (1979)	"No More Tears (Enough Is Enough)" (1979)

"Dim All the Lights" is a song by American recording artist Donna Summer released as the third single from her 1979 album Bad Girls. It debuted at number 70 on August 25, 1979, and peaked that year at number two on November 10 and November 17 on the Billboard Hot 100. Produced by her longtime collaborator Giorgio Moroder with Pete Bellotte, the track combines Summer's trademark disco beats with a more soulful pop sound. It was the third Hot 100 top-two single from the album and her sixth consecutive Hot 100 top-five single.

== Background ==
Prior to the release of "Dim All the Lights", Summer had released "Hot Stuff" and "Bad Girls" and, later, the "No More Tears (Enough Is Enough)" duet with Barbra Streisand, all of which reached number one on the Billboard Hot 100. "Dim All the Lights" also became another massive hit for her. Overseas, it peaked at number 29 on the UK Singles Chart. Like "Hot Stuff" and "Bad Girls" before, Summer's "Dim All the Lights" and "No More Tears" were simultaneously in the top three. Summer was the first female artist to achieve that feat.

"Dim All the Lights" was Summer's only hit single that she wrote alone. She had originally considered giving the song to Rod Stewart but changed her mind. The song was nominated for Best R&B Performance, Female at the 22nd Grammy Awards in 1980. The song caused a rift between Donna and Casablanca label president Neil Bogart, who had promised to wait a month longer than he did before releasing Summer's duet with Barbra Streisand, to allow "Dim" to peak first.

The recording is remarkable for Summer sustaining a note for 16 seconds. In comparison, Bill Withers set the overall record nearly two years earlier, sustaining a note for 18 seconds in "Lovely Day".

The record's flipside, "There Will Always Be a You," was also written alone by Summer. It also received some airplay and was charted as an album cut on some North American radio stations (notably CKLW in Windsor, Ontario, where it reached number two in October 1979; "Dim All the Lights" failed to chart prominently on that station).

== Reception ==
Billboard rated the song one of the sexiest ever recorded, saying it, "sounds like a nice song to sway to at the prom. But the groove becomes decidedly horizontal once the song hits the bridge and she demands her lover to 'use me all up / take me bottom to top'. Cash Box said the song was "original and intriguing," with a "surging disco beat." Record World said it "explodes into a joyous disco-pop dancer."

Smash Hits said it, "has a slow intro which breaks into the familiar beat while she holds a note for two hours. There's piano, echo, and lots of backing vocals."

== Official versions ==
- Album version – 4:40
- 7" version – 3:59
- 12" version – 7:09

== Charts ==
=== Weekly charts ===
Weekly chart performance for "Dim All the Lights"
Chart (1979–80)	Peak position
Belgium (Ultratop 50 Flanders)	28
Canada Top Singles (RPM)	13
Canada Dance/Urban (RPM)	4
Ireland (IRMA)	30
Netherlands (Tipparade)	4
Netherlands (Single Top 100)	28
New Zealand (Recorded Music NZ)	14
UK Singles (Official Charts)	29
US Billboard Hot 100	2
US Adult Contemporary (Billboard)	44
US Dance Club Songs (Billboard)	54
US Hot R&B/Hip-Hop Songs (Billboard)	13
US Cash Box Top 100	3
West Germany (GfK)	25

=== Year-end charts ===
1979 year-end chart performance for "Dim All the Lights"
Chart (1979)	Position
Canada Top Singles (RPM)	94
US Cash Box Top 100	45

1980 year-end chart performance for "Dim All the Lights"
Chart (1980)	Position
US Billboard Hot 100	74

== Certifications and sales ==
Certifications for "Dim All the Lights"
Region	Certification	Certified units/sales
United States (RIAA)	Gold	1,000,000^{^}
^{^} Shipments figures based on certification alone.

== Laura Branigan version ==
"Dim All the Lights"
- Artwork for the US commercial cassette

Single by Laura Branigan

from the album The Best of Branigan
- B-side: "Show Me Heaven"
- Released: 1995
- Genre: Pop; Eurodisco
- Length: 4:44
- Label: Atlantic
- Songwriter: Donna Summer
- Producer: Brinsley Evans

Laura Branigan singles chronology
"How Can I Help You to Say Goodbye" (1994)	"Dim All the Lights" (1995)	"I Believe" (1995)

Laura Branigan had a Top 40 Dance hit in 1995 with her cover version. The single version appears on her US hits collection, The Best of Branigan. While Branigan's version was released in several mixes by Atlantic Records, a popular version in some Hi-NRG clubs at the time came from the DJ-only label Hot Tracks, which gave clubgoers two singers in one song, editing Donna Summer's original in with Branigan's remake. A video for the single, showing Branigan surrounded by a bevy of drag queens (Miss Understood, Hedda Lettuce and Vivacious), was her last, and the release was the end of her association with the label, as she left the music industry to care for her husband, who had been diagnosed with cancer.

=== Track listing ===
US cassette single
No.	Title	Length
1.	"Dim All the Lights"	4:44
2.	"Dim All the Lights" ("remix edit" on the cassette; "Ehab's remix radio edit" on the promo CD)	4:14

German CD single – promo
No.	Title	Length
1.	"Dim All the Lights"	4:44
2.	"Show Me Heaven"	4:09

12" single – The Stonebridge Mixes
No.	Title	Length
1.	"Dim All the Lights" (Stonebridge main mix)	6:39
2.	"Dim All the Lights" (Monday bar dub)	6:43
3.	"Dim All the Lights" (Stonebridge straight mix)	5:52
4.	"Dim All the Lights" (Stonebridge edit)	3:26
5.	"Dim All the Lights" (Ehab's Rehab edit)	4:14

12" single – promo
No.	Title	Length
1.	"Dim All the Lights" (Ehab's Rehab club version)	5:52
2.	"Dim All the Lights" (Ehab's Rehab edit)	4:14
3.	"Dim All the Lights"	4:44
4.	"Dim All the Lights" (instrumental)	4:44

=== Charts ===
Chart (1995)	Peak position
US Dance Singles Sales (Billboard)	37
Hungarian Airplay Charts	12
