= Bad Girls (Donna Summer song) =

1979 single by Donna Summer

- French picture sleeve

Single by Donna Summer

from the album Bad Girls
- B-side: "On My Honor"
- Released: June 23, 1979
- Recorded: 1979
- Studio: Rusk Sound Studios (Los Angeles, California)
- Genre: Disco; rock
- Length: 4:57 (album version); 3:55 (single version)
- Label: Casablanca
- Songwriters: Donna Summer; Bruce Sudano; Joe "Bean" Esposito; Edward "Eddie" Hokenson
- Producers: Giorgio Moroder; Pete Bellotte

Donna Summer singles chronology
"Hot Stuff" (1979)	"Bad Girls" (1979)	"Dim All the Lights" (1979)

"Bad Girls" is a song by American singer and songwriter Donna Summer from her 1979 seventh studio album of the same name. Casablanca Records released it as the album's second single on June 23, 1979. The song was produced by Summer's regular collaborators Giorgio Moroder and Pete Bellotte, and co-written by Summer and the members of Brooklyn Dreams, Bruce Sudano, Joe "Bean" Esposito and Edward "Eddie" Hokenson.

"Bad Girls" was a massive success, peaking within the Top 10 of the charts in seven countries, including New Zealand and Spain. In the United States, it spent five weeks at number one on the Billboard Hot 100, from the weeks of July 14 to August 11, 1979, and sold over two million copies, simultaneously becoming, alongside "Hot Stuff", her most successful single. It helped the Bad Girls album to reach multi-platinum status in the United States.

== Background and recording ==
The inspiration for Summer to write "Bad Girls" came after one of her assistants was offended by a police officer who thought she was a prostitute. A rough version of the song had originally been written a couple of years before its release. Casablanca Records' founder Neil Bogart, upon hearing it, wanted Summer to give it to Cher. Summer refused and put it away for a couple of years.

A 12-inch version of "Bad Girls" was released as a medley with "Hot Stuff". Although "Hot Stuff" was extended for the release, "Bad Girls" remained in the original full-length album version. A demo version of "Bad Girls" was released on the deluxe edition of the Bad Girls album.

== Critical reception ==
Billboard magazine called "Bad Girls" a "brassy disco track, which features party sounding production embellishments like hems and whistles." Record World magazine said that Summer's "sultry reading is perfect for the threatening street theme."

== Commercial performance ==
For the week of June 23, 1979, Summer made history as the first female artist to send multiple songs to the top ten on the Billboard Hot 100 as "Bad Girls" vaulted up from number 11 to number 5 that week all while Summer's "Hot Stuff" remained number one.

Eventually, "Bad Girls" reached the top of the Hot 100 for the week of July 14, 1979, where it would stay for five weeks outperforming "Hot Stuff", which had topped the chart for three weeks.

== Awards and nominations ==
"Bad Girls" was nominated for Favorite Pop/Rock Single, and won for Favorite Pop/Rock Female Artist, at the American Music Awards of 1980. Summer was also nominated for the Grammy Award for Best Disco Recording at the 22nd Annual Grammy Awards.

== Charts ==
=== Weekly charts ===
Chart (1979)	Peak position
Australia (Kent Music Report)	14
Austria (Ö3 Austria Top 40)	23
Belgium (Ultratop 50 Flanders)	5
Canada Top Singles (CRIA)	2
Canada Top Singles (RPM)	1
Canada Dance/Urban (RPM)	1
Ecuador (Record World)	5
Finland (Suomen virallinen lista)	8
Ireland (IRMA)	23
Italy (Musica e dischi)	17
Netherlands (Dutch Top 40)	7
Netherlands (Single Top 100)	10
New Zealand (Recorded Music NZ)	6
Norway (VG-lista)	8
Spain (AFE)	21
Spain (Los 40)	8
Sweden (Sverigetopplistan)	13
Switzerland (Schweizer Hitparade)	5
UK Singles (Official Charts)	14
US Billboard Hot 100	1
US Dance Club Songs (Billboard)	1
US Hot R&B/Hip-Hop Songs (Billboard)	1
West Germany (GfK)	9

=== Year-end charts ===
Chart (1979)	Position
Belgium (Ultratop Flanders)	37
Canada Top Singles (RPM)	10
Netherlands (Dutch Top 40)	58
US Billboard Hot 100	2
US Hot R&B/Hip-Hop Songs (Billboard)	16

== Certifications and sales ==
Region	Certification	Certified units/sales
Canada (Music Canada)	Platinum	150,000^{^}
United Kingdom (BPI)	Silver	250,000^{^}
United States (RIAA)	Platinum	2,000,000^{^}
^{^} Shipments figures based on certification alone.
