= Last Dance (Donna Summer song) =

- Front sleeve of the French vinyl release

Single by Donna Summer

from the album Thank God It's Friday
- B-side: "With Your Love"
- Released: July 2, 1978
- Recorded: 1977
- Genre: Disco
- Length: 8:11; 3:21 (single edit); 3:17 (reprise)
- Label: Casablanca
- Songwriter: Paul Jabara
- Producers: Giorgio Moroder; Pete Bellotte

Donna Summer singles chronology
"Back in Love Again" (1978)	"Last Dance" (1978)	"Je t'aime... moi non plus" (1978)

Music video
- "Last Dance" on YouTube

"Last Dance" is a song by American singer-songwriter Donna Summer from the soundtrack to the 1978 film Thank God It's Friday. It was written by Paul Jabara, co-produced by Summer's regular collaborator Giorgio Moroder and Pete Bellotte, and mixed by Grammy Award-winning producer Stephen Short, whose backing vocals are featured in the song. "Last Dance" became a critical and commercial success, winning the Academy Award for Best Original Song at the 51st Academy Awards, Golden Globe Award for Best Original Song at the 36th Golden Globe Awards and the Grammy Award for Best Female R&B Vocal Performance at the 21st Annual Grammy Awards. The song peaked at number three on the US Billboard Hot 100 in 1978.

== Background and composition ==
Donna Summer had a role in the film Thank God It's Friday as Nicole Sims, an aspiring singer who brings an instrumental track of "Last Dance" to a disco in hopes the disc jockey Bobby Speed (Ray Vitte) will play the track and allow her to sing the song for her fellow patrons. After refusing through most of the film, Bobby eventually obliges Nicole and her performance causes a sensation.

According to the song's arranger Bob Esty, Paul Jabara had locked Summer in a Puerto Rico hotel bathroom and forced her to listen to a cassette of him singing a rough version of "Last Dance". Summer liked the song and Jabara asked Esty to work with him on an arrangement for Summer to make her recording. Esty recalls:

I changed some of the chords and extended the 'hook' to repeat three times to finish the last phrase of the chorus. I also added a bridge to build to a climax and suggested a ballad intro à la "Ain't No Mountain High Enough" and another ballad in the middle of the song building again to a high note for the last chorus ending. To our knowledge, this had never been done in a disco track. ..We did the piano/vocal with Donna and me of the full version including the two ballad sections and the ending in one 'pass'...I recorded the full track in one day, rhythm in the morning, horns and strings during the day. That same night, Giorgio Moroder recorded Donna's vocal exactly as she sang the demo, in two takes, and banning me from attending the session. In spite of the fact Giorgio didn't like the song and didn't want Donna to sing in a full voice style, I thought I would be at least credited for co-producing the track and co-writing the song with Paul. He ultimately took credit for it. And Paul Jabara took the Oscar. I learned a bitter lesson from that.

— Bob Esty

"Last Dance" was also one of the first disco songs to feature slow tempo parts: it starts off as a ballad; the full-length version on the film soundtrack also has a slow part in the middle. The middle part was edited out for the 7". Record World said of the single that "Its first half is a quiet ballad (which Summer sings well); it winds up with a hot, swirling disco finish." The versions found on most greatest hits packages is either the original 7" edit (3:21) or the slightly longer and remixed version from the 1979 compilation On The Radio: Greatest Hits Volumes 1 & 2 (4:56). "Last Dance" started a trend for Summer as some of her following hits also had a ballad-like intro before speeding up the tempo. On David Foster's The Hitman Returns DVD, Foster introduces the song by relating a story to Donna Summer. When he played on the session in 1978, Foster thought the producer's suggestion to start the song as a ballad and change into a faster tempo was "the stupidest idea I've ever heard in my life, but we did it."

== Commercial performance ==
“Last Dance” entered the Billboard Hot 100 at number 85 on May 13, 1978. On its fourth week, it entered the top 40. Six weeks later, on July 15, it entered the top ten. It reached its peak at number three on August 12, 1978, nearly matching the peak of "Love to Love You Baby". It would stay inside the top ten for seven weeks and would spend a cumulative total of 21 weeks altogether. The song would become the first of eight top five consecutive singles Summer would have on the Hot 100.

On the Hot Soul Singles chart, the song would peak at number five on July 22, 1978. On the National Disco Action chart, the song would peak at number one on June 3, 1978 and would stay there for six weeks, becoming her second longest running number one single on the chart and became the top selling disco hit of the year according to Billboard. In the UK, the song's success was more modest, reaching the lower regions of the top 75 at number 51, her lowest UK chart peak at the time.

== Awards and recognition ==
"Last Dance" won songwriter Paul Jabara a Grammy Award Best Rhythm & Blues Song at the 21st Annual Grammy Awards, an Academy Award for Best Original Song at the 51st Academy Awards, and a Golden Globe for Best Original Song at the 36th Golden Globe Awards that same year. The song won Donna Summer prizes for Favorite Disco Single and Favorite Female Disco Artist at the American Music Awards of 1979. She would also win the Grammy Award for Best R&B Vocal Performance, Female.

In 2000, VH1 ranked "Last Dance" number six in their list of "100 Greatest Dance Songs". In 2012, Rolling Stone ranked it number four in their list of "The Best Disco Songs of All Time". In 2016, the song was ranked number ten out of the top 76 songs of the 1970s by internet radio station WDDF Radio in their countdown. In 2022, Rolling Stone ranked "Last Dance" number 200 in their list of the "200 Greatest Dance Songs of All Time".

== Charts and certifications ==
=== Weekly charts ===
Chart (1978)	Peak position
Australia (Kent Music Report)	69
Canada (CRIA)	10
Canada Top Singles (RPM)	4
Netherlands (Dutch Top 40)	8
Netherlands (GfK)	10
New Zealand	3
Spain (PROMUSICAE)	25
Spain Radio (Los 40)	13
Sweden (Sverigetopplistan)	16
UK Singles (OCC)	51
US Billboard Hot 100	3
US Adult Contemporary (Billboard)	42
US Dance Club Songs (Billboard)	1
US Hot Soul Singles (Billboard)	5
US Cash Box Top 100	2

=== Year-end charts ===
Chart (1978)	Position
Canada (RPM)	18
New Zealand	24
US Billboard Hot 100	34
US Cash Box Top 100	39

=== Certifications ===
Region	Certification	Certified units/sales
New Zealand (RMNZ)	Gold	15,000^{‡}
United States (RIAA)	Gold	1,000,000^{^}
^{^} Shipments figures based on certification alone.^{‡} Sales+streaming figures based on certification alone.

== Appearances in other media ==
The song is frequently used by radio stations as their last song before changing formats, being used by many "Jammin' Oldies" stations in the US before the downfall of the format in the 2000s. It was used as the last song on the SiriusXM channel The Strobe in October 2010. On June 6, 2016 at 12 p.m., classic hits station KOSF in San Francisco, California played "Last Dance" before flipping from "Big 103.7" to 1980s hits as "iHeart 80s at 103.7".

== See also ==
- List of number-one dance singles of 1978 (U.S.)
