= List of awards and nominations received by Ariana DeBose =

Ariana DeBose awards and nominations
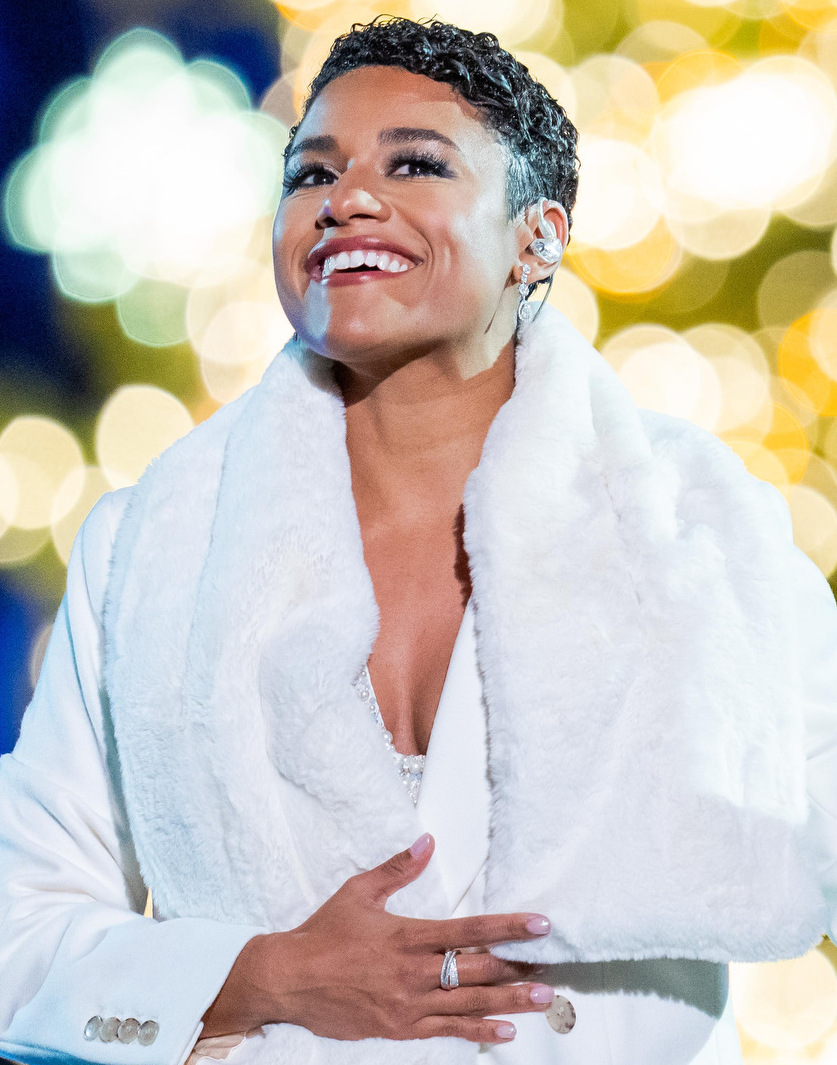
- DeBose in 2022
Awards and nominations
Award	Wins	Nominations
Academy Awards	1	1
Actor Awards	1	1
British Academy Film Awards	1	2
Critics' Choice Awards	1	2
Golden Globe Awards	1	1
Primetime Emmy Awards	0	2
Tony Awards	0	1

Totals (Note: Certain award groups do not simply award one winner. They acknowledge several different recipients, have runners-up, and have third place. Since this is a specific recognition and is different from losing an award, runner-up mentions are considered wins in this award tally. For simplification and to avoid errors, each award in this list has been presumed to have had a prior nomination.)
- Wins: 18
- Nominations: 40

Ariana DeBose is an American actress of the stage and screen who has received recognition and accolades for her varying performances; such as her portrayal of Donna Summer in the 2018 Broadway musical Summer: The Donna Summer Musical, for which she was nominated for the Tony Award for Best Featured Actress in a Musical; and as Anita in Steven Spielberg's 2021 film adaptation of West Side Story, winning the Academy Award (Oscar), BAFTA Award, Critics' Choice Award, Golden Globe Award and Screen Actors Guild Award for Best Supporting Actress. She has also received recognition for her performances in multiple stage plays and musicals; including Hairspray (2011), Bring It On: The Musical (2011–2012), Pippin (2014), Hamilton (2015) and A Bronx Tale (2016); films such as Hamilton and The Prom (both 2020); and television series such as the documentary Hamilton's America (2016) and the musical comedy series Schmigadoon! (2021–2023).

Her other achievements include finishing in the top 20 of the sixth season of So You Think You Can Dance in 2009 and earning a nomination for the BAFTA Rising Star Award in 2022 following her breakthrough role of Anita in 2021's West Side Story, a Spielberg rendition of the 1961 film and 1957 stage musical of the same name. Additionally, her 2022 Oscar win for West Side Story made her the first Afro-Latina and openly queer woman of color to receive an Oscar in an acting category.

== Major associations ==
=== Academy Awards ===
Year	Category	Work	Result	Ref.
2022	Best Supporting Actress	West Side Story	Won	

=== Actor Awards ===
Year	Category	Work	Result	Ref.
2022	Outstanding Performance by a Female Actor in a Supporting Role	West Side Story	Won	

=== BAFTA Awards ===
Year	Category	Work	Result	Ref.
British Academy Film Awards
2022	EE Rising Star Award		Nominated	
2022	Best Film Actress in a Supporting Role	West Side Story	Won	

=== Critics' Choice Movie Awards ===
Year	Category	Work	Result	Ref.
2022	Best Acting Ensemble	West Side Story	Nominated	
2022	Best Supporting Actress	West Side Story	Won	

=== Emmy Awards ===
Year	Category	Work	Result	Ref.
Primetime Emmy Awards
2023	Outstanding Variety Special (Live)	75th Tony Awards	Nominated	
2024	Outstanding Variety Special (Live)	76th Tony Awards	Nominated	

=== Golden Globe Awards ===
Year	Category	Work	Result	Ref.
2022	Best Supporting Actress – Motion Picture	West Side Story	Won	

=== Tony Awards ===
Year	Category	Work	Result	Ref.
2018	Best Featured Actress in a Musical	Summer: The Donna Summer Musical	Nominated	

== Theatre awards ==
=== Chita Rivera Awards ===
Year	Category	Nominated work	Result	Ref.
2016	Outstanding Ensemble in a Broadway Show	Hamilton	Nominated	
2018	Outstanding Female Dancer in a Broadway Show	Summer: The Donna Summer Musical	Won	

=== Drama League Awards ===
Year	Category	Nominated work	Result	Ref.
2018	Distinguished Performance Award	Summer: The Donna Summer Musical	Nominated	

== Critics awards ==
=== Alliance of Women Film Journalists Awards ===
Year	Category	Nominated work	Result	Ref.
2022	Best Woman's Breakthrough Performance	West Side Story	Nominated	

=== Austin Film Critics Association Awards ===
Year	Category	Nominated work	Result	Ref.
2022	Best Supporting Actress	West Side Story	Nominated	
2022	Breakthrough Artist Award		Nominated	

=== Chicago Film Critics Association Awards ===
Year	Category	Nominated work	Result	Ref.
2021	Best Supporting Actress	West Side Story	Nominated	
2021	Most Promising Performer		Nominated	

=== Detroit Film Critics Society Awards ===
Year	Category	Nominated work	Result	Ref.
2021	Best Supporting Actress	West Side Story	Won	

=== Florida Film Critics Circle Awards ===
Year	Category	Nominated work	Result	Ref.
2021	Best Supporting Actress	West Side Story	Won	

=== Georgia Film Critics Association Awards ===
Year	Category	Nominated work	Result	Ref.
2022	Best Supporting Actress	West Side Story	Won	

=== Hollywood Critics Association Awards ===
Year	Category	Nominated work	Result	Ref.
2022	Best Supporting Actress	West Side Story	Won	

=== Houston Film Critics Society Awards ===
Year	Category	Nominated work	Result	Ref.
2022	Best Supporting Actress	West Side Story	Nominated	

=== London Film Critics' Circle Awards ===
Year	Category	Nominated work	Result	Ref.
2022	Supporting Actress of the Year	West Side Story	Nominated	

=== Los Angeles Film Critics Association Awards ===
Year	Category	Nominated work	Result	Ref.
2021	Best Supporting Actress	West Side Story	Won	

=== National Society of Film Critics Awards ===
Year	Category	Nominated work	Result	Ref.
2022	Best Supporting Actress	West Side Story	Runner-up	

=== New York Film Critics Online Awards ===
Year	Category	Nominated work	Result	Ref.
2021	Breakthrough Performer		Won	

=== Online Film Critics Society Awards ===
Year	Category	Nominated work	Result	Ref.
2022	Best Supporting Actress	West Side Story	Nominated	

=== San Diego Film Critics Society Awards ===
Year	Category	Nominated work	Result	Ref.
2022	Best Supporting Actress	West Side Story	Nominated	

=== San Francisco Bay Area Film Critics Circle Awards ===
Year	Category	Nominated work	Result	Ref.
2022	Best Supporting Actress	West Side Story	Nominated	

=== Santa Barbara International Film Festival Awards ===
Year	Category	Nominated work	Result	Ref.
2022	Virtuoso Award	West Side Story	Won	

=== Seattle Film Critics Society Awards ===
Year	Category	Nominated work	Result	Ref.
2022	Best Actress in a Supporting Role	West Side Story	Won	

=== Washington D.C. Area Film Critics Association Awards ===
Year	Category	Nominated work	Result	Ref.
2021	Best Supporting Actress	West Side Story	Nominated	

== Additional awards ==
=== Black Reel Awards ===
Year	Category	Nominated work	Result	Ref.
2022	Outstanding Supporting Actress	West Side Story	Nominated	
2022	Outstanding Breakthrough Performance, Female		Won	

=== Capri Hollywood International Film Festival ===
Year	Category	Nominated work	Result	Ref.
2021	Best Supporting Actress	West Side Story	Won	

=== Dorian Awards ===
Year	Category	Nominated work	Result	Ref.
2022	Best Supporting Film Performance	West Side Story	Won	
2022	"We're Wilde About You!" Rising Star		Won	
2023	Best TV Musical Performance	"Angela Bassett Did the Thing" at the 76th British Academy Film Awards	Won	

=== Golden Raspberry Awards ===
Year	Category	Nominated work	Result	Ref.
2025	Worst Supporting Actress	Argylle	Nominated	
2025	Worst Supporting Actress	Kraven the Hunter	Nominated	
2026	Worst Actress	Love Hurts	Nominated	

=== International Cinephile Society Awards ===
Year	Category	Nominated work	Result	Ref.
2022	Best Supporting Actress	West Side Story	Nominated	

=== NAACP Image Awards ===
Year	Category	Nominated work	Result	Ref.
2022	Outstanding Breakthrough Performer in a Motion Picture	West Side Story	Nominated	
2024	Outstanding Character Voice Performance – Motion Picture	Wish	Nominated	
