= Shall We Dance? (1951 song) =

Song from the musical The King and I

Song
- Published: 1951
- Songwriter: Oscar Hammerstein II
- Composer: Richard Rodgers

"Shall We Dance?" is a show tune from the 1951 Rodgers and Hammerstein musical, The King and I. It is sung by the characters of Anna Leonowens and the King of Siam, originated on Broadway by Gertrude Lawrence and Yul Brynner respectively. Valerie Hobson played Anna in the original London West End production, and Marni Nixon (who sang the songs while Deborah Kerr lip-synced) in the 1956 film of The King and I. The song comes about after Anna and the King disagree about love's meaning; the King believes that love is a "silly complication of a pleasant simplicity" and a "fairy tale" while Anna believes that love is real and natural. They sing "The Song of the King" first. Anna then tries to explain the idea of romance in a simple way to the King, and becomes caught up in her own experience of love at first sight at an English dance. Her reminiscences become the introductory verse of "Shall We Dance?".

The song is most famous for a sequence charged with romantic tension in which Anna teaches the King to polka. Their subsequent dance usually traverses a large part of the stage.

== Reception ==
The movie version of the song finished at number 54 in AFI's 100 Years...100 Songs survey of top tunes in American cinema.

== Legacy ==
The 1996 Japanese film Shall We Dance? was named after and features the song.

In March 2021, Ariana DeBose released a reimagined recording and video of the song, produced and arranged by Justin Goldner and Benjamin Rauhala for the album R&H Goes Pop.
