= Sugar Hill Children's Museum =

Coordinates: 40°49′49.6″N 73°56′28.2″W

Sugar Hill Children's Museum of Art and Storytelling
- Former name: Sugar Hill Children's Museum
- Established: 2015
- Location: New York, New York, United States
- Type: Children's Museum
- Accreditation: American Alliance of Museums
- Founder: Ellen Baxter
- Director: Rob Fields
- President: Neil A. Bhargava
- Architect: David Adjaye
- Website: https://www.sugarhillmuseum.org/

Sugar Hill Children's Museum, officially the Sugar Hill Children's Museum of Art & Storytelling, is a children's museum located in the Sugar Hill neighborhood of Upper Manhattan. The building, which also includes a pre school and affordable housing under the auspices of Broadway Housing Communities, is known as the Sugar Hill Development, and is located at 155th Street and St. Nicholas Avenue. The museum was designed by David Adjaye and opened in September 2015.

The museum is targeted to children between the ages of three and eight given the impact that arts education has on that age group and focuses on underserved children who might not be reached by traditional art outreach.

== History ==
The museum broke ground in 2012 and was originally slated to be called the Faith Ringgold Children's Museum of Art & Storytelling in honor of the artist Faith Ringgold and her 9/11 Quilt, however she withdrew her support following concerns about the operation as a museum and security for the art. Rob Fields began as the museum's director in September 2021 following Lauren Kelley and Suzy Delvalle who had led the museum from its inception.

Since opening, it has shown the works of Derek Fordjour, Romare Bearden, Jacob Lawrence, Shani Peters and more. In addition to its exhibits, the museum has become known for its role in the social and racial justice protests that followed the murder of George Floyd and recognition of the neighborhood's role in civil rights protests.

== Architecture ==
When designing the building in a historic part of Harlem, David Adjaye sought to revitalize the community and combat poverty by bringing together affordable housing, a preschool, and a cultural institution. The museum itself occupies 17,000 square feet at the base of the 13-story building.

== Artists in Residence ==
The museum hosts an annual artist in residence program. Previous artists in residence include David Shrobe, Derek Fordjour, Leslie Jimenez, Damien Davis, Lina Puerta, and Dionis Ortiz.
