= Tommy Mottola =

American music executive (born 1948)

- Born: Thomas Daniel Mottola; July 14, 1948 (age 78) (Note: Sources differ on when Mottola was actually born – but the majority state July 14, 1948.); New York City, U.S.
- Occupations: Businessman; record executive; producer
- Known for: Former chairman & CEO, Sony Music Entertainment
- Title: Chairman, Mottola Media Group; Cofounder, Ntertain Studios
- Spouses: Lisa Clark (m. 1971; div. 1990) Mariah Carey (m. 1993; div. 1998) Thalía (m. 2000)
- Children: 4
- Honours: Hollywood Walk of Fame, Recording (2019)

Thomas Daniel Mottola (born July 14, 1948) is an American businessman, record executive and television producer. He is the chairman of Mottola Media Group and co-founder of Ntertain Studios. He was chairman and CEO of Sony Music Entertainment, parent company of the Columbia label, for nearly 15 years. He signed and promoted singer Mariah Carey, to whom he was married for five years. Since 2000, he has been married to Mexican actress/singer Thalía.

== Early life ==
Mottola was born in the Bronx, New York City, to a middle-class Italian-American family. He graduated from Iona Grammar School in 1962 and Iona Prep in 1966. After a brief period in military school, he attended high school and later Hofstra University on Long Island. However, he dropped out of Hofstra to pursue a music career as a guitarist and singer with The Exotics, an R&B cover band.

== Career ==
=== Beginnings ===
Mottola entered the music industry in the mid-1960s as a recording artist for CBS Records, performing under the name "T.D. Valentine." When his recording career did not achieve commercial success, he shifted into music management. He began working for Chappell Publishing, where he connected with various artists, and later established his own management company, leveraging new media formats such as music videos and promotional tours to boost their visibility.

=== Sony/Columbia ===
In 1988, Mottola was hired by Sony Music Entertainment (then known as CBS Records) by Walter Yetnikoff to run its United States operations. In 1990, he succeeded Yetnikoff as chairman and CEO of the newly renamed Sony Music. During his tenure, Sony Music expanded its operations to over 60 countries and became the first major music company to offer digital downloads commercially. By 2000, Sony Music's annual revenue exceeded $6 billion. Mottola signed and promoted the artists Mariah Carey, Celine Dion, Jennifer Lopez, Gloria Estefan, CoCo Lee, Jessica Simpson, Destiny's Child, the Dixie Chicks, and Shakira. He also oversaw the release of digitally remastered compact discs of recordings by artists including Barbra Streisand, Bruce Springsteen, Billy Joel, Andy Williams, and Pink Floyd. Mottola also worked with Michael Jackson during the production and promotion of Jackson's Dangerous album. However, their professional relationship deteriorated during the promotion of Jackson's 2001 album Invincible. Jackson accused Mottola of exploitative practices and labeled him a "racist who exploited black talent."

=== After Sony ===
Mottola was the head of Sony Music Entertainment until January 2003. Following his departure, he established a new entertainment company encompassing recorded music, television production, theater, fashion, and branding management. The company was involved in reviving and managing the careers of artists such as Marc Anthony and Lindsay Lohan. Later, Mottola expanded his roster to include the artists Cassie Ventura and Mika.

In a joint venture with Universal Music Group, Mottola revived Casablanca Records. Under this venture, he signed artists Lindsay Lohan and Mika. After leaving Sony in 2003, Mottola founded Mottola Media Group, which has produced various projects across theater, television, and music. Among its productions is the musical adaptation of Chazz Palminteri's A Bronx Tale. Palminteri credited Mottola with realizing the project and bringing it to fruition, stating that Mottola "put the musical on his back" while partnering with Dodger Properties. The production premiered on Broadway in December 2016 and ran until August 5, 2018. A national tour commenced in October 2018 at the Pantages Theatre in Los Angeles.

In January 2013, Mottola published his memoir, Hitmaker: The Man and His Music, co-written with Cal Fussman. The book offers insights into his career, the music industry, and his relationships with artists. In collaboration with Dodger Properties, Mottola Media Group also produced several other musicals, including Summer: The Donna Summer Musical (2017), Jersey Boys (Off-Broadway, 2004), and Groundhog Day (2016). In 2018, Mottola Media Group signed a multi-year first-look deal with eOne, now part of Lionsgate, to develop scripted and unscripted television projects. Mottola also created and produced documentaries for HBO, including The Latin Explosion: A New America (2015) and 15: A Quinceañera Story (2017), the latter of which earned a Directors Guild of America (DGA) nomination.

In March 2021, Mottola co-founded Ntertain Studios with Neon16 CEO and co-founder Lex Borrero, alongside representation firm Range Media Partners. Ntertain is described as "an entertainment and media company that creates, develops, and produces content across multiple mediums, highlighting Latino stories and representing Latino talent, brands, and culture."

Ntertain's productions include:

Los Montaner for Disney+, which was renewed for a second season. Thalía's Mixtape: El Soundtrack de Mi Vida for Paramount+. La Firma (The Signing) and Neon for Netflix. In 2023, Ntertain partnered with Audio Up Media to launch original Latino podcast programming and other multimedia projects.

== Personal life ==
Mottola began dating Mariah Carey while she was recording Mariah Carey. Three years later they married at the Episcopal Saint Thomas Church in New York City, on June 5, 1993, in a half-million dollar ceremony. The newlyweds moved into a custom-built mansion, located on a 51-acre (21 ha) estate in Bedford, New York, referred to by Carey as “Sing Sing” (alluding to her feeling imprisoned there). Their relationship began to deteriorate due to their growing creative differences in terms of her music. They separated in December 1996 and announced it publicly on May 30, 1997. The couple divorced on March 4, 1998, and shortly afterwards, they sold their home to Nelson Peltz for $20.5 million; it burned down in 1999.

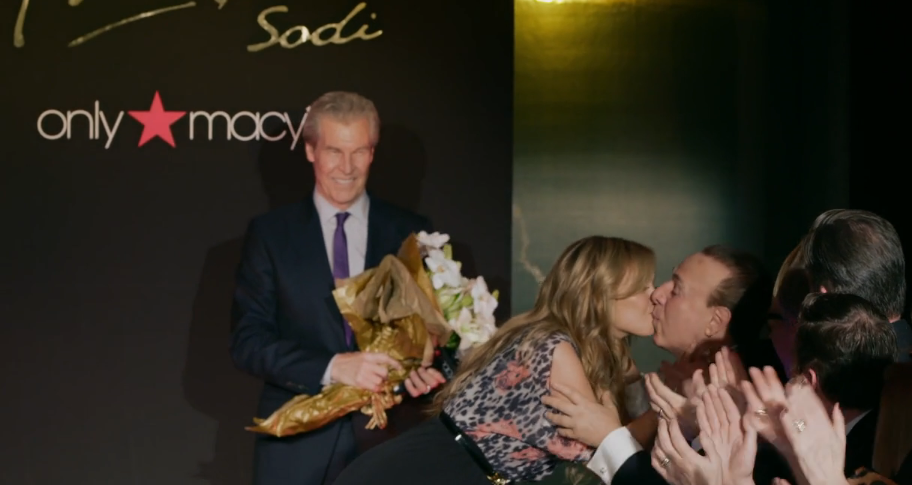
Thalía and Tommy Mottola kissing at her Macy's Thalía Collection

Mottola married Thalía on December 2, 2000. The couple have two children, a daughter born in October 2007 and a son born in June 2011.

=== Relationship with Jeffrey Epstein ===
Mottola maintained a personal relationship with convicted sex offender Jeffrey Epstein. Emails obtained in 2023 by The Daily Beast from authorities in the U.S. Virgin Islands via a Freedom of Information Act request indicated several phone calls between Epstein and Mottola. At the time, Mottola commented via his publicist, “Mr. Epstein and I shared some mutual acquaintances, and he called me several times to request concert tickets, as many people do.” However, on February 12, 2026, Page Six first reported that emails from the Epstein files released on January 30, 2026 by the United States Department of Justice document a closer personal relationship with Epstein between 2010 and 2018. In late 2017, the #MeToo movement hit, and Mottola seemed rattled. In an exchange between the two men, they discussed a woman hiring a lawyer. Epstein wrote: ‘Itou [sic] are safe.’ Mottola responded: ‘You’re sure?.. I don’t have to do anything just shut up and Lay low.’ A few months later, following a Les Moonves expose in The New Yorker, Epstein wrote to Mottola: ‘did you see the massage section in the monves piece. we should thank our lucky stars.’ […] For the better part of a decade, there are dozens of Mottola calls, visits, and unanswered calls to Epstein’s Paris abode.”

In February 2026, after the release of the alleged emails, a branded pasta sauce venture planned with Jimmy Fallon was paused.

== Awards and recognitions ==
- City of Hope Spirit of Life Award (1990): Recognizing his philanthropic efforts and contributions to the City of Hope's mission.
- Billboard Power Player of the Year (1993): Acknowledging his influence and leadership in the music industry.
- TJ Martell Foundation, Humanitarian of the Year: Honoring his commitment to supporting cancer, leukemia, and AIDS research.
- National Italian American Foundation, Honoree: Celebrating his achievements and contributions as a prominent figure of Italian-American heritage.
- Star on the Hollywood Walk of Fame (2019): A testament to his enduring impact and legacy in the world of entertainment.

== In popular culture ==
- Hall & Oates' song "Gino (The Manager)", from the duo's album Daryl Hall & John Oates (1975), was written about Mottola. The record jacket insert reads: "And introducing Tommy Mottola as 'Little Gino'".
- The character of Gene Balboa, in the Channel 101 Internet TV series Yacht Rock, is loosely based on Mottola, in particular his time as Hall & Oates' manager.
- In The Sopranos season 4 episode 2, No Show, Janice says “Tommy Mottola at Sony, looks like he's gonna offer us a deal." Later in the same episode Tony states "That Tommy Mottola is one slow motherfucker"
- In JAY-Z's song "Success" featuring Nas, track 12 from his studio album American Gangster, Nas mentions "Mottola" in the last line of his third verse. "Up your catalog, dog, mine's worth too much. Like Mike Jacks ATV pub, Mottola can't touch. Let this bitch breathe! (Ha heh)"
- In the Fugees song “How Many Mics” the 2nd track from debut album The Score, Wyclef Jean raps mention Motolla with the verse “Street pressure, word to papa, I ain't goin' under, One day I'll have a label and make deals with Tommy Mottola"

== Written works ==
- Mottola, Tommy, A New America: How Music Reshaped the Culture and Future of a Nation and Redefined My Life (Celebra, 2016) ISBN 0451467787.
- Mottola, Tommy with Cal Fussman, Hitmaker: The Man and His Music (New York: Grand Central Publishing, 2013) ISBN 978-0446585187.
- Tosches, Nick, Dangerous Dances: The Authorized Biography (New York: St. Martin's Press, 1984) ISBN 0283991895.

== Notes ==
He said his birthday is July 14th in a podcast, however he does not mention what year.

== Sources ==
- Carey, Mariah; Davis, Michaela Angela (2020). The Meaning of Mariah Carey. New York: Andy Cohen Books. ISBN 978-1-250-16468-1.
- Hirsch, Lily E. (2023). Can't Stop the Grrrls. Rowman & Littlefield. ISBN 978-1538169063.
- Nickson, Chris (1998). Mariah Carey revisited. New York: St. Martin's Griffin. ISBN 978-0-312-19512-0.
- Shapiro, Marc (2001). Mariah Carey. Toronto: ECW Press. ISBN 978-1-55022-444-3. Archived from the original on January 19, 2023.
