= Jared Gutstadt =

American music executive (born 1977)

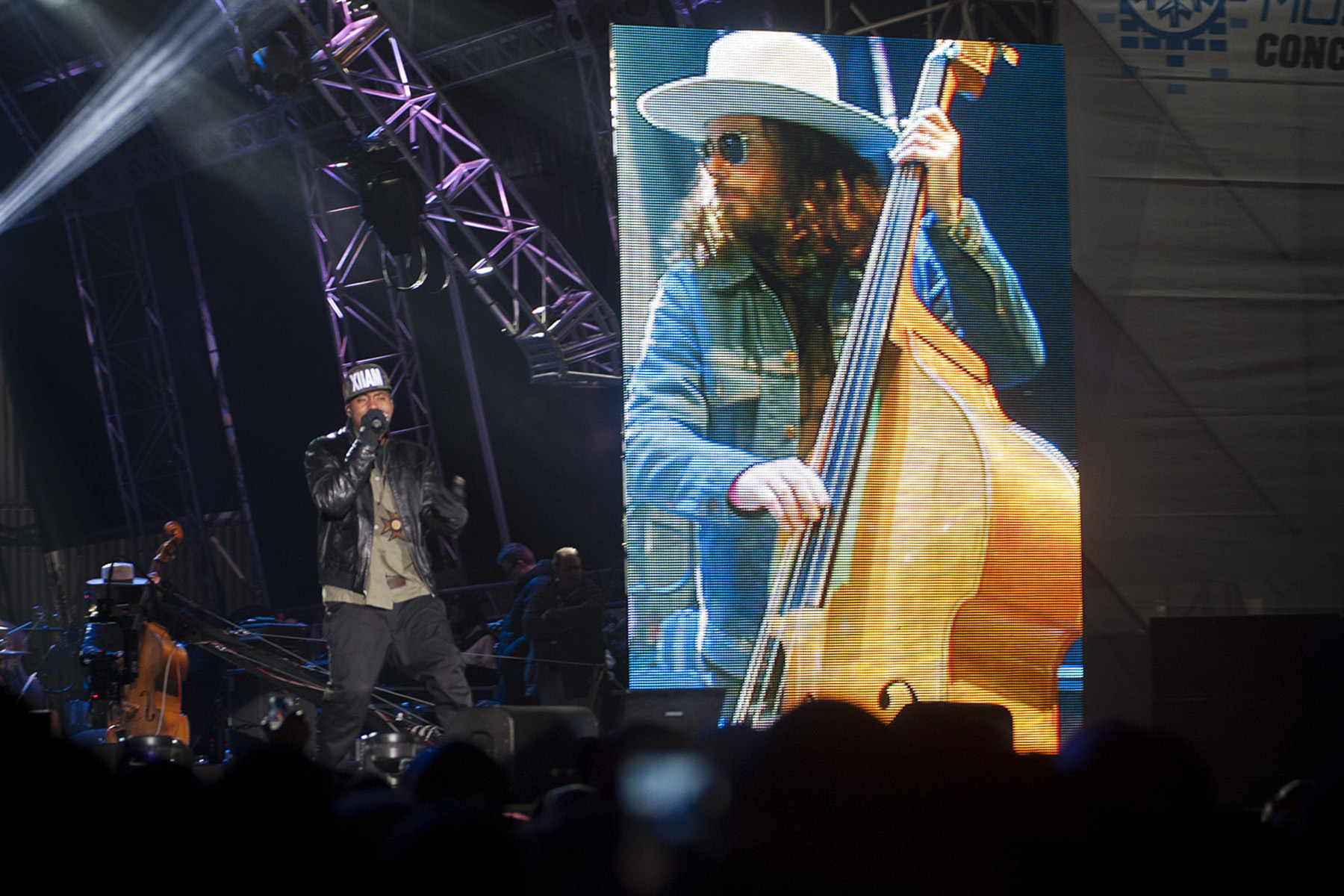
- Jared and nas in concert big screen
- Born: Jared Adam Gutstadt; September 19, 1977 (age 49); Toronto, Ontario, Canada
- Other name: Jingle Jared
- Education: New York University, MA, Interactive Technology, 2002
- Years active: 2002-present
- Children: 5
- Website: www.audioup.com

Jared Gutstadt (born September 19, 1977), also known as Jingle Jared, is a Canadian-born entrepreneur, inventor, and musician best known for founding the creative music agency Jingle Punks (2008), and the scripted-podcast network Audio Up Media (2020).

Through Jingle Punks, Gutstadt acquired and created a catalog of 500,000 songs and a roster of over 1,000 television shows.

His latest venture, Audio Up Media, specializes in scripted podcasts that feature original music from known and emerging artists. Audio Up's present and future collaborators include Dennis Quaid, Anthony Anderson, Scarlett Burke, Michael Cohen, James Ellroy, Maejor, and Stephen King.

His musical collaborators include Bob Dylan, Steven Tyler, Timbaland, Nas, Lil Wayne, Brad Paisley, Miranda Lambert, Machine Gun Kelly, Jelly Roll, and others.

== Early life and education ==
Born and raised in Toronto, Jared studied media and culture at the University of Western Ontario.

In 2000, he moved to New York City to attend NYU's Tisch School of the Arts. Jared then worked at Viacom as a video editor on projects such as MTV Cribs and Chappelle’s Show.

As a video editor, Gutstadt faced a licensing conundrum: the shows needed music, but known names were too expensive. After Chappelle's Show executive producer Neal Brennan discovered that Gutstadt had worked his own music into the edits, Brennan called him a "jingle punk," and the moniker stuck.

== Jingle Punks ==
In 2008, Gutstadt and Dan Demole co-founded Jingle Punks, a music publishing and licensing company headquartered in New York. With a catalog of nearly 500k songs, it forms one of the largest publishing libraries in the world. Jingle Punks received ASCAP Film & TV Awards in 2010, 2011, 2012, 2013, and 2014 for scoring The Voice, as well as their theme song for Pawn Stars, composed by Gutstadt.

By 2017, it had provided music to more than 1000 TV series, including The Taste, Real Housewives of Atlanta, American Pickers, and Skip and Shannon: Undisputed.

=== History ===
Within months of launching the company, Gutstadt and Demole released their platform, "The Jingle Player" which provides targeted music selection with a searchable interface. Company-approved artists submit their music to the Jingle Player, with the profits split 50-50.

In late 2012, talent agency William Morris Endeavor acquired a majority stake in Jingle Punks, and the company was sold again to ole Music Publishing in March 2015. In January 2020, Gutstadt left Jingle Punks to found Audio Up Media.

==== Bear and a Banjo podcast (2019) ====
After collaborating on History Channel's 2016 revision of Roots, Gutstadt and producer Jason “Poo Bear” Boyd created a musical podcast Bear and a Banjo, which follows the unlikely duo of Bear (Boyd) and Banjo (Gutstadt), who are placed in pivotal moments of American musical history à la the 1994 film Forrest Gump.

In what narrator Dennis Quaid describes as “a true fiction of American music,” Bear and Banjo stumble upon the wrongful conviction of Lead Belly, an ill-fated card game with Sonny Liston, the wedding of Sister Rosetta Tharpe, the birth of the CIA, and a young Bob Dylan at a softball game. The accompanying album was produced by T Bone Burnett with an original song written by Bob Dylan.

== Audio Up Media ==
In 2020, Gutstadt founded Audio Up Media, a production studio and platform for podcasts which Gutstadt imagines as “an HBO for your ears.”

In May 2020, Audio Up received a 4.5 million-dollar investment from MGM Studios which includes a first-look deal at adaptations. Two more rounds of funding included investments from the Weeknd, Ben Lurie, SiriusXM, Primary Wave, and Reservoir Media. With offices in Los Angeles and Nashville, Audio Up plans to produce at least 40 podcasts a year that it will develop into IP.

In 2020, Gutstadt received two Adweek awards for Podcast Innovator and Producer of the Year.

== Musical collaborators ==
In a decades-long career, Gutstadt has collaborated numerous artists across multiple genres.

In 2013, Gutstadt co-wrote the theme for Pawn Stars with Lynyrd Skynyrd.

In June 2014, Gutstadt accompanied Nas in Johannesburg, South Africa, with his Jingle Punks-sourced The Hipster Orchestra. This concert was later commemorated through nine NFTs with the proceeds benefiting Nile Rodgers' We Are Family Foundation.

In 2014, Gutstadt produced Whiskey Sessions, a five-song acoustic EP for Jelly Roll which began Jelly Roll's transformation from Hip Hop to country and rock star. In a 2015 interview, Jelly Roll called Gutstadt "the jew who changed my life. . . he really built me into confidence in my voice and built the entire sound on what we are doing now." They later collaborated on "Bad News Travels Fast" in 2016 and on Whiskey Sessions II in 2019.

In June 2016, Gutstadt co-wrote "Hold On (Won't Let Go" for Steven Tyler's first solo album. In September, Gutstadt wrote and produced "No Mercy," the theme song for Fox Sport's Skip and Shannon: Undisputed, performed by Lil Wayne.

In 2017, Gutstadt and Timbaland co-wrote three songs for Brad Paisley's album Love and War on Arista Nashville.

In 2018, Gutstadt, Poo Bear, and DJ Khaled wrote the theme song for the Miami Marlins baseball team "Just Gettin' Started" which was performed on Opening Day.

On the 2019 Bear and a Banjo podcast, Gutstadt produced songs with lyrics by Bob Dylan and Zac Brown.

The Make It Up as We Go podcast (2020,2022) saw collaborations with Miranda Lambert, Lindsey Ell, Tyler Rich, Shooter Jennings, Nile Rodgers, and Liz Rose.

The Halloween in Hell podcast (2020) featured Machine Gun Kelly, iann dior, 24kGolden, Dana Dentata, and Tommy Lee. In April 2021, Gutstadt and Jeff Peters co-wrote Machine Gun Kelly's single "Love Race" featuring Kellin Quinn and Travis Barker.

== Discography ==
- The Izzys, The Izzys (2004)
- The Izzys, Fast and Out of Control Wins the Race (2005)
- Group Sounds, EP (2005)
- Group Sounds, Group Sounds (2006)
- The Hipster Orchestra, Hipster Dinner Party, Vol. 1 (2011)
- The Hipster Orchestra, The Nirvana Sessions (2011)
- The Hipster Orchestra, King of Instruments (2012) (w/ Alex Collier)
- The Hipster Orchestra, "Mirrors" (2013)
- The Hipster Orchestra, The In Utero Sessions (2013)
