= Ariana DeBose =

American actress (born 1991)

- DeBose in 2026
- Born: January 25, 1991 (age 35); Wilmington, North Carolina, U.S.
- Occupations: Actress; singer
- Years active: 2009–present
- Partner: Sue Makkoo (2017–2023)
- Awards: Full list

Ariana DeBose (/ˌɑːriˈɑːnə dəˈboʊz/; born January 25, 1991) is an American actress and singer who has received various accolades, including an Academy Award, a BAFTA Award, and a Golden Globe Award, in addition to nominations for a Tony Award and two Primetime Emmy Awards. In 2022, Time magazine named her one of the 100 most influential people in the world.

DeBose was a contestant on the sixth season of So You Think You Can Dance in 2009. She made her Broadway debut in Bring It On: The Musical in 2011 and continued her work on Broadway with roles in Motown: The Musical (2013) and Pippin (2014), Hamilton (2015–2016), and A Bronx Tale (2016–2017). In 2018, she was nominated for the Tony Award for Best Featured Actress in a Musical for her performance as Donna Summer in Summer: The Donna Summer Musical. She has also hosted the Tony Awards in 2022, 2023, and 2024.

DeBose has also appeared in the Netflix musical comedy film The Prom (2020) and the Apple TV+ musical comedy series Schmigadoon! (2021–2023). She gained wider recognition for her role as Anita in Steven Spielberg's musical film West Side Story (2021), winning the Academy Award for Best Supporting Actress. She provided the voice of Asha in the animated film Wish (2023).

== Early life, family and education ==
Ariana DeBose was born on January 25, 1991, in Wilmington, North Carolina. She was raised in Raleigh, North Carolina. Her mother, Gina DeBose, was a middle school teacher. DeBose has stated that her father is Puerto Rican and her mother was white. She also has African-American and Italian ancestry.

DeBose trained in dance at CC & Co. Dance Complex in Raleigh.

== Career ==
=== Early work and Broadway roles (2009–2016) ===
DeBose made her television debut in 2009, when she competed on the TV series So You Think You Can Dance, making it into the Top 20. She later appeared on the soap opera One Life to Live and played Little Inez Stubbs in the North Carolina Theatre's production of Hairspray before appearing in the role of Nautica in the 2011 Alliance Theatre production of Bring It On. She also appeared in the ensemble of the New York Philharmonic production of Company, which was filmed for television. At the end of 2011, Bring It On embarked on a national tour across the United States. DeBose continued her role into the 2012 Broadway production and understudied the character Danielle.

In 2013, DeBose played Mary Wilson in Motown on Broadway, understudying the role of Diana Ross. She later joined the cast of Pippin on Broadway, playing a noble and a player and understudying the role of the Leading Player, which she ended up taking over for a short period in 2014. She can be heard playing director/choreographer Zoey Taylor in As the Curtain Rises, an original Broadway soap opera podcast from the Broadway Podcast Network.

In 2015, DeBose left Pippin to join the ensemble of the Off-Broadway musical Hamilton, in which she developed her ensemble part as representing the bullet that would eventually kill Alexander Hamilton. The show moved to Broadway later that year. She left Hamilton in July 2016 and made a guest appearance on the TV series Blue Bloods as Sophia Ortiz. From November 2016 to August 2017, DeBose portrayed Jane on Broadway in A Bronx Tale.

=== Breakthrough (2017–2022) ===
In late 2017, DeBose was cast in her breakthrough role, playing Donna Summer in Summer: The Donna Summer Musical at San Diego's La Jolla Playhouse. She reprised this role in the Broadway production, which opened in April 2018. Despite mixed reviews, she was nominated for the 2018 Tony Award for Best Featured Actress in a Musical at the 72nd Tony Awards. She also starred as Daphne in the thriller film Seaside on that same year, directed by Sam Zalutsky.

DeBose played Alyssa Greene in the film adaptation of The Prom, directed by Ryan Murphy, where she was opposite of Jo Ellen Pellman as Emma Nolan. In March 2021, DeBose released a dance-pop recording and video of Rodgers and Hammerstein's "Shall We Dance?" for the album R&H Goes Pop, produced by Justin Goldner and arranged by Benjamin Rauhala. In 2021, DeBose played schoolmarm Emma Tate in season 1 of the parody musical comedy series Schmigadoon! on Apple TV+. In season 2 of Schmigadoon! in 2023, she played the role of Emcee.

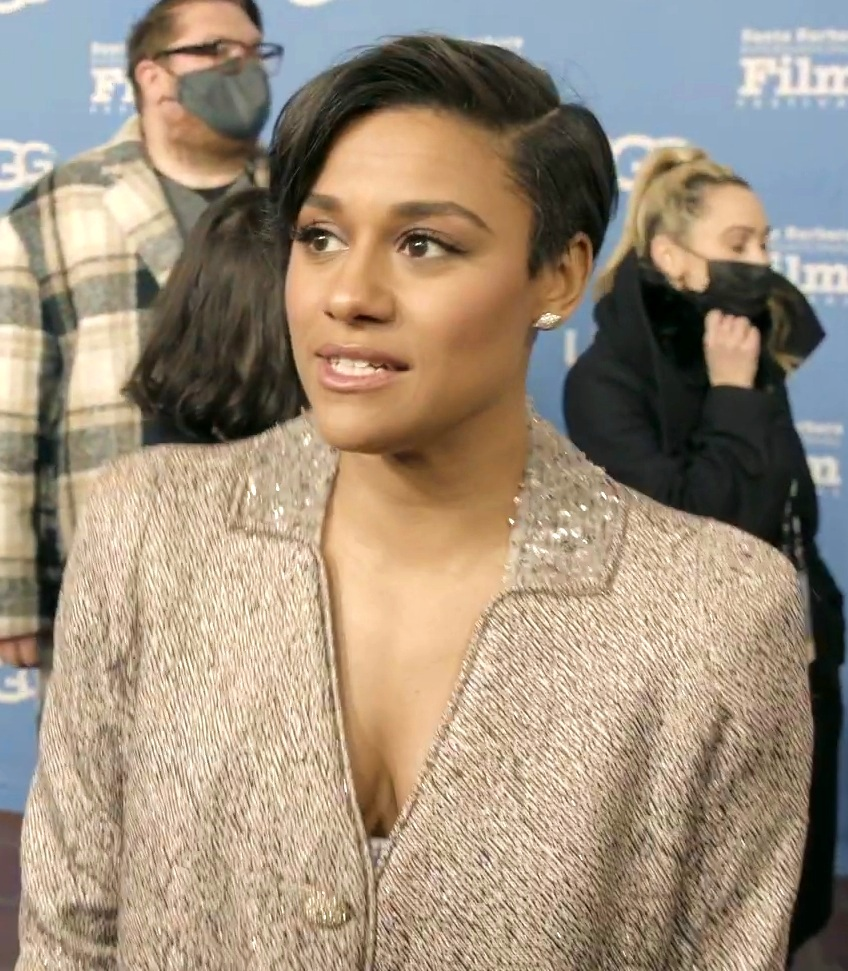
Debose in 2022

Despite not seeing herself playing the role and initially refusing four times to audition for it, DeBose played Anita in the 2021 film adaptation of the musical West Side Story, directed by Steven Spielberg. The film was released in December 2021 to critical acclaim. DeBose received critical attention for her performance of Anita, with Caryn James of BBC praising her performance, declaring, "Anita, in a layered, dynamic performance by Ariana DeBose, is the centre of attention, swirling her skirt and dancing to the Latin rhythms that infuse the film." David Fear of Rolling Stone wrote, "DeBose...strong contender for Most Valuable Player here, whose energy—in her singing, her dancing, her line-reading, her side-eyeing—could power a metropolitan block." She also received multiple accolades, including a Golden Globe Award, a BAFTA Award, a Choice Movie Award, and a Screen Actors Guild Award, making her the first Afro-Latina and queer woman of color to win the latter award, and the Academy Award for Best Supporting Actress at the 94th Academy Awards.

Following her West Side Story success, it was announced that DeBose would host the 75th Tony Awards. DeBose called the opportunity to host "a bucket list moment" that "I didn't know I had." She received generally positive reviews for the show and received a nomination for the Primetime Emmy Award for Outstanding Variety Special (Live) at the 75th Primetime Emmy Awards. She also made a recurring appearance in the fourth season of the HBO science fiction series Westworld.

=== 2023–present ===
DeBose went viral on Twitter after performing at the 76th British Academy Film Awards, where she celebrated the female nominees by name in an original freestyle rap performance. Despite being described by Variety as “a little out of breath at some points” and that the lyrics "felt clumsy", show producer Nick Bullen defended the performance, claiming it was well received by the live audience and that the criticism was "incredibly unfair" and he "absolutely loved it". The rap went viral with lines like "Angela Bassett did the thing" becoming pop culture memes. DeBose has subsequently performed the rap in concert. DeBose voiced the lead character Asha in the 2023 Disney animated film Wish.

In 2024, DeBose had a starring role in the science-fiction thriller I.S.S. and a supporting role in the spy film Argylle. She appeared as Calypso Ezili in the superhero film Kraven the Hunter, directed by J.C. Chandor. The following year, DeBose starred in the action comedy Love Hurts alongside Ke Huy Quan; DeBose was the one who presented Quan with his Oscar at the 95th Academy Awards in 2022. All these films were poorly received by critics.

She will next play Cordelia alongside Al Pacino in Lear Rex, a film adaptation of William Shakespeare’s King Lear.

== Personal life ==
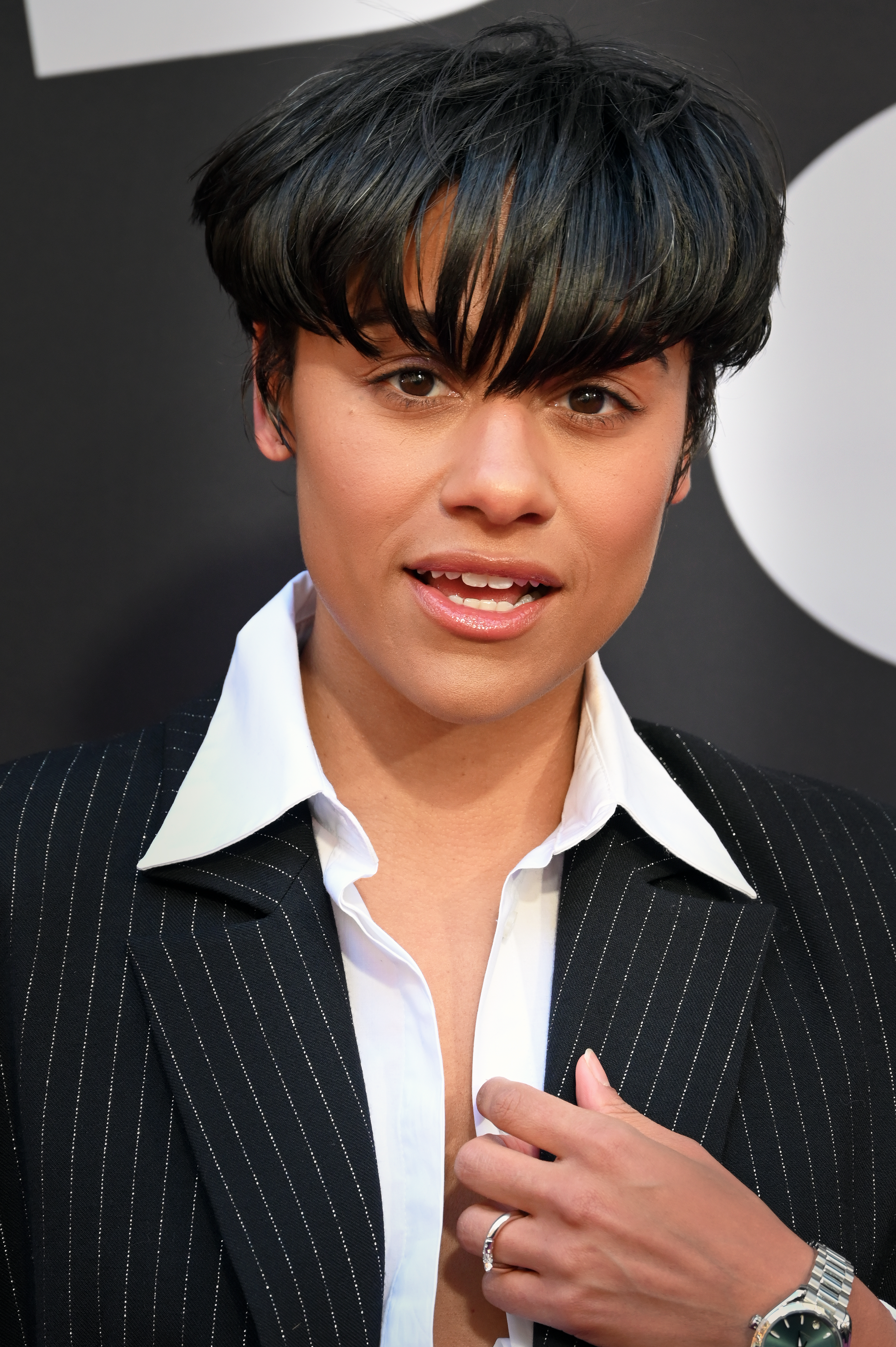
Debose in 2025

DeBose is queer and came out to her grandparents in 2015. In December 2020, DeBose and Pellman launched the Unruly Hearts Initiative. The initiative was created to help young people connect with organizations and charities that advocate for the LGBTQ community.

DeBose was in a relationship with costume designer and professor Sue Makkoo. The pair met while working on Summer: The Donna Summer Musical in 2017. Previously, DeBose was in a romantic relationship with theater props master Jill Johnson. The pair met while both were working on Motown.

In April 2025, DeBose faced criticism after sharing a quote on Instagram that was originally used to denounce her former West Side Story co-star, Rachel Zegler. The quote, stating "Narcissism is not something to be coddled or encouraged," was initially posted by Jonah Platt, son of Snow White (2025) producer Marc Platt, in response to Zegler's political comments during the promotion of the film, criticizing Zegler for bringing personal politics into the film's promotion and suggesting that her actions negatively impacted its box office performance. DeBose deleted her post and clarified that she was unaware of the quote's origin or its connection to Zegler. She explained that she frequently shares quotes she finds meaningful without researching their origins.

== Acting credits ==
Key
†	Denotes films that have not yet been released

=== Film ===
Ariana DeBose' film credits
Year	Title	Role	Notes
2011	Company	Ensemble	Filmed version of the musical
2018	Seaside	Daphne	
2019	Fragile	Her	Short film
2020	Hamilton	Ensemble / The Bullet / Martha	Filmed version of the musical
2020	Bibhu Mohapatra: Spring/Summer 2021 NYFW	The Muse	Short film
2020	The Prom	Alyssa Greene	
2021	West Side Story	Anita	
2023	Once Upon a Studio	Asha	Voice; short film
2023	I.S.S.	Kira Foster	
2023	Wish	Asha	Voice
2024	Argylle	Keira	
2024	House of Spoils	Chef	
2024	Kraven the Hunter	Calypso Ezili	
2025	Love Hurts	Rose	
2025	Tow	Denise	Also executive producer
TBA	Lear Rex †	Cordelia	Completed

=== Television ===
Ariana DeBose' television credits
Year	Title	Role	Notes
2009	So You Think You Can Dance	Herself	Contestant (season 6)
2016	Blue Bloods	Sophia Ortiz	Episode: "The Road to Hell"
2016	Hamilton's America	Herself	Television documentary
2021–2023	Schmigadoon!	Emma Tate / Emcee	Main role; 9 episodes
2022	Saturday Night Live	Herself	Host; episode: "Ariana DeBose/Bleachers"
2022	Human Resources	Danielle	Voice; episode: "Rutgers is for Lovers"
2022	75th Tony Awards	Herself	Host; television special
2022	Westworld	Maya	Recurring role; 5 episodes (season 4)
2022	Bubble Guppies	Lulu	Voice; episode: "A Big Splash!"
2023	76th Tony Awards	Herself	Host; television special
2024	Fraggle Rock: Back to the Rock	Mezzo	Voice; episode: "The Great Wind"
2024	77th Tony Awards	Herself	Host; television special
2026	Scarpetta	Lucy Farinelli-Watson	Main role
2026	The Voice	Herself	Advisor for Team Kelly (season 30)

=== Theater ===
Ariana DeBose' theater credits
Year	Title	Role	Theatre
2011	Hairspray	Little Inez Stubbs	North Carolina Theatre
2011	Company	Ensemble	Avery Fisher Hall, New York City
2011–2012	Bring It On: The Musical	Nautica, u/s Danielle	Alliance Theatre, Atlanta
2011–2012	Bring It On: The Musical	Nautica, u/s Danielle	National Tour
2011–2012	Bring It On: The Musical	Nautica, u/s Danielle	St. James Theatre, Broadway
2013	Motown: The Musical	Ensemble, Mary Wilson, u/s Diana Ross	Lunt-Fontanne Theatre, Broadway
2014	Pippin	Noble, u/s Leading Player	Music Box Theatre, Broadway
2014	Pippin	The Leading Player	Music Box Theatre, Broadway
2015	Hamilton	Ensemble / Martha / The Bullet	The Public Theater, Off-Broadway
2015	Hamilton	Ensemble / Martha / The Bullet	Richard Rodgers Theatre, Broadway
2015	Les Misérables	Éponine	Connecticut Repertory Theatre
2016	A Bronx Tale	Jane	Longacre Theatre, Broadway
2017	Summer: The Donna Summer Musical	Donna Summer	La Jolla Playhouse, San Diego
2018	Summer: The Donna Summer Musical	Donna Summer	Lunt-Fontanne Theatre, Broadway
2023	Ariana DeBose In Concert	Herself	London Palladium, London
2023	Ariana DeBose In Concert	Herself	Lincoln Center, New York City
2023	Gutenberg! The Musical!	The Guest Producer	James Earl Jones Theatre, Broadway
2025	The Baker's Wife	Genevieve Castagnet	Classic Stage Company, Off-Broadway
2026	Sweet Charity	Charity Hope Valentine	Workshop

== Awards and nominations ==
In 2018, her performance in Summer: The Donna Summer Musical earned her a nomination for the Tony Award for Best Featured Actress in a Musical. For playing Anita in Steven Spielberg's West Side Story (2021), she won the Academy Award, BAFTA, Critics' Choice, Golden Globe and SAG Award for Best Supporting Actress. Her Oscar win made her the first Afro-Latina and first openly queer woman of color to win an Academy Award for acting. Additionally, with her win following Rita Moreno's 1962 win in the same category for West Side Story (1961), DeBose and Moreno became the third pair of actors to win an Academy Award for playing the same character in different films.

== See also ==
- List of actors with Academy Award nominations
- List of Afro-Latinos
- List of Hispanic Academy Award winners and nominees
- List of LGBTQ Academy Award winners and nominees
- List of superlative Academy Award winners and nominees — Performances of the same character
- List of Golden Globe winners
