= Dan Demole =

American entrepreneur (born 1979)

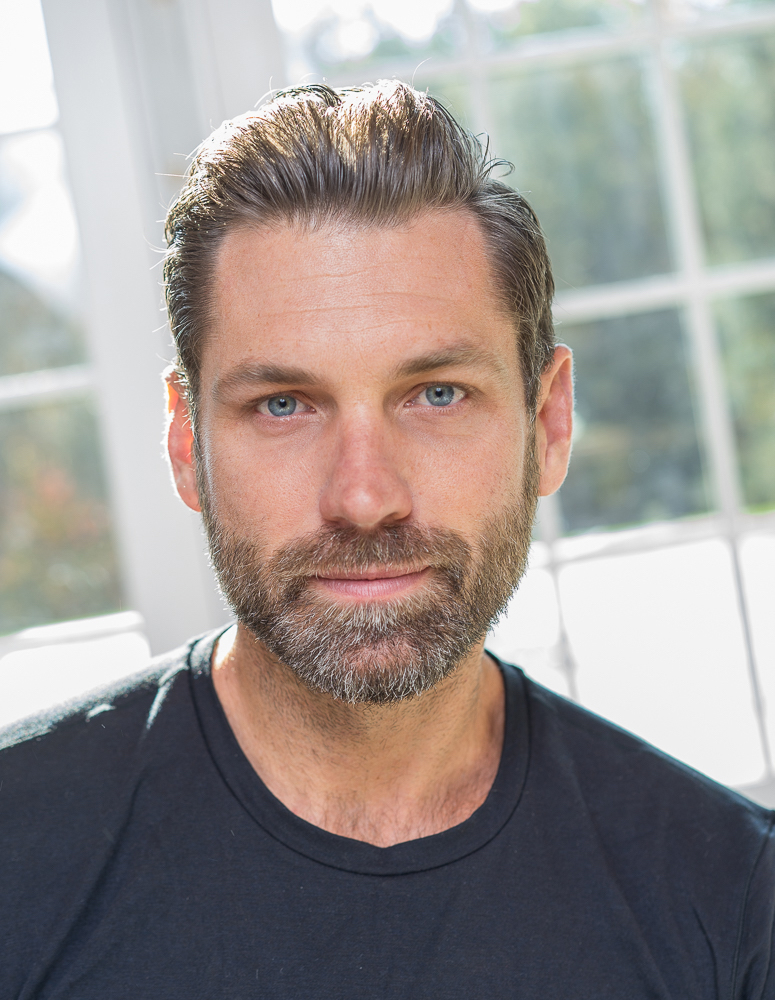
- Born: Daniel Paul Demole; May 7, 1979 (age 47); Titusville, Florida
- Education: University of Central Florida, BS, Computer Science, 2001
- Occupation: CEO of Slipstream Music (formerly Slip.stream
- Website: www.slipstreammusic.com

Dan Demole (born 1979) is an American entrepreneur, co-founder and CEO of the music company Slipstream. He is the former co-founder and COO of Jingle Punks Music. He has been featured in Billboard, Variety, and Business Week.

Prior to starting his first company Jingle Punks Music, Demole worked for L-3 Communications and Electronic Arts and was a graduate of the University of Central Florida, receiving a BS degree in computer science.

== Jingle Punks ==
Dan Demole started Jingle Punks Music with musician and television editor Jared Gutstadt after meeting at a Black Keys concert in Brooklyn, New York. Within months of launching the company, they released their platform, "The Jingle Player". Developed by Demole with industry knowledge input from Gutstadt, it helped them differentiate themselves quickly from their competitors. The web-based music player was built on proprietary, patented technology that provided targeted music selections for licensing purposes. With a catalog of nearly 500k songs, it forms one of the largest publishing libraries in the world.

In late 2012, talent agency William Morris Endeavor acquired a majority stake in Jingle Punks. The company was later sold to ole Music Publishing (now Anthem Records) in March 2015, after growing its revenue from $5 million in 2011 to more than $18 million in 2014. Demole served as the Managing Director of Jingle Punks in their Tribeca office in New York City before being promoted to Global President, Anthem Production Music Group in 2019.

== Slipstream Music ==
In 2021, he founded a new music licensing business, Slipstream Music, along with co-founders David Carson and Jesse Korwin. The company raised $3.25m of venture funding from Third Prime Capital, LightShed Ventures, Operator Partners, and Dash Fund. Six time Grammy award winning artist and producer T-Pain joined the Slipstream Advisory board and also released his collection of royalty free music, The Pizzle Pack 3, through the company in October 2021.

Slipstream raised $7.5m in May 2022 from investors Sony Music Entertainment, Third Prime, and Lightshed Ventures. “We’ve long believed that the music industry was ready to explore innovative models addressing creators and streamers’ need for quality music in their content. This funding round along with our new partners is validation of this belief. It’s a win and a step in the right direction for creators and musicians everywhere," Dan was quoted as saying in Music Business Worldwide.

In October 2024, Slipstream acquired Anthem Entertainment’s production music catalogs (Jingle Punks, 5 Alarm Music, and Cavendish Music) adding over 650,000 tracks to Slipstreams catalog.

Demole founded Jingle Punks and sold it to Anthem more than a decade earlier. Regarding the acquisition, Demole stated that Jingle Punks and Slipstream were established to provide music to creators. The organization plans to continue both brands and work in music licensing. Using its catalog and platform, the organization is an independent entity in the industry.

In 2026, Slipstream acquired Megatrax Production Music. Megatrax, founded as a composer-led library, provides music for television, film, and advertising. CEO, Dan Demole, stated the acquisition was part of a strategy to consolidate the company's catalog and expand its presence in the Latin American market saying “By integrating it into our proprietary licensing platform, we can modernize distribution, expand directly into Latin America, and improve Slipstream’s offering to our clients around the globe.”.
