= The Hipster Orchestra =

- Genres: Pop, orchestral
- Years active: 2011-present
- Labels: Razor And Tie
- Members: Jared Gutstadt; Matt Chambless; Jeff Peters; Bill Markt; Shota Ike; Sarah Whitney; Laura Metcalf; Angela Pickett
- Website: hipsterorchestra.com

The Hipster Orchestra is a chamber group formed by Jared Gutstadt, the CEO of Jingle Punks Music, the New York-based music production, licensing, and creative agency. The band is known for their arrangements of contemporary music and established classics for a string-based chamber group. The Hipster Orchestra was initially launched as a way to garner more composing and arranging work for the parent company Jingle Punks' creative studio, but has gone on to make numerous records and perform throughout the world.

The group has released albums on Razor and Tie Records and independently.

== Style ==
The Hipster Orchestra arranges contemporary pop, indie, and hip-hop songs into chamber music, occasionally augmenting the sound with rock and folk instruments.

== History ==
The Hipster Orchestra was formed in 2011 by Jingle Punks Music CEO Jared Gutstadt along with employees from the company. While the group features outside members, the personnel is primarily rooted in the Jingle Punks company.

The group began posting videos of songs in April 2011, beginning with a cover of the Strokes then-newly released “Under Cover Of Darkness.” New York magazine described the cover as “classy.” In May 2011, covers of MGMT's “Time To Pretend” and the Black Keys' “Tighten Up” followed, also premiered via online video.

On September 27, 2011, the Hipster Orchestra released two albums: Hipster Dinner Party Vol. 1 and The Nirvana Sessions, the latter of which was made to commemorate the 20th anniversary of Nirvana's Nevermind, commissioned by Primary Wave, Nirvana's publishing company. MTV described the record as “incredible” and “pretty inspiring to say the least.” The group's cover of “Lithium” was featured on the front page of YouTube as part of the site's celebration of Nevermind's twentieth anniversary. The band made a similar EP of covers in 2013 for Nirvana's In Utero called The In Utero Sessions.

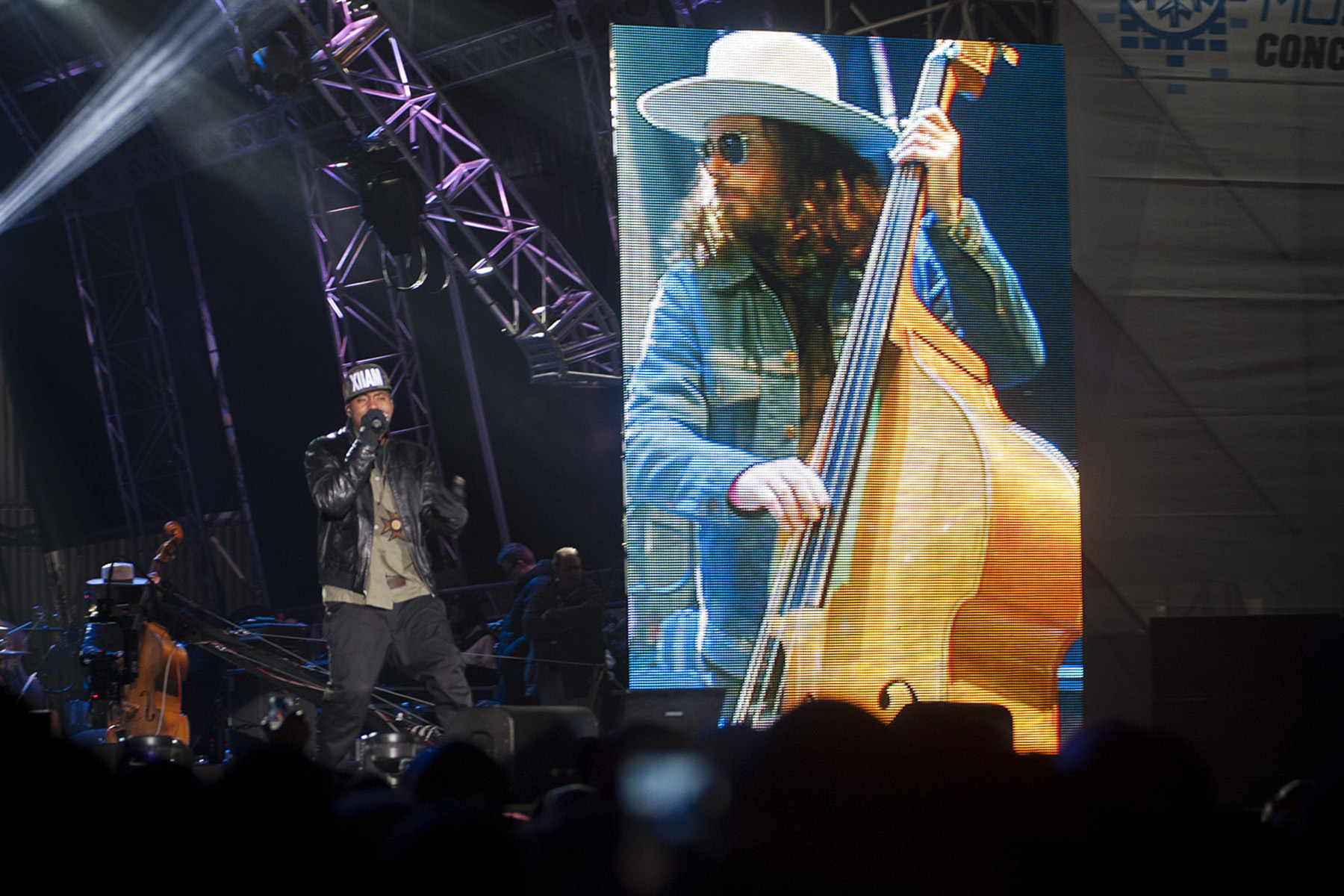
Jingle Punks CEO Jared Gutstadt performing with Nas in Johannesburg, South Africa

In January 2012 the Hipster Orchestra released a medley of hip-hop covers called “4 Strings and an 808.” The medley includes snippets of material from major hip-hop artists including Jay Z and Eminem, as well as a quote from Bruce Hornsby's pop hit “The Way It Is.”

On January 20, 2012, the Hipster Orchestra debuted "Blue Ivy Lullabies," a medley of Jay-Z and Beyoncé tracks performed as a lullaby to the couple's then-newborn daughter Blue Ivy Carter.

On June 7, 2014, the Hipster Orchestra performed with Nas for a Castle Lite-sponsored show in Johannesburg, South Africa.

== Appearances ==
The Hipster Orchestra have played shows in New York at the Soho House and Rockwood Music Hall, in Chicago at Schuba's, and in Los Angeles at the Soho House. Additionally, the Hipster Orchestra has drawn attention from media outlets such as the New York Times for performing in non-traditional venues, specifically the offices of major advertising houses such as Ogilvy and Mather Worldwide (Los Angeles), Wieden and Kennedy (New York), DDB (Chicago), Leo Burnett (Chicago), and Grip (Toronto). In 2014, the band played at Castle Lite's Extra Cold Music concert backing Nas, where they played the rapper's 1994 album Illmatic in its entirety among other songs.

On television, the Hipster Orchestra has made several appearances on NBC's Last Call with Carson Daly.

== Discography ==
- Hipster Dinner Party Vol. 1 (2011)
- The Nirvana Sessions (2011)
- The King of Instruments (w/ Alex Collier) (2012)
- The In Utero Sessions (2013)
