= NUE Agency =

Creative music agency

New Universal Entertainment (NUE) Agency
- Company type: Private
- Founded: New York, New York, United States (2008)
- Headquarters: New York, New York, United States
- Key people: Jesse Kirshbaum, Founder and CEO; Alex Kirshbaum, Partner
- Products: Strategic Marketing, Creative, Lifestyle marketing, Digital Promotion, Public Relations
- Website: www.nueagency.com

Nue Agency is a creative music agency located in New York City. In 2013 they were named to Inc Mag's 500 list as the 3rd fastest growing Media Company.

== History ==
Nue Agency was founded in 2008 by Jesse Kirshbaum who still serves as the company's CEO. Alex Kirshbaum (Jesse's brother) also works for the company.

Nue has acted as an agent for Clipse, Wale, Mike Posner, Chiddy Bang, White Panda, Big Sean, J. Cole, Logic, Capital Cities, Action Bronson, Odd Future, Solange Knowles, Pusha T, Hoodie Allen, and Sound Remedy.

== The Patch ==
Nue Agency is the lead agency for The Patch, and artists' housing program run with Sour Patch Kids. It provides free housing for touring artists in Brooklyn, NY, Austin, TX, and Hollywood, CA. Artists including Zella Day, Conrad Sewell, and Deer Tick (band) have stayed at the homes.

In September 2015, Sour Patch Kids and Nue Agency won a Clio Music award for their work in brand activation with The Patch.

== CRWN ==
NUE produces CRWN, a live interview series hosted by Elliott Wilson. Guests have included Drake, Macklemore, Big Sean, Lil Wayne, R. Kelly, Rick Ross, Nicki Minaj, J. Cole, and T.I.

== SoundCTRL ==
Nue Agency operates SoundCtrl, a publication that covers music and technology. Nue also created and is the executive producer for the FlashFWD awards.
