= Alexis Hoag-Fordjour =

American legal scholar (born 1982)

Alexis Hoag-Fordjour (born 1982) is the David Dinkins '56 Professor of Law and co-director of the Center for Criminal Justice at Brooklyn Law School. Born in Southern California, Hoag-Fordjour is a first-generation Tanzanian-American (Chagga). She received a bachelor's degree from Yale University, and a Juris Doctor degree from NYU School of Law, after which she spent more than a decade working as a civil rights and capital defense attorney at the NAACP Legal Defense and Educational Fund, Inc., and the Office of the Federal Public Defender. Hoag-Fordjour was the inaugural practitioner-in-residence at the Eric H. Holder Jr. Initiative for Civil & Political Rights at Columbia University and a lecturer at Columbia Law School. She served as a law clerk to the late Honorable John T. Nixon of the United States District Court for the Middle District of Tennessee.

Hoag-Fordjour was elected a member of the American Law Institute in 2021. In February 2024, the Constitutional Accountability Center (CAC) announced that it chose Professor Alexis Hoag-Fordjour as its inaugural scholar-in-residence.

In July 2022, Hoag-Fordjour married Derek Fordjour at the Arthur Ross Terrace and Garden at Cooper Hewitt, Smithsonian Design Museum in Manhattan.
