= LaChanze =

American actress (born 1961)

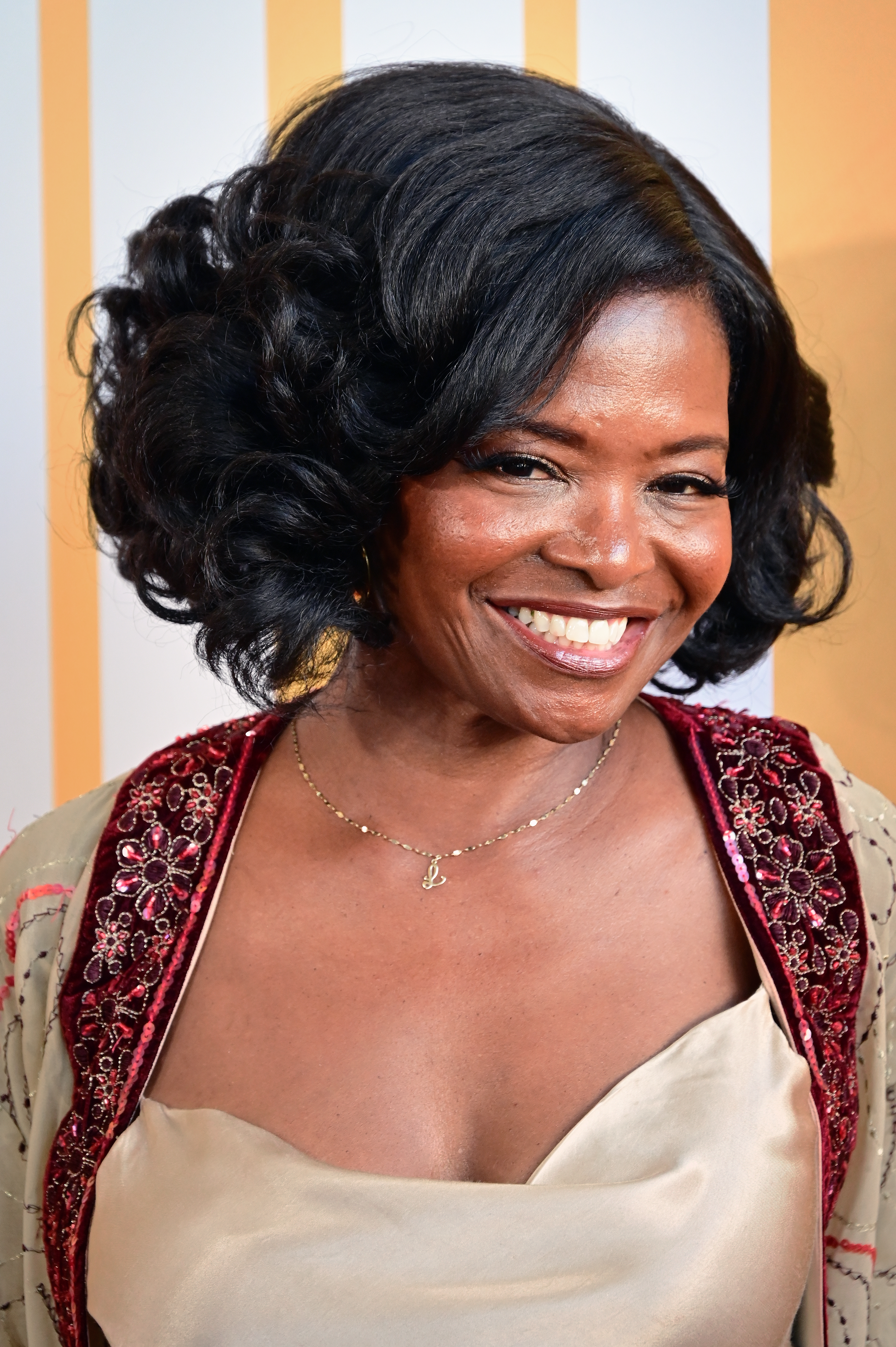
- LaChanze in 2026
- Born: Rhonda LaChanze Sapp; December 16, 1961 (age 64); St. Augustine, Florida, U.S.
- Other names: LaChanze Sapp, La Chanze Sapp-Gooding, R. Lachanze Sapp
- Occupations: Actress, theater producer, singer, dancer
- Years active: 1986–present
- Spouses: Calvin J. Gooding (m. 1998; died 2001) Derek Fordjour (m. 2005; div. 2014)
- Children: 2, including Celia Rose Gooding
- Website: mslachanze.com

LaChanze Sapp-Gooding, known professionally as LaChanze (/ləˈʃɑːnz/; born December 16, 1961), is an American actress, theater producer, singer, and dancer. She won a Tony Award for Best Actress in a Musical in 2006 for her role as Celie Harris Johnson in The Color Purple. LaChanze has subsequently received four more Tony Awards for co-producing Kimberly Akimbo, Topdog/Underdog, The Outsiders, and Purpose.

== Career ==
LaChanze's first summer job was as a tap dancer in the ensemble of Uptown... It's Hot! at the Tropicana Hotel in Atlantic City, New Jersey. The show opened on Broadway in January 1986, where LaChanze began her professional career in the theater.

LaChanze played the role of Ti Moune in the Lynn Ahrens and Stephen Flaherty musical Once on This Island in 1990 and received nominations for the Tony Award as Best Actress in a Featured Role in a Musical at the 45th Tony Awards and the Drama Desk Award as Outstanding Actress in a Leading Role in a Musical. In December 1998, she joined the cast of the Lynn Ahrens, Stephen Flaherty and Terrence McNally Broadway musical Ragtime, replacing Audra McDonald in the role of Sarah. She played the role of Viveca in the Playwrights Horizons Off-Broadway production of the musical The Bubbly Black Girl Sheds Her Chameleon Skin, which opened in June 2000. She received a Drama Desk nomination for Outstanding Actress in a Musical, for her performance. LaChanze participated in an Actors Fund of America benefit concert of Funny Girl, with many performers portraying the character of Fanny Brice, in September 2002.

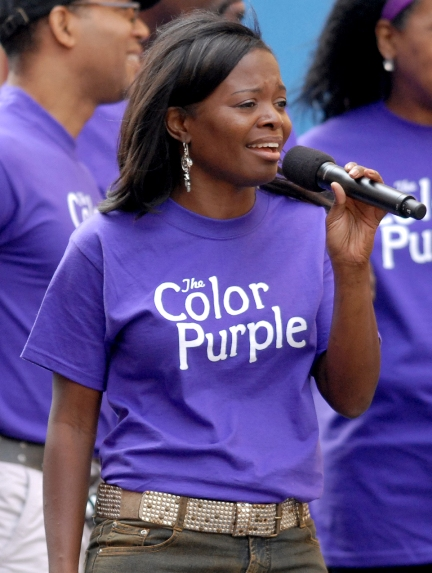
LaChanze performing in 2006

In 2005, LaChanze played Dessa Rose, a runaway slave in the Ahrens and Flaherty musical Dessa Rose. The musical opened Off-Broadway at the Mitzi Newhouse Theatre at Lincoln Center in March 2005. LaChanze received an Obie Award for Distinguished Performance by an Actress for Dessa Rose. LaChanze appeared as Celie Harris Johnson in the Broadway musical The Color Purple, from its opening in 2005 to November 2006. She won the Tony Award for Best Actress in a Leading Role in a Musical for this performance at the 60th Tony Awards.

In September 2008, LaChanze participated in the Boston Pops concert, Handel's Messiah Rocks at Emerson College. The performance was filmed by Public Broadcasting Service. She was in the Off-Broadway production of Inked Baby, written by Christina Anderson, which opened in March 2009 at Playwrights Horizons Peter Jay Sharp Theater. In June and July 2009, she played the role of Glinda in the New York City Center Encores! staged Summer Stars concert production of The Wiz.

LaChanze published her first picture book, Little Diva, in 2010. She was in the Broadway production of If/Then in 2014, starring as Kate. In 2018, she appeared in Summer: The Donna Summer Musical on Broadway, playing Diva Donna/Mary Gaines, for which she received a Tony Award nomination at the 72nd Tony Awards. In 2019, she appeared in A Christmas Carol on Broadway, starring as the Ghost of Christmas Present.

In January 2022, LaChanze took a star turn on Broadway in Trouble in Mind, written by Alice Childress in 1955. She earned a nomination for the Tony Award for Best Actress in a Play nomination for her performance as Wiletta Mayer at the 75th Tony Awards.

In 2022, LaChanze began her career as a Broadway producer. She produced Topdog/Underdog with David Stone, Rashad V. Chambers, Marc Platt, Debra Martin Chase, and the Shubert Organization. She also produced Kimberly Akimbo on Broadway with David Stone, Aaron Glick, Patrick Catullo and James L. Nederlander. She was nominated for the Tony Award for Best Musical and the Tony Award for Best Revival of a Play as a producer for Kimberly Akimbo and Topdog/Underdog on May 2, 2023. She was announced as a winner for both shows during the 76th Tony Awards telecast on June 11, 2023.

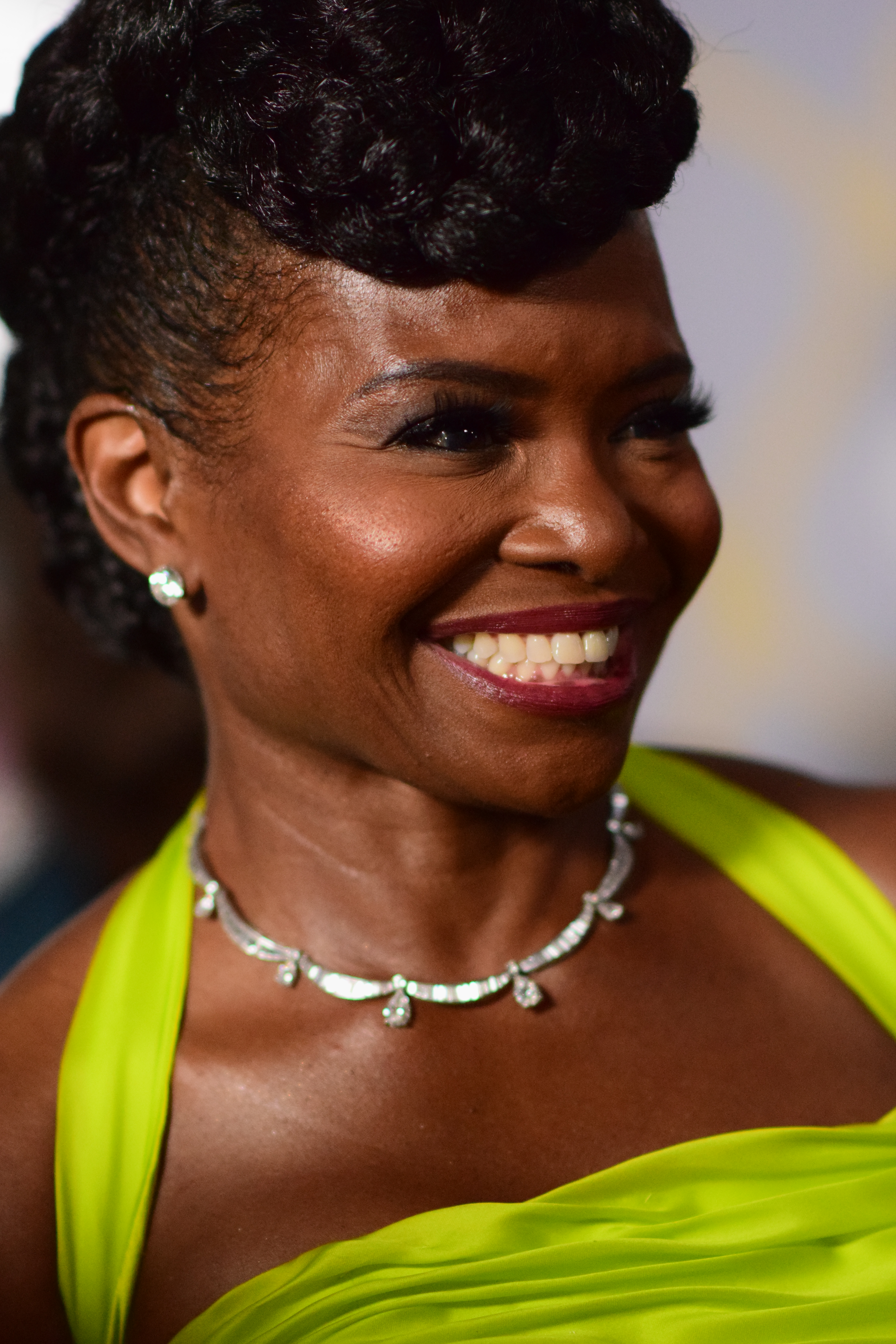
LaChanze at the 2022 Tony Awards

In 2022, she launched Tima Productions with friend and former Ragtime castmate Marylee Fairbanks. Together they co-produced The Outsiders, for which she won another Tony Award for Best Musical at the 77th Tony Awards. She also received a nomination for the Tony Award for Best Play for Jaja's African Hair Brading at the same ceremony. In 2024 she launched a multimedia company called LC Productions.

== Personal life ==
LaChanze married securities trader Calvin Gooding in August 1998, two years after they met. Together they had daughters Celia and Zaya, but when LaChanze was eight months pregnant with Zaya, Calvin was killed in the September 11, 2001 attacks. He had been at work at Cantor Fitzgerald in Tower One of the World Trade Center.

LaChanze remarried in 2005, to Derek Fordjour. They separated in 2013, and finalized their divorce on March 27, 2014, in Westchester County.

On September 6, 2002, LaChanze sang the National Anthem at a joint meeting of Congress in Federal Hall National Memorial, the first meeting of Congress in New York since 1790. On May 15, 2014, she performed "Amazing Grace" at the dedication of the National September 11 Memorial & Museum, in tribute to her late husband.

In 2019, LaChanze and the elder of her two children, Celia Rose Gooding, simultaneously appeared on Broadway, with LaChanze starring in A Christmas Carol and Gooding starring in Jagged Little Pill. The two repeated the rare event of mother and child starring in simultaneous Broadway shows, following Debbie Reynolds and Carrie Fisher in 1983.

== Acting credits ==
Sources:

- The New York Times
- TCM

=== Film ===
| Year | Title | Role | Notes |
|---|---|---|---|
| 1992 | My New Gun | Kelly Jane | |
| 1992 | Leap of Faith | Georgette | |
| 1993 | For Love or Money | Nora | |
| 1997 | David Searching | God Truth | |
| 1997 | Hercules | Terpsichore | Voice role |
| 2002 | Heartbreak Hospital | Lisa | |
| 2006 | Black Sorority Project: The Exodus | —N/a | Executive producer |
| 2009 | Handel's Messiah Rocks | Singer | |
| 2009 | Breaking Upwards | Maggie | |
| 2011 | The Help | Rachel Jefferson | |
| 2013 | Side Effects | Wards Islands Desk Nurse | |
| 2018 | Diane | Jennifer | |
| 2018 | Melinda | Melinda LaCroix | |
| 2018 | Knights in Newark | The Witch/Mrs. Conroy | Short film |
| 2023 | Birth/Rebirth | Colleen | |
| 2023 | Genie | Grandma Patty | |
| 2025 | Highest 2 Lowest | Det. Bell | |
| 2026 | By Any Means | Hattie Dahmer | |

=== Television ===
| Year | Title | Role | Notes |
|---|---|---|---|
| 1988–1989 | The Cosby Show | Sylvia | 2 episodes |
| 1993 | For Love and Glory | Tanzi | Television film |
| 1994 | The Cosby Mysteries | Dr. Weeks | 2 episodes |
| 1996 | New York Undercover | Mariah Barton | Episode: "Tough Love" |
| 1997 | Total Security | Wanda Robitaille | Episode: "Look Who's Stalking" |
| 1998 | Hercules: The Animated Series | Terpsichore (voice) | 19 episodes |
| 1999 | The Gregory Hines Show | Julia | Episode: "Sister-in-Law, Sister-in-Law" |
| 1999 | Hercules: Zero to Hero | Terpsichore (voice) | Television film |
| 1999 | Sex and the City | Hostess | Episode: "Ex and the City" |
| 2000–2022 | Law & Order: Special Victims Unit | Ms. Pivik/Amber/Rosa Freeman | 3 episodes |
| 2003 | Lucy | Harriett | Television film |
| 2011 | One Life to Live | Yvonne Moreau | 3 episodes |
| 2015 | The Battery's Down | TiMoune | Episode: "Reunion" |
| 2016 | Person of Interest | Mona | 2 episodes |
| 2016 | The Night Of | Mrs. Stone | Episode: "Subtle Beast" |
| 2018 | Pinkalicious & Peterrific | Blue Fairy (voice) | Episode: "Fairy House/Pinkabotta & Peterbotta" |
| 2019 | The Village | Wendy Parker | Episode: "Yes or No" |
| 2019–2020 | The Good Fight | Julius' Wife | 2 episodes |
| 2021 | The Blacklist | Anne Foster | 4 episodes |
| 2021 | The Underground Railroad | Ms. Reva | Episode: "Chapter 8: Indiana Autumn" |
| 2022–2023 | East New York | Simone Bentley | 3 episodes |
| 2022–2024 | Firebuds | Jenna Jones (voice) | 11 episodes |
| 2023 | Gossip Girl | Naomi | Episode: "I Am Gossip" |
| 2024 | Dee & Friends in Oz | Grandma / Miss Emerald (voice) | 17 episodes |
| TBA | The Best of Us | | |

=== Theatre ===
| Year | Title | Role | Venue | Notes |
|---|---|---|---|---|
| 1985 | Uptown... It's Hot! | Tap Dancer | Tropicana Hotel, Atlantic City | |
| 1986 | Uptown... It's Hot! | Tap Dancer | Lunt-Fontanne Theatre, Broadway | Broadway debut |
| 1987 | Dreamgirls | Ensemble | Ambassador Theatre, Broadway | (u/s Deena Jones, Michelle Morris) |
| 1990 | Once on This Island | Ti Moune | Playwrights Horizons, Off-Broadway | |
| 1990–1991 | Once on This Island | Ti Moune | Booth Theatre, Broadway | |
| 1991 | From the Mississippi Delta | Various | Cincinnati Playhouse, Cincinnati | |
| 1995 | Spunk | Missy Mae/Delia | John W. Huntington Theatre, Hartford | |
| 1995 | Out of This World | Chloe | New York City Center Encores! | |
| 1995 | Company | Marta | Criterion Center Stage Right, Broadway | |
| 1996 | Comfortable Shoes | Performer | Paper Mill Playhouse, Millburn | |
| 1997 | Ragtime | Sarah | Shubert Theatre, Los Angeles | |
| 1998 | Ragtime | Sarah | Meridian Arts Centre | |
| 1998 | Ragtime | Sarah | Nederlander Theatre | |
| 1999 | The Vagina Monologues | Performer | Westside Theatre, Off-Broadway | |
| 1999–2000 | Ragtime | Sarah | Ford Center for the Performing Arts. Broadway | Replacement |
| 2000 | The Bubbly Black Girl Sheds Her Chameleon Skin | Viveca | Playwrights Horizons, Off-Broadway | |
| 2002 | Funny Girl | Fanny Brice | New Amsterdam Theatre, Broadway | New York Actor's Benefit Fund Concert |
| 2002 | Once on This Island | Ti Moune | Winter Garden Theatre, Broadway | Broadway reunion concert |
| 2004 | The Color Purple | Celie Harris Johnson | Alliance Theatre, Atlanta | Out-of-town tryout |
| 2004 | Baby | Pam | Paper Mill Playhouse, Millburn | |
| 2005 | Dessa Rose | Dessa Rose | Mitzi E. Newhouse Theatre, Off-Broadway | |
| 2005–2006 | The Color Purple | Celie Harris Johnson | Broadway Theatre, Broadway | |
| 2009 | Inked Baby | Performer | Playwrights Horizons, Off-Broadway | |
| 2009 | The Wiz | Glinda | New York City Center Encores! | |
| 2012 | Handel's Messiah Rocks: A Joyful Noise | Performer | National tour | |
| 2013 | If/Then | Kate | National Theatre, Washington, D.C. | Out-of-town tryout |
| 2014–2015 | If/Then | Kate | Richard Rodgers Theatre, Broadway | |
| 2015–2016 | If/Then | Kate | National tour | |
| 2016 | Cabin in the Sky | Wanda | New York City Center Encores! | |
| 2017 | Summer: The Donna Summer Musical | Diva Donna/Mary Gaines | La Jolla Playhouse, La Jolla | Out-of-town tryout |
| 2018 | Summer: The Donna Summer Musical | Diva Donna/Mary Gaines | Lunt-Fontanne Theatre, Broadway | |
| 2019 | The Secret Life of Bees | August Boatwright | Atlantic Theater Company, Off-Broadway | |
| 2019 | A Christmas Carol | Ghost of Christmas Present / Mrs. Fezziwig | Lyceum Theatre, Broadway | |
| 2021 | Trouble in Mind | Wiletta | American Airlines Theatre, Broadway | |
| 2024 | Gutenberg! The Musical! | Producer | James Earl Jones Theatre, Broadway | One night only |
| 2026 | Romeo & Juliet | Lady Capulet | Delacorte Theatre | |

=== Video games ===
| Year | Title | Role |
|---|---|---|
| 1997 | Hercules | Terpsichore |

== Discography ==
- Once On This Island (Original Broadway Cast Recording), 1990
- Disney's Princess Favorites, featured artist, 2002
- Dessa Rose (off-Broadway Cast Recording), 2005
- The Color Purple (Original Broadway Cast Recording), 2006
- Disney Collection 1, featured artist, 2006
- The Bubbly Black Girl Sheds Her Chameleon Skin (Studio Cast Recording), 2007
- Handel's Messiah Rocks: A Joyful Noise, featured artist, 2009
- Nice Fighting You: A 30th Anniversary Celebration Live at 54 Below, featured on four songs, 2014
- If/Then (Original Broadway Cast Recording), 2014
- Summer: The Donna Summer Musical (Original Broadway Cast Recording), 2018

== Concerts ==
- September 6, 2002 - Federal Hall National Memorial
- 2008 - Handel's Messiah Rocks, Emerson College
- Dec 1 & 2, 2008 - Joe's Pub
- December 5, 2010 - Playhouse Square Center
- December 16, 2012 - Birdland
- May 15, 2014 - National September 11 Memorial and Museum
- February 13, 2015 - Kennedy Center
- 2016/17 - Feeling Good Tour

== Accolades ==
| Year | Award | Category | Nominated work | Result |
|---|---|---|---|---|
| 1991 | Theatre World Award | Outstanding Broadway Debut | Once on This Island | Won |
| 1991 | Tony Award | Best Performance by a Featured Actress in a Musical | Once on This Island | Nominated |
| 1991 | Drama Desk Award | Outstanding Actress in a Musical | Once on This Island | Nominated |
| 2001 | Drama Desk Award | Outstanding Actress in a Musical | The Bubbly Black Girl Sheds Her Chameleon Skin | Nominated |
| 2005 | Drama Desk Award | Outstanding Actress in a Musical | Dessa Rose | Nominated |
| 2005 | Obie Award | Performance | Dessa Rose | Won |
| 2006 | Tony Award | Best Performance by a Leading Actress in a Musical | The Color Purple | Won |
| 2006 | Broadway.com Audience Award | Favorite Actress in a Musical | The Color Purple | Won |
| 2006 | Broadway.com Audience Award | Favorite Diva Performance | The Color Purple | Won |
| 2006 | Broadway.com Audience Award | Favorite Onstage Pair (w/ Elisabeth Withers) | The Color Purple | Nominated |
| 2010 | Chicago / Midwest Emmy Award | Outstanding Achievement for Individual Excellence on Camera: Programming – Performer | Handel's Messiah Rocks | Won |
| 2014 | Broadway.com Audience Award | Favorite Actress in a Supporting Role in a Musical | If/Then | Won |
| 2018 | Tony Award | Best Performance by a Leading Actress in a Musical | Summer: The Donna Summer Musical | Nominated |
| 2018 | Drama Desk Award | Outstanding Actress in a Musical | Summer: The Donna Summer Musical | Nominated |
| 2019 | AUDELCO Awards | Lead Actress in a Musical | The Secret Life of Bees | Won |
| 2020 | Lucille Lortel Awards | Outstanding Lead Actress in a Musical | The Secret Life of Bees | Nominated |
| 2020 | Drama Desk Award | Outstanding Featured Actress in a Musical | The Secret Life of Bees | Nominated |
| 2020 | Antonyo Awards | Best Actor in a Leading Role in a Musical Off-Broadway | The Secret Life of Bees | Won |
| 2020 | Antonyo Awards | Best Actor in a Leading Role in a Play on Broadway | A Christmas Carol | Nominated |
| 2022 | Tony Award | Best Performance by a Leading Actress in a Play | Trouble in Mind | Nominated |
| 2022 | Outer Critics Circle Awards | Outstanding Actress in a Play | Trouble in Mind | Won |
| 2022 | Drama League Award | Distinguished Performance Award | Trouble in Mind | Nominated |
| 2023 | Tony Award | Best Musical | Kimberly Akimbo | Won |
| 2023 | Tony Award | Best Revival of a Play | Topdog/Underdog | Won |
| 2024 | Tony Award | Best Musical | The Outsiders | Won |
| 2024 | Tony Award | Best Play | Jaja's African Hair Braiding | Nominated |
| 2025 | Tony Award | Best Musical | Buena Vista Social Club | Nominated |
| 2025 | Tony Award | Best Play | Purpose | Won |
| 2026 | Tony Award | Best Revival of a Musical | Cats: The Jellicle Ball | Nominated |
