= Summer: The Donna Summer Musical =

2017 musical

- 2018 Broadway Playbill
- Music: Various
- Lyrics: Various
- Book: Colman Domingo; Robert Cary; Des McAnuff
- Basis: The life of Donna Summer
- Premiere: November 7, 2017: La Jolla Playhouse
- Productions: 2017 La Jolla Playhouse; 2018 Broadway; 2019 First National Tour; 2021 Second National Tour; 2022 NCL 1.0

Summer: The Donna Summer Musical is a jukebox musical with book by Colman Domingo, Robert Cary, and Des McAnuff and music and lyrics Donna Summer, Giorgio Moroder, Pete Bellotte, Paul Jabara, and others, based on the life of Summer.

The musical made its premiere at the La Jolla Playhouse in November 2017 and opened on Broadway in April 2018.

== Productions ==
The La Jolla Playhouse presented the musical in a limited engagement from November 7 until December 24, 2017.

The musical premiered on Broadway at the Lunt-Fontanne Theatre on March 28, 2018 (previews), prior to an April 23, 2018 opening. The musical is directed by Des McAnuff, with scenic design by Robert Brill, costumes by Paul Tazewell, lighting by Howell Binkley, projections by Sean Nieuwenhuis, sound by Gareth Owen, and was produced by Tommy Mottola and Thalía. The musical closed on Broadway on December 30, 2018, after 289 performances.

The First National tour opened September 29, 2019. The tour started at the RBTL Auditorium in Rochester, New York. The cast featured Dan’yelle Williamson (Diva Donna), Alex Hairston (Disco Donna), and Olivia Elease Hardy (Duckling Donna).

The Second National Tour opened November 15, 2021. Launching at the Benedum Center in Pittsburgh, PA. The cast featured Brittny Smith (Diva Donna), Charis Gullage (Disco Donna), and Amahri Edward-Jones (Duckling Donna).

In July 2022, Norwegian Cruise Line announced its at-sea tour of the musical aboard the all new Norwegian Prima, which premiered in August. The cast features Kimberley Locke (Diva Donna), Valerie Curlingford (Disco Donna), and D'Nasya Jordan (Duckling Donna).

Broadway Licensing acquired the rights for all future stock and amateur performances.

== Overview ==
The musical highlights Donna Summer at three stages of her life. Duckling Donna is in her pre-teens, starting out in Boston; Disco Donna, in her late teens and 20s, has her initial success; Diva Donna is in her 50s and at the top of her career.

== Musical numbers ==
- The Queen Is Back – Diva Donna and Ensemble
- I Feel Love – Diva Donna and Ensemble
- Love to Love You Baby – Disco Donna and Female Ensemble
- I Remember Yesterday – Duckling Donna and Sisters
- On My Honor – Duckling Donna
- Faster and Faster to Nowhere – Disco Donna and Ensemble
- Munich: Jesu, Joy of Man's Desiring / White Boys / Love to Love You Baby (Reprise) – Diva Donna, Disco Donna and Ensemble
- MacArthur Park – Diva Donna, Disco Donna, Duckling Donna and Ensemble
- Heaven Knows – Disco Donna and Bruce Sudano
- No More Tears (Enough Is Enough) – Diva Donna, Disco Donna and Duckling Donna
- Pandora's Box – Duckling Donna, Diva Donna and Ensemble
- On the Radio – Disco Donna and Diva Donna
- I Love You – Bruce Sudano, Disco Donna and Mimi Sudano
- Bad Girls – Disco Donna and Female Ensemble
- She Works Hard for the Money – Full Company
- Dim All the Lights – Disco Donna, Joyce Bogart and Ensemble
- I Believe in Jesus – Disco Donna and Ensemble
- Unconditional Love – Diva Donna, Mimi, Brooklyn and Amanda Sudano
- To Turn the Stone – Disco Donna and Diva Donna
- Stamp Your Feet – Diva Donna and Ensemble
- Friends Unknown – Diva Donna
- Hot Stuff – Disco Donna and Ensemble
- Last Dance – Diva Donna, Disco Donna, Duckling Donna and Full Company

== Cast ==
Character	La Jolla (2017)	Broadway (2018)	First National Tour (2019–2020)	Second National Tour (2021–2022)	NCL 1.0 (2022–2023)
Diva Donna / Mary Gaines	LaChanze	LaChanze	Dan'yelle Williamson	Brittny Smith	Kimberley Locke
Disco Donna	Ariana DeBose	Ariana DeBose	Alex Hairston	Charis Gullage	Valerie Curlingford
Duckling Donna / Mimi Sommer	Storm Lever	Storm Lever	Olivia Elease Hardy	Amahri Edwards-Jones	D'Nasya Jordan
Giorgio Moroder	Mackenzie Bell	Kaleigh Cronin	Kyli Rae	Robert Ayla	Brooke Lacy
Young Dara Gaines / Amanda Sudano	Kimberly Dodson	Kimberly Dodson	Cameron Anika Hill	Ciara Jones	Ta'kaiyah Bailey
Adult Mary Ellen Bernard	Anissa Felix	Anissa Felix	DeQuina Moore	Mia Davidson	Candace Washington
Brian	Drew Foster	Drew Foster	Jay Garcia (Note: Also played Helmuth)	David Tanciar	Jonny Rouse
Maid / Michael (Note: Role split in national tour)	Afra Hines	Afra Hines	Brittany Nicole Williams/Candace J. Washington	Diane Meck	Eloise Simpson
Neil Bogart	Aaron Krohn	Aaron Krohn	John Gardiner	Chris Lewis	Dan Evans
Norm Brokaw (Note: Role split for national tour)	Jenny Laroche	Jenny Laroche	Tamrin Goldberg	Francisco Risso	Tym Brown
Mary Ellen Gaines / Brooklyn Sudano	Wonu Ogunfowora	Wonu Ogunfowora	De'Ja Simone	Meridien Terrell	Isabella Mason
Bob	Rebecca Riker	Rebecca Riker	Brooke Lacy	Francisco Risso	N/A
Adult Dara Gaines	Christina Acosta Robinson	Christina Acosta Robinson	Crystal Sha'nae	Layla Tompkins	Eve Parsons
Andrew Gaines	Ken Robinson	Ken Robinson	Erick Pinnick	Porter Lee Anderson	Tym Brown
Joyce Bogart	Jessica Rush	Jessica Rush	Trish Lindström	Aubrey Young	Reagan Muir
Pete Bellotte	Kaye Tuckerman	Kaye Tuckerman	Jennifer Byrne	Emiliee Theno	Molly Scott
Bruce Sudano	Jared Zirilli	Jared Zirilli	Steven Grant Douglas	John Guragna	Tyler Burk
Pastor / Doctor	Jenny Laroche	Harris M. Turner	Sir Brock Warren	Lamont Whitaker	Anthony Garcia
Helmuth Sommer	Drew Foster	Drew Foster	Jay Garcia	Francisco Risso	Jonny Rouse
Don Engel	Kaye Tuckerman	Kaye Tuckerman	Jennifer Byrne	David Tanciar	Oliver Selwood
David Geffen	Mackenzie Bell	Mackenzie Bell	Brooke Lacy	Robert Ayla	James Vinson
Detective	Drew Foster	Mackenzie Bell	Brooke Lacy	Emiliee Theno	James Vinson
Swings	Drew Foster, Aurelia Michael, Jody Reynard, Kim Steele	Drew Foster, Aurelia Michael, Jody Reynard, Kim Steele	Jo'nathan Michael, Jennifer Wolfe, Mara Lucas	Stephen Vaught, Kayleigh Hegarty, Nissi Shalome	Nichole Ford, Michael Marrero

== Awards and nominations ==
=== Original Broadway production ===
Year	Award Ceremony	Category	Nominee	Result
2018	Chita Rivera Awards	Outstanding Female Dancer in a Broadway Show	Ariana DeBose	Won
2018	Drama League Awards	Outstanding Production of a Musical		Nominated
2018	Drama League Awards	Distinguished Performance	Ariana DeBose	Nominated
2018	Drama League Awards	Distinguished Performance	LaChanze	Nominated
2018	Tony Awards	Best Actress in a Musical	LaChanze	Nominated
2018	Tony Awards	Best Featured Actress in a Musical	Ariana DeBose	Nominated
