= SoundCtrl =

Music and technology blog

- Website type: Blog
- Owner: NUE Agency
- Founder: Jesse Kirshbaum
- Website: soundctrl.com
- Launched: 2009
- Current status: Active

SoundCtrl is a blog based in New York City aimed at covering developments in music and technology. The site features reviews of mobile music apps, interviews with industry professionals, and provides coverage of music tech events. SoundCtrl was founded in 2009 by Jesse Kirshbaum (CEO, NUE Agency)

SoundCtrl also hosts regular music tech networking events, panels, and keynotes. Past panels have featured Bob Lefsetz, Nick Jonas, Asher Roth, Maura Johnston, Talib Kweli, Junior Sanchez, and Steve Stoute, among others.

== FlashFWD Awards ==
Each year, SoundCtrl hosts the FlashFWD Awards, an annual awards show to honor individuals or organizations breaking ground in music and technology. Recently, the event has been held at New York City's Gramercy Theatre.

Past winners include:

- Scott Snibbe
- Spotify
- BandPage
- Scooter Braun
- Square (application)
- Soundtracking
- Creators Project
- SoundCloud
- Troy Carter
- The Echo Nest
- Indaba
- RockDex
- Hype Machine
- Big Live
- Jingle Punks Music
