= Derek Fordjour =

American artist

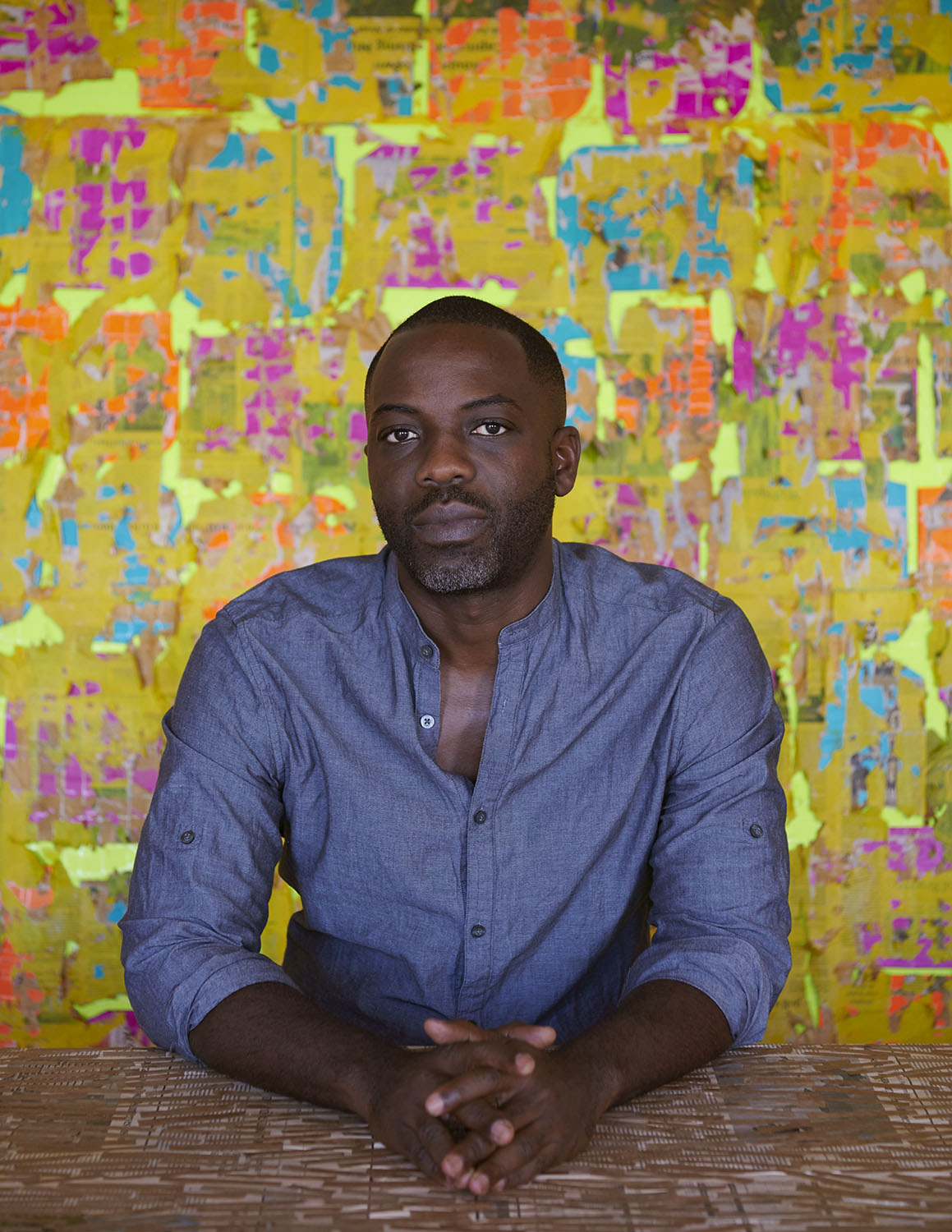
- Born: 1974 (age 51–52); Memphis, Tennessee, U.S.
- Education: Morehouse College, Harvard University, Hunter College
- Occupations: Artist; educator
- Spouses: LaChanze Sapp-Gooding (m. 2005; div. 2014) Alexis Hoag (m. 2022)

Derek Fordjour (born 1974) is an American interdisciplinary artist and educator of Ghanaian heritage who works in collage, video/film, sculpture, and painting. Fordjour lives and works in New York City.

== Early life and education ==
Derek Fordjour was born in 1974 in Memphis, Tennessee. His parents were both Ghanaian immigrants.

Fordjour received an MFA from Hunter College, an Ed. M in Arts Education from Harvard University, and a B.A. from Morehouse College. Fordjour is a member of the Alpha Phi Alpha fraternity. He was commissioned by Alpha Phi Alpha to create a portrait entitled An Experiment in Brotherhood to commemorate the founding of the fraternity.

== Career ==
He was appointed the Alex Katz Chair at Cooper Union in spring 2020, and since 2018 he has served as a core critic at Yale University School of Art.

In 2014, Fordjour was working with sports imagery in his art, which served as metaphors for inequality.

In 2020, his series of artworks in the exhibition titled "Shelter" were created during the self-quarantine period due to the COVID-19 pandemic. The works in "Shelter" examined the privileges of security as well as confinement.

In 2021, the artist had a solo exhibition at Pond Society in Shanghai, China, where his paintings looked at the gamification of social structures and vulnerability. In these paintings, Fordjour incorporated layers of the Financial Times. On his use of the paper in his practice, Fordjour explained in Ocula Magazine: 'The Financial Times is making an effort to differentiate itself from the pool of other newsprints with its distinctive color. The idea of individuation—the desire to distinguish oneself in the face of being stereotyped or grouped—has a tension that I identify with.'

His work has been exhibited in numerous venues, including the Contemporary Art Museum in St. Louis (2020), the Nasher Museum of Art (2019), and the Whitney Museum of Contemporary Art (2018–2019). He has received commissions for public projects, including a permanent installation for the Metropolitan Transit Authority of New York City at 145th Street Subway Station, and the Whitney Museum Billboard Project in 2018.

== Personal life ==
Fordjour married LaChanze Sapp-Gooding in 2005. They separated in 2013, and finalized their divorce on March 27, 2014, in Westchester County.

In July 2022, Fordjour married Alexis Hoag-Fordjour at the Arthur Ross Terrace and Garden at Cooper Hewitt, Smithsonian Design Museum in Manhattan.

== Awards, honors, and collections ==
He was awarded the 2016 Sugarhill Museum Artist-in-Residence, the 2017 Sharpe Walentas Studio Program in New York City, and the 2018 Deutsche Bank NYFA Fellowship Award.

His work appears in several public and private collections, including the Studio Museum in Harlem, Brooklyn Museum, Pérez Art Museum Miami Dallas Museum of Art, the Whitney Museum, and the Los Angeles County Museum of Art.

== Select exhibitions ==
- 2020, 'SELF MUST DIE', Petzel Gallery, New York, NY
- 2020, 'SHELTER', Contemporary Art Museum of St. Louis, St. Louis, MO
- 2019: 'The House Always Wins', Josh Lilley, London, UK
- 2019: 'JRRNNYS', Night Gallery, Los Angeles, CA
- 2018 'Half Mast', the Whitney Museum of American Art, New York, NY
- 2018: 'Derek Fordjour: Camelot Study', BAM, Brooklyn, NY
- 2018 'Ritual', Nina Johnson Gallery, Miami, FL
- 2017 'PARADE', Sugar Hill Museum, New York, NY
- 2016: 'Agency and Regulation', LUCE Gallery, Turin, Italy
- 2016: 'Eight Paintings', Papillion Art, Los Angeles, CA
- 2015 'UPPER ROOM', Robert Blumenthal Gallery, New York, NY

== Selected press and reviews ==
- Hyperallergic, "Derek Fordjour Conjures a Heavenly World", Seph Rodney, December 16, 2020
- T: The New York Times Style Magazine, "Marching to..." T Magazine, November 27, 2020
- New York Times, "Derek Fordjour, From Anguish...", Siddhartha Mitter, November 19, 2020
- ARTNews, "Best Practices: Derek Fordjour...", Andy Battaglia, November 10, 2020
- Financial Times, "Derek Fordjour on painting...", Jackie Wullschlager, October 20, 2020
- Elephant Magazine, "Derek Fordjour Uses Sport...", Emily Steer, October 16, 2020
- Artsy, "Derek Fordjour Honors Disenfranchised...", Jacqui Germain, June 3, 2020
- Financial Times, "Painting crowds, or the lack...", Jackie Wullschläger, May 8, 2020
- Hyperallergic, "Derek Fordjour Considers...", Jack Radley, April 6, 2020
- Artforum, "Critics Pick: Derek Fordjour: Shelter", Jennifer Piejko, January 2020
- St. Louis Post Dispatch, "Beyond white walls...", Jane Henderson, January 17, 2020
- Financial Times, "Four exhibitions bring African...", Jackie Wullschlager, 2019
- Artnews, "Petzel Gallery Now Represents Derek...", Annie Armstrong, 2019
- Galerie, "The rising-star artist uses imagery of carnivals...", Lucy Rees, 2019
- Cultured, "Artist Derek Fordjour Revels in The Game...", Jennifer Piejko, 2019
- Los Angeles Times, "Datebook: Paintings of...", Carolina A. Miranda, 2019
- The Wall Street Journal, "'I Don't Want to Be a Blip...", Kelly Crow, 2019
- Artnet News, "8 Art Advisors Tell Us Which Artists...", Henri Neuendorf, 2018
- Culture Type, "Historic Bequest: Late Arts...", Victoria L. Valentine, Oct, 10 2018
- Artnet News, "Price Check! Here's What Sold...", artnet News, October 9, 2018
- Hyperallergic, "Studio Museum in Harlem...", Jasmine Weber, October 8, 2018
- Artnews, "Even as Brexit Looms, Galleries...", Judd Tully, October 3, 2018
- Gotham, "6 Innovators Shaping...", The Editors, October 1, 2018
- Juvenile Justice, "Arts-centered New York...", Shay Urbani, May 25, 2018
- Hyperallergic, "Wandering the Artists...", Seph Rodney, May 5, 2018
- Surface, "Best of Zona Maco 2018", Brooke Porter Katz, February 11, 2018
- Artsy, "What Sold at Zona Maco", Anna Louie Sussman, February 11, 2018
- Hyperallergic, "The Political Truths...", Seph Rodney, February 9, 2018
- The Art Newspaper, "Art Los...", Maxwell Williams, January 31, 2018
- Artnet News, "How Artist Derek Fordjour...", Sarah Cascone, December 18, 2017
- Hyperallergic, "A Dreamy Carnival...", Seph Rodney, November 22, 2017
- The Undefeated, "The Portrait of an Artist...", Kelley D. Evans, October 6, 2017
- Galerie Magazine, "Derek Fordjour's Immersive...", Jacqueline Terrebonne, August 2, 2017
- Vice, "Sports Are a Metaphor for Inequality...", Francesca Capossela, June 21, 2017
- Los Angeles Times, "And There is an End...", David Pagel, March 21, 2016
- Los Angeles Times, "Derek Fordjour: Eight Paintings.." by Carolina Miranda, February 4, 2016
- Observer, "Nine Overachieving New Yorkers You Must Date", February 3, 2016
- New York Times, "From Derek Fordjour..." by Holland Cotter, November 19, 2015
- Los Angeles Times, "And There is an End.." by David Pagel, March 21, 2015
- The Brooklyn Rail, Review of 'The Big Game'.. by Johnathan Goodman, October 7, 2014
- Ebony, "Artist Derek Fordjour has a Lesson for...,", by Souleo, September 29, 2014
- Huffington Post, "The Sports World Could Learn..." by Souleo, 2014
- MSNBC's TheGrio.com, "40 Amazing Black Artists to Watch in 2014", January 3, 2014
