= 72nd Tony Awards =

2018 US theatrical awards ceremony

- Official poster
- Date: June 10, 2018
- Location: Radio City Music Hall, New York, New York
- Hosted by: Sara Bareilles; Josh Groban

Highlights
- Most wins: The Band's Visit (10)
- Most nominations: Mean Girls and SpongeBob SquarePants (12)
- Website: tonyawards.com

Television/radio coverage
- Network: CBS
- Viewership: 6.3 million
- Produced by: Ricky Kirshner; Glenn Weiss
- Directed by: Glenn Weiss

The 72nd Annual Tony Awards were held on June 10, 2018, to recognize achievement in Broadway productions during the 2017–18 season. The ceremony was held at Radio City Music Hall in New York City, and was broadcast live by CBS. Sara Bareilles and Josh Groban served as hosts.

The Band's Visit was the most winning production of the season, with 10 awards, including Best Musical, Best Actor in a Leading Role in a Musical for Tony Shalhoub, Best Actress in a Leading Role in a Musical for Katrina Lenk, and Best Actor in a Featured Role in a Musical for Ari'el Stachel. Harry Potter and the Cursed Child won six awards, including Best Play, while Angels in America won three, including Best Revival of a Play.

The ceremony received positive reviews, with many highlighting the performances of Bareilles and Groban as hosts. At the 71st Primetime Emmy Awards, it was nominated for four awards Outstanding Variety Special (Live), Outstanding Technical Direction, Camerawork, Video Control for a Limited Series, Movie, or Special, Outstanding Lighting Design / Lighting Direction for a Variety Special and Outstanding Original Music and Lyrics.

== Eligibility ==
The official eligibility cut-off date for Broadway productions opening in the 2017–2018 season was April 26, 2018.

Original plays

- 1984
- The Children
- Farinelli and the King
- Harry Potter and the Cursed Child
- John Lithgow: Stories by Heart
- Junk
- Latin History for Morons
- Meteor Shower
- The Parisian Woman
- The Terms of My Surrender

Original musicals

- The Band's Visit
- Escape to Margaritaville
- Frozen
- Mean Girls
- Prince of Broadway
- SpongeBob SquarePants
- Summer: The Donna Summer Musical

Play revivals

- Angels in America
- Children of a Lesser God
- The Iceman Cometh
- Lobby Hero
- M. Butterfly
- Marvin's Room
- Saint Joan
- Three Tall Women
- Time and the Conways
- Travesties

Musical revivals

- Carousel
- My Fair Lady
- Once on This Island

Notes

- In November 2017, the Broadway production of 1984, which ran from May 18 through October 8, 2017 at the Hudson Theatre, was deemed ineligible for competition at the 72nd Tony Awards. In April 2018, the Tony Awards Administration Committee reversed its decision and allowed 1984 to be considered for nominations.

== Awards events ==
=== Nominations ===
The Tony Award nominations were announced on May 1, 2018 by Hamilton alum Leslie Odom Jr. and Katharine McPhee, who was starring in Waitress on Broadway at the time.

Mean Girls and SpongeBob SquarePants each received 12 nominations, tying as the most-nominated shows of the season. The Band's Visit received 11 nominations, as did the revivals of Angels in America and Carousel. Harry Potter and the Cursed Child and the Lincoln Center Theater revival of My Fair Lady each received ten nominations.

Angels in America broke the record for most nominations for a play in Tony Awards history with 11 nominations, beating the record previously held by 2007's The Coast of Utopia and the 2010 revival of Fences.

=== Other events ===
The annual Meet the Nominees Press Reception took place on May 2, 2018, at the InterContinental New York Hotel. The annual Nominees Luncheon took place on May 22, 2018, at the Rainbow Room. A cocktail party was held on June 4, 2018, at the Sofitel New York Hotel to celebrate the season's Tony Honors for Excellence in the Theatre and Special Award recipients.

=== Creative Arts Awards ===
The Creative Arts Tony Awards were presented prior to the televised ceremony. The hosts are Brandon Victor Dixon and Marissa Jaret Winokur. This ceremony presents awards in technical categories and several previously announced special awards.

== Ceremony ==
=== Presenters ===
The ceremony's presenters included:

- Rachel Bloom – backstage presenter
- Kerry Washington – presented Best Actor in a Play
- Tina Fey – introduced Mean Girls
- Carey Mulligan – presented Best Featured Actress in a Play
- Amy Schumer – introduced My Fair Lady
- Billy Joel – presented Special Tony Award to Bruce Springsteen
- Tituss Burgess – presented Best Featured Actress in a Musical
- Ethan Slater – introduced SpongeBob SquarePants
- Erich Bergen and Katharine McPhee – presented Best Book of a Musical
- Tatiana Maslany – presented Best Featured Actor in a Play
- Mikhail Baryshnikov – introduced Carousel
- Uzo Aduba – presented Best Featured Actor in a Musical
- Ming-Na Wen – presented Excellence in Theatre Education Award
- Matthew Morrison – introduced Marjory Stoneman Douglas High School drama department
- Patti LuPone – special presentation on the Tonys' history
- Claire Danes – presented Best Actress in a Play
- James Monroe Iglehart – introduced Frozen
- Chita Rivera and Andrew Lloyd Webber – presented Best Direction of a Musical
- Jeff Daniels – presented Best Direction of a Play
- Christopher Jackson – presenter of the In Memoriam tribute
- Amanda Sudano, Brooklyn Sudano, and Mimi Sommer – introduced Summer: The Donna Summer Musical
- Matt Bomer, Jim Parsons, Zachary Quinto, Andrew Rannells – presented Best Play
- Melissa Benoist – introduced Once on This Island
- John Leguizamo – presented Best Revival of a Play
- Rachel Brosnahan – introduced The Band's Visit
- Brandon Victor Dixon and Marissa Jaret Winokur – presenters of the Creative Arts winners
- Christine Baranski – presented Best Revival of a Musical
- Robert De Niro – introduced Bruce Springsteen
- Kelli O'Hara – presented Best Actor in a Musical
- Leslie Odom Jr. – presented Best Actress in a Musical
- Bernadette Peters – presented Best Musical

=== Performances ===
The following shows and individuals performed on the ceremony's telecast:

- "This One's for You" – Sara Bareilles and Josh Groban
- "Where Do You Belong?" / "Meet the Plastics" – Mean Girls
- "The Rain in Spain" / "I Could Have Danced All Night" / "Get Me to the Church on Time" – My Fair Lady
- "Bikini Bottom Day" (with new lyrics) / "I'm Not a Loser" – SpongeBob SquarePants
- "8 Times a Week" (parody of "Chandelier" by Sia) – Bareilles and Groban
- "Blow High, Blow Low" – Carousel
- "Seasons of Love" – Marjory Stoneman Douglas High School drama department
- "For the First Time in Forever" / "Let It Go" – Frozen
- Chita Rivera and Andrew Lloyd Webber medley – Bareilles and Groban
- "For Forever" – Dear Evan Hansen
- "Last Dance" – Summer: The Donna Summer Musical
- "One Small Girl" / "Mama Will Provide" – Once on This Island
- "Omar Sharif" – The Band's Visit
- "My Hometown" – Bruce Springsteen
- "This One's for the Dreamers" – Bareilles and Groban

== Non-competitive awards ==
The Tony Award for Lifetime Achievement in the Theatre was presented to Chita Rivera and Andrew Lloyd Webber.

The Tony Honors for Excellence in Theatre was awarded to photographer Sara Krulwich, costume beader Bessie Nelson, and Broadway dry cleaning service Ernest Winzer Cleaners.

The Excellence in Theatre Education Award was presented to Melody Herzfeld of Marjory Stoneman Douglas High School.

The Isabelle Stevenson Award was presented to Nick Scandalios, who is the Executive Vice President of the Nederlander Organization.

The Regional Theatre Tony Award was awarded to La MaMa E.T.C. (Experimental Theatre Club) of New York City, which has a monetary grant of $25,000.

The Special Tony Award was given to John Leguizamo and Bruce Springsteen.

== Winners and nominees ==
Best Play ‡	Best Musical ‡
Harry Potter and the Cursed Child - Jack Thorne; The Children - Lucy Kirkwood; Farinelli and the King - Claire van Kampen; Junk - Ayad Akhtar; Latin History for Morons - John Leguizamo	The Band's Visit; Frozen; Mean Girls; SpongeBob SquarePants
Best Revival of a Play ‡	Best Revival of a Musical ‡
Angels in America; The Iceman Cometh; Lobby Hero; Three Tall Women; Travesties	Once on This Island; Carousel; My Fair Lady
Best Performance by a Leading Actor in a Play	Best Performance by a Leading Actress in a Play
Andrew Garfield – Angels in America as Prior Walter; Tom Hollander – Travesties as Henry Carr; Jamie Parker – Harry Potter and the Cursed Child as Harry Potter; Mark Rylance – Farinelli and the King as Philip V of Spain; Denzel Washington – The Iceman Cometh as Theodore "Hickey" Hickman	Glenda Jackson – Three Tall Women as A; Condola Rashad – Saint Joan as Joan of Arc; Lauren Ridloff – Children of a Lesser God as Sarah Norman; Amy Schumer – Meteor Shower as Corky
Best Performance by a Leading Actor in a Musical	Best Performance by a Leading Actress in a Musical
Tony Shalhoub – The Band's Visit as Tewfiq Zakaria; Harry Hadden-Paton – My Fair Lady as Henry Higgins; Joshua Henry – Carousel as Billy Bigelow; Ethan Slater – SpongeBob SquarePants as SpongeBob SquarePants	Katrina Lenk – The Band's Visit as Dina; Lauren Ambrose – My Fair Lady as Eliza Doolittle; Hailey Kilgore – Once on This Island as Ti Moune; LaChanze – Summer: The Donna Summer Musical as Diva Donna / Mary Gaines; Taylor Louderman – Mean Girls as Regina George; Jessie Mueller – Carousel as Julie Jordan
Best Performance by a Featured Actor in a Play	Best Performance by a Featured Actress in a Play
Nathan Lane – Angels in America as Roy Cohn; Anthony Boyle – Harry Potter and the Cursed Child as Scorpius Malfoy; Michael Cera – Lobby Hero as Jeff; Brian Tyree Henry – Lobby Hero as William; David Morse – The Iceman Cometh as Larry Slade	Laurie Metcalf – Three Tall Women as B; Susan Brown – Angels in America as Hannah Pitt, Ethel Rosenberg, et al.; Noma Dumezweni – Harry Potter and the Cursed Child as Hermione Granger; Deborah Findlay – The Children as Hazel; Denise Gough – Angels in America as Harper Pitt
Best Performance by a Featured Actor in a Musical	Best Performance by a Featured Actress in a Musical
Ari'el Stachel – The Band's Visit as Haled; Norbert Leo Butz – My Fair Lady as Alfred P. Doolittle; Alexander Gemignani – Carousel as Enoch Snow; Grey Henson – Mean Girls as Damian Hubbard; Gavin Lee – SpongeBob SquarePants as Squidward Tentacles	Lindsay Mendez – Carousel as Carrie Pipperidge; Ariana DeBose – Summer: The Donna Summer Musical as Disco Donna; Renée Fleming – Carousel as Nettie Fowler; Ashley Park – Mean Girls as Gretchen Wieners; Diana Rigg – My Fair Lady as Mrs. Higgins
Best Direction of a Play	Best Direction of a Musical
John Tiffany – Harry Potter and the Cursed Child; Marianne Elliott – Angels in America; Joe Mantello – Three Tall Women; Patrick Marber – Travesties; George C. Wolfe – The Iceman Cometh	David Cromer – The Band's Visit; Michael Arden – Once on This Island; Tina Landau – SpongeBob SquarePants; Casey Nicholaw – Mean Girls; Bartlett Sher – My Fair Lady
Best Book of a Musical	Best Original Score (Music and/or Lyrics) Written for the Theatre
Itamar Moses – The Band's Visit; Jennifer Lee – Frozen; Tina Fey – Mean Girls; Kyle Jarrow – SpongeBob SquarePants	David Yazbek – The Band's Visit; Adrian Sutton – Angels in America; Kristen Anderson-Lopez and Robert Lopez – Frozen; Jeff Richmond and Nell Benjamin – Mean Girls; The Composers of SpongeBob SquarePants (Note: The nominated composers for SpongeBob SquarePants were Yolanda Adams, Steven Tyler & Joe Perry, Sara Bareilles, Jonathan Coulton, Alex Ebert, The Flaming Lips, Lady Antebellum, Cyndi Lauper & Rob Hyman, John Legend, Panic! at the Disco, Plain White T's, They Might Be Giants, T.I., Domani and Lil'C.)
Best Scenic Design of a Play	Best Scenic Design of a Musical
Christine Jones – Harry Potter and the Cursed Child; Miriam Buether – Three Tall Women; Jonathan Fensom – Farinelli and the King; Santo Loquasto – The Iceman Cometh; Ian MacNeil and Edward Pierce – Angels in America	David Zinn – SpongeBob SquarePants; Dane Laffrey – Once on This Island; Scott Pask – The Band's Visit; Scott Pask, Finn Ross, and Adam Young – Mean Girls; Michael Yeargan – My Fair Lady
Best Costume Design of a Play	Best Costume Design of a Musical
Katrina Lindsay – Harry Potter and the Cursed Child; Jonathan Fensom – Farinelli and the King; Nicky Gillibrand – Angels in America; Ann Roth – Three Tall Women; Ann Roth – The Iceman Cometh	Catherine Zuber – My Fair Lady; Gregg Barnes – Mean Girls; Clint Ramos – Once on This Island; Ann Roth – Carousel; David Zinn – SpongeBob SquarePants
Best Lighting Design of a Play	Best Lighting Design of a Musical
Neil Austin – Harry Potter and the Cursed Child; Paule Constable – Angels in America; Peggy Eisenhauer and Jules Fisher – The Iceman Cometh; Paul Russell – Farinelli and the King; Ben Stanton – Junk	Tyler Micoleau – The Band's Visit; Kevin Adams – SpongeBob SquarePants; Peggy Eisenhauer and Jules Fisher – Once on This Island; Donald Holder – My Fair Lady; Brian MacDevitt – Carousel
Best Sound Design of a Play	Best Sound Design of a Musical
Gareth Fry – Harry Potter and the Cursed Child; Adam Cork – Travesties; Ian Dickinson – Angels in America; Tom Gibbons – 1984; Dan Moses Schreier – The Iceman Cometh	Kai Harada – The Band's Visit; Mike Dobson and Walter Trarbach – SpongeBob SquarePants; Peter Hylenski – Once on This Island; Scott Lehrer – Carousel; Brian Ronan – Mean Girls
Best Choreography	Best Orchestrations
Justin Peck – Carousel; Christopher Gattelli – My Fair Lady; Christopher Gattelli – SpongeBob SquarePants; Steven Hoggett – Harry Potter and the Cursed Child; Casey Nicholaw – Mean Girls	Jamshied Sharifi – The Band's Visit; John Clancy – Mean Girls; Tom Kitt – SpongeBob SquarePants; Annmarie Milazzo and Michael Starobin – Once on This Island; Jonathan Tunick – Carousel

‡ The award is presented to the producer(s) of the musical or play.

± The Tony Awards for Best Sound Design of a Play and of a Musical were reinstated for the 72nd Tony Awards after being removed in 2014.

=== Awards and nominations per production ===
Production	Nominations	Awards
Mean Girls	12	0
SpongeBob SquarePants	12	1
Angels in America	11	3
The Band's Visit	11	10
Carousel	11	2
Harry Potter and the Cursed Child	10	6
My Fair Lady	10	1
The Iceman Cometh	8	0
Once on This Island	8	1
Three Tall Women	6	2
Farinelli and the King	5	0
Travesties	4	0
Frozen	3	0
Lobby Hero	3	0
The Children	2	0
Junk	2	0
Summer: The Donna Summer Musical	2	0
Children of a Lesser God	1	0
Latin History for Morons	1	0
Meteor Shower	1	0
1984	1	0
Saint Joan	1	0

==== Individuals with multiple nominations ====
- 3: Ann Roth
- 2: Peggy Eisenhauer and Jules Fisher; Jonathan Fensom, Christopher Gattelli, Casey Nicholaw, Scott Pask and David Zinn

== Reception ==
The show received a positive reception from many media publications. On Metacritic, the ceremony has a weighted average score of 79 out of 100, based 5 reviews, indicating "generally favorable reviews". The Hollywood Reporter columnist David Rooney remarked, "Bareilles and Groban aced their duties on their own terms, displaying terrific chemistry and making it less about themselves than their infectious enthusiasm as out-and-proud theater geeks." The New York Times theatre critic Mike Hale commented, "The just-happy-to-be-here, can't-we-all-get-along vibe was set by the opening song, a celebration of the ceremony's also-rans — 'This one's for the loser inside of you' — sung by the hosts, Sara Bareilles and Josh Groban, and a chorus made up of ensemble members from every Broadway musical. It was a charming, if not particularly memorable, number. That could also describe the performances of Ms. Bareilles and Mr. Groban, who were a likable and entertaining pair. The show as a whole ran like clockwork, without any significant gaffes but also no particularly memorable outbreaks of emotion or eccentricity." Daniel D'Addario from Variety wrote, "Throughout, Groban and Bareilles kept up this happily effervescent, optimistic but never cloying energy — up until the show's end, when they reprised their opening number as a call to arms for all who work in the theater, or hope to. It was a sweet debut performance by hosts who may well be back at Radio City next June, should the Tonys be so lucky."

In addition, Kristen Baldwin from Entertainment Weekly gave the show a B+, expanding in her review, "Hosts Josh Groban and Sara Bareilles kicked off the 72nd annual Tony Awards with the mix of showmanship, self-deprecating humor, and good-natured egalitarianism that would continue throughout the night." Deadline Hollywood critic Dino-Ray Ramos commented, "Bareilles and Groban live on the border of radio-friendly music and the Broadway stage, and they served as delightful cruise directors, devoid of forced jokes and corny antics. Instead, they leaned into their musical theater geekiness, which was infectious. As a hosting duo, they did their job effortlessly and well, staying in their lane by not doing too much or too little. They were pitch perfect — pun intended." Television critic Jessica Gelt of the Los Angeles Times remarked, "hosts Josh Groban and Sara Bareilles leavened the evening with well-measured comedy."

=== Ratings ===
The ceremony averaged a Nielsen 4.8 ratings/11 share, and was watched by 6.3 million viewers. The ratings was a 5 percent increase from previous ceremony's viewership of 6 million, becoming the highest since 2016.

== In Memoriam ==
The cast of Dear Evan Hansen sang "For Forever" as images of theatre personalities who had died in the past year were shown.

- Barbara Cook
- Thomas Meehan
- John "Corky" Boyd
- Nanette Fabray
- Patricia Morison
- Frank Corsaro
- Danny Daniels
- Gemze de Lappe
- Roy Dotrice
- Michael Friedman
- Peter Hall
- A. R. Gurney
- John Heard
- Earle Hyman
- Albert Innaurato
- Stephen J. Albert
- John Mahoney
- Mark Schlegel
- Rachel Rockwell
- John Heyman
- Donald McKayle
- David Ogden Stiers
- Soon-Tek Oh
- Bernard Pomerance
- Harvey Schmidt
- Sam Shepard
- Liz Smith
- Richard Wilbur
- Louis Zorich
- Joseph Bologna
- Sammy Williams
- Stuart Thompson
- Robert Guillaume
- Jan Maxwell

== See also ==
- Drama Desk Awards
- 2018 Laurence Olivier Awards – equivalent awards for West End theatre productions
- Obie Award
- New York Drama Critics' Circle
- Theatre World Award
- Lucille Lortel Awards
