= Jenny Laroche =

American actress, singer

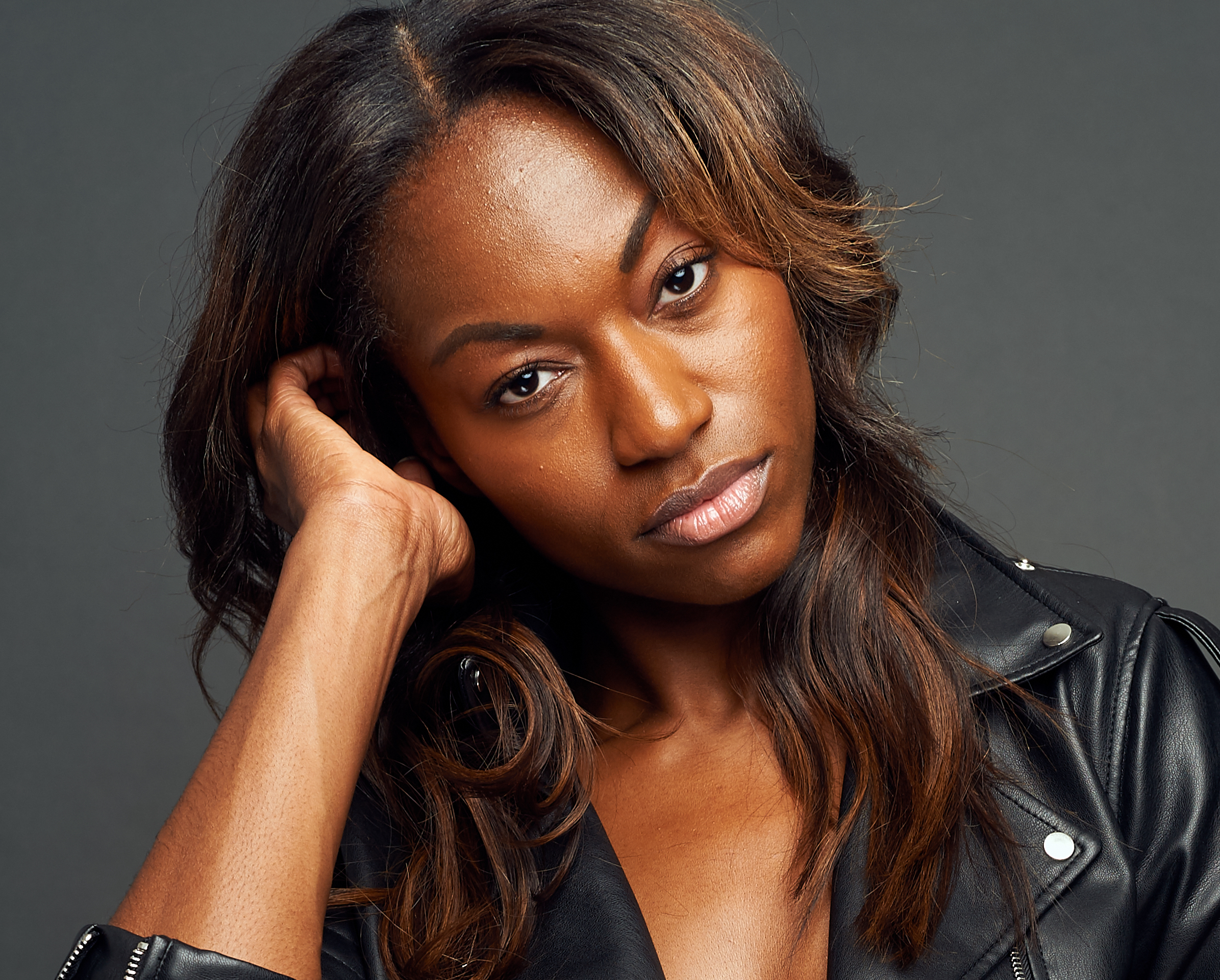

Jenny Laroche is an American actress, dancer, singer, and choreographer who has made appearances on the stage, on television, and in film.

Laroche is best known for playing Sue on the NBC musical drama series Smash

== Life and career ==
Jenny Laroche was born in Fort Lauderdale, Florida to a large Haitian family. As a child, she studied piano, gymnastics, and dance, and took part in local dance competitions. She completed her B.F.A. at the State University of New York at Buffalo in 2008, an experience she says allowed her to progress as an artist and expand her creativity.

Laroche began her professional career as a center girl with The Rockettes dance company at Radio City Music Hall, where she performed for four seasons. In 2012, she earned a recurring role as Sue on the series Smash, which ran for two seasons.

In 2014, Laroche (mezzo-soprano) sang in the Metropolitan Opera's production of the operetta The Merry Widow She also appeared in a one-night performance of Guys and Dolls at Carnegie Hall. The following year, in 2015, she appeared on stage again in the Broadway musical Paint Your Wagon. A review in Vulture magazine noted the "terrific can-can led by Jenny Laroche, who’s a Rockette, is unusually strong throughout." Laroche was a member of the ensemble in the Rodgers and Sondheim musical Do I Hear a Waltz. More recently, she served as the assistant choreographer in Mariah Carey's "All I Want for Christmas Is You" show at the Beacon Theatre in New York.
