= Jingle Punks Music =

Music licensing company

- Type: LLC
- Industry: music publishing, production music
- Founded: 2008
- Founders: Jared Gutstadt; Dan Demole
- Headquarters: New York City
- Area served: Worldwide
- Services: Music composition, music licensing
- Number of employees: 60
- Parent: Anthem Entertainment
- Website: www.jinglepunks.com

Jingle Punks Music is a music publishing and licensing company headquartered in New York, NY, founded by Jared Gutstadt and Dan Demole in October 2008. The company provides original and licensed music for television, film, video games, and advertisements.

== History ==
The company began as a self-funded startup company based out of the Lower East Side apartment of co-founder Jared Gutstadt in New York City. He met co-founder Dan Demole at a The Black Keys concert. The company officially launched in October 2008. Soon after, they partnered with former E-Town Concrete singer and music manager Anthony Martini to increase their catalog of artists. Within months of launching the company, they released their platform, "The Jingle Player." The Player is a proprietary, patented technology that provides targeted music selection with a searchable interface.

In July 2009, they became music providers for both Viacom and Bravo TV networks.

In April 2010, Jingle Punks launched their West Coast offices with offices following in Toronto and London. Early notice came from CNN and Variety. Jingle Punks was named Pepsi/SoundCtrl Leading Innovator in the Music Technology Industry at South by Southwest 2010 (SXSW).

Shortly after returning from SXSW 2010, Jingle Punks completed equity financing and established its strategic advisory board. The funding was sponsored by Third Prime Capital out of New York with an advisory board that included tech and music industry veterans like former Last.fm COO Spencer Hyman, who observed "To me, the Jingle Punks approach represents the future of music discovery and music licensing."

In October 2010, Jingle Punks became the first music supervision application approved for the iPad. The release was met with a wave of positive press including coverage from CNET, Digital Music News, Cult of Mac, and Mashable.

In November, 2010, Jingle Punks was heavily involved in the launch of Top Gear USA, which featured a track with Poison singer, Bret Michaels. The collaboration was the first project to be launched from the Jingle Punks internal creative services arm. Since then, Jingle Punks went on to compose and provide catalogue music on notable shows such as NBC's The Voice, ABC's The Taste, Real Housewives of Atlanta, and American Pickers. Jingle Punks received ASCAP Film & TV Awards in 2010, 2011, 2012, 2013, and 2014 for scoring The Voice, as well as their theme song for Pawn Stars, composed by Gutstadt. In 2013, Gutstadt co-wrote and produced a new theme for Pawn Stars with Lynyrd Skynyrd. The company has also worked with Nas, Dierks Bentley, Matt & Kim, Bret Michaels, Debbie Gibson, Stacy Keach, Kris Kristofferson, and Snow.

Jingle Punks' first foray into the brand partnership realm was with Viacom subsidiary Black Entertainment Television (BET) and was announced February 18, 2011 in Variety. The unique partnership between BET and Jingle Punks helped to create a cohesive urban music library, the first ever assembled for the media licensing space.

In 2011, Jingle Punks created an eight-piece string ensemble called The Jingle Punks Hipster Orchestra, an in-house chamber group intended as a multi-genre marketing and artistic tool. The group's releases include The Nirvana Sessions, a covers album of songs from Nirvana's Nevermind album, created at the request of Publisher Primary Wave Music for the 20th anniversary of the album's initial release. Hipster Dinner Party, Vol. 1 featured covers of songs by artists such as Vampire Weekend, MGMT, The Strokes, and The Black Keys. The group's third release, The King Of Instruments, features South Carolina-based organist Alex Collier and was released in the fall of 2012. In November 2011, both Jingle Punks and the Hipster Orchestra were highlighted in The New York Times after performing in the offices of leading agencies such as Wieden + Kennedy and Ogilvy & Mather Worldwide.

Jingle Punks has also been featured in The Wall Street Journal, USA Today, Business Insider, Fast Company, the Toronto Star, Forbes, and Bloomberg Businessweek.

In late 2012, talent agency William Morris Endeavor acquired a majority stake in Jingle Punks, aiming to cultivate synergies across their music and entertainment verticals.

On March 23, 2015, Jingle Punks was acquired by Ole Media Management.
