= Audio Up Media =

Podcast network and production studio

- Type: Private
- Industry: Music and entertainment
- Founded: 2020, United States
- Founder: Jared Gutstadt
- Headquarters: Los Angeles, California
- Website: https://www.audioup.com/

Audio Up Media is a podcast studio and network in Los Angeles, California, founded in 2020 by Jared Gutstadt. Its collaborators include Stephen King, James Ellroy, Machine Gun Kelly, Michael Cohen, Anthony Anderson, Miranda Lambert, JaVale McGee Maejor, Anna Delvey, and Jason Alexander.

The majority of podcasts are scripted musicals with original scores. "We start with the songs and then we build the stories around them," Gutstadt says.

In 2020, Gutstadt was awarded Adweek's "Podcast Innovator of the Year" and "Podcast Producer of the Year."

Investors include The Weeknd, Wassim “Sal” Slaiby, Larry Rudolph, Entertainment One CEO Darren Throop, producer Will Ward, and Howard Draft, as well as media companies SiriusXM, MGM/Amazon, Primary Wave and Reservoir Media

== History ==
In 2019, Gutstadt conceived the idea for podcast studio while recording Bear and a Banjo with Jason "Poo-Bear" Boyd.
