= Benjamin Rauhala =

American music director

Benjamin Rauhala is an American music director, arranger, and producer best known for his work in Broadway and cabaret. He is the co-creator and host of the concert series "Broadway Princess Party", which has toured internationally with leading Broadway performers, and he produced the long-running "Broadway Loves" series at New York's 54 Below. On Broadway, Rauhala has worked on productions including "Fiddler on the Roof" (2016) and "American Psycho". He has also co-founded competitions for emerging songwriters and served as music director for high-profile events such as the 2024 American Theatre Wing Gala.

== Early life and education ==
Rauhala holds a Master's Degree in Orchestral Conducting from the University of Central Florida, and a Bachelor's Degree in Piano and Percussion from the University of Massachusetts Amherst.

== Career ==
Rauhala made his Broadway debut in 2016, playing in the pit for Fiddler on the Roof. At the same time, he was the copyist for American Psycho.

Rauhala is the co-creator of the Broadway Princess Party series, touring around the country with celebrated actresses like Susan Egan, Jodi Benson, Christy Altomare, Aisha Jackson, and Krysta Rodriguez. Rauhala narrates the show as the "Fairy Godprince." The concert series began in 2018.

In 2019, Rauhala co-founded "Write Out Loud" with Taylor Louderman, a competition for emerging songwriters.

In 2024, Rauhala was the music director for the American Theatre Wing Gala.

Rauhala produces the 'Broadway Loves' series at 54 Below, a cabaret-style performance where celebrated theatre performers cover songs by a well-known artist.

== Personal life ==
Rauhala is friends with Ariana DeBose; before DeBose hosted the Tony Awards in 2022, he posted a picture of them getting dressed up to sneak into afterparties in 2014.
