= Marty Kupersmith =

American musician (born 1941)

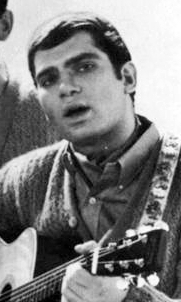
- Sanders in 1963

Background information
- Also known as: Marty Sanders, Marty Joe Kupersmith
- Born: Martin Joseph Kupersmith; February 28, 1941 (age 85); New York City, New York, U.S.
- Genres: Pop; rock; doo-wop; blue-eyed soul
- Occupations: Singer; guitarist; songwriter
- Instruments: Vocals; guitar
- Years active: 1960s–present
- Member of: Jay and the Americans
- Formerly of: The Two Chaps

Martin Joseph Kupersmith (born February 28, 1941), also known professionally as Marty Sanders and Marty Joe Kupersmith, is an American singer, guitarist, and songwriter best known as a longtime member of the vocal group Jay and the Americans. As a performer, he was part of the group's most commercially successful era during the 1960s and early 1970s, contributing vocals and guitar work to hits including "Come a Little Bit Closer", "Cara Mia", and "This Magic Moment".

Kupersmith is also an accomplished songwriter whose credits include collaborations with artists such as Joan Jett, Doc Pomus, Dr. John, and Gerry Goffin. He is notably credited as a co-writer of Joan Jett's 1981 anthem "Bad Reputation".

== Early life ==
Kupersmith was born in New York City on February 28, 1941. Before joining Jay and the Americans, he performed in New York-area groups including The Empires.

== Career ==
=== Jay and the Americans ===
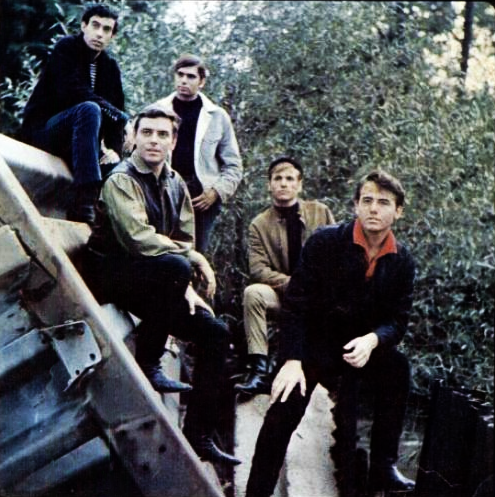
Sanders (top centre) with Jay and the Americans in 1965

In 1962, Kupersmith joined Jay and the Americans, adopting the stage name Marty Sanders. According to the band's official history, he had already been touring with the group and playing on their debut LP before officially becoming a member. He also helped bring vocalist David Blatt from his band the Empires into the group, who subsequently became known as Jay Black in order to stick with the "Jay and the Americans" title.

During the 1960s, Jay and the Americans became one of the leading American vocal groups of the era, scoring hits with songs such as "She Cried", "Only in America", "Come a Little Bit Closer", "Cara Mia", and "Let's Lock the Door (And Throw Away the Key)". Kupersmith contributed guitar, harmony vocals, and songwriting to the group during its peak years.

The group appeared as one of the opening acts for The Beatles during their first United States concert appearance on February 11, 1964.

The original Jay and the Americans disbanded in 1973. Sanders was inducted, as a member of the Americans, into the Vocal Group Hall of Fame in 2002. In 2006, after the rights to the group's name were acquired by founding member Sandy Deanne, Kupersmith reunited with Deanne and Howie Kane for a revived touring version of Jay and the Americans.

In 2017, "Come a Little Bit Closer", a hit for Jay and the Americans in 1964, was featured in the soundtrack for Guardians of the Galaxy Vol. 2. The soundtrack album went gold in the U.S. and sold more than 2.5 million copies worldwide.

Sanders has performed as a vocalist and guitarist on every record by Jay and the Americans made to date with the exception of their first few singles. With the new version of the band formed in 2006, they have released four studio albums: 'Til The End of Time (2010), Sweeter Than Wine (2010), Keepin' the Music Alive (2011), and 45 RPM (2015).

=== Songwriting and Solo work ===
Following the breakup of the original lineup in the 1970s, Kupersmith continued working in music as both a songwriter and performer. In 1971, he sang lead vocals on the title track to the soundtrack of the film You've Got to Walk It Like You Talk It or You'll Lose That Beat, which was produced by Jay and the Americans member Kenny Vance.

Outside of his work as a performer, Kupersmith established a parallel career as a songwriter. Writing under both Marty Sanders and Marty Joe Kupersmith, he collaborated with numerous notable musicians and songwriters.

His best-known songwriting credit is the co-writing of "Bad Reputation" with Joan Jett. The song became one of Jett's signature recordings and a defining anthem of early 1980s rock music.

Kupersmith also co-wrote the international hit song "Words", which became widely known through the 1982 recording by French singer F. R. David.

Kupersmith also co-wrote songs with collaborators including Doc Pomus, Dr. John, Gerry Goffin, Bobby Bloom, Thomas Jefferson Kaye, and members of Jay and the Americans. His songwriting work extended across pop, rock, doo-wop, and blue-eyed soul styles.

In 1996, Kupersmith released the solo album It'll Come to You, which was co-produced by Thomas Jefferson Kaye.

== Legacy ==
Kupersmith's career spans more than six decades as both a recording artist and songwriter. Through his work with Jay and the Americans and his songwriting collaborations, he has remained connected to multiple eras of American popular music, from 1960s vocal pop through 1980s rock.

== Sources ==
- Robustelli, Anthony (2017). Steely Dan FAQ: All that's Left to Know about this Elusive Band. Milwaukee, WI: Backbeat Books. ISBN 9781495025129.
