= American Dreams =

American drama television series

- Genre: Drama
- Created by: Jonathan Prince
- Developed by: Josh Goldstein & Jonathan Prince
- Starring: Brittany Snow; Tom Verica; Gail O'Grady; Will Estes; Sarah Ramos; Ethan Dampf; Jonathan Adams; Arlen Escarpeta; Vanessa Lengies; Rachel Boston
- Country of origin: United States
- Original language: English
- No. of seasons: 3
- No. of episodes: 61

Production
- Executive producers: Jonathan Prince; Dick Clark
- Producer: Mark Grossan (Season 1)
- Running time: 60 minutes
- Production companies: Once a Frog Productions; Dick Clark Productions; Universal Network Television and NBC Studios (seasons 1–2); NBC Universal Television Studio (season 3)

Original release
- Network: NBC
- Release: September 29, 2002 – March 30, 2005

American Dreams is an American drama television series that ran on NBC for three seasons and 61 episodes, from September 29, 2002, to March 30, 2005. The show tells the story of the Pryor family of Philadelphia during the mid-1960s, with many plotlines around teenager Meg Pryor (Brittany Snow), who dances on Dick Clark's American Bandstand. The show often featured contemporary musicians performing as popular musicians of the 1960s. Season one takes place in 1963–1964, season two in 1964–1965 and season three in 1965–1966.

The series was created by Jonathan Prince and developed by Josh Goldstein and Prince; the latter was also one of the executive producers with Dick Clark. It debuted on September 29, 2002, and initially aired on Sundays at 8:00 pm Eastern Time but moved to the same time on Wednesdays from March 9, 2005, to the third-season finale (March 30, 2005). The show was known as Our Generation when it debuted in Australia but was changed back to American Dreams when it returned for the second season.

The theme song "Generation" was written and performed by Emerson Hart, lead singer of the band Tonic. The song earned Hart an ASCAP award for Best Theme Song of Television in 2003. The show was the 2003 TV Land Awards "Future Classic" winner.

== Series overview ==
In 1963 Philadelphia, the Pryors are a close Irish American Catholic family. World War II veteran John "Jack" Pryor owns a television and radio store. He and his homemaker wife Helen have four children: High school senior and football player John "JJ" Pryor, Jr., younger sisters Meg and Patty, and younger brother Will, who is lame from polio. Jack employs Henry Walker, whose son Sam is among the few African-American students at East Catholic High School. Meg and her best friend, Roxanne, pass the audition to dance on camera for Dick Clark's American Bandstand, filmed in the city, while JJ hopes to win a football scholarship to play for the Notre Dame Fighting Irish. The show depicts historical events, such as the assassination of John F. Kennedy, 1964 Philadelphia race riot, and American involvement in—and opposition to—the Vietnam War.

The rest of history plays out exactly like real life. The main difference is that American Bandstand did not move to Los Angeles in early 1964 but instead stayed in Philadelphia contrary to the real life events of the show.

Season	Episodes	Originally released	
Season	Episodes	First released	Last released
1	25	September 29, 2002	May 18, 2003
2	19	September 28, 2003	April 4, 2004
3	17	September 26, 2004	March 30, 2005

== Cast and characters ==
=== Main ===
- Brittany Snow as Margaret "Meg" Pryor: The show's protagonist. In her spare time, she dances on Dick Clark's American Bandstand. Her family is Catholic.
- Tom Verica as John J. "Jack" Pryor: Meg's father and head of the household. He owns Pryor's TV and Radio Store. Later represented his district on the Philadelphia City Council.
- Gail O'Grady as Helen Pryor: Jack's wife. Stay-at-home mom who tries college and then later works for a travel agency.
- Will Estes as John J. "JJ" Pryor Jr.: The oldest Pryor child. He enlists in the United States Marine Corps and fights in the Vietnam War.
- Sarah Ramos as Patricia "Patty" Pryor: Meg's younger sister. Very book smart and acts like a know-it-all.
- Ethan Dampf as William "Will" Pryor: The youngest Pryor child whose leg was crippled by polio, which is a source of guilt for his parents as they refused to allow him to have the Salk vaccine. In the show's second season, his leg was repaired from an experimental surgery.
- Jonathan Adams as Henry Walker: An African American employee in Jack's store who later became a partner in the store, who also heads a family.
- Arlen Escarpeta as Samuel "Sam" Walker: Henry's son and Meg's good friend who becomes a romantic interest in Season 3.
- Vanessa Lengies as Roxanne Bojarski: Meg's best friend who has a knack for getting herself into trouble. She dances on American Bandstand with Meg.
- Rachel Boston as Elizabeth "Beth" Mason-Pryor: JJ's girlfriend, whom he marries in the third season after returning from Vietnam. They have an infant son "Trip".

=== Recurring ===
- Matthew John Armstrong as Pete Pryor: Jack's younger brother, an officer with the Philadelphia Police Department. He is assigned to the Columbia Avenue Precinct in North Philadelphia, a precinct which includes the Walkers' home and the Pryors' second store. He is addicted to alcohol and gambling. Almost married in Season 2 to Nancy (Helen's coworker and friend), but calls off the wedding at the last minute.
- Christopher Cousins as Theodore "Ted" Pryor: Jack and Pete's older brother, a successful businessman who has a strained and distant relationship from the rest of the family. He is only seen in a couple of episodes, and dies in a car accident late in Season 3.
- Natalie Marston as Melissa Pryor: Ted's 18-year-old daughter, niece of Jack and Pete. She entered Vassar College in the fall of 1966.
- John J. "Trip" Pryor III: JJ and Beth's son, born in November 1965 during the third season.
- Adina Porter as Gwen Walker: Henry's wife and a housekeeper, who died in Season 2 of cancer.
- Aysia Polk as Angela Walker: Henry and Gwen's daughter, roughly Patty's age.
- Keith Robinson as Nathan Walker: Henry's outspoken nephew. Spent some time in jail; eventually rehabilitated himself and now operates a delivery service.
- Jamie Elman as Luke Foley: A record store clerk. Meg's boyfriend in the first season; after they broke up, Luke and Roxanne developed a relationship and began living together in the third season.
- Jesse Hutch as James "Jimmy" Riley: An American Bandstand dance partner of Meg's who eventually leaves to fight in Vietnam; he would later return to American Dreams in the second season, in a wheelchair.
- Samuel Page as Drew Mandel: A college student at the University of Pennsylvania; he and Meg date during the show, despite both her brother J.J. and her father's dislike for Drew. It ends when she catches him cheating on her.
- Johnny Lewis as Leonard "Lenny" Beeber: Roxanne's second-season boyfriend with whom she goes on tour. Head of the band Lenny and the Pilgrims.
- Milo Ventimiglia as Christopher "Chris" Pierce: Shelly Pierce's son, who becomes Meg's new love interest in the third season.
- Rodney Scott as Daniel "Danny" O'Connor: Quarterback of the East Catholic football team in the first season, and who has a short-lived relationship with Meg in season two. His older brother was declared missing in action in Vietnam. In season three, Danny's brother's body is found in Vietnam.
- Paul Wasilewski as Thomas "Tommy" DeFelice: JJ's macho friend and former football teammate. JJ later ends the friendship when he notices a strong racist side to him when Sam enrolls at East Catholic. They resume their friendship when Tommy takes the blame for something JJ did.
- Kevin Sheridan as Kenny Keegan: JJ's East Catholic friend and teammate; a mediocre athlete.
- Jessica Collins as Colleen: JJ's coworker and sometime girlfriend in season one; she is older than JJ and a divorcée.
- Joseph Lawrence as Michael Brooks: The original floor producer of American Bandstand. His character left after the show's first season.
- Michael E. Rodgers as Colin: Floor producer of Bandstand who took over after Michael Brooks' departure.
- Peter Spellos as Gus: A witty production assistant of American Bandstand.
- Michelle Morgan as Teresa McManus: A regular dancer on Bandstand who does not like Meg.
- Paul D. Roberts as Dick Clark: Host of American Bandstand.
- Michael Burger as Charlie O'Donnell: Announcer of American Bandstand.
- Nigel Thatch as Willie Johnson: A charismatic neighborhood agitator in North Philadelphia who played a major role in instigating the Philadelphia 1964 race riot.
- Virginia Madsen as Rebecca Sandstrom: Helen's friend from a book club. Her character was dropped after the first season.
- Alicia Coppola as Nancy: After meeting Helen while working at the same travel agency, she became one of Helen's confidantes. Nancy dated and then became engaged to Pete Pryor, only to be left standing at the altar.
- Hank Stratton as Donald Norville: Helen's colleague at the travel agency. He is later fired for being homosexual.
- Steve Ryan as Father Conti: The Pryor family's strict Catholic priest, who also serves as the headmaster of East Catholic high school.
- James Read and Barbara Alyn Woods as Mr. and Mrs. George Mason: Beth's well-to-do parents. Estranged from Beth after she became pregnant with JJ Pryor's child, although some reconciliation was attempted in the show's third season.
- Art Garfunkel as Mr. Greenwood: The bohemian owner of the Vinyl Crocodile record store. Appeared sporadically during the first season; in the third season he is said to have gone "on a worldwide tour with his friend", an allusion to Art Garfunkel's singing partnership with Paul Simon.
- Daphne Zuniga as Shelly Pierce: A single mom who works at a nearby Playboy Club and the Pryors' next-door neighbor (starting at the beginning of Season 3).
- Murray Rubenstein as Murray: A barbershop owner whose business is next to Pryor's TV and Radio. A frequent visitor to the store, though he rarely buys anything.
- Caitlin Greer as Audrey: A University of Pennsylvania student who befriends Meg and Sam.

== Episodes ==
=== Season 1 (2002–03) ===
No. overall	No. in season	Title	Directed by	Written by	Original release date	US viewers (millions)
1	1	"Pilot"	David Semel	Jonathan Prince	September 29, 2002	13.9
2	2	"The End of the Innocence"	David Semel	Jonathan Prince	October 6, 2002	13.2
3	3	"New Frontier"	Dan Lerner	Becky Hartman Edwards	October 13, 2002	10.4
4	4	"Pryor Knowledge"	Patrick Norris	Emily Whitesell	October 20, 2002	11.1
5	5	"The Fighting Irish"	David Semel	Jon Harmon Feldman	October 27, 2002	11.0
6	6	"Soldier Boy"	Bill D'Elia	John Romano	November 3, 2002	12.3
7	7	"Cold Snap"	Michael W. Watkins	Rama Laurie Stagner	November 10, 2002	11.5
8	8	"Black and White"	Tucker Gates	Becky Hartman Edwards & John Romano	November 17, 2002	10.1
9	9	"The Home Front"	Ellen S. Pressman	Jon Harmon Feldman	December 1, 2002	10.8
10	10	"Silent Night"	Randy Zisk	Emily Whitesell	December 15, 2002	10.0
11	11	"I Wanna Hold Your Hand"	David Semel	Sherri Cooper-Landsman	January 5, 2003	10.7
12	12	"Great Expectations"	Mark Piznarski	Deborah Swisher	January 12, 2003	10.7
13	13	"The Pursuit of Happiness"	Craig Zisk	Rama Laurie Stagner	February 2, 2003	10.7
14	14	"Heartache"	Michael W. Watkins	Becky Hartman Edwards	February 9, 2003	10.6
15	15	"False Start"	Randy Zisk	Liz Tigelaar	February 16, 2003	9.3
16	16	"Act of Contrition"	David Semel	John Romano	March 2, 2003	10.8
17	17	"Past Imperfect"	Mark Piznarski	Jon Harmon Feldman & Emily Whitesell	March 9, 2003	9.1
18	18	"The One"	Oz Scott	Michael Foley	March 16, 2003	9.4
19	19	"Where the Boys Are"	David Semel	David B. Harris & Christine Schenley	March 30, 2003	9.7
20	20	"The Carpetbaggers"	Steven Robman	Becky Hartman Edwards	April 6, 2003	9.85
21	21	"Fear Itself"	Bryan Spicer	Rama Laurie Stagner	April 13, 2003	7.78
22	22	"Secrets and Lies"	David Semel	Emily Whitesell	April 27, 2003	7.42
23	23	"Down the Shore"	Leslie Libman	Jon Cowan & Robert L. Rovner	May 4, 2003	9.12
24	24	"High Hopes"	Craig Zisk	Becky Hartman Edwards & John Romano	May 11, 2003	8.12
25	25	"City on Fire"	David Semel	Jonathan Prince	May 18, 2003	9.02

=== Season 2 (2003–04) ===
No. overall	No. in season	Title	Directed by	Written by	Original release date	US viewers (millions)
26	1	"And Promises to Keep"	David Semel	Jonathan Prince	September 28, 2003	9.6
27	2	"R-E-S-P-E-C-T"	Bryan Spicer	Emily Whitesell	October 5, 2003	7.4
28	3	"Another Saturday Night"	Timothy Busfield	Becky Hartman Edwards	October 12, 2003	8.5
29	4	"Crossing the Line"	Craig Zisk	Josh Reims	October 19, 2003	7.4
30	5	"Life's Illusions"	James Whitmore Jr.	Rama Laurie Stagner	October 26, 2003	9.7
31	6	"Rescue Me"	David Semel	John Romano	November 2, 2003	7.7
32	7	"Ticket to Ride"	Norberto Barba	Oliver Goldstick	November 16, 2003	8.4
33	8	"Change a-Comin'"	Paris Barclay	Nancy Won	November 23, 2003	8.7
34	9	"The Long Goodbye"	David Semel	Emily Whitesell	November 30, 2003	9.6
35	10	"The 7–10 Split"	Mark Piznarski	Becky Hartman Edwards	January 4, 2004	9.7
36	11	"Beyond the Wire"	Michael Katleman	Michael Foley	January 11, 2004	9.4
37	12	"Real-to-Reel"	Jessica Yu	Rama Laurie Stagner	January 18, 2004	7.5
38	13	"To Tell the Truth"	David Semel	Josh Reims	February 15, 2004	10.5
39	14	"Old Enough to Fight"	Randy Zisk	Liz Tigelaar	February 22, 2004	8.5
40	15	"Shoot the Moon"	Elodie Keene	Oliver Goldstick	March 7, 2004	8.7
41	16	"Can't Hold On"	Tom Verica	Nancy Won	March 14, 2004	9.0
42	17	"Chasing the Past"	Daniel Attias	Josh Reims	March 21, 2004	8.9
43	18	"Stewart's Charge"	Daniel Attias	Josh King	March 28, 2004	9.0
44	19	"No Way Out"	David Semel	Emily Whitesell	April 4, 2004	8.4

=== Season 3 (2004–05) ===
No. overall	No. in season	Title	Directed by	Written by	Original release date	US viewers (millions)
45	1	"Long Shots and Short Skirts"	David Semel	Rama Laurie Stagner	September 26, 2004	8.61
46	2	"Charade"	Robert Singer	Emily Whitesell	October 3, 2004	7.49
47	3	"Leaders of the Pack"	Daniel Attias	Josh Reims	October 10, 2004	7.04
48	4	"Surround Me"	Félix Enríquez Alcalá	Nancy Won	October 17, 2004	6.36
49	5	"So Long, Farewell"	Tom Verica	Becky Hartman Edwards	October 24, 2004	6.61
50	6	"Clear and Present Danger"	Lev L. Spiro	Liz Tigelaar	October 31, 2004	7.05
51	7	"What Dreams May Come"	James Whitmore Jr.	Jason Wilborn	November 7, 2004	7.49
52	8	"One in a Million"	Jim Chory	Michael Foley	November 14, 2004	8.64
53	9	"Tidings of Comfort and Joy"	David Semel	Jonathan Prince	November 21, 2004	8.82
54	10	"Home Again"	Mark Piznarski	Rama Laurie Stagner	January 2, 2005	8.25
55	11	"Truth Be Told"	Emily Whitesell	Josh Reims	January 9, 2005	6.99
56	12	"For Richer, For Poorer"	Eric Laneuville	John Romano	January 23, 2005	7.38
57	13	"Starting Over"	David Semel	Nancy Won	January 30, 2005	7.22
58	14	"The Commencement"	Mark Piznarski	Becky Hartman Edwards	March 9, 2005	7.47
59	15	"California Dreamin'"	Jim Chory	Liz Tigelaar	March 16, 2005	5.81
60	16	"No Satisfaction"	David Semel	Deirdre Shaw	March 23, 2005	6.14
61	17	"It's My Life"	James Whitmore Jr.	Lenn K. Rosenfeld	March 30, 2005	6.00

== Synopsis ==
=== Season 1 ===
In the pilot episode, set in November 1963, Meg and Roxanne win the opportunity to join the dancers on the TV show American Bandstand, filmed in Philadelphia. Passing note is made of the John F. Kennedy assassination and funeral. Bandstand immediately becomes the principal creative pillar of American Dreams, with each episode featuring recreated versions of several musical acts that originally appeared on the real Bandstand, often rendered by modern singers.

JJ Pryor, a running back for the East Catholic Fighting Crusaders football team, tries and fails to earn a full athletic scholarship to play at the University of Notre Dame, so he later applies for and is accepted to Lehigh University. A nagging ankle injury curtails his football career, so he enlists in the United States Marine Corps to pay for school. Meanwhile, JJ's on-again, off-again girlfriend Beth chooses to attend the University of Pennsylvania in order to be near JJ.

In the early part of the season, Meg develops a crush on a Bandstand dancer, and they go on a couple of public appearance dates. While never becoming romantic, they remained good friends. Meg later developed a romance with Luke Foley, a record store clerk and fellow East Catholic student.

Sam Walker wins a track athletic scholarship to East Catholic. Sam's father Henry states that there are only three other black male students at East Catholic; some in the majority-white student body resent Sam's presence, especially Tommy DeFelice, who is later expelled after falsely confessing to JJ's crime of breaking Beth's current boyfriend's windshield. Sam and Meg develop a friendship, even creating a record-swapping club while meeting at the Vinyl Crocodile record store.

In the season finale on May 18, 2003, Meg and Sam are caught in the summer 1964 race riot in Philadelphia.

=== Season 2 ===
Meg and Sam survive the riots unharmed, but the branch of Jack's store under Henry's management is destroyed. Gwen dies from cancer. JJ excels at boot camp and arrives in Vietnam. While on leave, he and Beth are reunited in Hawaii; they break up, but Beth soon learns she is pregnant with JJ's child, and she moves in with the Pryors.

Helen discovers that there might be a possible surgical treatment for Will's paralysis, and the early part of the season deals with Will's medical treatment. By the end of the season, Will's leg braces have been removed and he is able to walk normally.

Roxanne exchanges promise rings with boyfriend Lenny, and goes on tour with him before returning home. Later on, she dates Meg's ex-boyfriend, Luke. Meg dates a college boy, Drew, despite JJ and her father's strong dislike for him, but breaks it off when he ends up cheating on her.

Sam wins a scholarship to the University of Pennsylvania. Jack decides to run for the City Council. In the season finale on April 4, 2004, Sam's cousin Nathan is drafted and opts to go to jail rather than serve in Vietnam. Also in that episode, JJ is caught in a fierce firefight, while Meg and Sam are arrested at a campus rally protesting the Vietnam war.

=== Season 3 ===
The arrests widen the communications gap between parents and children, and inspire Meg to lead additional protests. A strict new headmaster also fires Meg up. An injured JJ wakes up in an American military hospital, and learns of his forthcoming child; Beth refuses to accept JJ's offer of marriage. Roxanne, estranged from her mother, moves in with the Pryors. JJ gets recruited for special, somewhat mysterious duty for the US government. Jack wins an upset victory for the City Council.

As Thanksgiving nears closer, JJ is captured by the Viet Cong. He and his sergeant escape, but are presumed missing in action (the sergeant is later found buried in a shallow grave). The Pryors learn of JJ's "Missing In Action" status just before Thanksgiving.

Luke Foley returns to Philadelphia, and Roxanne, who moves out on her remarrying mother, moves in with him in a loft above the Vinyl Crocodile record store.

On a commercial-free special episode that aired November 21, 2004, JJ returns home. At episode's end he glares harshly at his mother. In the next original episode, JJ becomes a Marine recruiter and suffers from post-traumatic flashbacks. He proposes to Beth. Helen becomes involved with a Catholic peace group.

As the show enters 1966, JJ marries Beth in a ceremony held at the Pryors' catholic church. Jack Pryor, newly elected to the Philadelphia City Council, is forced to take a bribe, with the money going to help JJ repay some gambling debts. Eventually Jack votes to elect a local activist in his district, Reverend Davis, to the Police Review Board essentially voting against the council. For this act of disloyalty, several members of the police force beat up JJ after a traffic stop. Pete soon finds the culprits who attacked JJ and roughs them up, but Jack decides to resign from the council.

Chris and Meg's relationship becomes more intimate, but Meg is troubled by reports that Chris helped set fire to a recruitment center. Despite this, Meg and Chris eventually have sex—with Chris revealing afterward that he did indeed lie to Meg about the recruitment center. Meg and Chris eventually break up, and Chris leaves Philadelphia.

Meg and Sam consider the possibility of a romantic relationship, but JJ and Nathan discourage the idea. Meanwhile, Jack and Pete's older brother Ted gets into a serious car accident, putting him on a respirator. After much soul searching, the Pryors decide to disconnect the machine. After returning home from a Rolling Stones concert, Meg finds her ex-boyfriend Chris standing in front of her home. He's just been drafted.

In the season/series finale, Meg and Chris both leave Philadelphia on Chris' motorcycle, with plans for them to live in Berkeley, California and campaign against the war. JJ Pryor applies for and receives a job in aeronautics, assisting in space suit design for future NASA missions to the Moon.

== Timeline of events in the series ==
=== "Past" events ===
- c. 1920 – Jack Pryor is born.
- c. 1927 – Helen Dolan is born.
- c. September 1945 – Jack Pryor, presumably returning from fighting in World War II, conceives a child with Helen Dolan.
- c. November 1945 – Jack Pryor and Helen Dolan are married.
- c. June 1946 – J.J. Pryor is born.
- c. 1946 – Beth Mason is born.
- c. 1947 – Sam Walker and Luke Foley are born.
- c. March 1948 – Roxanne Bojarski is born.
- c. August 1948 – Meg Pryor is born.
- c. 1951 – Angela Walker is born.
- c. 1950 – Patty Pryor is born.
- c. 1956 – Will Pryor is born.

=== Events depicted on screen ===
- November 1963 – Meg and Roxanne become regular dancers on American Bandstand.
- June 1964 – JJ and Beth graduate from high school.
- August 1964 – The Philadelphia riots take place.
- November 1964 – 1964 U.S. Presidential Election between Lyndon Johnson and Barry Goldwater. (It's mentioned that Ted supported Goldwater.)
- 1965 – Gwen Walker dies.
- June 1965 – Sam graduates from high school.
- November 1965 – Northeast Blackout of 1965
- November 1965 – Beth Mason gives birth to John Pryor III.
- January 1966 – JJ returns home from Vietnam.
- April 23, 1966 – JJ Pryor and Beth Mason are married.
- June 1966 – Meg and Roxanne graduate from high school.
- July 1966 – Ted Pryor dies.

=== "Future" events ===
- June 1968 – Patty's graduation from high school is estimated to take place at this time.
- June 1974 – Will's graduation from high school is estimated to take place at this time.
- June 1984 – John Pryor III's graduation from high school is estimated to take place at this time.

== Ratings ==
Seasonal rankings (based on average total viewers per episode) of American Dreams on NBC.

Viewership and ratings per season of American Dreams
Season	Timeslot (ET)	Episodes	First aired		Last aired		TV season	Viewership rank	Avg. viewers (millions)
Season	Timeslot (ET)	Episodes	Date	Viewers (millions)	Date	Viewers (millions)	TV season	Viewership rank	Avg. viewers (millions)
1	Sunday 8:00 p.m.	25	September 29, 2002	13.9	May 18, 2003	9.02	2002–03	52	9.98
2	Sunday 8:00 p.m.	19	September 28, 2003	9.6	April 4, 2004	8.4	2003–04	67	8.75
3	Sunday 8:00 p.m. (1–13); Wednesday 8:00 p.m. (14–17)	17	September 26, 2004	8.61	March 30, 2005	6.00	2004–05	79	7.20

== Cancellation ==
On May 16, 2005, NBC announced their fall schedule for the 2005–06 season. Confirming months of speculation (and an unofficial confirmation article on May 1 by Reuters), American Dreams was formally canceled, due to low ratings.

Never a strong performer in its Sunday 8pm timeslot, the show's third-season ratings dropped 33% from its first season and 13% from its second season. In the third season, the show was regularly beaten in the Sunday night ratings by ABC's Extreme Makeover: Home Edition and CBS's Cold Case. On February 2, 2005, NBC reduced the number of third-season episodes of American Dreams from 19 to 17. The network also moved the program away from its original Sunday night timeslot to Wednesday nights, airing before The West Wing. This put the show up against CBS's Survivor: Palau and ABC's Lost, and American Dreams could not compete against these popular programs.

As the third season wound down, actors on the show filmed pilots for new shows to possibly air in the 2005–06 television season. Fans of American Dreams organized a campaign to save the show, sending over 5000 supportive e-mails to NBC after the season finale and several thousand postcards to the network as well. On May 4, 2005, fans flew an aerial banner over NBC's Burbank studios in support of the show, even as the show's sets were being dismantled at Sunset-Gower Studios, where it was filmed.

It had been reported that American Dreams may have been canceled as early as December 2004. Jonathan Prince mentioned in a Miami Herald article that he was able to get four additional episodes made by having companies such as Kraft and Nabisco pay for additional episodes in exchange for product placement (Campbell's Soups and Ford also participated in product placement episodes).

== Series epilogue ==
The Philadelphia Inquirer reported on April 12, 2005, that in late February, NBC ordered two endings filmed for the season finale. The un-aired ending was reported to be a 12-minute segment set on July 20, 1969 (the day Apollo 11 landed on the Moon), with Meg returning home to face her family after a three-year absence.

NBC opted not to air the 12-minute epilogue when the third-season finale aired on March 30, 2005, a month and a half before the official cancellation of the series. TV Guide reported on July 26, 2005, that this epilogue was likely to air in a rerun of the third-season finale in August or September, but the airing never materialized. NBC was unable to attract sponsorship for the segment, which reportedly contained many rock-and-roll oldies, resulting in expensive music licensing fees for the network.

During the second annual ATX Television Festival on June 9, 2013, the cast and crew of the show were reunited, and creator Jonathan Prince unveiled for the first time to both the cast and audience, a rough cut of the never-before-seen epilogue.

In the epilogue, a long-haired Meg is seen on a bus (with a caption reading "Three Years Later"). After a couple of fellow hippie travelers inquire about the purpose of her trip, Meg reveals that she's planning to attend Woodstock with Sam (who had just graduated from college), and has traveled upstate early in order to meet up with him. Meg also reveals that she still lives in Berkeley, and hasn't been back home since she left with Chris three years prior. Meg is also planning on staying in New York with Roxanne, who is now married to Luke and has a baby boy named Dustin. Meg later reveals that Patty has graduated from high school and is now attending college at Harvard's sister school, Radcliffe. Throughout her time on the bus (and her conversation with the hippies), Meg reflects on her experiences with her family and friends.

After the hippies leave, Meg is seen pensively staring out of the bus window. The next moment, Meg is standing outside of her former home in Philadelphia, having taken a detour from heading to New York. She runs into her nephew Trip (who is now much older), who tells her that he knows who she is (based on family photos). When asked, she tells him that she came because she wanted to see her family. Trip tells her that everyone is inside, watching the first crewed Moon landing (placing the epilogue on July 20, 1969, the day Apollo 11 landed on the Moon). Tripp reveals that JJ now has a job building space suits for astronauts. Suddenly, Jack (Meg's father) comes out and calls for Trip to come in, when he sees Meg. Trip goes inside, and Helen (Meg's mother) comes outside calling for Jack, but stops when she sees Meg.

An awkward silence passes among the three, until Jack invites Meg inside for leftovers. Jack enters the house as Meg walks up and grabs Helen in a hug, while Jack looks on from inside. Once everyone goes inside, the scene pans out, with Neil Armstrong's famous moon landing address providing a voiceover until the screen goes black.

== Fourth season plotlines ==
In interviews, Jonathan Prince revealed that if American Dreams had been renewed for a fourth season, the following plotlines would have been included.

- The fourth season would have picked up in January 1967.
- Meg would have returned to Philadelphia six episodes into the season after JJ goes to California with intentions to take her home.
- Roxanne would have taken a job as the hairdresser for American Bandstand.
- Jack would become angry after discovering that Helen had been using her job as a travel agent to help young men dodge the draft and flee to Canada.
- There would be tension in JJ and Beth's marriage, after Beth reluctantly agreed to JJ's wishes to postpone going back to college.
- Henry would remarry and accept a new, deaf stepson into his home.
- JJ would continue working for the company designing spacesuits for the crewed mission to the moon.
- The Apollo 1 fire would somehow figure into the fourth season plotline.
- Patty would serve as the Team Manager for the East Catholic football team.

== Special guests ==
During the show's run, several contact artists recreated performances of artists from the 1960s. These recreations were often performed on the American Bandstand stage, although several performances took place at a performing area adjacent to the Vinyl Crocodile record store. In the second and third seasons, several of the recreations took place at The Lair, a coffee house/student union facility on the University of Pennsylvania campus.

The contemporary artists, along with the songs they performed and the artist they "interpreted", are listed below.

=== Season one ===
- Michelle Branch, as Lesley Gore performing "You Don't Own Me" (season 1 episode 2)
- Nick Carter & Ric Felix (aka Ricky Godinez and later billed as Ricky G), as "Jay" and one of the members of Jay and the Americans (respectively), performing "Come a Little Bit Closer" (season 1 episode 6)
- Usher, as Marvin Gaye, performing "Can I Get a Witness" (season 1 episode 7)
- Ashanti, as Dionne Warwick, performing "Walk On By" (season 1 episode 10)
- Vanessa Carlton, as Dusty Springfield, performing "Wishin' and Hopin'" (season 1 episode 14)
- Wayne Brady, as Jackie Wilson, performing "Baby Workout" (season 1 episode 18)
- LeAnn Rimes, as Connie Francis, performing "Where the Boys Are" (season 1 episode 19)
- Duncan Sheik, as Bobby Darin, performing "Beyond the Sea" (season 1 episode 19)
- Vivian Green, as Brenda Holloway, performing "Every Little Bit Hurts" (season 1 episode 20)
- Rosey, as Ella Fitzgerald performing "Dream A Little Dream Of Me" (season 1 episode 20)
- B2K & Marques Houston, as The Temptations, performing "My Girl" (season 1 episode 22)
- The Thorns, as the Beach Boys, performing "Warmth of the Sun" (season 1 episode 23)
- Third Eye Blind, as The Kinks, performing "All Day and All of the Night" (season 1 episode 23)
- Ashley Williams, as Sandie Shaw, performing "(There's) Always Something There to Remind Me" (season 1 episode 24)
- Stacie Orrico, as the lead singer of The Angels, performing "My Boyfriend's Back" (Brittany Snow and Vanessa Lengies were the backup singers on Orrico's cover of the song) (season 1 episode 25)
- Kelly Rowland, as Martha Reeves of Martha and the Vandellas, performing "Nowhere To Run" (season 1 episode 25)

=== Season two ===
- Kelly Clarkson, as Brenda Lee, performing "Sweet Nothin's" (season 2 episode 1)
- Vanessa Soul, as Barbara Lewis, performing "Baby I'm Yours" (season 2 episode 1)
- Monica, as Mary Wells, performing "My Guy" (season 2 episode 2)
- Lil' Kim, as Shirley Ellis, performing "The Clapping Song" (season 2 episode 3)
- Third Eye Blind, as The Kinks, performing "You Really Got Me" (season 2 episode 4)
- Kelly Rowland, as Martha Reeves of Martha and the Vandellas, performing "Dancing in the Street" (season 2 episode 5)
- Alicia Keys, as Fontella Bass, performing "Rescue Me" (season 2 episode 6)
- Kembra Shannon, as Kim Weston, performing "Take Me In Your Arms (Rock Me A Little While)" (season 2 episode 7)
- Steadman, as the Dave Clark Five, performing "Do You Love Me" (season 2 episode 7)
- Hilary and Haylie Duff, as members of The Shangri-Las, performing "Leader of the Pack" (season 2 episode 8)
- Richie Sambora, as Eric Clapton of the Yardbirds, performing "For Your Love" (season 2 episode 9)
- Jennifer Love Hewitt, as Nancy Sinatra, performing "These Boots Are Made For Walking" (season 2 episode 10)
- Brad Paisley, as Ricky Nelson, performing "Dream Lover" (season 2 episode 10)
- Josh Kelley, as Barry McGuire, performing "Eve of Destruction" (season 2 episode 10)
- Macy Gray, as Carla Thomas, performing "B.A.B.Y" (season 2 episode 12)
- Charlotte Martin, as Petula Clark performing "Downtown" (season 2 episode 13)
- Nick Lachey, as Tom Jones, performing "It's Not Unusual" (season 2 episode 13)
- Chris Isaak, as Roy Orbison, performing "Pretty Woman" (season 2 episode 14)
- Jennifer Love Hewitt, as Nancy Sinatra, performing "Sunny" (season 2 episode 14)
- Tyler Hilton, as a folk singer, performing The Beatles' "I've Just Seen a Face" (season 2 episode 14)
- Ricky Fante, as Wilson Pickett, performing "Land of 1000 Dances" (season 2 episode 15)
- Liz Phair, as Jackie DeShannon, performing "When You Walk in the Room" (season 2 episode 16)
- Tyra Banks, as a member of The Velvelettes, performing "He Was Really Sayin' Somethin'" (season 2 episode 17)
- Evan & Jaron, as The Everly Brothers, performing "Wake Up Little Susie" (season 2 episode 17)
- Jason Mraz, as Dion DiMucci, performing "Ruby Baby" (season 2 episode 18)
- Fefe Dobson, as Tina Turner, performing "River Deep - Mountain High" (season 2 episode 18)
- Wyclef Jean, as Curtis Mayfield, performing "Woman's Got Soul" (season 2 episode 19)

=== Season three ===
- Brandy Norwood, as Gladys Knight, performing "I Heard It Through the Grapevine" (season 3 episode 1)
- Nicole Richie, as the lead singer of The Exciters, performing "Tell Him" (season 3 episode 2)
- Hawk Nelson, as The Who, performing "My Generation" (season 3 episode 3)
- Phantom Planet, as The Zombies, performing "Tell Her No" (season 3 episode 6)
- Fantasia Barrino, as Aretha Franklin, performing "Respect" (season 3 episode 8)
- Otis and the Elevators, as Jimmy Smith, performing "Got My Mojo Working" (season 3 episode 8)
- Kelly Clarkson, as Brenda Lee, performing "Rockin' Around the Christmas Tree" (season 3 episode 9)
- JoJo, as Linda Ronstadt, auditioning for Bandstand with "That'll Be The Day" (season 3 episode 9)
- 112 as The Four Tops, performing "Reach Out, I'll Be There"
- Van Hunt, as Jimmy Ruffin, performing "What Becomes of the Brokenhearted" (season 3 episode 12)
- John Legend, as Stevie Wonder, performing "Uptight (Everything's Alright)" (season 3 episode 15)
- Fountains of Wayne, as The Hollies, performing "Bus Stop" (season 3 episode 16)

=== Performances at the Vinyl Crocodile ===
- India.Arie, as Nina Simone, performing "Come Ye" (season 1 episode 15)
- Keb 'Mo, as Son House, songs performed currently unknown. (season 1 episode 12)

=== Performances at the Lair ===
- Five for Fighting performing a folk arrangement of his 2004 recording "If God Made You"
- Art Alexakis, as Country Joe McDonald, performing "The "Fish" Cheer/I-Feel-Like-I'm-Fixin'-to-Die Rag"
- Joss Stone, performing a folk arrangement of her 2005 hit "Right to Be Wrong"
- Alanis Morissette, as a folk singer performing her original composition "Offer"
- Bonnie McKee, as Janis Joplin, performing "Summertime"
- Hayley Westenra performed "Who Painted the Moon Black?" from her album Pure on episode 46.
- Blake Shelton, performing his song "Playboys of the Southwestern World" from his 2003 CD The Dreamer.
- Ben Taylor as Cal Cooper, performing his original song "Surround Me".
- Gavin DeGraw, performing "The Tracks of My Tears"

=== Other guest star appearances ===
- Paris Hilton, as Barbara Eden of I Dream of Jeannie
- Tavis Smiley, as Thurgood Marshall
- Brian McKnight, as Stokely Carmichael
- Kevin McCorkle, as astronaut Gus Grissom
- Rich Vos, as Lenny Bruce
- Eric the Midget, as Travel Agency Customer
- Kristen Bell, as Amy Fielding
- Randy Jackson, as Band Manager
- Montel Williams, as Reverend Gilliam

== Accuracy ==
Despite its popularity as a family drama, American Dreams was heavily criticized for its various levels of historical inaccuracy. Several historic events were restaged earlier or later in the show's timeline to fit a plotline, and some of the music and pop culture references do not match up with either historic fact or the show's current timeline. Several arguments between the show's loyal fanbase can be traced to whether the show should be viewed as a chronologically accurate representation of life in 1960s Philadelphia, or is instead an idealized combination of mnemonic images and pop culture references from points throughout the 1960s, much as the film The Wedding Singer was for the 1980s.

Some examples of these disputes include:

- A running plotline is the appearance of Meg and Roxanne as dancers on American Bandstand, which still tapes a daily after-school show in Philadelphia; where in real life the show moved to Los Angeles in February 1964 and was only broadcast once a week, on Saturday afternoons (in real life, the studio used for Bandstand was later appropriated by the stations of public broadcasting operation WHYY after WFIL's donation of them shortly after moving to their new City Avenue studios).
- In the pilot episode, Jack makes a reference to Ara Parseghian and Notre Dame. The pilot was set in November 1963 while Parseghian was hired by Notre Dame in December.
- In the first year, JJ Pryor Jr supposedly attended Lehigh University on a football scholarship in 1963 but joined the Marines when injured to pay for college. Lehigh doesn't have athletic scholarships but gives financial grants in aid instead. Thus he would have still had financial aid even if injured.
- The Philadelphia 1964 race riot depicted in the first-season finale started at night, not in the daytime, as depicted in the show. Television footage of the riots shown on the episode actually came from the Watts riots of 1965 Los Angeles.
- During the show's first season, the music of several artists, such as the Kinks, Dusty Springfield and Manfred Mann, are heard and referenced in 1963, months before the Beatles' appearance on The Ed Sullivan Show (February 1964) that triggered the musical British Invasion.
- When the Beatles appear on The Ed Sullivan Show, the scene is set up so that the first song the Beatles play is "I Want to Hold Your Hand", which was the Beatles' first American hit, but was not the first song played on Ed Sullivan (that honor goes to "All My Loving").
- In one episode in the show's third season, set in late November 1965, the East Coast Blackout and the Leonid meteor shower were both "rescheduled" so that they would fall on the same day that Beth Mason gave birth to JJ Pryor's son.
- In a first-season episode, Meg and Roxanne gush over meeting the group Jay and the Americans, and Roxanne is especially enamored with "Carl, the drummer" (the group neither had a member named Carl, nor a drummer, in real life). Also in real life, there were two lead singers known as "Jay" – Jay Traynor, who sang on their hit "She Cried", and Jay Black, who replaced Traynor for the group's other hits — yet on the episode, it is assumed that there was only one "Jay" who sang all the hits without interruption.
- In the show's first season, set in November 1963, Meg Pryor and Luke Foley argue over the merits of Bob Dylan, and Luke hands Meg a 45 of Dylan singing "Mr. Tambourine Man." In fact, Dylan did not write or perform the song until 1964, and he never released it on a commercial 45 (it appeared on his "Bringing It All Back Home" album released in early 1965), although the Byrds' rendition of it was a hit single. Note that before Luke hands meg the Dylan record, he specifically says that it is "an advanced copy of the record that won't be released until next year."
- References are made in the show's second season to I Dream of Jeannie, which was still a year away from premiering. On top of that, "the big band theme song" heard, is the one introduced at the beginning of the show's second season (which was a re-creation of the original theme). It was performed & produced by LA guitarist Rick Fleishman, and it also featured LA session drummer Paul Goldberg. (It's the one most viewers were familiar with in 1966).
- The Monkees perform on the Bandstand stage in January 1966, despite their television series not even premiering until September 1966, or the four actors playing the Monkees even performing a live concert until a year later.
- In an episode set in January/February 1965, Nancy Sinatra (Jennifer Love Hewitt) appears on American Bandstand to sing "These Boots are Made for Walking" despite the fact the song was not released until 1966.
- While working at the space suit company, JJ Pryor meets Gus Grissom, and they discuss the Apollo 1 mission. Grissom later says, "Get me back to Cape Canaveral." In reality, the Apollo 1 mission was not designated by that number or name until after the accident that claimed the lives of Grissom and two other astronauts (at the time the mission was known as Apollo/Saturn 204), and the reference to Cape Canaveral would have been wrong, as the area where the space center was located had been renamed "Cape Kennedy" during the 1960s. While the town was officially renamed back to Cape Canaveral in 1973, the space center was (and still is) known as the Kennedy Space Center, and at least three years had passed since the town was renamed from Cape Canaveral to Cape Kennedy; so although it is not impossible that in a casual conversation Grissom would have used the traditional name, it is still unlikely that this would happen.
- Artists such as Blake Shelton, John Ondrasik and Joss Stone are allowed to perform their current pop hits, which in real time would have been 40 years away from ever existing.
- Neither The Who nor Ricky Nelson ever performed on the Bandstand stage in real life (Nelson's father Ozzie refused to allow his performing son to appear on anybody else's TV series, even if such appearance might help increase record sales); but that didn't stop the producers from staging performances by those artists in this series.
- The Who is shown performing on Bandstand in the show's third season, set in 1965–1966. However The Who's first performance in the United States wasn't until the Monterey Pop Festival in 1967.
- In an episode that is supposedly taking place in the spring of 1965, two customers at the TV store, played by Days of Our Lives actors John Aniston and Frances Reid, were watching an episode of Days of our Lives on a TV (Frances was watching herself on an early episode). Days of our Lives did not premiere until November 8, 1965.
- In an episode purporting to take place in the summer of 1966, a character on "American Bandstand" is asked to rate the Rolling Stones' song "(I Can't Get No) Satisfaction", despite the song being over a year old.
- In a late third-season episode, Meg, Roxanne and Luke sit outside Connie Mack Stadium with lawn chairs, listening for free to the Rolling Stones, who are playing a live concert at the stadium. Luke makes a reference that he heard a Bob Dylan concert at Connie Mack Stadium for free this way. Bob Dylan did not play Connie Mack Stadium as an outdoor venue in 1966 or earlier.
- In another third-season episode that takes place in June 1966, the Mamas and the Papas appear on American Bandstand to perform "California Dreamin'". However, the Mamas and Papas actual appearance on the show was in February 1966, they did not appear again in June of that year.
- Characters are depicted as listening to Cream's "I Feel Free" and The Spencer Davis Group's "Gimme Some Lovin'" as early as the summer of 1965, despite neither song being released until late in 1966, after the timeline of the series had ended.
- JJ Pryor enlists in the Marines and goes to Vietnam in 1964, however President Johnson did not order the first deployment of Marines (the 9th Marine Expeditionary Brigade) until March 8, 1965.

== Home media ==
The first season of American Dreams was released on DVD in September 2004. As of January no formal release dates have been announced for the remaining two seasons. Prince has promised that the series epilogue will appear in the third-season DVD release. However, it is widely believed that the huge number of licensed songs on the series make future DVD releases cost prohibitive, although Prince said that was not the case.

On January 26, 2009, it was reported that Prince and other producers from the show were negotiating to get the final two seasons released on DVD, along with including the unaired epilogue. No recent news was made until June 21, 2010, where it was reported that the producers "are closer than ever to debuting a boxed set of all three seasons of American Dreams on DVD". However, negotiations seem to have stalled, with negotiations continuing as of early 2013.

At the second annual ATX Television Festival on June 9, 2013, Prince spoke out on the hold-up on the home media release of seasons 2 and 3, admitting that because of costly music licensing issues, it was unlikely that NBC would find it cost-effective to make those licensing deals unless fans campaigned to prove that the DVDs would sell, suggesting a Kickstarter campaign to gauge interest.

American Dreams — Season One (Extended Music Edition)
Set details		Special features
25 Episodes; 7-Disc Set; 1.33:1 Aspect Ratio; English (Dolby 5.1 Surround)		Audio Commentaries; 250 Rock 'n' Roll Hits; Promo Spots; Music Video with Stacie Orrico and the Cast
Release date		Audio Commentaries; 250 Rock 'n' Roll Hits; Promo Spots; Music Video with Stacie Orrico and the Cast
United States	September 7, 2004	Audio Commentaries; 250 Rock 'n' Roll Hits; Promo Spots; Music Video with Stacie Orrico and the Cast

There are music alterations in the Season 1 DVD release in order to keep music licensing costs down. Prince has noted that the first season retains about "80% of the original music", keeping music he deemed critical to particular scenes, as well as performances of guest stars and music for the Bandstand dancers while replacing some background songs with "cheaper needle-drops" from the 1960s. Prince said he doubted even hard-core fans would notice the difference.

== Soundtrack ==
On May 6, 2003, Hip-O Records released American Dreams — Original Soundtrack 1963–1964, with original and new recordings featured in the show's first season.

No.	Title	Artist	Length
1.	"Generation"	Emerson Hart	2:20
2.	"(Love Is Like a) Heat Wave"	Martha and the Vandellas	2:47
3.	"My Girl"	B2K featuring Marques Houston	2:53
4.	"She's Not There"	The Zombies	2:24
5.	"Wishin' and Hopin'"	Vanessa Carlton	2:54
6.	"Don't Worry Baby"	The Beach Boys	2:52
7.	"People Get Ready"	The Impressions	2:39
8.	"Come Ye"	India.Arie	3:11
9.	"Gone, Gone, Gone"	The Everly Brothers	2:04
10.	"My Boyfriend's Back"	Stacie Orrico with Brittany Snow and Vanessa Lengies	2:53
11.	"Beyond the Sea"	Duncan Sheik	2:58
12.	"That's How Strong My Love Is"	Otis Redding	2:25
13.	"You Really Got Me"	The Kinks	2:15
14.	"Every Little Bit Hurts"	Vivian Green	3:01
15.	"The Sounds of Silence"	Simon and Garfunkel	3:07
16.	"Generation (Theme from American Dreams)" (Video)	Emerson Hart	2:35

== Broadcasts ==
American Dreams was shown for three years on NBC from 2002 to 2005. The first two seasons were shown in the United Kingdom (on the Hallmark Channel and Trouble), in Denmark (TV2), in Brazil (Sony Entertainment Television) and in Poland (TV Puls).
