= Jay Black =

American singer (1938–2021)

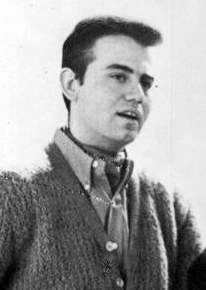
- Black in 1963

Background information
- Born: David Blatt; November 2, 1938; Queens, New York City, U.S.
- Died: October 22, 2021 (aged 82) Queens, New York City, U.S.
- Genre: Rock and roll
- Occupation: Singer
- Years active: 1960–2017
- Formerly of: Jay and the Americans

Jay Black (born David Blatt; November 2, 1938 – October 22, 2021) was an American singer whose height of fame came in the 1960s when he was the lead singer of the vocal group Jay and the Americans. The group had numerous hits including "Come a Little Bit Closer", "Cara Mia", and "This Magic Moment".

== Early life ==
Black was born in New York City and grew up in the Brooklyn neighborhood of Borough Park. His parents Herman and Francis (née Smith) raised him in the Orthodox Jewish tradition. Jay and his brother spoke Yiddish fluently.

== Career ==
Jay Black was the second, and most widely known, Jay to lead the vocal group Jay and the Americans, the first being Jay Traynor and the third being Jay Reincke. Black had come from the doo-wop group The Empires. He had sung lead on their 1962 lone Epic Records single "Time and a Place" b/w "Punch Your Nose" (Epic 5-9527). Jay and the Americans held an audition at founding member Sandy Deanne's parents' house, where Blatt stunned them with his rendition of "Cara Mia". He had previously used David Black as his professional name, but changed his first name to suit the group's existing name. The group had numerous hits, including "Come a Little Bit Closer", "Cara Mia", and "This Magic Moment". The Americans split up in 1973, and Black would continue to perform, billing himself as "Jay and the Americans". Black performed as a vocalist on every record by Jay and the Americans made during their original run, with the exception of their first few singles and their debut album, She Cried.

In 1966, he recorded a Yiddish song "Where Is My Village" about the Holocaust. In 1977, he acted as Tommy Sindardos in the 1977 made-for-television film Contract on Cherry Street, starring Frank Sinatra.

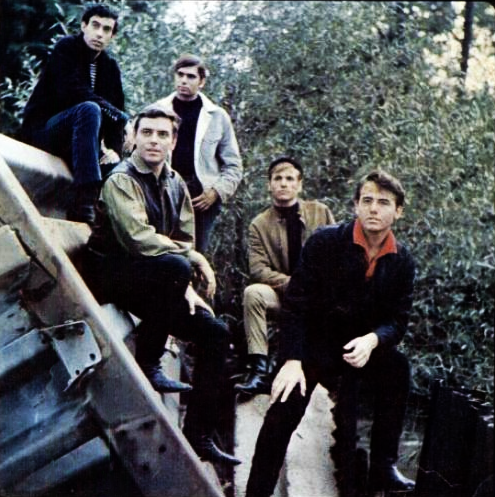
Black (first from right) with Jay and the Americans in 1965

In 2006, Black completed bankruptcy proceedings in Manhattan, after he accrued a $500,000 debt in back taxes to the IRS as a result of his gambling addiction. The IRS initially sought to force him to sell the rights to perform as "Jay Black" as well as the trademark for "Jay and the Americans" in order to satisfy his debt to the IRS. Black did, however, he won a partial victory in the case, which granted him the right to continue to use the name "Jay Black", but he was required to sell the rights to perform as "Jay and the Americans". The trademark to "Jay and the Americans" was purchased by former members of the band Sandy Deanne, Howie Kane, and Marty Sanders.

He later performed as "Jay Black The Voice", but would still sing songs by the Americans. In 2011, Black performed for PBS, showcasing his longstanding range at age 72. In his later career, he was known for touring New York State and Florida, singing, mainly solo, and preceding his singing with a comedy routine. His final performance was in 2017.

In 2017, "Come a Little Bit Closer", a hit for Jay and the Americans in 1964, was featured in the soundtrack for Guardians of the Galaxy Vol. 2. The soundtrack album went gold in the U.S. and sold more than 2.5 million copies worldwide.

== Personal life ==
Black had four children, one of whom is American musician and singer-songwriter Beau Black.

== Health problems and death ==
In a 2014 interview, Black suggested that he might have been suffering from the early stages of Alzheimer's disease, but that was not officially diagnosed.

Black died from pneumonia in New York on October 22, 2021. At the time of his death, it was confirmed that he also had dementia.

== Discography ==
=== Jay and the Americans ===
Studio albums

- Come a Little Bit Closer (1964)
- Blockbusters (1965)
- Sunday and Me (1966)
- Livin' Above Your Head (1966)
- Try Some of This! (1967)
- Sands of Time (1969)
- Wax Museum (1970)
- Capture the Moment (1970)

=== Solo ===
Singles

| Year | Label | A-side | B-side |
|---|---|---|---|
| 1967 | United Artists | "What Will My Mary Say" | "Return To Me" |
| 1975 | Atlantic | "Running Scared" | "Dolphins" |
| 1976 | Roulette | "One Night Affair" | "Between Two Worlds" |
| 1976 | Private Stock | "Everytime You Walk In The Room" | "I'd Build A Bridge" |
| 1978 | Millennium | "Love Is In The Air" | "(Don't Go) Please Stay" |
| 1980 | Midsong International | "The Part Of Me That Needs You Most" | "You Stole The Music" |

=== The Empires ===
Singles

| Year | Label | A-side | B-side |
|---|---|---|---|
| 1962 | Epic | "Time And A Place" | "Punch Your Nose" |
