= Howie Kane =

American singer (1941–2023)

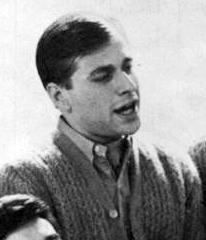
- Kane in 1963

Background information
- Born: Howard G. Kirschenbaum; June 6, 1941; U.S.
- Died: March 2023 (aged 81)
- Occupation: Singer
- Years active: 1960–1973, 2006–2023
- Formerly of: Jay and the Americans

Howard G. Kirschenbaum (June 6, 1941 – March 2023), better known as Howie Kane, was an American pop singer who was a member of Jay and the Americans. He sang vocals for the group between 1960 and 1973, and again from 2006 until his death.

== Jay and the Americans ==
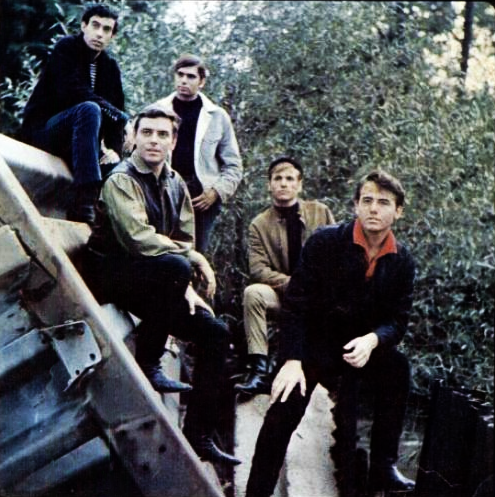
Kane (second from right) with Jay and the Americans in 1966

Born Howard G. Kirschenbaum in 1941, he joined Jay and the Americans in 1960. His childhood friend, Sandy Deanne, was co-founder of the group. In 1961, they signed to United Artists, and Kirschenbaum began releasing records under the name Howie Kane. With Jay Traynor (1943–2014) as their frontman, they first hit the Billboard charts in 1962 with the tune "She Cried" (a cover of a Ted Daryll song), which reached #5. As the group were starting to gain success around the United States, Kane was still attending college and working as a mortician. Traynor left in 1962, and Jay Black (1938–2021) came in as the new lead singer. During the 1960s, Jay and the Americans had hit-after-hit including "Come a Little Bit Closer" in 1964, which hit #3, and "Cara Mia" in 1965, which hit #4.

Following the Americans split in 1973, Kane continued to perform as a solo artist. Howie was inducted, as a member of the Americans, into the Vocal Group Hall of Fame in 2002. In 2006, Jay Black filed for bankruptcy due to gambling debts, and the rights of the name "Jay and the Americans" were sold to Sandy Deanne (Yaguda) and his son as a way to pay it off, for $100,000. After the deal was made, Kane and original members Sandy Deanne and Marty Sanders started to perform again as Jay and the Americans with new lead singer Jay Reinke.

Kane has performed as a vocalist on every record by Jay and the Americans made to date. With the new version of the band formed in 2006, they have released four studio albums: 'Til The End of Time (2010), Sweeter Than Wine (2010), Keepin' the Music Alive (2011), and 45 RPM (2015).

In 2017, "Come a Little Bit Closer", a hit for Jay and the Americans in 1964, was featured in the soundtrack for Guardians of the Galaxy Vol. 2. The soundtrack album went gold in the U.S. and sold more than 2.5 million copies worldwide.

== Personal life and death ==
Kane was an alcoholic and entered a 12-step program and sobered up, and worked for nearly 20 years counselling adolescents and adults who suffered from similar addictions. Howard was married twice and had two children, one from his first marriage, and the two from his other. His youngest child was adopted. Kane was still touring with the Americans when he died in March 2023, at the age of 81.
