= Come a Little Bit Closer (album) =

Studio album by Jay and the Americans
- Released: 1964
- Recorded: 1964
- Genre: Pop
- Length: 30:00
- Label: United Artists
- Producer: Jerry Leiber, Mike Stoller, Artie Ripp

Jay and the Americans chronology
At the Cafe Wha? (1962)	Come a Little Bit Closer (1964)	Blockbusters (1964)

Singles from Come a Little Bit Closer
- 1. "This Is It" Released: June 8, 1962; 2. "What's the Use" Released: February 1963; 3. "Only in America" Released: July 1, 1963; 4. "Come Dance with Me" Released: October 29, 1963; 5. "To Wait for Love" Released: February 1964; 6. "Come a Little Bit Closer" Released: June 30, 1964

Come a Little Bit Closer is the third studio album by the American rock group Jay and the Americans, released in 1964 by United Artists Records.

== Reception ==
In a retrospective review for AllMusic, Bruce Eder called the album "odd" for how it collects random singles but is not a greatest hits album, characterizing it as "a slapped together effort" in order to capitalize on the success of "Come a Little Bit Closer" that features "good if not exceptional pop-rock".

== Track listing ==
Side one

1. "Come a Little Bit Closer" (Tommy Boyce, Bobby Hart, Wes Farrell) – 2:30
2. "She Doesn't Know It" (Artie Kornfeld, Jerry Keller) – 2:37
3. "Strangers Tomorrow" (Van McCoy) – 2:17
4. "What's the Use" (Norman Meade, Winifred Robinson) – 2:50
5. "Only in America" (Jerry Leiber, Mike Stoller, Cynthia Weil, Barry Mann) – 2:23
6. "Look in My Eyes Maria" (Burt Bacharach, Hal David) – 2:23

Side two

1. "To Wait for Love" (Bacharach, David) – 2:14
2. "Friday" (Tony Powers, Ellie Greenwich) – 3:00
3. "This Is It" (Powers, Greenwich) – 2:45
4. "Come Dance with Me" (Powers, Matt Maurer) – 2:10
5. "Tomorrow" (Ted Daryll, Greg Richards) – 2:12
6. "Goodbye Boys Goodbye (Ciao Ragazzi Ciao)" (Sid Tepper, Roy C. Bennett, Mogol, Michele del Prete, Adriano Celentano) – 2:00

== Personnel ==
- Jerry Leiber – producer (3–11)
- Mike Stoller – producer (3–11)
- Artie Ripp – producer (1–2, 12)
