= Sands of Time (Jay and the Americans album) =

Album by Jay and the Americans

Studio album by Jay and The Americans
- Released: March 15, 1969
- Recorded: 1968/69
- Genre: Pop
- Label: United Artists
- Producer: Jay and the Americans

Jay and The Americans chronology
Try Some of This! (1967)	Sands of Time (1969)	Wax Museum (1970)

Singles from Sands of Time
- 1. "This Magic Moment" Released: October 28, 1968

Sands of Time is the seventh studio album by Jay and the Americans released on March 15, 1969. The album went to #51 on the Billboard 200 chart, reached #30 on the Cashbox chart, and #47 in Canada.

The song "This Magic Moment" hit #6 on the Billboard Hot 100, #1 in Canada, and was the group's first top ten hit in over three years. The song "Hushabye" hit #62 (#42 Canada), and "When You Dance" went to #70 in 1969 (#40 Canada). The album was conducted and arranged by Thomas Jefferson Kaye. Following the release of the similarly-themed follow-up album Wax Museum in 1970, "Sands of Time" was reissued under the title Wax Museum, Vol. 2.

== Background and recording ==
The string and horn arrangements for Sands of Time, which are credited on the album to simply "You know who you are", were done on some tracks by Thomas Jefferson Kaye and on the others by Walter Becker and Donald Fagen. Becker and Fagen were retained as songwriters by JATA Enterprises, a production and publishing company founded by the members of Jay and the Americans, but labels were not interested in their songs and so Jay and the Americans member Kenny Vance gave them the arranging job to provide them with income. Becker and Fagen had no experience with instrumental arrangements, and so they purchased and read some books on arranging before starting work on the album.

== Reception ==
Professional ratings
Review scores
Source	Rating
Allmusic	4.5/5 stars

In a retrospective review, Greg Adams of Allmusic commented that Sands of Time was devoted to the doo wop songs from Jay and the Americans' past, but informed by contemporary folk-rock vocal groups, updating the oldies tunes such that they could never be confused with the original recordings. He summed it up as "an entertaining and paradoxically forward-looking bit of nostalgia."

== Track listing ==
1. "This Magic Moment" (Doc Pomus, Mort Shuman)
2. "Pledging My Love" (Ferdinand Washington, Don Robey)
3. "Can't We Be Sweethearts" (J. Herbert Cox, Morris Levy)
4. "My Prayer" (Georges Boulanger, Jimmy Kennedy)
5. "So Much in Love" (George Williams, Bill Jackson, Roy Straigis)
6. "Since I Don't Have You" (Joseph Rock, James Beaumont)
7. "Gypsy Woman" (Curtis Mayfield)
8. "Hushabye" (Doc Pomus, Mort Shuman)
9. "When You Dance" (Andrew Jones, Jr.)
10. "Life Is But a Dream" (Raoul Cita, Hy Weiss, Sam Weiss)
11. "Mean Woman Blues" (Claude Demetrius)
12. "Goodnight My Love" (George Motola, John Marascalco)

== Personnel ==
Jay and the Americans

- Jay Black – lead vocals
- Kenny Vance – vocals, tambourine, guitar
- Sandy Deanne – vocals, keyboards
- Howie Kane – vocals
- Marty Sanders – vocals, guitar

Additional personnel

- Thomas Jefferson Kaye – arrangements, conducting, keyboards, guitar
- Paul Naumann – guitar
- Magic Murray Shiffrin – guitar
- Bill Colby – bass
- Bobby Rizzo – bass
- Paul Griffin – keyboards
- Kenny Laguna – keyboards
- John Discepolo – drums
- Earl Williams – drums
- Mike Ratti – drums
- Elliot Rosoff – conducting
- Sally Rosoff – cello
- Bernie Glow – first trumpet
- Sonny Land – second trumpet
- Benny Powell – first trombone
- Jackie Jeffers – second trombone
- Buzz Brauner – saxophone on "When You Dance"
- Seldon Powell – saxophone on "Can't We Be Sweethearts"

== Wax Museum, Vol. 2 ==
Wax Museum, Volume 2

Studio album by Jay and the Americans
- Released: 1970
- Recorded: 1968/69
- Genre: Pop
- Label: United Artists Records
- Producer: Jay and the Americans

Jay and the Americans chronology
Wax Museum (1970)	Wax Museum, Volume 2 (1970)	Capture the Moment (1971)

Following the release of the similarly-themed follow-up album Wax Museum in 1970, "Sands of Time" was reissued under the title Wax Museum, Vol. 2. The cover of the retitled and reissued album features a note saying "This album was formerly issued under the name of 'Sands of Time' UAS 6671". The LP features the same track listing in the same order.
