= Sandy Deanne =

American singer (born 1943)

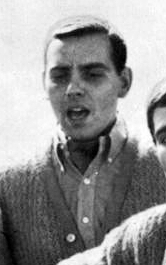
- Deanne with Jay and the Americans in 1963

Background information
- Also known as: Sandy Deanne
- Born: Louis Sandy Yaguda; January 30, 1943 (age 83); Brooklyn, New York, U.S.
- Genre: Pop rock
- Occupation: Singer
- Years active: 1960–present
- Member of: Jay and the Americans

Sandy Deanne (born Louis Sandy Yaguda, January 30, 1943), also known as Sandy Yaguda, is an American vocalist who has been a member of Jay and the Americans since forming in 1960. Following the death of Howie Kane in 2023, he was the last founding member of Jay and the Americans still touring with the group until early 2024.

== Early life ==
Born Louis Sandy Yaguda in Brooklyn, New York City, he would later perform professionally as Sandy Deanne. His ambition to become a musician came along after seeing Elvis Presley on television and The Belmonts singing I Wonder Why. It was also his sisters singing and dancing lessons that grew his love for music:

Music started early for me. I was five, and my older sister was on the way to becoming a professional singer. She was taken every day after school by my mom to the city, for all kinds of singing and dancing lessons. I was dragged along because there was no one to watch me. I loved every second of it. When we came home, my sister would practice and I would practice with her. She stood me on top of the toilet seat and taught me to sing harmony with her. That was it. I was hooked. She played all kinds of records in the house. Bessie Smith, Mel Torme, Ella Fitzgerald, Sarah Vaughn, The Pied Pipers featuring Frank Sinatra,, Lena Horne, The Four Freshmen, were all played constantly Also a lot of blues, we both loved the blues. I soaked it up like a sponge.

== Jay and the Americans ==
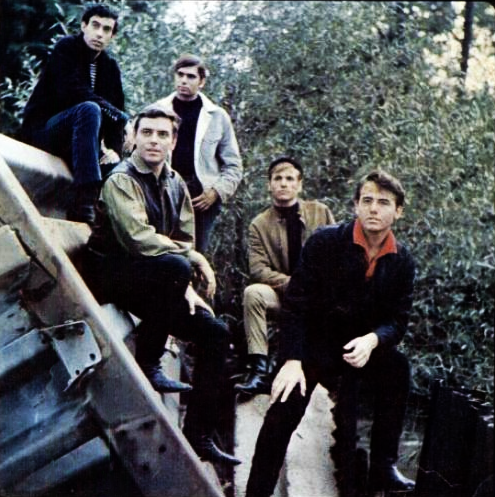
Deanne (second from left) with Jay and the Americans in 1965

In 1960, he formed first group, called The Harborlites, whilst still in high school. The Harborlites had a minor hit with a song written by Deanne, "Is that Too Much to Ask", but Deanne and fellow Harborlite Kenny Vance decided they wanted to form an all-male vocal group instead. Jay and the Americans was formed by Deanne, alongside his boyhood friend Howie Kane, Jay Traynor, and Vance. After signing to United Artists Records in 1961, they released their first single, "Tonight" b/w "The Other Girls". Jay Traynor left in 1962 and Jay Black came in as the new lead singer. In the following years, the Americans would garner more hits such as "This Magic Moment", "She Cried", "Come a Little Bit Closer", and "Cara Mia".

Deanne remained in the Americans until their split in 1973. Like the other members of the group, he went on to tour as a solo artist. Deanne was inducted, as a member of the Americans, into the Vocal Group Hall of Fame in 2002. In 2006, Jay Black filed for bankruptcy due to gambling debts, and sold the rights to the name "Jay and the Americans" to the other members as a way to pay it off, for $100,000. After the deal was made, Deanne, Kane, and Marty Sanders started to perform again as Jay and the Americans.

Deanne has performed as a vocalist on every record by Jay and the Americans made to date. With the new version of the band formed in 2006, they have released four studio albums: 'Til The End of Time (2010), Sweeter Than Wine (2010), Keepin' the Music Alive (2011), and 45 RPM (2015).

In 2017, "Come a Little Bit Closer", a hit for Jay and the Americans in 1964, was featured in the soundtrack for Guardians of the Galaxy Vol. 2. The soundtrack album went gold in the U.S. and sold more than 2.5 million copies worldwide.

Following the death of Howie Kane in March 2023, Deanne is the last founding member of Jay and the Americans still touring with the group (Sanders joined in 1962).

== Personal life ==
Deanne currently lives in Long Beach, New York.
