= Roy Alfred =

American lyricist

- Publicity Photo of Roy Alfred

Roy Alfred (May 14, 1916 – 2008) was an American Tin Pan Alley lyricist whose successful songs included "The Hucklebuck", "Rock and Roll Waltz", "Who Can Explain?", and "Let's Lock the Door (And Throw Away the Key)".

His first major success as a lyricist was "The Best Man", written with Fred Wise, and a hit for Nat "King" Cole in 1946. In 1949, Alfred wrote the words for "The Hucklebuck", a tune originally written as an instrumental credited to Andy Gibson, which was first recorded by Paul Williams and his Hucklebuckers. The vocal version became a hit for Roy Milton, the Tommy Dorsey Orchestra, and Frank Sinatra in 1949, and was later also successful for Chubby Checker (1960) and in Britain for Coast to Coast (1981).

Alfred also wrote the lyrics for "Kee-Mo Ky-Mo", written with Bob Hilliard in 1949, and continued to write successfully through the 1950s and 1960s, often writing novelty lyrics. One of his most successful lyrics was "Rock and Roll Waltz", composed by Shorty Allen and an international hit for Kay Starr in 1955. Alfred's other successes included "Wisdom of a Fool" (written with Abner Silver, 1956), "That's It, I Quit, I'm Movin' On" (written with Del Serino, 1961), and "Let's Lock the Door (and Throw Away the Key)", written with Wes Farrell and a hit for Jay and the Americans in 1964.

He set up the Jonroy music publishing company in 1988, and died in 2008.
