= The Temptations (New York vocal group) =

American vocal group from New York

The Temptations were a vocal group from New York best known for the 1960 hit "Barbara". Issued on Goldisc Records, the song peaked on the Cash Box Magazine chart at #38 and on the Billboard Hot 100 at #29. The flip side song on "Barbara" was "Someday". Other recordings were: "Fickle Little Girl", "Letter of Devotion", "Ballad of Love", and "Tonight My Heart She Is Crying".

Shortly after "Barbara" became a hit, lead singer Neil Stevens left to go solo. The other members of the group were Larry Curtis, Artie Sands and Artie Marin. The group was managed by Arthur "Artie" Ripp.
