= Walking in the Rain (The Ronettes song) =

1964 single by the Ronettes

- US picture sleeve

Single by the Ronettes

from the album Presenting the Fabulous Ronettes Featuring Veronica
- B-side: "How Does It Feel?"
- Released: October 12, 1964
- Genre: R&B
- Length: 3:15
- Label: Philles
- Songwriters: Barry Mann, Phil Spector, Cynthia Weil
- Producer: Phil Spector

The Ronettes singles chronology
"Do I Love You?" (1964)	"Walking in the Rain" (1964)	"Born to Be Together" (1965)

"Walking in the Rain" is a song written by Barry Mann, Phil Spector, and Cynthia Weil. It was originally recorded by the girl group the Ronettes (who had a charting hit with their version) in 1964. Jay and the Americans released a charting hit cover of the song in 1969. The song has since been recorded by many other artists over the years, including the Walker Brothers.

== The Ronettes recording ==
The Ronettes were the first to release "Walking in the Rain". Their single reached number 23 on the Billboard Hot 100 chart in 1964. The song also reached number three on the R&B Singles Chart in 1965. The single contains sound effects of thunder and lightning, which earned audio engineer Larry Levine a Grammy nomination. Phil Spector produced the record.

In 2004, the Ronettes' version was ranked at No. 266 on Rolling Stone's 500 Greatest Songs of All Time, while being moved down to No. 269 in the 2010 update. The song didn't get into the 2021 list.

== Jay and the Americans version ==
"Walkin in the Rain"

Single by Jay and the Americans

from the album Wax Museum, Vol. 1
- B-side: "For the Love of a Lady"
- Released: November 1969
- Genre: Pop
- Length: 2:50
- Label: United Artists
- Songwriters: Barry Mann, Phil Spector, Cynthia Weil
- Producers: Jay and the Americans, Thomas Kaye

Jay and the Americans singles chronology
"When You Dance" (1969)	"Walkin in the Rain" (1969)	"Capture the Moment" (1970)

The pop group Jay and the Americans released a cover of "Walkin' in the Rain" in 1969 on their album Wax Museum, Vol. 1. Their version of the song reached number 19 on the U.S. Billboard Hot 100 and peaked at number 14 on Cash Box. It also hit number 8 on the Adult Contemporary chart. It was the last top-40 hit for the group.

== Chart history ==
The Ronettes

Chart (1964–1965)	Peak position
Canada RPM Top Singles	16
U.S. Billboard Hot 100	23
U.S. Billboard R&B	8
U.S. Cash Box Top 100	20

The Walker Brothers

Chart (1967)	Peak position
UK Singles (OCC)	26

Jay & the Americans

Chart (1969)	Peak position
Canada RPM Top Singles	17
U.S. Billboard Hot 100	19
U.S. Billboard Easy Listening	8
U.S. Cash Box Top 100	14

The Partridge Family starring David Cassidy

Chart (1973)	Peak position
UK Singles (OCC)	10

Cheetah

Chart (1978)	Peak position
Australian Singles Chart	10

== Other versions ==
- 1967 – The Walker Brothers, single backed with the original b-side "Baby Make It Last the Time". It reached number 26 in the UK Singles Chart. It was the group's final UK single before their first split.
- 1973 – featured on the television show The Partridge Family, single released in Canada, England, and other parts of Europe backed with "Together We're Better". This version reached number 10 on the UK Singles Chart.
- 1978 – non-album single by the female-led Australian rock group Cheetah, reaching number 10 on the Australian Singles Chart.
