= Sunday and Me =

Single by Jay and the Americans

from the album Sunday and Me
- B-side: "Through This Doorway"
- Released: 1965
- Genre: Rock
- Length: 2:20
- Label: United Artists
- Songwriter: Neil Diamond
- Producer: Gerry Granahan

Jay and the Americans singles chronology
"Some Enchanted Evening" (1965)	"Sunday and Me" (1965)	"Why Can't You Bring Me Home" (1966)

"Sunday and Me" is a song written by Neil Diamond and recorded by Jay and the Americans in 1965. The song went to No. 18 on the Billboard Hot 100 in 1965 and was on the charts for 8 weeks.

The song went to No. 19 in Canada in December 1965 and was on the charts for 6 weeks.

"Sunday and Me" was the first songwriting success for Neil Diamond.
