= Jay Traynor =

American singer (1943–2014)

Background information
- Born: John Traynor; March 30, 1943; Brooklyn, New York City, U.S.
- Died: January 2, 2014 (aged 70) Tampa, Florida, U.S.
- Occupations: Pop, doo-wop
- Instrument: vocals
- Years active: 1960s–2014

John "Jay" Traynor (March 30, 1943 – January 2, 2014) was an American singer.

== Career ==
Traynor was the third lead vocalist of the Mystics, singing falsetto on "The White Cliffs of Dover", and lead on "Somewhere Over the Rainbow" and "Blue Star". Later, he started Jay and the Americans with Kenny Vance and Sandy Deanne, and was the original lead singer. He sang lead on the group's first hit, "She Cried", which was followed up by the album She Cried. All recordings were produced by Jerry Leiber & Mike Stoller.

Traynor left the Americans, releasing solo records, including "I Rise, I Fall" on the Coral label in 1964. His name on the label was denoted as "JAY ... formerly of Jay & the Americans". Later in the 1960s, he released "Up & Over", produced by Dennis Lambert for Don Costa Productions. The song became a big hit with the UK Northern Soul underground dance clubs. Traynor was replaced in the Americans by David Blatt, who agreed to perform under the stage name Jay Black. After working for Woodstock Ventures, the company that put on the Woodstock festival, Traynor began a career working behind the scenes with such 1970s acts as Mountain, West, Bruce & Laing, The Who, Ten Years After, Yes, and gospel singer Mylon LeFevre.

In 1977, Traynor moved to Albany, New York, near his roots in Greenville and worked at WNYT as a studio camera operator. While in Albany, he trained for and received his black belt in Tae Kwon Do. He then performed with cover bands (George and "Friends"), jazz trios, and finally as the singer with the Joey Thomas Big Band, where his love for Frank Sinatra's music began. The Big Band put out a few CDs with Traynor, including Live On WAMC & The Sinatra Show. In 2006, Traynor received a call from Jay Siegel, and he toured with Jay Siegel's Tokens for the remainder of his life.

== Death ==
Traynor died on January 2, 2014, of liver cancer at a hospital in Tampa, Florida, at the age of 70.
