= Jonathan Prince =

American actor (b. 1958)

- Born: Jonathan Alexander Prince; August 16, 1958 (age 68); Beverly Hills, California
- Occupations: Actor; director; screenwriter; movie producer
- Years active: 1981–present
- Spouse: Julie Warner (m. 1995; div. 2010)

Jonathan Alexander Prince (born August 16, 1958) is an American actor, director, screenwriter and movie producer.

== Career ==
Prince embarked on an acting career following graduation from Harvard University. He played Leo in the 1981 CBS series Mr. Merlin, Roy in the 1983 sex comedy Private School and Zach Armstrong in the 1986 syndicated sitcom Throb. He also hosted The Quiz Kids Challenge in 1990. Prince said he decided to expand into other aspects of show business while working on Mr. Merlin. Prince's next break came when George Burns asked him to co-write and produce Burns' feature film 18 Again!. That led to a job as consultant on the Whatever Became of...? television specials, where Prince met Dick Clark.

The meeting with Dick Clark led to the creation of American Dreams, set in the period 1963–1967 and tracking the lives of one Catholic family. Clark's American Bandstand is a key part of the story, as each episode incorporates musical performances from the show. Prince is listed as the creator and an executive producer. Prince negotiated with advertisers like Kraft Foods and Campbell's to place its products into the show. For example, one of his characters participated in Campbell Soup's essay writing contest in a continuing story line.

After American Dreams was not renewed by NBC, Prince signed a development deal with the branded entertainment firm, Madison Road Entertainment, in 2005. He wrote the script for Holidaze: The Christmas That Almost Didn't Happen, which featured marketers Wal-Mart, Coca-Cola Co. and Campbell's Soup.

In 2021, Prince and film producer Peter Samuelson started the company, Philmco, to produce movies and TV shows with a built-in philanthropic component.

== Personal life ==
Prince was married to actress Julie Warner from 1995 until 2010. He graduated Beverly Hills High School in 1976, and is a member of its Alumni Hall of Fame.
