= Contract on Cherry Street =

1977 television film

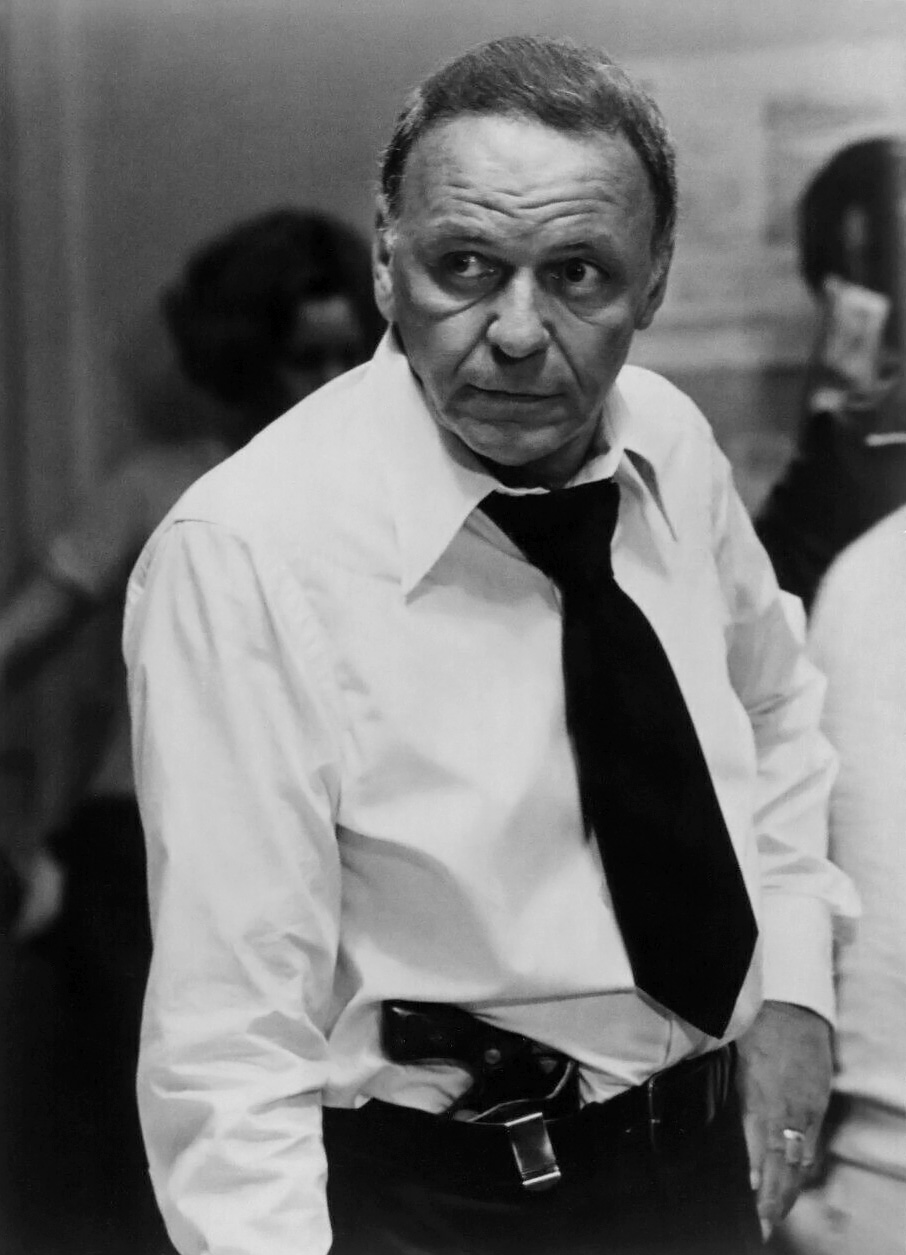
- Publicity photo of Frank Sinatra
- Genre: Crime; Drama; Thriller
- Based on: Contract on Cherry Street by Philip Rosenberg (as Phillip Rosenberg)
- Screenplay by: Edward Anhalt
- Directed by: William A. Graham
- Starring: Frank Sinatra; Martin Balsam; Jay Black
- Theme music composer: Jerry Goldsmith
- Country of origin: United States
- Original language: English

Production
- Executive producer: Renée Valente
- Producer: Hugh Benson
- Production locations: New York City; Hackensack, New Jersey
- Cinematography: Jack Priestley
- Editor: Eric Albertson
- Running time: 145 min.
- Production companies: Artanis Productions Inc. Columbia Pictures Television

Original release
- Network: NBC
- Release: November 19, 1977

1977 TV Guide promotional advertisement

Contract on Cherry Street is a 1977 American made-for-television crime film adaptation of a novel written by Phillip Rosenberg about a New York City police detective, produced by Frank Sinatra's production company Artanis for Columbia Pictures Television and starring Sinatra.

Directed by William A. Graham and produced by Hugh Benson, Renee Valente and Sinatra, Contract on Cherry Street was trumpeted as a major event that garnered positive reviews and strong ratings when it premiered on NBC on November 19, 1977.

The role of Detective Inspector Frank Hovannes was Sinatra's first acting role in seven years. The film was shot on location in New York City and New Jersey over a period of three months. The book on which the film was based was said to be a favorite of Sinatra's mother Dolly, who had been recently killed in an airplane crash near Palm Springs. This was the only television film in which Sinatra played the lead.

== Plot ==
When his partner is gunned down by the mob, Frank Hovannes, a detective inspector with the New York City Police Department, wants to lead his organized-crime unit against those responsible. Legal and departmental restrictions inhibit him, so Hovannes decides to take the matter into his own hands.

A vigilante act, a contract hit against one of the crime syndicate's members, is designed to stir the mob into action so that Hovannes and his men can catch them in the act. He runs into strong objections from his superiors, and trouble from his own team, along the way.

== Cast ==
- Frank Sinatra as Inspector Frank Hovannes
- Martin Balsam as Captain Weinberg
- Martin Gabel as Waldman
- Verna Bloom as Emily Hovannes
- Harry Guardino as Polito
- Marco St. John as Marzano
- Henry Silva as Roberto Obregon
- Joe De Santis as Seruto
- Jay Black as Sindardos
- Addison Powell as Halloran
- Michael Nouri as Lou Savage
- Richard Ward as Kittens
- Johnny Barnes as Washington
- Lenny Montana as Phil Lombardi
- Robert Davi as Mickey Sinardos
- Phil Rubenstein as Deli Clark
- Murray Moston as Richie Saint

== Critical reception ==
Sinatra made the cover of TV Guide as press for a special that would air over two consecutive nights on NBC gathered steam. After airing, renowned critic Leonard Maltin would comment: "Sinatra's first TV movie has him well cast as a NYC police officer who takes on organized crime in his own fashion after his partner is gunned down. Aces to this fine thriller." Judith Crist, however, would question why Sinatra was starring in a "mealy-mouthed morality tale", although most reviews were positive.

Contract on Cherry Street was nominated for Best TV Feature/Miniseries at the 1978 Edgar Awards.
