= Wes Farrell =

American musician, songwriter, and record producer (1939–1996)

- Born: Wesley Donald Farrell; December 21, 1939; New York City, U.S.
- Died: February 29, 1996 (aged 56); Coconut Grove, Florida, U.S.
- Occupations: Musician; songwriter; record producer
- Spouses: Joan Arthurs (m. 1965; div. 1972) Tina Sinatra (m. 1974; div. 1976) Pamela Hensley (m. 1978; div. 1980) Jean Inman (m. 1981)
- Children: 3

Wesley Donald Farrell (December 21, 1939 – February 29, 1996) was an American musician, songwriter and record producer, who was most active in the 1960s and 1970s.

== Career ==
Farrell was born in New York, United States. Farrell's catalogue includes close to 500 songs that he wrote, produced and/or published. One of his earliest successes, "Boys" (co-written with Luther Dixon), appeared on the B-side of the Shirelles' 1960 number-one hit "Will You Love Me Tomorrow", and in 1963 was covered by the Beatles for their debut album Please Please Me. Farrell's biggest chart hit as a composer – the McCoys' 1965 US number one "Hang On Sloopy" (a reworking of "My Girl Sloopy", co-written with Bert Russell) – remains one of the most performed songs in the history of popular music, according to the RIAA. In 1985, Hang On Sloopy became the official state rock song of the State of Ohio.

Other Farrell pop hits include the Animals' UK debut single "Baby Let Me Take You Home" (co-written with Bert Russell; no. 21, 1964) and two 1964 releases for Jay and the Americans: "Come a Little Bit Closer" (co-written with songwriters Tommy Boyce and Bobby Hart; US no. 3) and "Let's Lock the Door (And Throw Away the Key)" (with Roy Alfred; US no 11 in early 1965). Farrell also co-wrote "Come and Take a Ride in My Boat" (with Jerry Goldstein), slightly reworked in 1967 to provide Every Mother's Son with their signature hit "Come on Down to My Boat" (US no. 6). He also co-wrote (with Larry Kusik and Ritchie Adams) the song "Happy Summer Days", a US no. 27 hit for Ronnie Dove in 1966.

Farrell's Top 40 hit "Look What You've Done" — first recorded in 1966 by the Pozo Seco Singers — appears on Carla Olson's 2013 album Have Harmony, Will Travel as a duet with Rob Waller (of I See Hawks In L.A.).

In 1966, Farrell wrote the theme song for Gammera the Invincible (aka Gamera), the American cut of the first Gamera film .

Farrell first achieved success as a producer in the summer of 1968 with the Cowsills' US Top Ten hit "Indian Lake", written by Tony Romeo. He produced three other tracks for the family act, including "Poor Baby" (US no. 44) and "The Path of Love", both also written by Romeo.

Farrell was hired to produce the music for the recordings featured on the ABC-TV musical sitcom The Partridge Family, about a familial singing group loosely based on the Cowsills. The 1970–74 series starred Shirley Jones and featured David Cassidy, both of whom sang (especially Cassidy) on nearly all of the tracks associated with the project. Farrell co-wrote not only the theme song, "When We're Singin'" (with Diane Hildebrand), but also 30 songs spread across the Partridge Family's eight studio albums, seven of which he produced. Partridge Family hits co-written by Farrell which charted on Billboard's Hot 100 include "Doesn't Somebody Want to Be Wanted" (with Jim Cretecos and Mike Appel; no. 6, 1971) and "I'll Meet You Halfway" (with Gerry Goffin; no. 9, 1971). Notable album tracks include "I Can Feel Your Heartbeat" (with Jim Cretecos and Mike Appel), "Brand New Me" (with Eddie Singleton), "I'm Here, You're Here" and "There's No Doubt in My Mind" (both with Gerry Goffin), "One Night Stand" (with Paul Anka), "Echo Valley 2-6809" (with Kathy Cooper and Rupert Holmes), "Twenty-Four Hours a Day" (with Danny Janssen), "Love Is All That I Ever Needed" (with David Cassidy), "Hello, Hello" (with Tony Romeo) and "Something New Got Old" (with Bobby Hart). Unlike the Cowsills, who actually performed on their own recordings, the albums produced under the name of the Partridge Family featured mostly session musicians now known as the Wrecking Crew, with backing vocals by the Ron Hicklin Singers.

Farrell also produced material for Elephant's Memory, whose songs "Jungle Gym at the Zoo" and Old Man Willow feature in the 1969 movie Midnight Cowboy. He also produced two mid-1970s albums for British singer Lulu.

Farrell founded Chelsea Records in 1972.

== Personal life ==
In 1965, he married Joan Arthurs, and they had a daughter. Farrell and Arthurs divorced in 1972. He was married to actress/singer Tina Sinatra (daughter of Frank) in 1974, and to actress Pamela Hensley in 1978; both marriages ended in divorce. Farrell was later married to real estate broker Jean Inman and had two children.

Farrell died of cancer aged 56 in 1996 in Coconut Grove, Florida.
