= Artie Ripp =

American music industry executive and record producer (born 1940)

- Born: Arthur Marcus Ripp; October 29, 1940 (age 85); Brooklyn, New York City, New York, U.S.
- Occupations: Record producer, recording engineer, music executive, composer, songwriter, performer
- Years active: 1958–present
- Labels: Fidelity Recording, Family Productions, Kama Sutra, Buddah, MGM, United Artists, Columbia, Warner Bros., Verve, Hear Music, Casablanca
- Website: artieripp.com

Arthur Marcus Ripp (born 1940) is an American music industry executive and record producer.

== Career ==
=== Early career ===
Ripp began his career as a singer, initially informally harmonizing rock and roll songs with friends from high school. In 1957, Ripp formed an official singing group with neighborhood friends; the group was signed by ABC-Paramount Records as backup singers for ABC solo artists. The singers sang backup for Paul Anka on his 1957 hit "Diana" and broke up shortly thereafter.

Ripp rejoined with some of his informal singing partners (Mario "Skippy" Scarpa, Stu Silverman, and Joe Tedesco) to form "The Four Temptations". The quartet wrote its own songs and was signed by ABC-Paramount Records, which released the group's first single in 1958. The A-side, "Cathy" (named after Scarpa's newly born niece), was written by Scarpa and Ripp; the B-side was "Rock & Roll Baby", written by Scarpa, Ripp, and Silverman. When the group rejected opportunities offered by the record company to record others' songs, the record company withheld further recording opportunities, and the group disbanded.

Ripp shifted from performing to being behind-the-scenes in the music business. About his potential as a performer, Ripp states, "I sucked. I was no Elvis Presley and I wasn't a writer." Additionally, Ripp states, "I started walking around Broadway and I'd see these kids who were making records and not getting paid. They could have a number one record on the charts and end up owing the record company a half a million dollars ... I thought, 'This business has some system.' ..."

In 1958, Ripp targeted George Goldner to be a potential mentor. Goldner, based in New York City, was a music industry entrepreneur who owned copyrights, produced records, and owned record companies. Goldner was, in the words of American blues singer and songwriter Jerome "Doc" Pomus, a "very hip, New York kind of tough guy." After Ripp spent weeks informally observing Goldner at work, Goldner formally hired Ripp to be a go-fer.

Ripp worked with songwriter and producer Richard Barrett within Goldner's organization, where Ripp got a "street education in the record business equal to none". Ripp learned how Goldner worked a studio, structured a record contract, and got records played on the radio.

Functioning as manager instead of performer, Ripp put together the New York vocal group "The Temptations", (formed at least a year before the name was used by the different and better-known Motown group). Ripp's Temptations recorded for Goldner's Goldisc Records; its three singles were released in 1960 and 1961. The song "Barbara" charted nationally, reaching number 29 on the Billboard Hot 100 in the spring of 1960.

Ripp quickly rose in the music publishing, recording, and distribution business. In 1961, after Goldner transferred his Gone and End record labels to music industry executive Morris Levy, Ripp became national promotion director at Nevins/Kirshner Associates, Inc., founded by Al Nevins and Don Kirshner. (The company was the parent of Dimension Records and its music publishing division Aldon Music (BMI). Aldon, located at 1650 Broadway in Manhattan, played a significant role in shaping the so-called "Brill Building Pop" sound of the late 1950s and early 1960s.) In 1962, Ripp partnered with music publisher Aaron "Goldie" Goldmark and was named vice president of three of Goldmark's newly established businesses: Goldie Records, Inc., Armada Music, Inc. (ASCAP), and Fredella Music, Inc. (BMI) (which were together known as Goldmark Music, Ltd. in association with Chappell, Ltd.). During the summer of 1962, Goldmark and Ripp collaborated to generate worldwide distribution arrangements that were described by Billboard as having "angles never before achieved in the business."

In 1963, Ripp produced "Just One Look" for Doris Troy. The song peaked at number ten on the Billboard pop chart and at number three on the Rhythm and Blues chart. It was listed as one of the 7,500 most important songs of the Rock-n-Roll era and was covered by The Hollies as their first single.

In 1963, when Goldmark was selected to head Premier Albums' newly established publishing and master-production operations, Ripp followed and was named chief of "A&R" (Artists and Repertoire) for Premier's subsidiary, Award Music, which was the master-production business. As A&R Chief, Ripp signed singer Carl Dobkins Jr. Also under contract with Award during Ripp's tenure were Jimmy Jones and The Hollywood Flames, both of whom were on the Vee-Jay record label.

=== Kama Sutra ===
In 1964, Ripp joined Hy Mizrahi and Phil Steinberg in Kama Sutra, initially an independent production company based in New York. As a production house, the company established a "consistent and impressive track record" in the singles market; Kama Sutra hit "immediately and often."

Ripp's work included an association and collaboration with the songwriting-and-production team of Jerry Leiber and Mike Stoller, who had co-founded the Red Bird Records label with Goldner in 1964. In 1964, Red Bird released "Remember (Walkin' In The Sand)", which became a hit for the girl group The Shangri-Las; Ripp is credited with having "discovered" the group and shares a producer credit with Jeff Barry on the song. (American singer-songwriter Billy Joel, whom Ripp as a future record-label owner would sign to a recording contract about seven years later, recalls playing piano on the single; whether his playing was used on the demo version that had been produced by "Shadow" Morton or on the master version that had been produced by Barry and Ripp is unclear.) Also, when Leiber and Stoller's time-consuming work with The Drifters and The Coasters demanded much of their attention, Ripp was selected to take over production of singles for Jay and the Americans, released on United Artists. When the band "hit" in 1964 with the Ripp-produced "Come A Little Bit Closer", the band was invited to participate in the first Beatles' tour of the U.S. along with The Righteous Brothers and also played with The Rolling Stones at Carnegie Hall.

Although Kama Sutra signed a major production contract in early 1965 with record label Columbia Records (with whom Ripp as principal of Family Productions would later negotiate regarding control of Billy Joel's contract in the 1970s), its primary and most significant distribution deal, established in mid-1965, was with MGM.

In 1965, after accountant Art Kass (a former employee of MGM Records) joined the management team, Kama Sutra expanded and became a record label, with Ripp as musical director. It opened a location in California, which was becoming the center of American popular music production. The west coast office was ultimately headed by Bob Krasnow; Ripp shifted to operate out of California in 1967. The label's first single, produced by Ripp, was The Vacels' "You're My Baby (And Don't You Forget It)", which peaked at 63 on the Billboard Hot 100 chart on August 21, 1965. Ripp also negotiated a deal with the production team that handled The Lovin' Spoonful; it is said that the band carried the label through its first year.

In 1966, Ripp and his two co-principals negotiated a deal with Ashley Famous Agency (AFA) for AFA to act as the exclusive booker for the majority of Kama Sutra's artists and all its writers and producers.

Ripp co-produced Bobby Bloom's single, "Love, Don't Let Me Down" which was released on Kama Sutra KA 223 in March 1967. It made both the Record World Coming Up, and the Cash Box Looking Ahead chart.

=== Buddah Records ===
In 1967, Kama Sutra leadership, sensing that the MGM distribution deal was limiting the company's output, created the Buddah Records label as a subsidiary with distribution handled by Kama Sutra. Neil Bogart, who later co-founded Casablanca Records, was hired as vice president and general manager. Staff writers and producers included Peter Anders and Vini Poncia (who had created hits for The Ronettes), Bo Gentry and Ritchie Cordell (associated with Tommy James and the Shondells), Levine and Resnick, Elliot Chiprut, and Bobby Bloom. Bogart steered the label in the direction of Bubblegum pop, and the label had hits with Ohio Express and the 1910 Fruitgum Company. At its first anniversary in 1968, Buddah was ranked seventh in the U.S. in sales of singles; the company's estimated first-year sales were $5.8 million.

In 1968, Viewlex, a Long Island, New York company that made projectors and slides primarily for the school market, acquired Buddah by purchasing all its stock, and the three original partners (Ripp, Mizrahi, and Steinberg) left. When Bubblegum's appeal faded, so did Buddah's fortunes; parent company Viewlex went bankrupt in 1976. Buddah changed ownership and continued to release new music until 1983. In 1986, Buddah and its back catalogue were sold, and, through a series of acquisitions, Buddah—since renamed "Buddha"—became a reissue label owned by Sony Music Entertainment.

Together, the Kama Sutra and Buddah labels released almost 100 Billboard Top 40 singles and almost fifty hits on the Billboard Rhythm & Blues chart. This productivity amounted to about one chart hit for every five releases; major record labels of the day realized about one chart hit for every twenty to thirty releases.

=== Family Productions ===
After obtaining financial backing and a promise of logistical backing from Ampex and Famous Music Corp., which was the music publishing division of Paramount Pictures which was itself a subsidiary of Gulf + Western, Ripp founded Family Productions, Inc.--originally called "A. Ripp Family Productions--in 1970. The agreement included a "built-in promotion fund" and a commitment from Paramount to promote the output from the production house. The company's logo was an image of the Capitoline Wolf.

==== Association with Billy Joel ====
In 1971, Family Productions signed 22-year-old Billy Joel to a long-term recording-and-publishing contract as a solo artist. Joel had previously come to the attention of producer Michael Lang, co-creator of Woodstock and principal of Just Sunshine Records. Lang had given Joel a monetary advance, but then passed Joel along to Ripp—while still retaining rights to profit from Joel's output—because he wanted to focus his attentions on a different artist instead. Ripp produced Joel's first solo album Cold Spring Harbor, and Paramount distributed it. Jon Troy, an early Joel manager, was promotions director at Family Productions.

Despite the occurrence of a mastering error that altered its pitch, Cold Spring Harbor showed critical promise but was a commercial failure; distribution was poor, and promotion was insufficient. Joel states, "We [including touring bandmates Rhys Clark, Larry Russell, and Alan Hertzberg] didn't make any money, nobody got paid. We were touring around in one of these little camper trailer things, eating peanut butter and jelly sandwiches." While Joel has blamed the failure of Cold Spring Harbor on Ripp, stating, for example, that Ripp had run out of money to fix the mastering error, Ripp states that he spent $450,000 in developing Joel. Others describe parent company Gulf + Western's commitment to music production and distribution as having been lackluster; Joel biographer Fred Schruers describes the organization having been "too dysfunctional to do the kind of marketing and promotion that would trigger really profitable album sales." Later, in 1974, when Gulf + Western sold Paramount's subsidiary Famous—and thus the majority of Famous' labels—to ABC Records, a Famous Music employee stated, "Frankly, I don't think Gulf & Western really wanted to be in the music business. They were never particularly enthusiastic about it and the picture company [Paramount] was making an awful lot more money than we were."

The relationship between Joel and Ripp deteriorated, and in 1972, Joel jumped ship to Columbia Records. In exchange for releasing Joel from his contract with Family, Ripp agreed to receive about four percent - then 28 cents - of the retail price of each sale of Joel's first ten albums released with Columbia; Lang agreed to receive about two percent. The Capitoline Wolf logo from Family Productions continued to appear on Joel's albums for a period of time. Ripp retained publishing rights until Walter Yetnikoff, head of Columbia in the 1970s and 1980s, bought them and gave them to Joel as a birthday gift in 1978. Yetnikoff had to threaten Ripp to obtain the rights.

=== Fidelity Recording ===
In 1971, Ripp founded Fidelity Recording, a Studio City, California recording studio. In 1976, Fidelity's Studio B was where The Runaways, an all-female rock band which included a young Joan Jett, recorded the punk-influenced hard rock single "Cherry Bomb". Band manager Kim Fowley describes Studio B as being "a remade storeroom...It was awful. But it wasn't scary. It was the kind of studio you wanted a garage product out of...[If] you walk into a room where they store stuff, you're not going to be intimidated. You're going to swagger about: ‘What a horrible place. Oh, well, we've played a lot of horrible places. This is nothing new.’” Ripp describes Studio B as being convertible from a different use into a studio when need be. He states, "...there was an intimacy in the room and there was a sound that was tight and alive, despite its lack of, shall we say, visual amenities.” Fowley states that the practice at Fidelity was "...no guests. No visitors. No parents, no record company, nothing. We were at war. We didn't have time to entertain in the foxhole. No drugs or alcohol either. Fast food. You always play obnoxious rock 'n' roll when you eat bad fast food.”

Fidelity is where the soundtrack of a Hanna-Barbera production in The Cat in the Hat franchise was recorded in 1981. The studio is also where Ripp and Woodstock-planner Artie Kornfeld re-mixed Survivor's Premonition album in 1981, although the group's founding member Jim Peterik states that he and others did a final mix. Fidelity is also where Ripp and engineer Larry Elliot substantially overdubbed and re-mixed Joel's Cold Spring Harbor album in 1983; the remix was reissued by Columbia. Other artists who recorded work at Fidelity include Mandrill, Melanie, Peter Yarrow, and Gábor Szabó. In 2002, Ripp sold the studio to Tom Weir, who renamed it Studio City Sound and went on to win a 2004 Grammy Award for mixing the year's Best Reggae Album, True Love.

=== Later career ===
Ripp has been the principal of Ripp Entertainment Group, Inc. since 1977. Additionally, Ripp established the Home Grown Music, Inc. (BMI) publishing company in 1979, and in 1980, Ripp established the Ripparthur Music, Inc. (ASCAP) publishing company, thereby controlling many aspects of music production: publishing companies, a production company, and a recording studio. Neither Home Grown Music nor Ripparthur Music remains an independent entity. In the late 2000s, Ripp Entertainment Group was named the exclusive distributor of the short-lived DVCD+ digital storage technology, which Ripp co-invented and which became available in 2008. In 2014, he established Artful Results, Inc., (now dissolved).

Ripp has also had a career in other media outlets as a film actor, film producer, and consultant. In the 1978 film American Hot Wax, a biopic about disc jockey Alan Freed that was directed by Floyd Mutrux, Ripp played Freed's manager and talent scout. He also played "Rotweiler" in the 1987 movie "Number One With a Bullet," starring Valerie Bertinelli. Ripp served as a consultant on the development of the play Baby It's You!, co-written by Mutrux and music journalist Colin Escott, about the life and music industry career of housewife-turned-record-label-founder Florence Greenberg. The play opened on Broadway in 2011, and its lead actress, Beth Leavel, was nominated for a 2011 Tony Award for Best Performance by an Actress in a Leading Role in a Musical for her performance as Greenberg. In addition, Ripp served as Music Consultant on the 2014 film "Everly", starring Salma Hayek.

=== Controversies ===
While he was with Family Productions, Ripp allegedly had "an industry reputation of taking advantage of acts he signed." For example, musician Neil Merryweather says of the eponymous album his "Heavy Cruiser" band put out, "Artie made a chunk of money and we never made a dime. But that's the way it was the whole time we were with Family Productions." Merryweather also describes an incident in which a Family employee withheld plane tickets from his "Mama Lion" band unless the band signed a contract. Merryweather says, "This extortion/squeeze play thing was typical of Family Productions." The long-term deal Ripp signed with Billy Joel in 1971 serves as another example; its terms have been described as being so severe as to almost "deprive Joel of the right to earn a living." Joel calls it "a horrible deal," stating, "I signed away everything – the copyrights, publishing, record royalties, everything. My first child. I gave it all away..."

About the Cold Spring Harbor album, which Ripp produced in 1971, Joel states, "The whole thing was completely overproduced." Joel recalls that making the album had been "a torturous process" and that it had been "misery" working with Ripp.

Nevertheless, despite these difficulties and others, Joel gives Ripp credit as having been "the guy who got me on the radar screen." Joel states, "After all the people in the industry who passed on me, Artie Ripp was the guy who wanted me to be his artist. Nobody else heard it, nobody else wanted to sign me, nobody else was making me a deal. Artie made me a deal. He heard something."

== Persona ==
Former Rolling Stones manager and producer Andrew Loog Oldham describes Ripp's persona as being well-suited to Manhattan's rough-and-tumble world that was the hustling epicenter of American popular music production in the early 1960s; Ripp could slickly persuade his listener to believe in any song he was working on. In 1980, Ripp was filmed driving his Excalibur kit car in a segment about Billy Joel that was produced for the 20/20 television newsmagazine.

== Personal life ==
Ripp was married to Phyllis Ripp, who died in 1993. He has two children. His son Adam Ripp is the co-writer and director of the film Gang Tapes. In March 2022, it was announced that Adam Ripp would be working with a film studio to write and direct a biopic about Billy Joel's early career. The elder Ripp is one of the producers of the film.

== Selected credits ==
=== Films ===
==== Executive Music Producer ====
- Lost Stallions: The Journey Home (2008)

==== Executive producer ====
- Gang Tapes (2001)
- Meet the Deedles (1998)

=== Music ===
==== Executive producer ====
Albums

- Sailor Moon - Songs from the Hit TV Series (Rhino Records) (1996)
- Sailor Moon & The Scouts - Lunarock (Rhino Records) (1999)

Singles

- "Sixteen Tons" and "Sixteen Tons (Instrumental)" (covered by Eric Burdon) (Empire Records) (1990)

==== Producer ====
Albums

- Sophisticated Boom Boom: The Shadow Morton Story (Ace Records Import) (2013)
- China Beach: Music and Memories (SBK Records) (1990) (co-producer)
- Premonition by Survivor (1981)
- Cold Spring Harbor by Billy Joel (Family Productions) (1971)
- Times That Try a Man's Soul by Kyle (Paramount Records) (1971) (and director)
- Rock & Roll Is Here to Stay! by Sha Na Na (1969)

Singles

- "She's Got a Way" by Billy Joel (Family Productions) (1971)
- "Everybody Loves You Now by Billy Joel (Family Productions) (1971)
- "Chantilly Lace" by Sha Na Na (1970) (Kama Sutra Records)
- "Remember Then" by Sha Na Na (1970) (Kama Sutra Records)
- "What's Yesterday" by Tony Bruno (Capitol) (1968)
- "Small Town, Bring Down" by Tony Bruno (Capitol) (1968)
- "To Be With You" by Vince Edwards (1967) (Kama Sutra Records) (co-produced with Anders and Poncia)
- "Nylon Stockings" by Vince Edwards (1967) (Kama Sutra Records) (co-produced with Anders and Poncia)
- "A Lifetime Lovin' You" by Vic Dana (1967) (Kama Sutra Records)
- "Bad Misunderstanding" by The Critters (Kapp Records) (a Kama-Sutra production) (1966) (co-produced with Anders and Poncia)
- "Mr. Dieingly Sad" by The Critters (Kapp Records) (a Kama Sutra production) (1966)
- "Younger Girl" by The Critters (Kapp Records) (a Kama Sutra production) (1966)
- "Splendor in the Grass" by Boys (Metric) (a Kama Sutra production) (1965)
- "Think of the Good Times" by Jay and the Americans (United Artists Records) (a Kama Sutra production) (1965)
- "Who Are You" by Stacey Cane (Jubilee) (a Kama Sutra production) (1965) (co-produced with Mizrahi and Steinberg)
- "In The Night" by Freddy Cannon (Warner Bros. Records) (a Kama Sutra production) (1965)
- "Let's Lock The Door (And Throw Away The Key)" by Jay and the Americans (United Artists Records) (a Leiber-Stoller production) (1964)
- "Come A Little Bit Closer" by Jay and the Americans (United Artists Records) (a Leiber-Stoller production) (1964)
- "Goodbye Boys Goodbye (Ciao Ragazi Ciao)" by Jay and the Americans (United Artists Records) (a Leiber-Stoller production) (1964)
- "Remember (Walking in the Sand)" by the Shangri-Las (Red Bird Records) (a Leiber-Stoller-Goldner production) (1964)
- "Just One Look" by Doris Troy (1963)

Video Collections

- Various titles, 12-title collection culled from the Shindig television series, (1991-Rhino Records) (1992-Vintage Records) (co-produced with Trisha Wexler)

==== Director ====
Albums

- "Born to Be" by Melanie (Safka) (Buddah Records (1968)

Singles

- "I'm Back in Town" by Melanie (Safka) (Buddah Records) (1968)
- "Animal Crackers" by Melanie (Safka) (Buddah Records) (1968)

==== Songwriter ====
- "The Light in Your Window" (with Carole King and Gerry Goffin) (Columbia) (produced by Nevins-Kirshner Associates Inc.) (1961)
- "Blessed Be" (1958)
- "Cathy" by The [New York] Temptations (Goldisc Records) (1958)
- "Rock & Roll Baby" by The [New York] Temptations (Goldisc Records) (1958)

=== Television appearances ===
- The Merv Griffin Show (1971)

== Notes ==
- As part of his "Off the Record ..." series of interviews with music industry icons, Joe Smith (formerly the chief executive officer of Capitol/EMI Records), interviewed Ripp on March 14, 1986. This article's quotations of Ripp originally came from this recording. Complete and unedited recordings of these interviews are available in the U.S. through interlibrary loan from the Library of Congress.
