= Wax Museum (Jay and the Americans album) =

Studio album by Jay and The Americans
- Released: February 28, 1970
- Recorded: A&R Studios, New York City
- Genre: Pop
- Label: United Artists
- Producer: Jay and the Americans, Thomas Kaye

Jay and The Americans chronology
Sands of Time (1969)	Wax Museum (1970)	Wax Museum, Vol. 2 (1970)

Singles from Wax Museum, Vol. 1
- 1. "Walking in the Rain" Released: November 1969

Professional ratings
Review scores
Source	Rating
Allmusic	3/5 stars

Wax Museum is the eighth studio album by Jay and the Americans released on February 28, 1970. The album went to #105 on the Billboard 200 chart, reached #68 on the Cashbox chart, and #71 in Canada. The album was the group's last charting album.

The group's cover of The Ronettes' song "Walkin' in the Rain" hit #19 on the Billboard Hot 100 in 1970, and #17 in Canada.

== Track listing ==
1. "Walkin' in the Rain" (Barry Mann, Phil Spector, Cynthia Weil)
2. "Do I Love You?" (Peter Andreoli, Vini Poncia, Phil Spector)
3. "Johnny B. Goode" (Chuck Berry)
4. "Message to Martha (Kentucky Bluebird)" (Burt Bacharach, Hal David)
5. "Room Full of Tears" (Doc Pomus, Mort Shuman)
6. "A Lover's Question" (Brook Benton, Jimmy T. Williams)
7. "Some Kind of Wonderful" (Gerry Goffin, Carole King)
8. "This Is My Love" (Billy Dawn Smith)
9. "Let It Be Me" (Gilbert Bécaud, Mann Curtis, Pierre Delanoë)
10. "I Don't Want to Cry" (Luther Dixon, Chuck Jackson)
11. "You Were on My Mind" (Sylvia Fricker)
12. "Lonely Teardrops" (Berry Gordy, Jr., Gwendolyn Gordy, Roquel "Billy" Davis)
