= Let's Lock the Door (And Throw Away the Key) =

Single by Jay and the Americans

from the album Blockbusters
- B-side: "I'll Remember You"
- Released: November 25, 1964
- Genre: Rock
- Length: 2:24
- Label: United Artists
- Songwriters: Roy Alfred, Wes Farrell
- Producer: Artie Ripp

Jay and the Americans singles chronology
"Come a Little Bit Closer" (1964)	"Let's Lock the Door (And Throw Away the Key)" (1964)	"Think of the Good Times" (1965)

"Let's Lock the Door (And Throw Away the Key)" is a song written by Roy Alfred and Wes Farrell and recorded by Jay and the Americans in 1964. The song went to No. 11 on the Billboard Hot 100 in 1965 and was on the charts for 10 weeks. The lyrics express the narrator's desire to make out in private with a woman he met at a party.

== Charts ==
Chart (1965)	Peak position
Canada Top Singles (RPM)	9
US Billboard Hot 100	11
US Cash Box	10
