= Ted Daryll =

American songwriter and record producer (1940–2021)

- Also known as: Teddy Daryll
- Born: Theodore Henry Meister; January 5, 1940; Mount Vernon, New York, U.S.
- Died: March 16, 2021 (aged 81) Akron, Ohio, U.S.
- Occupations: songwriter; record producer

Theodore Henry Meister (January 5, 1940 – March 16, 2021), known professionally as Ted Daryll, was an American songwriter and record producer.

Ted Meister was born in Mount Vernon, New York. While at Stepinac High School, he joined his friends Greg Gwardyak (later known professionally as Greg Richards) and Wes Voight (later known as Chip Taylor), to form a three-piece group, playing local venues. Meister played drums, but also learned guitar and started writing songs. He worked for a small songwriting company in New York City, and in 1962 had his first success, writing as Ted Daryll with Greg Richards, when their song "She Cried" was recorded by Jay and the Americans, and reached No.5 on the Hot 100 in 1962. The song was also recorded by the Shangri-Las (as "He Cried") and the Lettermen.

Daryll's later songwriting successes included "Good Times", recorded by Jerry Butler in 1965; "Country Girl - City Man", co-written with Chip Taylor and recorded by Billy Vera and Judy Clay; and "The Shadow of Your Love", recorded by the Five Stairsteps. The song "Good Times" was later recorded by the Persuasions, whose version was sampled by Jamie xx on his 2015 hit single "I Know There's Gonna Be (Good Times)". Daryll's songs were also recorded by Sarah Vaughan, Dusty Springfield, Etta James, Peggy Lee, and the Bobby Fuller Four, among others. In addition, he worked as a producer for artists including Peggy March, Zager and Evans, Rare Silk, Bud Shank, and Stan Kenton.

He died in Akron, Ohio, in 2021, aged 81.
