= Cara Mia =

Single by Jay and the Americans

from the album Blockbusters
- B-side: "When It's All Over"
- Released: May 1965
- Recorded: 1965
- Genre: Rock
- Length: 2:35
- Label: United Artists
- Songwriters: Lee Lange; Tulio Trapani
- Producer: Artie Ripp

Jay and the Americans singles chronology
"Think of the Good Times" (1965)	"Cara Mia" (1965)	"Some Enchanted Evening" (1965)

"Cara Mia" is a popular song published in 1954 that became a UK number 1, and US number 10 hit and Gold record for English singer David Whitfield in 1954, and a number 4 hit for the American rock group Jay and the Americans in 1965. The title means "my beloved" in Italian.

== Background ==
The English singer David Whitfield first recorded the song with the Mantovani Orchestra in 1954. It made the charts in the United States, and in the UK was the first record to spend ten consecutive weeks at number 1 on the UK Singles Chart. Whitfield's version was one of the biggest selling British records in the pre-rock days. It sold more than three and a half million copies worldwide and was a Top 10 hit in America.

== Writers ==
Authorship of the song was credited to Tulio Trapani (the pen name of the song's co-writer and arranger Mantovani) and Lee Lange (Bunny Lewis, Whitfield's producer).

== Jay and the Americans cover ==
Jay and the Americans recorded "Cara Mia" on their 1965 LP Blockbusters. It became an international Top 5 hit, reaching number 1 in Canada. Their version was re-released in 1980, and went into the charts in the Netherlands.

== Chart history ==
=== Weekly charts ===
Chart (1965)	Peak position
Canada RPM Top Singles	1
New Zealand (Lever Hit Parade)	3
Australia	5
U.S. Billboard Hot 100	4
U.S. Cash Box Top 100	4

=== Year-end charts ===
Chart (1965)	Rank
U.S. Billboard Hot 100	24
U.S. Cash Box	43

== Other notable remakes ==
- José Carreras
- Richard Clayderman - included in his album Love Songs of the World (1986).
- Helen Forrest - a single release in 1954.
- Mario del Monaco (with Mantovani and His Orchestra)
- Gordon MacRae - a single release in 1954.
- The Johnny Mann Singers
- Josef Locke
- Jaime Morey
- Frank Patterson
- Gene Pitney - included in his album Golden Greats (1967).
- Jack Pleis
- The Raes
- Nikolai Volkoff
- Slim Whitman - for his album Red River Valley (1977)
- Paul Delicato, a disco cover (1976) - U.S. AC #5, Canada AC #15
- Gene Ammons
