= This Magic Moment =

1960 song by The Drifters

Single by the Drifters
- B-side: "Baltimore"
- Released: January 28, 1960
- Recorded: December 23, 1959
- Studio: Bell Sound (New York City)
- Genre: R&B
- Length: 2:28
- Label: Atlantic
- Songwriters: Doc Pomus and Mort Shuman
- Producers: Jerry Leiber, Mike Stoller

The Drifters singles chronology
"(If You Cry) True Love, True Love"/"Dance with Me" (1959)	"This Magic Moment" (1960)	"Lonely Winds" (1960)

"This Magic Moment"

Single by Jay and the Americans

from the album Sands of Time
- A-side: "Since I Don't Have You"
- Released: October 28, 1968
- Recorded: October 16, 1968
- Studio: O.D.O. Recorders, New York City, N.Y.
- Genre: Blue-eyed soul
- Length: 3:03
- Label: United Artists
- Songwriters: Doc Pomus and Mort Shuman
- Producer: Jay and the Americans

Jay and the Americans singles chronology
"No Other Love" (1968)	"This Magic Moment" (1968)	"When You Dance" (1969)

"This Magic Moment" is a song composed by lyricist Doc Pomus and pianist Mort Shuman. It was first recorded by the Drifters, with Ben E. King singing lead.

== Original Drifters version ==
It was recorded first by Ben E. King and the Drifters, at Bell Sound Studios in New York City. The Drifters version spent 11 weeks on the Billboard Hot 100 and reached No. 16 on April 2, 1960.

== Charts ==
Chart (1960)	Peak position
US Billboard Hot 100	16
US R&B (Billboard)	4
US Cash Box Top 100	9
CAN (CHUM Charts Hit Parade)	20

== Jay and the Americans version ==
In 1968, Jay and the Americans released a version which became the song's most widely successful release. The record spent 14 weeks on the Billboard Hot 100, reaching No. 6 on March 1, 1969, landing at No. 1 on Canada's "RPM 100" and No. 11 on Billboard's Easy Listening chart. The song also debuted at No. 4 in the first issue of RPM's "Young Adult" adult contemporary chart. The single earned gold record status from the Recording Industry Association of America.

== Charts ==
=== Weekly charts ===
Chart (1968–69)	Peak position
Canada RPM Top Singles	1
Canada RPM Adult Contemporary	4
US Billboard Hot 100	6
US Adult Contemporary (Billboard)	11
US Cash Box Top 100	5

=== Year-end charts ===
Chart (1969)	Rank
Canada RPM Top Singles	25
US Billboard Hot 100	56
US Cash Box Top 100	25

== In popular culture ==
The original version of the song was used in the following productions:

- The Sandlot, the 1993 sports comedy film directed by David M. Evans
- "Soprano Home Movies", an episode of The Sopranos
- "This Magic Moment", a documentary film from ESPN's 30 for 30 about the Orlando Magic
- "Selena Gomez/Post Malone", an episode from the 47th season of Saturday Night Live, in a sketch about the invention of the whoopee cushion

Lou Reed's version, from a Doc Pomus tribute album, Till the Night is Gone, was featured in David Lynch's film Lost Highway (1997).

Rick James released a version of the song as a single as part of a medley with "Dance With Me" in 1989. It went to No. 74 on the U.S. R&B chart.
