= Come a Little Bit Closer =

Song by Jay and the Americans

Single by Jay and the Americans

from the album Come a Little Bit Closer
- B-side: "Goodbye Boys, Goodbye"
- Released: 1964
- Genre: Rock, pop
- Length: 2:49
- Label: United Artists
- Songwriters: Tommy Boyce, Bobby Hart, Wes Farrell
- Producer: Artie Ripp

Jay and the Americans singles chronology
"Come Dance with Me" (1963)	"Come a Little Bit Closer" (1964)	"Let's Lock the Door (And Throw Away the Key)" (1964)

"Come a Little Bit Closer"

Single by Johnny Duncan and Janie Fricke

from the album Come a Little Bit Closer
- B-side: "Loneliness (Can Break a Man's Heart)" (Duncan only)
- Released: October 1977
- Genre: Country
- Label: Columbia
- Songwriters: Tommy Boyce, Bobby Hart, Wes Farrell
- Producer: Billy Sherrill

Johnny Duncan singles chronology
"A Song in the Night" (1977)	"Come a Little Bit Closer" (1977)	"She Can Put Her Shoes Under My Bed (Anytime)" (1978)

Janie Fricke singles chronology
"What're You Doing Tonight" (1977)	"Come a Little Bit Closer" (1977)	"Baby It's You" (1978)

"Come a Little Bit Closer" is a song by the 1960s rock and roll band Jay and the Americans. It reached number 3 on the Billboard Hot 100 on November 21, 1964, making it the band's highest-charting single. It also peaked at number 4 on the Cashbox chart and at number 1 on RPM's singles chart, whilst in Australia it peaked at number 37 on the Kent Music Report. The song was their first top 5 recording in two years, since 1962's "She Cried". On the New Zealand Lever Hit Parade it peaked at number 4.

It was written by songwriters Tommy Boyce and Bobby Hart, as well as Wes Farrell, and became Boyce and Hart's first top 10 hit. The lyrics present a romance narrative: The narrator, an unnamed American, is visiting a café in Mexico, where a woman (also unnamed) flirts with him. He is aware that she is the girlfriend of a violent outlaw named José, but is so smitten that he cannot resist dancing with and even kissing her. Even after he hears the band mention that José is coming, he lingers with her. However, once José arrives, the narrator flees in terror. As he leaves, he overhears the woman say to José the same words she used to entice him, suggesting that she was only flirting with the narrator in order to spice up her relationship with José. The music uses a Latin rhythm to complement the story's setting.

Jay and the Americans also recorded a Spanish version of the song.

A cover version by American country music artists Johnny Duncan and Janie Fricke was released in 1977 and peaked at number four on the Billboard Hot Country Songs chart in January 1978.

== Chart performance ==
=== Charts ===
Chart (1960)	Peak position
Australia	37
New Zealand Lever Hit Parade	4
Canada RPM	1
Billboard Hot 100	3
Cash Box Top 100	4

== Certifications ==
Region	Certification	Certified units/sales
United Kingdom (BPI)	Silver	200,000^{‡}
^{‡} Sales+streaming figures based on certification alone.

== In other media ==
The song is featured in the 2017 film Guardians of the Galaxy Vol. 2.
