= Jay and the Americans =

1960s American vocal group

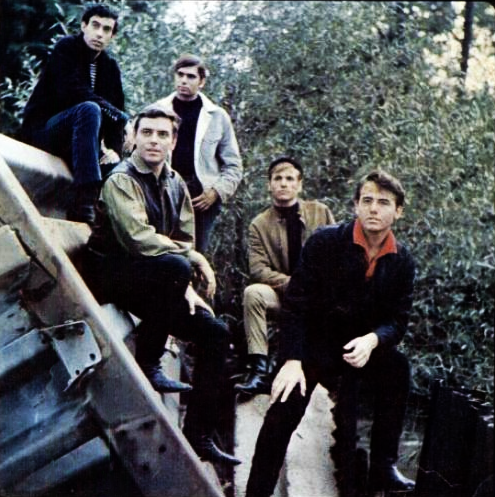
- Jay and the Americans in 1965. L-R: Kenny Vance, Sandy Deanne, Marty Sanders, Howard Kane, and Jay Black

Background information
- Origin: Belle Harbor, Queens, New York, United States
- Genres: Doo-wop, pop rock
- Years active: 1960–1973, 2006–present
- Label: United Artists
- Members: Sandy Deanne; Marty Sanders; Jay Reincke; Darren Dowler; Lenie Colacino
- Past members: John "Jay" Traynor; Kenny Vance; Howie Kane; Jay Black
- Website: jayandtheamericans.net

Jay and the Americans are an American vocal group who were popular in the 1960s. Their initial line-up consisted of John "Jay" Traynor, Howard "Howie" Kane, Kenny Vance, and Sandy Deanne, though their greatest success on the charts in the United States and Canada came after Traynor left and once Jay Black and Marty Sanders joined the group; Black replaced Traynor as lead singer. They were inducted into the Vocal Group Hall of Fame in 2002.

== Biography ==
=== Early years ===
Jay and the Americans had its roots in a vocal group called The Harborlites, which was formed in 1959 in Belle Harbor, Queens by Kenneth Rosenberg (who adopted the stage name Kenny Vance), Louis Sandy Yaguda (who adopted the stage name Sandy Deanne), Sydelle Sherman, Gail Sherman, Ritchie Graff, and Linda Kahn. After a failed audition for Stan Feldman, co-owner of Ivy Records, Gail Sherman, Graff, and Kahn all left The Harborlites. The remaining three members worked on their sound, re-auditioned for Feldman, and this time won a recording contract. The Harborlites scored a minor hit with "Is that Too Much to Ask", a song written by Deanne and with lead vocal by Sydelle Sherman, but Deanne and Vance decided they wanted to start an all-male vocal group. The initial line-up of this new group consisted of Deanne, Vance, John "Jay" Traynor, and Deanne's boyhood friend Howard Kirschenbaum (who adopted the stage name Howie Kane).

They auditioned for Leiber and Stoller, who gave the group its name. Specifically, Leiber and Stoller chose Binky Jones and the Americans, which the group tweaked to Jay and the Americans.

=== Career pinnacle ===
The group signed with United Artists Records, with which Leiber and Stoller had a production deal. Their first single, "Tonight", became a local hit, selling 45,000 copies in the New York area. Their second single, "Dawning", initially flopped, but six months after its release a disc jockey on the West Coast played the B-side, "She Cried" (a cover of a Ted Daryll song), for six hours straight, and listeners responded. With Jay Traynor singing lead, Jay and the Americans first hit the Billboard charts in 1962 with "She Cried", which reached No. 5. The next two singles did not fare as well, and Traynor left the group. Vocalist and guitarist Martin Joe Kupersmith joined Jay and the Americans, adopting the stage name Marty Sanders. Sanders had already been playing with Jay and the Americans on tour and on their debut LP. Sanders brought his bandmate from The Empires, David Black (né Blatt), in to take Traynor's place as lead vocalist (after David first agreed to adopt the stage name Jay Black), and Black sang lead for the rest of the group's major hits.

They recorded "Only in America", a song originally meant for The Drifters. It reached number 25 in Billboard, which was far short of the success of "She Cried", but a welcome return to the charts after the failure of their previous two singles. Other notable hits for Jay and the Americans were "Come a Little Bit Closer" in 1964, which hit No. 3, "Cara Mia", which peaked at No. 4, and "Let's Lock the Door (And Throw Away the Key)", which reached No. 11, in 1965. They also recorded a commercial for H.I.S. Slacks and a public service announcement for the Ad Council, featuring a backing track by Brian Wilson and Phil Spector. Two tracks from this era later found favor with the Northern Soul crowd: "Got Hung Up Along The Way" and "Living Above Your Head".

On February 11, 1964 Jay and the Americans were one of the four opening acts for The Beatles' first live show in the United States. They were also slated as an opening act for The Rolling Stones, on June 20, 1964, but due to the wild audience The Rolling Stones were switched to the openers for fear of a riot. By the end of the first song in Jay and the Americans' set, "Only in America", the venue was empty, with the entire audience having gone after the departing Rolling Stones. The incident has been called an illustration of the supplanting of vocal groups by rock bands.

In 1966, the group was featured in the Universal comedy film, Wild Wild Winter, singing "Two of a Kind" at the film's finale, with surf band The Astronauts depicted as providing backup instrumentals. As of February 2017, the song has been released only on the 1966 soundtrack LP.

Jay and the Americans branched out by founding JATA Enterprises (a name which was an acronym for Jay and the Americans), a production and publishing company.

In 1969, they recorded an album of their favorite oldies called Sands of Time, which included "This Magic Moment", which was originally done by the Drifters. The single went to No. 6 in early 1969. It sold over one million copies, and was awarded a gold disc by the R.I.A.A. in May 1969. A follow-up album, Wax Museum, in January 1970, yielded the No. 19 hit single "Walkin' In The Rain", first recorded by The Ronettes. It proved to be their final top 40 hit.

Their next singles failed to chart, and the band grew apart, but the demand for appearances remained. From 1970 to 1971 Jay and the Americans' touring band included Walter Becker and Donald Fagen (of later Steely Dan fame) on backup bass guitar and electric organ. Becker and Fagen also contributed string and horn arrangements to the Jay and the Americans albums Sands of Time, Wax Museum, and Capture the Moment (released in 1970). Becker and Fagen were signed with JATA Enterprises as songwriters by Vance, but Vance had difficulty finding labels interested in their songs, so he gave them the touring and arrangement jobs to secure them steady paychecks. Becker and Fagen often mocked Jay Black as being stuck in the 1950s, and though Becker has acknowledged that Black was very tolerant of them, in later interviews Black described Becker and Fagen as extremely talented songwriters but abhorrent human beings.

=== Split ===
The group split in 1973. All of the members moved on to solo musical careers, with the exception of Jay Black, who continued to perform as "Jay and the Americans", using a variety of musicians.

The original version of "Cara Mia" went to No. 1 in the Netherlands when it was re-released in 1980.

In 1991, EMI released songs from their catalog on CD for the first time with the compilation album Come A Little Bit Closer.

In 2001, Jay Black was featured in the PBS special Rock, Rhythm, and Doo Wop as "Jay Black & The Americans".

=== Sale of the band name and reunion (2006-present) ===
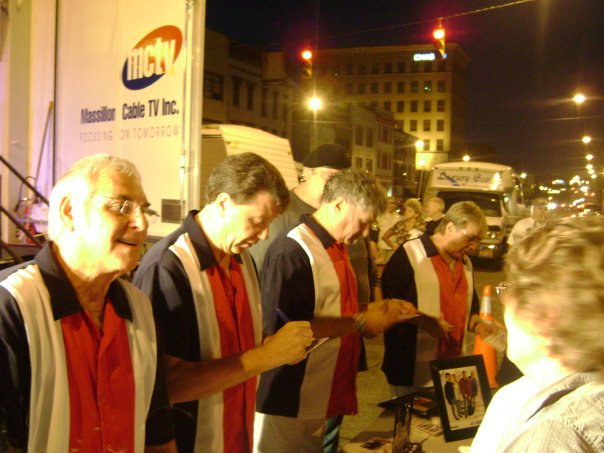
The group backstage at Massillon, Ohio (August 2008) L-R Sandy Deanne, Jay Reincke, Marty Sanders, Howie Kane.

In 2006, Jay Black filed for bankruptcy due to gambling debts, and his ownership of the name "Jay & The Americans" was sold by the bankruptcy trustee to Sandy Deanne for $100,000. With the name purchase, former members Deanne, Howard Kane, and Marty Sanders reunited, and recruited a sound-alike singer from Chicago, coincidentally nicknamed "Jay." Jay Reincke was formerly a carpet company employee who, according to Deanne, had sung in a Jay and the Americans tribute act for 30 years and was another bidder in the auction for the rights to the group's name. Thus, John "Jay" Reincke became the third "Jay" and the band returned to playing both national and international music venues. Since reuniting, the band performs an "average [of] between forty-five and sixty shows per year" in the U.S., Canada, and the Caribbean, according to Rick van Horn, a former contributor to Modern Drummer magazine, who has been the band's touring drummer since 2008 (and who has since become the group's manager and road manager).

In 2009, the reunited group released a new single, the Christmas song "Christmas in America". In 2010, they released two studio albums, 'Til The End of Time and Sweeter Than Wine, their first (studio albums) since 1970. Another studio album, Keepin' the Music Alive, followed in 2011. They released their most recent studio album, titled 45 RPM, in 2015.

Until 2017, David Blatt continued to tour under his stage name, "Jay Black," primarily in the "tri-state area" and Florida. In a 2014 interview, he announced that he had Alzheimer's; he continued to perform until 2017.

Kenny Vance is the lead singer of Kenny Vance and the Planotones, a neo-doo wop band that he formed in the 1970s (who are best known for their song "Looking for an Echo"). Vance did not rejoin the group when they reunited in 2006.

After leaving the group, John Traynor recorded a handful of songs on the Coral label, including "I Rise, I Fall" in 1964. None were hits, but "I Rise, I Fall" became a minor hit for Johnny Tillotson. The label billed Traynor as "JAY formerly of Jay and the Americans." Traynor toured with Jay Siegel's Tokens until shortly before his death on January 2, 2014.

Black died on October 22, 2021, from complications of pneumonia and dementia. In a statement, Jay and the Americans acknowledged that Black and the rest of the group had experienced "both wonderful and very contentious times" but that they respected the success that they achieved with Black as their lead singer.

Howard Kane died in 2023; he was still actively touring with the group at the time of his death.

In 2024, the group added vocalist and guitarist Darren Dowler, formerly of both Paul Revere and the Raiders and the Lettermen, as an official member. Marty Sanders has missed some performances in 2024 and 2025; he is recovering from health concerns and is expected to rejoin the group. Dowler became the group's primary guitarist in Sanders' absence. In 2024 and 2025, in addition to their usual touring schedule, Jay and the Americans also participated in the multi-artist "Happy Together Tour" led by the Turtles. In 2025, the group added vocalist and bassist Lenie Colacino as an official member.

== Awards and recognition ==
The group was inducted into the Vocal Group Hall of Fame in 2002.

== Members ==
=== Current members ===
- Sandy Deanne Yaguda – vocals, occasional cowbell (1960–1973, 2006–present)
- Marty Sanders – vocals, guitar (1962–1973, 2006–present)
- Jay Reincke – lead vocals (2006–present)
- Darren Dowler – vocals, guitar (2024–present)
- Lenie Colacino – vocals, bass (2025–present)

=== Former members ===
- Kenny Vance – vocals (1960–1973)
- Jay Traynor – lead vocals (1960–1962; died 2014)
- Howard Kane – vocals (1960–1973, 2006–2023; his death)
- Jay Black – lead vocals (1962–1973; died 2021)

=== Touring members ===
Current touring musicians

- Rick Van Horn – drums (2008-present)

Former touring musicians

- Brian Cano – drums (1969–1973)
- Walter Becker – bass (early 1970s)
- Donald Fagen – organ (early 1970s)

== Discography ==
Key: Billboard (BB), Cashbox (CB), and RPM charts peak positions

=== Albums ===
==== Studio albums ====
Year	Album	Peak chart positions			Record Label
Year	Album	US 200	US CB	CAN RPM	Record Label
1962	She Cried	—	—	—	United Artists Records
1964	Come a Little Bit Closer	131	88	—	United Artists Records
1965	Blockbusters	113	73	—	United Artists Records
1966	Sunday and Me	141	—	—	United Artists Records
1966	Livin' Above Your Head	—	—	—	United Artists Records
1967	Try Some of This!	—	—	—	United Artists Records
1969	Sands of Time (Note: This album was later reissued with a new cover and the new title of Wax Museum, Vol. 2 to capitalize on the success of their 1970 album Wax Museum.)	51	30	47	United Artists Records
1970	Wax Museum	105	68	71	United Artists Records
1970	Capture the Moment	—	—	—	United Artists Records
2010	'Til The End of Time	—	—	—	Rock-Away Records
2010	Sweeter Than Wine	—	—	—	Rock-Away Records
2011	Keepin' the Music Alive	—	—	—	Rock-Away Records
2015	45 RPM	—	—	—	Rock-Away Records
"—" denotes releases that did not chart or were not released in that territory.

==== Live albums ====
Year	Album	Peak chart positions			Record Label
Year	Album	US 200	US CB	CAN (CHUM)	Record Label
1962	At the Cafe Wha?	—	—	—	United Artists Records
"—" denotes releases that did not chart or were not released in that territory.

==== Compilation albums ====
Year	Album	Peak chart positions		Record Label
Year	Album	US 200	US CB	Record Label
1965	Jay & the Americans Greatest Hits	21	58	United Artists Records
1966	Jay & the Americans Greatest Hits, Volume 2	—	79	United Artists Records
1968	Jay & the Americans!!	—	—	Sunset Records
1969	Early American Hits	—	—	Sunset Records
1991	Come a Little Bit Closer: The Best of Jay and the Americans	—	—	EMI Records
1997	Masterworks 1961-1971 (3-CD set)	—	—	United American Records
2009	The Complete United Artists Singles (3-CD set)	—	—	Capitol Records
"—" denotes releases that did not chart or were not released in that territory.

=== Singles ===
Year	Title	Peak chart positions				B-side From same album as A-side except where indicated	Album
Year	Title	US	US AC	US CB	CAN RPM	B-side From same album as A-side except where indicated	Album
1961	"Tonight"	120	—	—	—	"The Other Girls"	She Cried
1962	"She Cried"	5	—	4	—	"Dawning"	She Cried
1962	"This Is It"	109	—	83	—	"It's My Turn to Cry" (Non-LP track)	Come a Little Bit Closer
1962	"Yes"	—	—	—	—	"Tomorrow" (from Come a Little Bit Closer)	She Cried
1963	"What's the Use"	—	—	—	—	"Strangers Tomorrow"	Come a Little Bit Closer
1963	"Only in America"	25	—	28	—	"My Clair de Lune" (from She Cried)	Come a Little Bit Closer
1963	"Come Dance with Me"	76	—	82	—	"Look in My Eyes Maria"	Come a Little Bit Closer
1964	"To Wait for Love"	—	—	—	—	"Friday"	Come a Little Bit Closer
1964	"Come a Little Bit Closer"	3	—	4	1	"Goodbye Boys, Goodbye"	Come a Little Bit Closer
1964	"Let's Lock the Door (And Throw Away the Key)"	11	—	10	9	"I'll Remember You" (from Livin' Above Your Head)	Blockbusters
1965	"Think of the Good Times"	57	—	54	31	"If You Were Mine, Girl"	Blockbusters
1965	"Cara Mia"	4	—	4	1	"When It's All Over" (Billboard No. 129)	Blockbusters
1965	"Some Enchanted Evening"	13	—	15	5	"Girl"	Jay & the Americans Greatest Hits!
1965	"Sunday and Me"	18	—	20	6	"Through This Doorway" (from Jay & the Americans Greatest Hits!)	Sunday and Me
1966	"Why Can't You Bring Me Home"	63	—	55	16	"Baby Stop Your Cryin'"	Sunday and Me
1966	"Crying"	25	—	32	33	"I Don't Need a Friend"	Sunday and Me
1966	"Livin' Above Your Head"	76	—	78	38	"Look at Me, What Do You See"	Livin' Above Your Head
1966	"(He's) Raining in My Sunshine"	90	—	62	60	"The Reason for Living (For You My Darling)" (from Livin' Above Your Head)	Try Some of This!
1967	"You Ain't as Hip as All That Baby"	—	—	—	—	"Nature Boy"	Try Some of This!
1967	"(We'll Meet in The) Yellow Forest"	131	—	93	75	"Got Hung Up Along the Way"	Non-LP tracks
1967	"French Provincial"	—	—	—	—	"Shanghai Noodle Factory"	Non-LP tracks
1968	"No Other Love"	114	—	119	—	"No, I Don't Know Her" (from Capture the Moment)	Non-LP tracks
1968	"You Ain't Gonna Wake Up Cryin'"	—	—	—	—	"Gemini (Don't You Ever Wonder Why)"	Non-LP tracks
1968	"This Magic Moment"	6	11	5	1	"Since I Don't Have You"	Sands of Time
1969	"When You Dance"	70	—	41	40	"No, I Don't Know Her" (from Capture The Moment)	Sands of Time
1969	"Hushabye"	62	31	45	42	"Gypsy Woman"	Sands of Time
1969	"(I'd Kill) For the Love of a Lady"	—	—	113	—	"Learnin' How to Fly"	Capture the Moment
1969	"Walkin' in the Rain"	19	8	14	17	"For the Love of a Lady" (from Capture the Moment)	Wax Museum, Vol. 1
1970	"Capture the Moment"	57	32	45	41	"Do You Ever Think of Me" (Non-LP track)	Capture the Moment
1970	"Do I Love You?"	—	—	123	—	"Tricia (Tell Your Daddy)" (from Capture the Moment)	Wax Museum, Vol. 1
1971	"There Goes My Baby"	90	—	—	—	"Solitary Man"	Non-album singles
2009	"Christmas in America"	—	—	—	—	N/A	Non-album singles
"—" denotes releases that did not chart or were not released in that territory.
