= She Cried =

Single by Jay and the Americans

from the album She Cried
- A-side: "Dawning"
- Released: 1962
- Genre: Traditional pop; doo-wop
- Length: 2:36
- Label: United Artists
- Songwriters: Ted Daryll, Greg Richards

Jay and the Americans singles chronology
| "Tonight" (1961) | "She Cried" (1962) | "Only in America" (1963) |

"She Cried" is a song written by Ted Daryll and Greg Richards. It was initially recorded by Daryll in July 1961 but became a big hit when covered by Jay and the Americans for the B-side of their second single, "Dawning". The single initially flopped, but six months after its release a disc jockey on the West Coast played the B-side for six hours straight, and listeners responded. In 1962, "She Cried" reached number five on the Billboard Hot 100 and was Jay and the Americans' first major hit. Both sides of the single were subsequently included on their first album, She Cried, which was named in recognition of the song's popularity.

The Lettermen recorded the song in 1964, on an album of the same name, that reached number six on the Billboard Easy Listening chart in 1970. It peaked at number 73 on the Billboard Hot 100 the same year.

The Shangri-Las, ("He Cried"), took their rendition to number 65 on the Billboard Hot 100 in May 1966.

A French version, J'y Crois, was recorded by Canadian artist Junior on Disques AZ in 1968

== Other cover versions ==
- Dave Berry
- Billy Fury on 1963 album, Billy
- The Gestures
- Rowland S. Howard
- David Hasselhoff, on his album, Night Rocker (1985)
- Lords of Altamont on their 2006 album, Lords Have Mercy
- P.J. Proby
- Del Shannon on his 1965 album, One Thousand Six-Hundred Sixty-One Seconds of Del Shannon
- The Outsiders on their 1966 debut album, Time Won’t Let Me
- Dodie Stevens ("I Cried")
- The Mojo Men
- The Lettermen
- Johnny Thunders and Patti Palladin (as "He Cried") on their 1988 album, Copy Cats
