= Mike Esposito (baseball) =

American baseball player (born 1981)

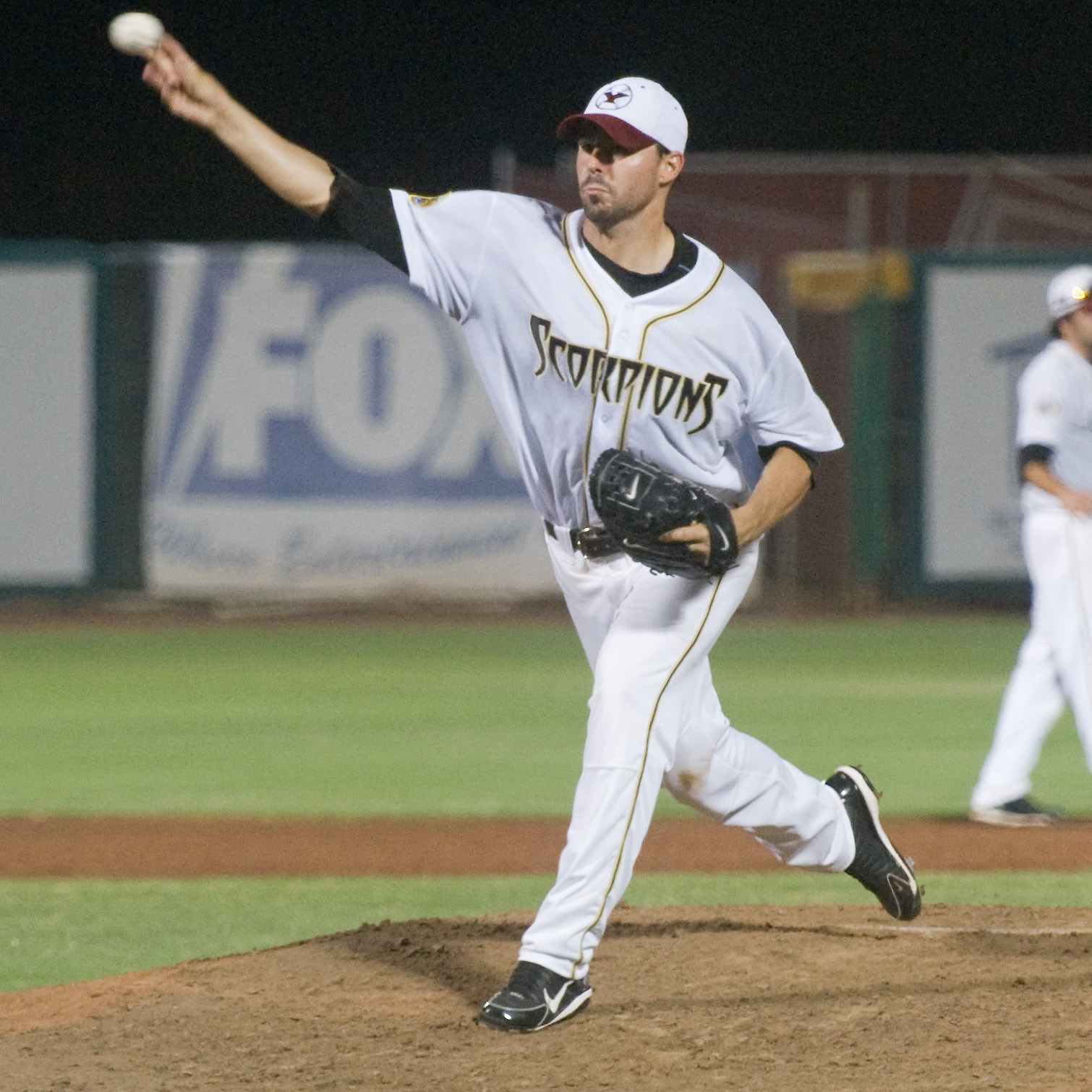
- Esposito with the Yuma Scorpions in 2008
- Pitcher
- Born: September 27, 1981 (age 45); Los Angeles, California, U.S.
- Batted: Right Threw: Right

MLB debut
- September 21, 2005, for the Colorado Rockies

Last MLB appearance
- October 1, 2005, for the Colorado Rockies

MLB statistics
- Win–loss record: 0–2
- Earned run average: 6.75
- Strikeouts: 5
- Stats at Baseball Reference

Teams
- Colorado Rockies (2005)

Michael Anthony Esposito (born September 27, 1981) is a former Major League Baseball starting pitcher who played for the Colorado Rockies. He throws right and bats right. He graduated from Cimarron-Memorial High School in Las Vegas, Nevada before playing baseball at Arizona State University.

== Career ==
Esposito's only Major League experience came during the 2005 season, when he served as a starting pitcher for three games as a late-season call-up when rosters expanded.

== Personal life ==
Esposito is the son of Joe "Bean" Esposito, lead singer for the group Brooklyn Dreams and known for singing "You're the Best" and his duet "Heaven Knows" with Donna Summer. The latter song reached no. 4 on the Billboard Hot 100 chart in 1978.
