= Live and More =

Live album by Donna Summer
- Released: August 31, 1978
- Recorded: June 17, 1978
- Venues: Universal Amphitheater (Los Angeles, California)
- Genres: Disco; soul; adult contemporary
- Length: 77:35
- Label: Casablanca
- Producers: Giorgio Moroder, Pete Bellotte

Donna Summer chronology
Once Upon a Time (1977)	Live and More (1978)	Bad Girls (1979)

Singles from Live and More
- 1. "MacArthur Park" Released: September 24, 1978; 2. "Heaven Knows (with Brooklyn Dreams)" Released: December 9, 1978

Live and More is the first live album recorded by American singer-songwriter Donna Summer, and it was her second double album, released on August 28, 1978, by Casablanca Records.

The live concert featured on the first three sides of this double album was recorded in the Universal Amphitheatre, Los Angeles, California in 1978.

== Background and release ==
During the concert performed at the Universal Amphitheatre in Los Angeles on June 17, 1978, Donna Summer performed a large number of her disco songs - both her hit singles, and a selection of songs from her previous 1977 album, Once Upon a Time. However, in this album, Summer also experiments with other musical styles such as jazz, in a medley she named the "My Man Medley". It consists of the George Gershwin song, "The Man I Love", together with "I Got It Bad (and That Ain't Good)" and the standard "Some of These Days", neither of which she had recorded previously.

Summer also performed a version of the ballad "The Way We Were", originally recorded by Barbra Streisand for the 1973 film of the same name, again, not previously recorded by Summer, but a big live favorite of hers. This was followed by a self-written ballad called "Mimi's Song", dedicated to her young daughter, Mimi Sommer. Sommer was present at this concert for Summer to sing the song to, and she is heard on the recording saying goodnight to the audience.

The concert ends with one of Summer's best-known songs in the United States - "Last Dance". This hit song is included on the soundtrack of the film Thank God It's Friday, in which Summer had also acted. The composer, Paul Jabara, won an Academy Award for Best Original Song at the 51st Academy Awards, and Summer herself won a Grammy Award for Best Female R&B Vocal Performance (her first) with this song at the 21st Annual Grammy Awards. Some versions of "Last Dance" have the slow tempo section removed from the middle but kept at the beginning. The full version, however, was sung at this concert.

The fourth and final side of this double LP album contains a new studio recording entitled "MacArthur Park Suite", which is a medley of three songs including the main song "MacArthur Park", originally recorded as a ballad by the Irish actor Richard Harris. Summer's disco version was edited and issued as a single, and it became one of her biggest hits - her first number one song on the American Billboard Hot 100 singles chart, and a Top five song on the UK Singles Chart. This song also earned Summer a Grammy Award nomination for Best Female Pop Vocal Performance. Another song in the medley, "Heaven Knows" was an American Top five hit, and it featured vocals by Joe Esposito of the Brooklyn Dreams musical group. That group included the musician Bruce Sudano, whom Summer would later marry.

== Critical and commercial reception ==
Professional ratings
Review scores
Source	Rating
AllMusic	3/5 stars
Christgau's Record Guide	C

The album received generally favorable reviews from music critics.

Stephen Cook from AllMusic wrote that none of the album's songs "eclipse the original versions" but concluded that it is a "very enjoyable concert recording".

Robert Christgau gave the album a "C" and criticized the arrangements and the song "Mac Arthur Park Suite," to which he preferred Andy Kaufman's interpretation.

Tom Carson from Rolling Stone gave the album a favorable review and wrote that even though "the hits are exiled to side three, they come across fairly well".

Live and More would become Summer's first number one double album in the United States, and achieved double platinum status in the U.S. from the RIAA.

== Track listing ==
All tracks written by Donna Summer, Giorgio Moroder and Pete Bellotte except where noted; all tracks produced by Moroder and Bellotte.

Side one
No.	Title	Length
1.	"Once Upon a Time"	3:04
2.	"Fairy Tale High"	2:20
3.	"Faster and Faster to Nowhere"	2:09
4.	"Spring Affair"	2:34
5.	"Rumour Has It"	2:34
6.	"I Love You"	3:38
Total length:		16:18

Side two
No.	Title	Writer(s)	Length
1.	"Only One Man"	Bob Conti; Virgil Weber; Summer	2:06
2.	"I Remember Yesterday"		3:52
3.	"Love's Unkind"		2:37
4.	"The Man I Love"/"I Got It Bad (And That Ain't Good)"/"Some of These Days" ("My Man Medley")	George Gershwin; Ira Gershwin / Duke Ellington; Paul Francis Webster / Shelton Brooks	6:25
5.	"The Way We Were"	Alan and Marilyn Bergman; Marvin Hamlisch	3:23
6.	"Mimi's Song"	Weber; Summer	4:28
Total length:			22:51

Side three
No.	Title	Writer(s)	Length
1.	"Try Me, I Know We Can Make It"		4:14
2.	"Love to Love You Baby"		3:34
3.	"I Feel Love"		6:56
4.	"Last Dance"	Paul Jabara	5:32
Total length:			20:16

Side four
No.	Title	Writer(s)	Length
1.	"MacArthur Park"/"One of a Kind"/"Heaven Knows"/"MacArthur Park (Reprise)" ("MacArthur Park Suite")	Jimmy Webb ("MacArthur Park")	17:47
Total length:			17:47

Notes

- When Live and More was released on compact disc (CD), the disk-format of that time could only hold a maximum of 74 minutes. Rather than release the album as a two-disc set, it was released as a single CD, and "MacArthur Park Suite" was replaced with an extended version of the song "Down Deep Inside", which Summer had recorded for the film soundtrack for The Deep during the previous year. The "MacArthur Park Suite", as featured on the various artists compilation, The Casablanca Records Story, and the deluxe edition of her 1979 album Bad Girls, is the 12-inch single version, not the original album version. The album version can only be found on The Dance Collection: A Compilation of Twelve Inch Singles CD (1987), the original Live and More vinyl LP album itself, and the Japanese CD issue of Live and More (Mercury PHCR 1032). The 12-inch version replaces the original album version of "Heaven Knows" with the 7-inch version; "One of a Kind" was trimmed of some of its percussion breaks.
- The 7-inch version of "Heaven Knows" was created by combining the vocals from Summer's Live and More album with the instrumental tracks from Brooklyn Dreams' Sleepless Nights album (on that album Joe Esposito sings the lead vocal and Brooklyn Dreams sing the chorus) - a rare instance of a Summer 7-inch single which is actually longer than the album version. Bob Esty produced and arranged the Sleepless Nights album and should be given co-producer and arranger credit for the 7" version of "Heaven Knows" but the liner notes in every Summer compilation released to date only list Giorgio Moroder and Pete Bellotte as producers and mistakenly credit Greg Mathieson as the arranger.
- Universal Music Japan released a mini LP SHM-CD version of Live and More on August 8, 2012 in Japan (together with seven other Donna Summer albums) which restored the original cover art and included "MacArthur Park Suite".

== Personnel ==
- Donna Summer – vocals
- Keith Forsey – drums
- Richard Adelman – drums
- Sal Guglielmi – bass
- Ken Park – percussion
- Bob Conti – percussion
- Peter Woodford – rhythm guitar
- Mike Warren – lead guitar
- Doug Livingston – keyboards
- Virgil Weber – synthesizer
- Greg Mathieson – Moog synthesizer, clavinet
- Bobby Shew – trumpet
- Rich Cooper – trumpet
- Dalton Smith – trumpet
- Bruce Paulson – trombone
- Bob Payne – trombone
- Dick "Slide" Hyde – bass trombone
- Dick Spencer – alto saxophone
- Don Menza – tenor saxophone
- Joe Romano – baritone saxophone
- John Santulis – concertmaster, violins
- Pauel Farkas – violins
- Mari Tsumura – violins
- Teri Schoebrua – violins
- Jay Rosen – violins
- Lya Stern – violins
- Leonard Selic – viola
- Alfred Barr – viola
- Victor Sazer – cello
- Robert Adcock – cello
- John Fresco – contractor
- Sheri Wish – production manager
- Keith Robertson – stage manager
- Bryan Rooney – assistant stage manager
- Sunshine (Carlena Williams, Dara Bernard, Pamela Quinlan, Mary Ellen Bernard) - backing vocals
- Mike North – equipment
- Marc Figueroa – equipment
- Stanal Sound (Bob Ludwig, Jim Fox, John Taylor) – sound
- Lighting designed by Patrick Woodroffe for TFA Electrosound
- Graphics: Stephen Lumel, Henry Vizcarra
- Photographs by Francesco Scavullo
- Photography assistant: Sean Byrnes
- Donna Summer logotype: Tom Nikosey
- Costumes: David Picon

Production

- Produced by Giorgio Moroder and Pete Bellotte
- Recorded live at the Universal Amphitheatre, Los Angeles, CA. except "MacArthur Park Suite", a studio recording
- Engineered by: Juergen Koppers, Gary Ladinsky, Steve Smith
- Mixdown engineer: Juergen Koppers
- Mixed at Westlake Studios and Rust Studios
- Conducted by: Michael Warren

== Charts and certifications ==
=== Weekly charts ===
Weekly chart performance for Live and More
Chart (1978)	Peak position
Australian Albums (Kent Music Report)	27
Canada Top Albums/CDs (RPM)	2
Canada Top Dance/Urban (RPM)	1
Dutch Albums (Album Top 100)	25
Finnish Albums (Suomen virallinen lista)	18
French Albums (SNEP)	17
Italian Albums (Musica e dischi)	8
Japanese Albums (Oricon)	52
New Zealand Albums (RMNZ)	4
Spanish Albums (AFYVE)	15
UK Albums (Official Charts)	16
US Billboard 200	1
US Top R&B/Hip-Hop Albums (Billboard)	4

=== Year-end charts ===
Year-end chart performance for Live and More
Chart (1979)	Peak position
US Billboard 200	6
US Top R&B/Hip-Hop Albums (Billboard)	11

== Certifications and sales ==
Region	Certification	Certified units/sales
Canada (Music Canada)	2× Platinum	200,000^{^}
United Kingdom (BPI)	Gold	100,000^{^}
United States (RIAA)	Platinum	1,000,000^{^}
^{^} Shipments figures based on certification alone.
