= Sudano =

Sudano is a surname of Sicilian origin. Notable people with the surname include:

- Amanda Sudano (born 1982), American singer-songwriter
- Brooklyn Sudano (born 1981), American actress
- Bruce Sudano (born 1948), American singer-songwriter
