= Kenny Vance and the Planotones =

American rock band

- Origin: Brooklyn, New York, United States
- Genres: Rock
- Years active: 1990–present
- Label: United Artists
- Members: Kenny Vance; Johnny Gale; Kurt "Frenchy" Yahjian; Jimmy Bense; Chip Degaard; Tony Gallino
- Past members: Godfrey Townsend
- Website: planotones.com/

Kenny Vance and the Planotones is an American musical group led by Kenny Vance, formerly of Jay and the Americans.

== Original group ==
Kenny Vance and the Planotones first came to be as a fictional band appearing in the 1978 film American Hot Wax. The band consisted of Kenny Vance and the members of the existing disco trio Brooklyn Dreams (Bruce Sudano, Joe Esposito and Ed Hokenson).

In the film they were portrayed as a very popular group with many hits and sang songs that were actually by artists like Danny & the Juniors and The Del-Vikings.

== The Planotones ==
After leaving Jay and the Americans, Vance formed Kenny Vance and the Planotones in 1992. The band currently includes Johnny Gale, Kurt "Frenchy" Yahjian, Jimmy Bense, Chip Degaard and Tony Gallino as his band and they began touring. Kenny's son Ladd also performs with the Planotones. The group plays doo wop songs of the 1950s and 1960s and their original material is strongly influenced by it. They have released four albums to date which include both original material and covers. In 1996 they had some success with the song "Looking For An Echo."
