= Vitucci =

Vitucci is a surname of Italian origin. Notable people with this surname include:

- Francesco Vitucci (born 1963), Italian basketball head coach
- Giuseppe Vitucci (born 1950), Italian wrestler
- Louis Vitucci (born 1940), American sports diver
- Nick Vitucci (born 1967), a former professional ice hockey goaltender

== See also ==
- Viti (disambiguation)
