= Bob Conti =

American percussionist (born 1947)

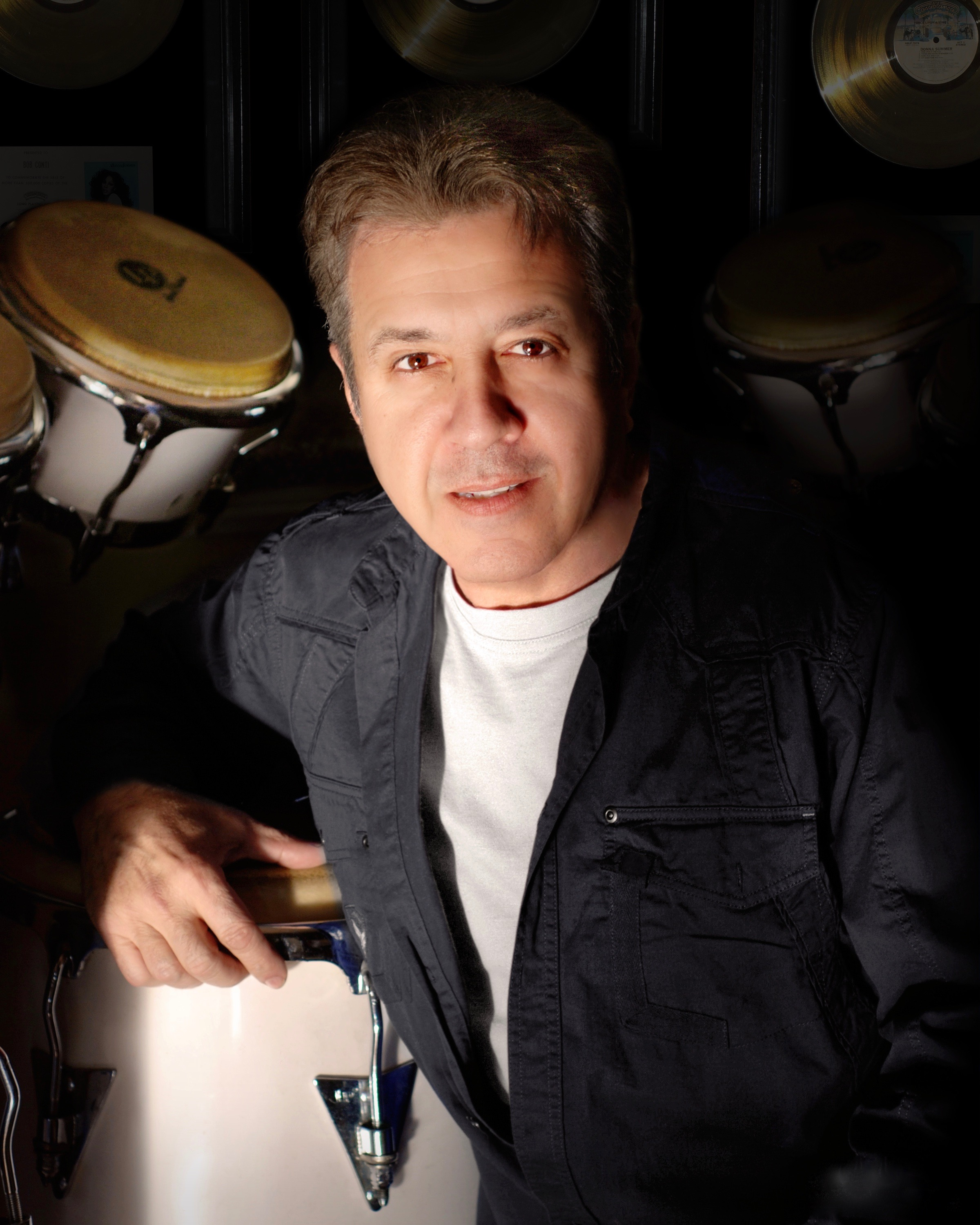

Background information
- Born: Robert James Conti; December 27, 1947 (age 77); Brooklyn, New York, U.S.
- Genres: Jazz, pop, R&B, New Age
- Instrument: Percussion
- Years active: 1967–present
- Website: www.bobconti.com: Bob Conti Burning It Up! on YouTube*

Bob Conti (born December 27, 1947) is an American percussionist known for his work with Donna Summer, Diana Ross, and his long-term collaboration with Jose Feliciano.

He composed and played percussion for Bad Girls, an album that went double platinum. He also produced The Genius of Jose Feliciano Vol 1 & Vol 2 on his own record label, Joyfull Productions.

== Early life ==
Conti was born in Brooklyn and joined the American Legion's Drum and Bugle Corp at 12. He later moved to Los Angeles and attended Venice High School, where he played Baritone Sax in the high school dance band, "The Crescendos," and had his own band, "The Circle of One." After high school, Conti's music career took precedence over his college education at Santa Monica College.

== Career ==
Conti's career started when he won a radio contest with his band, leading to performances with well-known artists and eventually recording an album with Wilson Pickett. Later, he was signed by Jubilee Records as a songwriter and lead vocalist. Conti then joined The Platters as saxophonist and lead vocalist.

Throughout his career, Conti has performed with various artists in the studio and on tour, working on over 150 albums. He has also been a composer, publisher, musical director, television presenter, and bandleader.

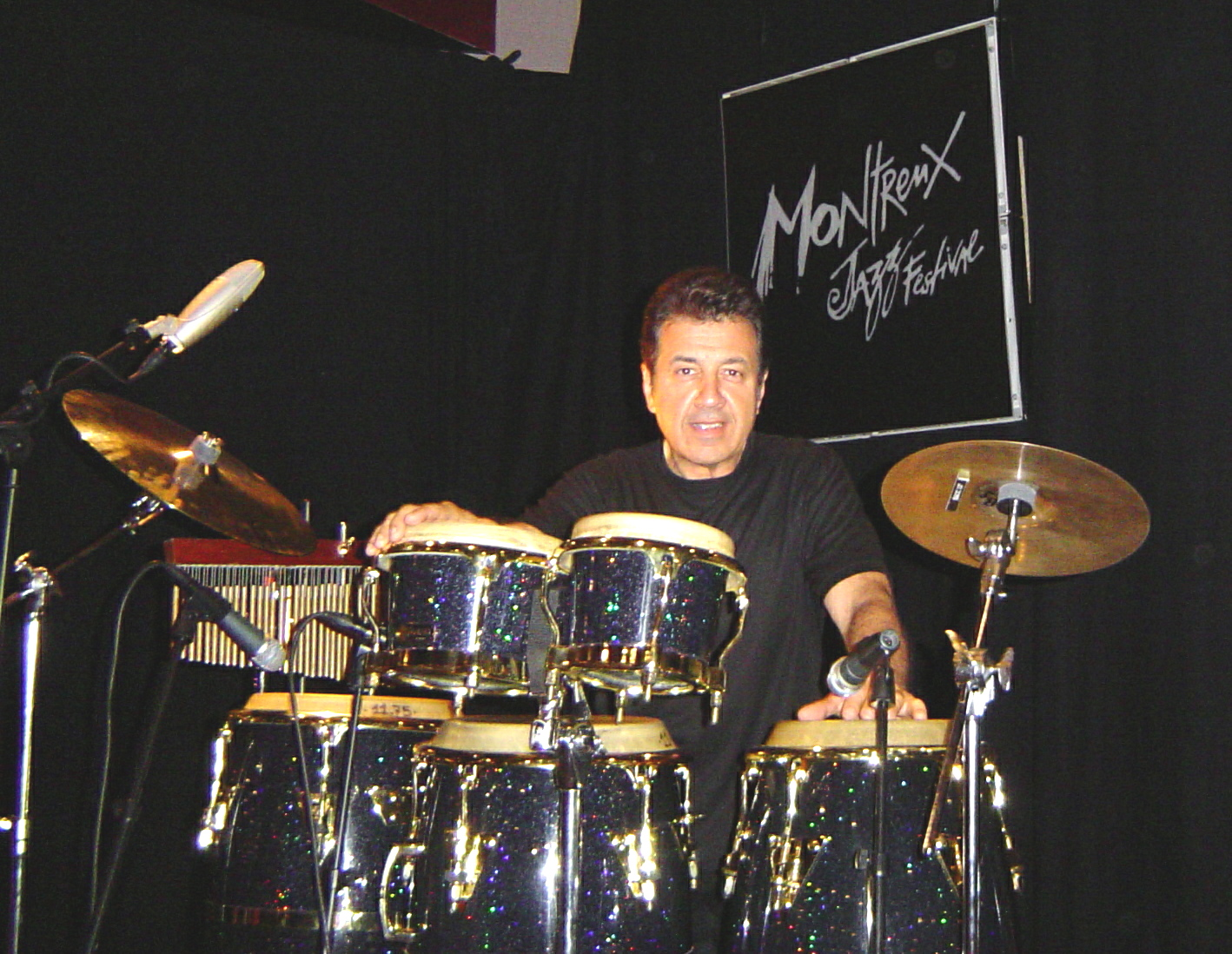
Bob Conti at Montreaux Jazz

== Donna Summer years & Jose Feliciano ==
Conti performed with Donna Summer from 1977 to 2010, contributing to her double platinum Bad Girls album. On that album, he composed "Can't get to sleep at night". He then collaborated with José Feliciano from 1982 to 2016, producing several albums and touring worldwide. In addition to writing songs for him, Bob produced several of his albums, including The Genius of José Feliciano, Volume 1 and Volume 2 and From the Heart.

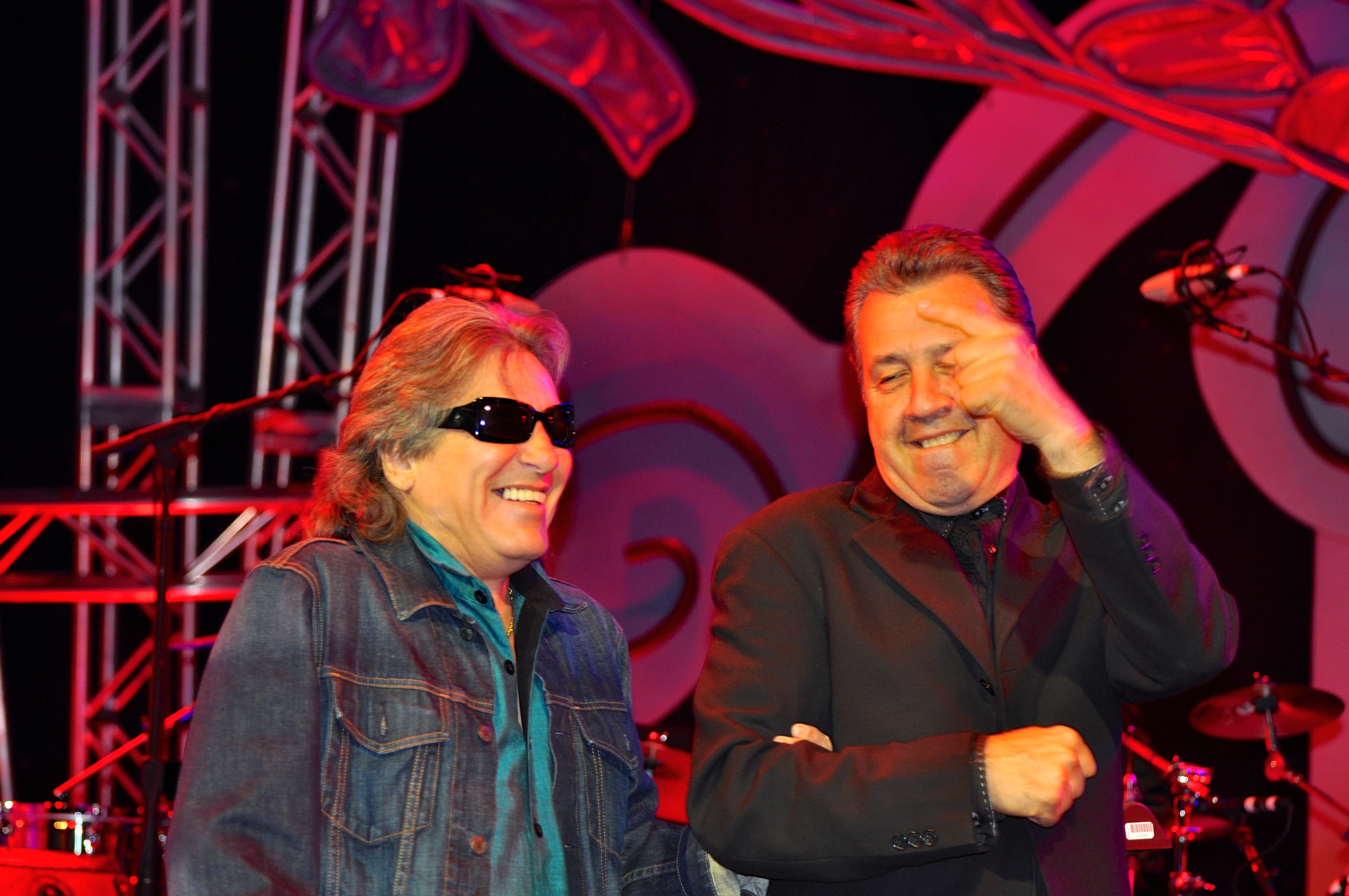
Jose Feliciano & Bob Conti Epcot Center

== Present day ==
Since 2016, Conti has focused on charitable projects and established a non-profit organization called "We Celebrate US." In March 2017, he was appointed by the Mayor of Thousand Oaks, California, to the position of Cultural Arts Commissioner of the Thousand Oaks, California Cultural Affairs Commission/Alliance for the Arts, a term that ended in November 2019. In 2017 Bob was one of the producers of the City of Thousand Oaks' live stage show, the 2017 Excellence In The Arts Awards, and also provided some of his original music for the production.

== Awards ==
Award	Album	Artist	Credits	Year
Gold	The Sound of Vienna	José Feliciano	Percussion	1988
Gold	Escenas de Amor	José Feliciano	Writer, percussion	1982
Double Platinum	Bad Girls	Donna Summer	Composer, percussion	1979
Platinum	Live and More	Donna Summer	Composer, percussion	1978
Platinum	Once Upon a Time	Donna Summer	Percussion	1977

== Discography ==
Album	Artist	Credits	Year
Donna: The CD Collection	Donna Summer	Percussionist	2014
Groovin'	Martini Kings (Tony Marsico)	Bongos, percussionist	2014
Moments Magical	Marty Krystall	Percussionist	2014
Closer	José Feliciano	Writer, composer, percussionist	2011
The Genius of José Feliciano Vol. 1	José Feliciano	Producer, percussionist, background vocalist	2011
The Genius of José Feliciano Vol. 2	José Feliciano	Producer, percussionist, background vocals	2011
From the Heart	José Feliciano	Producer, percussionist, background vocals	2011
Life and the Romantic	Bruce Sudano	Percussionist	2010
New Morning: The Paris Concert	José Feliciano	Percussionist, group member	2009
Resurrection	Swamp Dogg	Main personnel, Congas, bongos, percussionist	2007
The Taste of You (Sabor A Mi)	Wayne Boyer	Congas, bongos, percussionist	2007
A Mellow Jazz Christmas	Bob Conti	Percussionist, primary artist	2006
Bob Conti's Big Band Christmas	Bob Conti	Primary artist, percussionist	2006
Pure Liz Story	Liz Story	Percussionist	2006
Tropical Journeys	Bob Conti	Primary artist, producer, percussionist	2006
Little Drummer Boy	Bob Conti	Primary artist, percussionist	2006
Gold	Donna Summer	Percussionist	2005
Marcia Greatest Hits	Marcia Hines	Percussionist	2004
The Collected Works of the Roches	The Roches	Percussionist	2003
Jazzy Christmas (Vertical Jazz)	Bob Conti	Percussionist, primary artist	2001
Romance & Passion	Benise	Congas, bongos, additional percussion	2001
Revolution	Little Sista	Percussionist	2001
Jazz Relaxante	Bob Conti, Federico Ramos	Primary artist, percussionist	2000
Heart & Soul: Romantic Dedications	Bob Conti, Federico Ramos, Ramón Stagnaro, Adam Del Monte	Producer, percussionist, hand drums, composer	1999
Sounds of Wood and Steel, Vol. 2	Richie Sambora and Various Artists	Congas, djembe	1999
The Art of Storytelling	Slick Rick	Composer	1999
Santa Fe Spice	Bob Conti	Producer, performer, composer, primary artist, percussionist	1998
Visions and Rhythms	Bob Conti	Performer, composer, primary artist, percussionist	1997
Americano	José Feliciano	Castanets	1996
Music, Harmony and Rhythm: The Casablanca Years	Brooklyn Dreams (group)	Percussionist	1996
Behind The Memories	Rita Coolidge	Percussionist	1995
An Evening with Sitting Bull	Bob Conti	Primary artist, producer, percussionist, concept, composer	1995
Disco Mixes	Claudja Barry	Percussionist	1995
The Donna Summer Anthology	Donna Summer	Percussionist	1993
Mistaken Identity (Donna Summer album)	Donna Summer	Percussionist	1991
Steppin' Out	José Feliciano	Shaker, triangle, whistle, percussionist	1990
Joe Bruce & 2nd Avenue	Joe Bruce & 2nd Avenue	Percussion	1987
Unaccountable Effect	Liz Story	Percussion	1985
Como Tú Quieres	José Feliciano	Composer, percussion	1985
Made in America	The Carpenters	Percussion	1981
Nurds	The Roches	Percussion	1980
Won't Let Go	Brooklyn Dreams (group)	Percussion, writer	1980
Won't Let Go	Brooklyn Dreams (group)	Percussion, writer	1980
Jeff Kutash and the Dancin' Machine	Jeff Kutash and the Dancin' Machine	Percussion	1980
Room with a View	Player	Percussionist	1980
Bad Girls (Donna Summer album)	Donna Summer	Composer, percussionist	1979
Night Miracles	Kenny Nolan	Percussion	1979
Feel the Fire	Claudja Barry	Percussion	1979
Joy Ride	Brooklyn Dreams	Percussion	1979
Live and More	Donna Summer	Composer, percussion	1978
Midnight Rhythm	Midnight Rhythm	Percussion	1978
Getting' The Spirit	Roberta Kelly	Percussion	1978
M.A.3	M.A.3	Percussion	1978
Once Upon a Time...	Donna Summer	Percussion	1977
Nature's Secret	Michael Cassidy	Percussion	1977
A Change of Heart	Golden Avatar	Percussion	1976
Direct Disco	Gino Dentie and the Family	Percussion	1976
Join Me and Let's Be Free	Wilson Pickett	Percussion	1975

=== Soundtracks and theme songs ===
Movie/series	Composer	Song	Year
3:15 - The Moment of Truth	Bob Conti, Joe "Bean" Esposito	"Out of Control"	1986
Road Stories	Bob Conti	Theme song	1992

== Endorsements ==
- Roland Electronics/Roland V-Drums
- Toca Percussion
- Latin Percussion Instruments
- Nike Footwear
- Peavey Electronics
- Machudo Cajons
