= MacArthur Park (song) =

Popular song written by Jimmy Webb

- US single picture sleeve (also used for the West German release)

Single by Richard Harris

from the album A Tramp Shining
- B-side: "Didn't We?"
- Released: April 1968
- Recorded: December 21, 1967
- Studio: Sound Recorders, Hollywood
- Genre: Orchestral pop; psychedelia; easy listening; folk rock
- Length: 7:21
- Label: Dunhill
- Songwriter: Jimmy Webb
- Producer: Jimmy Webb

Richard Harris singles chronology
"Here in My Heart (Theme from This Sporting Life)" (1963)	"MacArthur Park" (1968)	"The Yard Went on Forever" (1968)

"MacArthur Park" is a song written by the American singer-songwriter Jimmy Webb, first recorded in 1967 by the Irish actor and singer Richard Harris. Harris's version peaked at number 2 on the US Billboard Hot 100 chart and number 4 on the UK Singles Chart. Webb won the 1969 Grammy Award for Best Arrangement Accompanying Vocalist(s) at the 11th Annual Grammy Awards. "MacArthur Park" was subsequently covered by numerous artists, including a 1970 version by country singer Waylon Jennings and group The Kimberlys that won a Grammy Award for Best Country Performance by a Duo or Group at the 12th Annual Grammy Awards, and a number 1 Billboard Hot 100 disco version by Donna Summer in 1978.

== Composition ==
"MacArthur Park" was written and composed by Jimmy Webb in 1967 as part of a cantata. Webb brought the entire cantata to the Association, but the group rejected it. The inspiration for the song was his relationship and breakup with Susie Horton. MacArthur Park, in Los Angeles, was where the couple would occasionally meet for lunch and spent their most enjoyable times together. At that time (the middle of 1965), Horton worked for Aetna insurance, whose offices were across the street from the park. When asked by interviewer Terry Gross what was going through his mind when he wrote the song's lyrics, Webb replied that it was meant to be symbolic and referred to the end of a love affair. In an interview with Newsday in October 2014, Webb explained:

Everything in the song was visible. There's nothing in it that's fabricated. The old men playing checkers by the trees, the cake that was left out in the rain, all of the things that are talked about in the song are things I actually saw. And so it's a kind of musical collage of this whole love affair that kind of went down in MacArthur Park. ... Back then, I was kind of like an emotional machine, like whatever was going on inside me would bubble out of the piano and onto paper.

Webb and Horton remained friends, even after her marriage to another man. The breakup was also the primary influence for "By the Time I Get to Phoenix", another song written and composed by Webb.

The idea to write and compose a classically structured song with several movements that could be played on the radio came from a challenge by music producer Bones Howe, who produced recordings for the Association.

== Offer to the Association ==
The Sunshine pop band the Association had several hits in the mid-1960s, including "Windy" and "Cherish", which went to number 1. In 1967, the group's producer, Bones Howe, asked Jimmy Webb to create a pop song with different movements and changing time signatures.

Webb delivered "MacArthur Park" to Howe with "everything he wanted", but Howe did not care for the ambitious arrangement and unorthodox lyrics. Ultimately, the song was rejected by the group.

== Richard Harris original version ==
=== Background and release ===
"MacArthur Park" was first recorded by Richard Harris after he met the composer at a fundraiser in East Los Angeles, California, in late 1967. Webb had been invited to provide the musical backdrop at the piano. Out of the blue, Harris, who had just starred in the 1967 film Camelot and had performed several musical numbers in it, suggested to Webb that he wanted to release a record. At first, Webb did not take Harris seriously, but later he received a telegram from Harris requesting that Webb "come to London and make a record". Webb flew to London and played Harris a number of songs for the project, but none seemed to fit Harris for his pop music debut. The last song that Webb played for Harris was "MacArthur Park".

The track was recorded on December 21, 1967, at Armin Steiner's Sound Recorders in Hollywood. String, woodwind, and brass overdubs were recorded during two sessions on December 29 and 30. The musicians in the original studio recording included members of the Wrecking Crew of Los Angeles-based studio musicians who played on many of the hit records of the 1960s and 1970s. Personnel used included Hal Blaine on drums, Larry Knechtel on keyboards, Joe Osborn on bass guitar, and Tommy Tedesco and Mike Deasy on guitars, along with Webb himself on harpsichord.

The song was included on Harris's album A Tramp Shining in 1968 and selected for release as a single, an unusual choice given the song's length and complex structure. It was released in April 1968 and was played by 77 WABC on April 9, 1968. It made its way into the Billboard Hot 100 at number 79 on May 11, 1968, peaking at number 2 on June 22, 1968, behind Herb Alpert's "This Guy's in Love with You". It peaked at number 10 on Billboard's Easy Listening survey and was number 8 on WABC's overall 1968 chart. It topped the music charts in Europe and Australia and also won the 1969 Grammy Award for Best Arrangement Accompanying Vocalist(s) at the 11th Annual Grammy Awards.

=== Charts ===
==== Weekly charts ====
Chart (1968)	Peak position
Australia	1
Canada Top Singles (RPM)	1
Ireland (IRMA)	9
South Africa (Springbok)	5
UK Singles (OCC)	4
US Billboard Hot 100	2
US Easy Listening (Billboard)	10

==== Year-end charts ====
Chart (1968)	Rank
Australia	9
Canada	33
US Billboard Hot 100	51

== Donna Summer version ==
"MacArthur Park"
- Spanish single picture sleeve (also used for the German release with different text)

Single by Donna Summer

from the album Live and More
- B-side: "Once Upon a Time" (Live) (U.S.); "Last Dance" (Live) (France); "MacArthur Park" (Part 2) (Japan); "One of a Kind" (12-inch); "Heaven Knows (12-inch); "MacArthur Park Suite" (12-inch)
- Released: August 28, 1978
- Recorded: 1978
- Genre: Disco
- Length: 8:27 (album version); 3:59 (single version); 17:47 (suite version)
- Label: Casablanca
- Songwriter: Jimmy Webb
- Producers: Giorgio Moroder; Pete Bellotte

Donna Summer singles chronology
"Je t'aime... moi non plus" (1978)	"MacArthur Park" (1978)	"Heaven Knows" (1978)

=== Background and release ===
In August 1978, the American singer Donna Summer released a multi-million selling vinyl single disco version of "MacArthur Park". The song reached number 1 on the US Billboard Hot 100 the week of November 11, 1978, staying there for three weeks, and earning Summer her first nomination for the Grammy Award for Best Female Pop Vocal Performance at the 21st Annual Grammy Awards.

The Italian producer Giorgio Moroder recalled that he and his collaborator Pete Bellotte had been interested in the concept of either remixing a track – as yet undecided – which had been a hit in the 1960s or else remaking a 1960s hit as a dance track: Moroder – "I remember that I was driving in ... on the Hollywood Freeway, and I heard the original song [by Richard Harris] on the radio. I thought: 'That's it – that's the song we've been looking for for almost a year.'" Moroder asked Neil Bogart, president of Casablanca Records, to provide him with a copy of the Richard Harris version of "MacArthur Park" to serve as the basis for Moroder's envisioned discofied reinvention: Bogart obliged with an 8-track tape containing Harris's version, prompting Moroder to buy an 8-track player in order to hear it.

Moroder said that he readily identified "MacArthur Park" as "a great song for Donna – with all those high notes, it was perfect [for her] .... First, I [located] a key that she could sing really high, but still with a big voice – that took an hour or two. I played a little piano and she sang it with my accompaniment. We found a key and we had Greg Mathieson do the arrangement – and then I did something very special" – that "something very special" being Moroder's recording of his own voice to form a choir heard behind Summer on the song's chorus: "I recorded about 20 seconds of all the notes, which I was able to sing on a 24-track. I made a loop of those notes, and put that loop in the [Solid State Logic] desk. I could form eight chords by having C–E–G right on the group. I played the chords by moving the track according to the chord that I needed." Moroder recalled: "To be honest, it was a very difficult song to [arrange], especially the brass, but we had the best musicians in town."

Summer's recording of "MacArthur Park", included as part of the "MacArthur Park Suite" on her double album Live and More, was eight minutes and forty seconds long. The shorter seven-inch vinyl single version – which omits the song's balladic second movement – gave Summer, after a string of several successful chart hits, her first number 1 hit on the Billboard Hot 100, also becoming the last of seven hit versions of compositions by Jimmy Webb to reach the Top Ten on the Hot 100, with "MacArthur Park" by Summer being the only recording of a Webb composition to top the Hot 100.

Record World reported that this version produces a "dazzling" effect and that "the syn-drums and inspired production techniques are occasional and dramatic."

The nearly 18-minute musical medley "MacArthur Park Suite" incorporated the original songs "One of a Kind" and "Heaven Knows" featuring Brooklyn Dreams, the latter being issued as the second single off Live and More. This medley was also sold as a 12-inch (30 cm) vinyl recording, and it stayed at number 1 on Billboard's Hot Dance Club Songs chart for five weeks in 1978.

The versions of this medley in Live and More and in the 12-inch recording are notably different in the presentation of the two original songs. In the 12-inch version, "Heaven Knows" was extended to incorporate the instrumental string introduction and the bridge horn solo of the single version for radio stations, but left out the second verse, and "One of a Kind" was trimmed of a large part of the instrumental break but included the second verse. Lyrically, Summer's rendition is also curious, in that it adds the word "Chinese" to clarify what type of checkers was being played.

"MacArthur Park Suite" was not included on the compact disc version of Live and More because of early CD limitations; however, the album version is available on 1987's The Dance Collection: A Compilation of Twelve Inch Singles. The 12-inch special one-sided disco DJ single has been digitally remastered and included on the Bad Girls digipak double CD release. In 2012, "Live and More" was remastered in Japan and included the original LP version of the "MacArthur Park Suite".

In 2013, the song was remixed by Laidback Luke for the Donna Summer remix album Love To Love You Donna (it was also remixed by Ralphi Rosario and Frank Lamboy), which was released to dance clubs all over America, having a successful peaking at number 1, giving Summer her first posthumous number 1 and her twentieth number 1 overall.

MacArthur Park Suite
No.	Title	Writer(s)	Length
1.	"MacArthur Park Suite"; I. "MacArthur Park" (8:27); II. "One of a Kind" (5:00); III. "Heaven Knows" (2:37); IV. "MacArthur Park (Reprise)" (1:43)	Jimmy L. Webb; Donna Summer; Giorgio Moroder; Pete Bellotte	17:47
Total length:			17:47

MacArthur Park / Once Upon a Time
No.	Title	Writer(s)	Length
1.	"MacArthur Park"	Jimmy Webb	3:59
2.	"Once Upon a Time"	Donna Summer; Giorgio Moroder; Pete Bellotte	2:55
Total length:			6:54

=== Legacy ===
The British electronic duo Pet Shop Boys used a sample of Summer's version in their 1999 song "New York City Boy" on their album Nightlife. In October 2000, VH1 ranked "MacArthur Park" number 89 in their list of "100 Greatest Dance Songs". In June 2020, Slant Magazine ranked it number 28 in their "The 100 Best Dance Songs of All Time" list. In March 2025, Billboard ranked the song number 73 in their "The 100 Best Dance Songs of All Time" list.

At the 2026 Winter Olympics in Milan Cortina, figure skater Alysa Liu skated to an edited version of Summer's "MacArthur Park Suite" during the free skate and won the USA's first gold medal in the event since 2002, causing streams on Spotify to increase by over 1000% and streams of the Donna Summer's single version to increase by over 800%.

=== Charts ===
==== Weekly charts ====
Chart (1978–1979)	Peak position
Canada Top Singles (RPM)	1
Canada Adult Contemporary (RPM)	1
Canada Dance/Urban (RPM)	1
Finland (Suomen virallinen lista)	6
Ireland (IRMA)	7
Italy (Musica e dischi)	19
Netherlands (Single Top 100)	8
Netherlands (Dutch Top 40)	9
Spain Singles (Promusicae)	13
Spain Radio (Los 40)	6
UK Singles (OCC)	5
US Billboard Hot 100	1
US Adult Contemporary (Billboard)	24
US Hot Disco Singles (Billboard)	1
US Cash Box Top 100	1

Chart (2013)	Peak position
US Dance Club Songs (Billboard)	1
US Hot Dance/Electronic Songs (Billboard)	20

==== Year-end charts ====
Chart (1978)	Rank
Australia (Kent Music Report)	96
Canada (RPM) Top Singles	33
US Cash Box Top 100	27

Chart (1979)	Rank
US Top Pop Singles (Billboard)	12

== Certifications ==
Region	Certification	Certified units/sales
Canada (Music Canada)	Gold	75,000^{^}
United Kingdom (BPI)	Silver	250,000^{^}
United States (RIAA)	Platinum	2,000,000^{^}
^{^} Shipments figures based on certification alone.

== Other versions ==
There are at least 219 versions of the song recorded on the SecondHandSongs database.

A cover version of "MacArthur Park" was recorded by country music singer Waylon Jennings on his 1969 album Country-Folk, which included the family group the Kimberlys. This version charted at number 23 on the US Hot Country Songs chart and number 93 on the Billboard Hot 100, making its chart debut on August 23, 1969. It also won both acts the 1970 Grammy Award for Best Country Performance by a Duo or Group with Vocal at the 12th Annual Grammy Awards. It was revisited in 1976 by Jennings, on his album Are You Ready for the Country.

In late 1969, Tony Bennett's cover from the album Tony Sings the Great Hits of Today! reached No. 39 on the US Easy Listening chart and No. 40 Canadian Adult Contemporary.

The Four Tops version from their album Four Tops Now! reached number 38 on the Billboard Hot 100 chart and number 37 in Canada in 1971. The Andy Williams version from his 1972 album Love Theme from "The Godfather" debuted on the Easy Listening chart in early August and rose to number 26 over the course of five weeks.

In 1970, trumpeter Maynard Ferguson recorded an extended version of "MacArthur Park", arranged by Adrian Drover, and released it on the album M.F. Horn. The arrangement, which was changed and modified several times during Ferguson's performing career, became one of his signature charts and some version of it was included in nearly every live appearance by Ferguson and his big band.

The Scottish progressive rock band Beggars Opera covered it on their 1972 album Pathfinder, featuring harpsichord and Mellotron, with Martin Griffiths on vocals. While their eight-minute version was panned by music critic Paul Stump who said that the band "over-eggs the already indigestible pudding" of the song, Richard Harris himself reportedly praised it, stating: "Beggar's added that intense lustre and vibrancy that was so needed".

Elaine Paige recorded a version of the song on her 1985 album Love Hurts.

In 1993, "Weird Al" Yankovic released a parody of the song, titled "Jurassic Park", as the lead single to his album Alapalooza.

The Negro Problem included a cover of the song on their 1997 album Post Minstrel Syndrome. The lyrics "someone left their cake out in the rain" were changed to "someone left their crack out in the rain".

The progressive rock supergroup The Neal Morse Band included a cover of the song on the bonus disc for their 2015 album The Grand Experiment, rearranged by keyboardist and vocalist Bill Hubauer.

== In popular culture ==
The song has been featured in a variety of films. Both Harris' and Summer's versions of "MacArthur Park" appear in Beetlejuice Beetlejuice (2024); Summer's is heard during the film's opening production logos and closing credits, while, in a similar manner as "Day-O" in the first film, Harris' version is performed during a wedding scene, where it is lip-synched and danced to by the cast.

In the movie Vertical Limit, during a rock climbing scene at the beginning, two of the characters are heard singing the chorus as part of a game of guess the song.

The first half of Kendrick Lamar's "TV Off" samples Monk Higgins' instrumental jazz cover of "MacArthur Park".

Dave Barry's Book of Bad Songs, written after a survey among the readers of Dave Barry, had "MacArthur Park" chosen as the worst song ever.

Manila Luzon performed "MacArthur Park" in the "Lip Sync For Your Life" on season 3 of RuPaul's Drag Race. In 2024, Stephen Daw writing for Billboard credited this performance as one of the most iconic lip syncs on the show.

Figure skater Alysa Liu skated to a shortened version of "MacArthur Park Suite" for her free skate program during the 2024–2025 season. She used the song again in her gold medal–winning performance at the 2026 Winter Olympics.

Indie singer-songwriter Josh Rude references "MacArthur Park" in the title of his 2024 song "Cake in the Rain".

== See also ==
- List of number-one dance singles of 2013 (U.S.)
- Jurassic Park (song)
