= Viti =

Viti or Víti may refer to:

== Places ==
- Viti, Estonia, a village in Estonia
- Viti, Kosovo, a town and municipality in Kosovo
- Víti (meaning "hell" in Icelandic), the name of several locations in Iceland:
  - Víti (Askja), a warm crater lake near Askja caldera in central Iceland
  - Víti (Krafla), a crater lake in Krafla caldera in northern Iceland
- Viti is the Fijian-language name of Fiji, an island nation in the South Pacific Ocean:

- Bei Kai Viti, a political party in Fiji in the years 1999-2005
- Premier of the Kingdom of Viti, head of the first unified Fijian state 1871-1874
- Tui Viti, a title which denotes Fijian royalty and translates as King of Fiji
- Viti Levu, the largest island in Fiji
- Viti Levu giant pigeon, Natunaornis gigoura, a prehistoric flightless pigeon from Fiji
- Viti Levu Group, a group of islands in Fiji
- Viti Levu rail, Vitirallus watlingi, a prehistoric bird from Fiji
- Viti Levu scrubfowl, Megapodius amissus, a prehistoric bird from Fiji
- Viti Levu snipe, Coenocorypha miratropica, a prehistoric bird from Fiji

== People ==
- Viti (footballer) (born 1997), Spanish footballer
- Dave Viti (1939–2023), American football player
- Fabrizio Viti (born 1967), Italian fashion designer
- Francisco Viti (1933–2023), Angolan prelate
- Serena Viti, astrophysicist
- Timoteo Viti (1469–1523), Italian painter

== Other ==
- Viti language, spoken in Nigeria
- Viti-dandu, another name for gilli-danda, an amateur sport similar to cricket.
- "viti" is a word in Albanian which means "year".
