= American Roulette =

American Roulette may refer to:

- American Roulette (album), a 1977 album by Danny O'Keefe
- "American Roulette" (song), a song by Robbie Robertson on the 1987 album Robbie Robertson
