= Looking for an Echo =

- Directed by: Martin Davidson
- Written by: Jeffrey Goldenberg; Robert Held; Martin Davidson
- Produced by: Paul Kurta; Martin Davidson
- Starring: Armand Assante; Diane Venora; Joe Grifasi; Tom Mason; Tony Denison; Johnny Williams; Edoardo Ballerini
- Cinematography: Charles Minsky
- Edited by: Jerrold L. Ludwig
- Music by: Phillip Namanworth; Kenny Vance
- Distributed by: Regent Releasing; Arthur Kananack & Associates; Regent Entertainment; Screen Media Films
- Release date: 2000
- Running time: 97 minutes
- Country: United States
- Language: English

Looking for an Echo is 2000 independent drama film.

== Plot ==
The lead singer of an oldies group reminisces about the good ol' days and a potential comeback.

== Cast ==
- Armand Assante as Vinnie Pirelli
  - Rick Faugno as Young Vinnie Pirelli
- Diane Venora as Joanne Delgado
- Tom Mason as Augustus "Augie" MacAnnally III
  - Tommy J. Michaels as Young Augustus "Augie" MacAnnally III
- Anthony John Denison as Ray "Nappy" Napolitano (as Tony Denison)
  - Eric Meyersfield as Young Ray "Nappy" Napolitano
- Johnny Williams as Phil "Pooch" Puccirelli
  - Danny Gerard as Young Phil "Pooch" Puccirelli
- Joe Grifasi as Vic (uncredited)
  - Johnny Giacalone as Young Vic
- Edoardo Ballerini as Anthony Pirelli
- Christy Carlson Romano as Tina Pirelli
- David Vadim as Tommie Pirelli
- Monica Trombetta as Francine Pirelli
- David Margulies as Dr. Ludwig
- Paz de la Huerta as Nicole Delgado (as Paz De La Huerta)
- Ilana Levine as Sandi (Vic's Date)
- Gena Scriva as Arlene (Blonde at Bar)
- Gayle Scott as Renee (Brunette at Bar)
- Cleveland Still as Singer on Bus
- Peter Jacobson as Marty Pearlstein (Backstage Agent)
- Murray Weinstock as Orchid Blue Lead / Vocals for 'The Dreamers'
- Amanda Homi as Orchid Blue Singer
- Machan Notarile as Orchid Blue Singer (as Machun)
- Michael Cooke Kendrick as Jason (Bar Mitzvah Boy) (as Michael Cooke)
- Kresimir Novakovic as Waiter At Bar
- Uri "Teddy" Dallal as Public Access Drums
- Jorge Pequero as Public Access Bass
- Eva Giangi as Public Access Keyboard
- Lisa France as Night Nurse
- Fanni Green as Day Nurse
- Alesandra Asante as Neighborhood Girl
- Kenny Vance as Vocals for Vince (voice)
- Norbert Leo Butz as Vocals for Anthony (voice) (as Norbert Butz)
- Eddie Hokenson as Vocals for 'The Dreamers' (voice)
- Vinny DeGennaro as Vinny (uncredited)
- Dolores Sirianni as Garyn (uncredited)
