= Love to Love You, Donna Summer =

2023 documentary film by Roger Ross Williams and Brooklyn Sudano

- Official release poster
- Directed by: Roger Ross Williams; Brooklyn Sudano
- Produced by: Julie Goldman; Christopher Clements; Carolyn Hepburn; Roger Ross Williams; David Blackman
- Edited by: Enat Sidi; Jon Stray
- Music by: T. Griffin
- Production companies: HBO Documentary Films; PolyGram Entertainment; Motto Pictures; Federal Films; One Story Up Productions
- Distributed by: HBO
- Release dates: February 17, 2023 (Berlinale); May 20, 2023
- Running time: 105 minutes
- Country: United States
- Language: English

Love to Love You, Donna Summer is a 2023 American documentary film about the life and career of Donna Summer, directed by Roger Ross Williams and Brooklyn Sudano. The film title is taken from Summer's popular 1975 album and its eponymous disco track.

Following its world premiere at the 73rd Berlin International Film Festival on February 17, 2023, the film was released May 20, 2023, on HBO. The project was nominated at the 8th Critics' Choice Documentary Awards for Best Music Documentary.

== Production ==
Brooklyn Sudano wanted to make a documentary revolving around her mother, Donna Summer, after realizing there was more to her than people knew. Roger Ross Williams also wanted to make a documentary revolving around Summer, while discussing a potential project with Julie Goldman, Goldman connected the two. Williams and Sudano did not want the project to be a puff piece, instead exploring difficult aspects of Summer's life and career. Sudano and Williams opted to use Summer speaking in her own words, using audiotapes recorded for her memoir Ordinary Girl.

In December 2021, it was announced Roger Ross Williams and Brooklyn Sudano would direct a documentary film revolving around Donna Summer.

== Release ==
The film had its world premiere at the 73rd Berlin International Film Festival on February 17, 2023. It also screened at South by Southwest on March 11, 2023. It was released on May 20, 2023, by HBO.

== Reception ==
On the review aggregator website Rotten Tomatoes, the film holds an approval rating of 82% based on 28 reviews, with an average rating of 7.3/10. The website's critics consensus reads, "An enigmatic documentary about an equally enigmatic singer, Love to Love You, Donna Summer's got you covered from disco to soul." Metacritic, which uses a weighted average, assigned the film a score of 62 out of 100, based on 6 critics, indicating "generally favorable" reviews.
