= Amanda Sudano =

American singer-songwriter and model (born 1982)

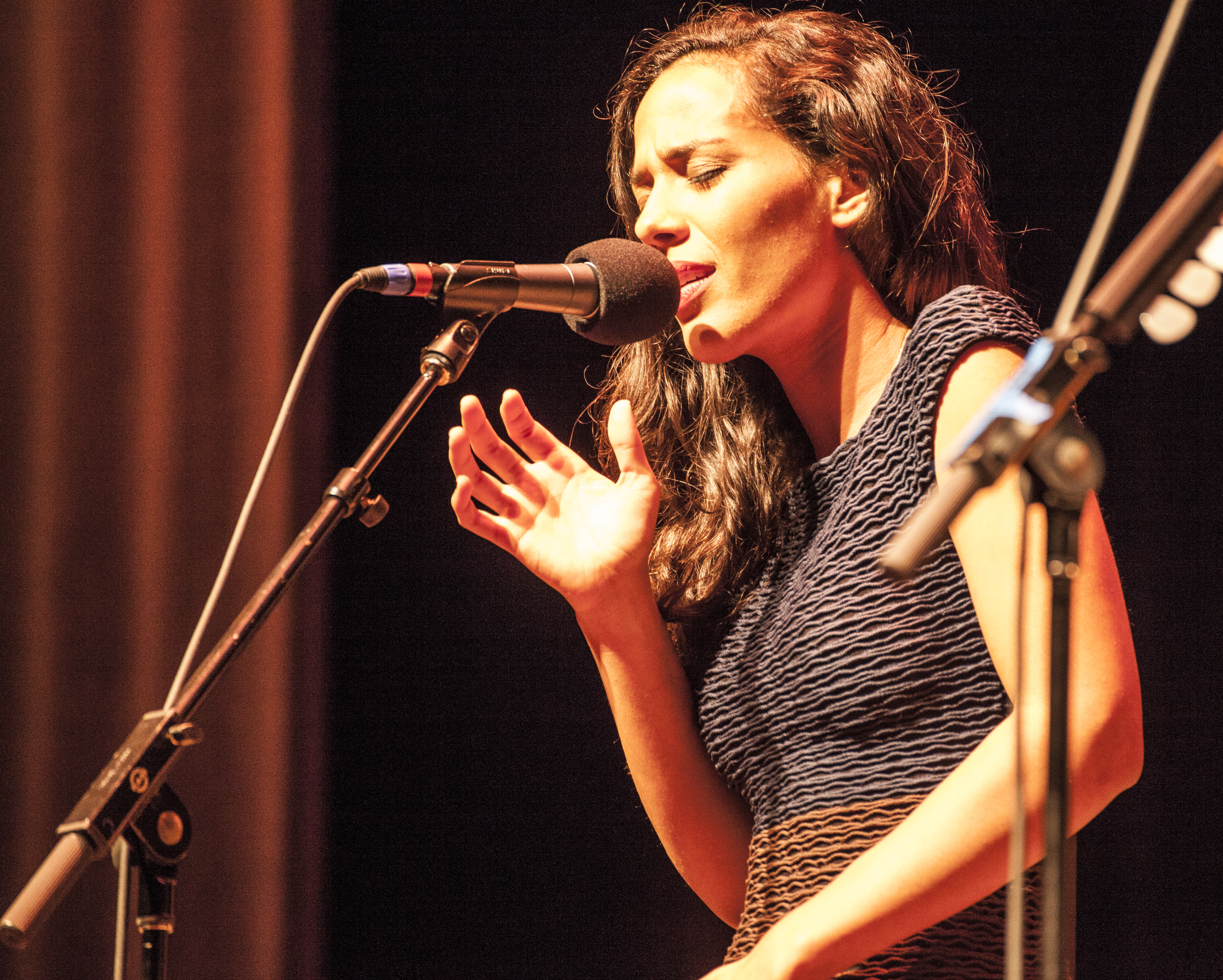
- Sudano performing in 2013
- Born: Amanda Grace Sudano; August 11, 1982 (age 44); Los Angeles, California, U.S.
- Other name: Amanda Sudano Ramirez
- Occupations: Singer-songwriter; model
- Years active: 2005–present
- Spouse: Abner Ramirez (m. 2009)
- Children: 3
- Parent(s): Donna Summer (mother); Bruce Sudano (father)
- Relatives: Brooklyn Sudano (sister)
- Musical career
- Genres: Folk, soul, blues, pop
- Instrument: Vocals

Amanda Grace Sudano Ramirez (born August 11, 1982) is an American singer-songwriter and model. She is a member of the musical duo Johnnyswim.

== Early life ==
Sudano was born in Los Angeles, California, to singer Donna Summer (1948-2012) and songwriter Bruce Sudano (1948). She has two older sisters, Mimi Sommer Dohler, from her mother's first marriage to actor Helmut Sommer, and actress Brooklyn Sudano. Her maternal cousin is the music producer and rapper Omega Red, and her paternal uncle is Fr Glenn Sudano, a Catholic priest and founding member of the Franciscan Friars of the Renewal in New York City.

Sudano spent the early part of her childhood in Thousand Oaks, California. In 1995, when she was 13, her family moved to Nashville, Tennessee, where she attended high school at Christ Presbyterian Academy and college at Vanderbilt University.

== Modeling career ==
Sudano is a model with the Bella Agency in New York.

In 2010, Fabrizio Viti chose Sudano to model for Louis Vuitton's Spring/Summer 2010 shoe campaign. Sudano is the first black model to be featured solely in Louis Vuitton advertisements.

In September 2011, Sudano placed second out of twenty in Vogue's "Special Edition Best Dressed" feature.

== Music career ==
In 2005, Sudano met songwriter, guitarist and vocalist Abner Ramirez in Nashville. They struck up a friendship and formed the band Johnnyswim. The duo have performed covers of eclectic songs like Edith Piaf's "La Vie En Rose" and Britney Spears's "Till The World Ends", as well as originals like "Home", the theme song to the hit HGTV show Fixer Upper. Johnnyswim released their first self-titled EP in 2008. A second EP, 5-8, arrived in 2010. This was followed by the singles Bonsoir and Good News in 2011, a third EP called Home, Vol. 1 in 2012, and four studio albums: Diamonds (2014), Georgica Pond (2016), Moonlight (2019), and Johnnyswim (2022).

== Personal life ==
In 2009, Sudano married her Johnnyswim bandmate Abner Ramirez in Florida. Her father, Bruce Sudano, paid tribute to her in the song "The Amazing Amanda Grace" on his award-winning record Life and the Romantic. Footage from her wedding was featured in the video for another track from the same record, "It's Her Wedding Day", which was actually written about her sister Brooklyn's marriage in 2006.

Sudano lives with her husband in Los Angeles, California, and gave birth to a son, Joaquin, in February 2015. In 2018, she gave birth to a daughter, Luna. In November 2019, the couple announced on social media that she had given birth to a second daughter named Paloma. As of 2021, Sudano and her family are the stars of two Magnolia Network television shows: Home on the Road with Johnnyswim and The Johnnyswim Show.
