= Brooklyn Sudano =

American actress (born 1981)

- Born: January 5, 1981 (age 45); Los Angeles, California, U.S.
- Education: Lee Strasberg Theatre and Film Institute
- Occupations: Actress, Director
- Years active: 2003–present
- Spouse: Mike McGlafin (m. 2006)
- Children: 1
- Parent(s): Donna Summer (mother); Bruce Sudano (father)
- Relatives: Amanda Sudano (sister)

Brooklyn Sudano is an American actress and director. She starred as Vanessa Scott in the ABC comedy series My Wife and Kids and later played the leading role in the 2006 drama film Rain. Sudano has appeared in films such as Alone in the Dark II (2008), Turn the Beat Around (2010) and With This Ring (2015), and starred in the NBC action series, Taken (2017).

Sudano is the daughter of Grammy Award-winning singer Donna Summer and songwriter Bruce Sudano, and the older sister of Amanda Sudano of the music duo Johnnyswim. Sudano directed the documentary film, Love to Love You, Donna Summer, which premiered in 2023.

== Early life ==
Sudano was born in Los Angeles, California, to African American singer Donna Summer and Italian American songwriter Bruce Sudano. She was named after her father's hometown of Brooklyn, New York City. Her younger sister (by 19 months) is singer and songwriter Amanda Sudano of Johnnyswim. She has an older half-sister, Mimi Sommer, from her mother's first marriage to Helmut Sommer. As a baby, she was featured in her mother's song "Brooklyn" on the record I'm a Rainbow.

Sudano spent the early part of her childhood on a 56-acre ranch in Thousand Oaks, California until her family moved to Connecticut when she was 10 years old. When she was 14, her family relocated to Nashville, Tennessee. Here, Sudano gravitated toward the arts. She also sang in the gospel choir at church. Sudano and her sisters spent summers touring and singing backing vocals for their famous mother. In her leisure, she studied dance and wrote songs.

She attended high school at Christ Presbyterian Academy where she appeared in all the theater productions. Sometimes Sudano accompanied her parents while they toured around the world, continuing her studies with tutors. A distinguished student, she was valedictorian at her graduation.

Upon graduation, Sudano chose to attend Vanderbilt University, having also been accepted at Brown, Duke, and Georgetown University. However, she eventually left Vanderbilt early to study at the Lee Strasberg Theatre and Film Institute in New York.

== Career ==
While studying acting in New York, Sudano was spotted by a modelling agent and signed to the Ford Modeling Agency. She appeared in numerous advertising campaigns in print and television, including Clairol, Clean & Clear and K-Mart. In 2003, Sudano replaced Meagan Good as Vanessa Scott on My Wife and Kids. Vanessa is Jr.'s girlfriend and later wife, who first appears in the season 4 premiere episode. Sudano continued as a regular cast member throughout the rest of the series' five-year run.

In 2006, Sudano made her big screen debut with the leading role in the film adaptation of V. C. Andrews' novel Rain. She appeared in the horror films Somebody Help Me (2007) and Alone in the Dark II (2008) and well as the MTV romantic drama film, Turn the Beat Around in 2010. In 2015, she co-starred opposite Regina Hall, Jill Scott and Eve in the romantic comedy-drama, With This Ring. On television, Sudano guest starred on Cuts, CSI: NY, $#*! My Dad Says, Body of Proof and Ballers. In 2016, she played the role of Christy Epping in the Hulu miniseries 11.22.63. In 2017, Sudano starred in the first season of NBC's action series, Taken. In 2021, she began starring as Angela Prescott in the Freeform thriller series, Cruel Summer.

Alongside Roger Ross Williams, Sudano directed the 2023 documentary film, Love to Love You, Donna Summer about her mother, Donna Summer. It had its world premiere at the 73rd Berlin International Film Festival.

== Personal life ==
Sudano married her longtime boyfriend, Mike McGlaflin, on October 8, 2006. The couple's wedding inspired Bruce Sudano's song "It's Her Wedding Day".

Sudano and McGlaflin have a daughter, and reside in the Los Angeles area.

== Filmography ==
=== Film ===
Year	Title	Role	Notes
2006	Rain	Rain Arnold	
2007	Somebody Help Me	Serena	
2008	Alone in the Dark II	Sinclair	
2009	Revolution	Roxanne	Television film
2010	Turn the Beat Around	Malika	
2010	Five Star Day	Yvette Montgomery	
2010	Sinners and Saints	Beth Ganz	
2012	Five Hours South	Julia	
2015	With This Ring	Elise	Television film
2023	Love to Love You, Donna Summer		Director and producer Nominated — Berlin International Film Festival Documentary Award; Nominated — SXSW Film Festival Audience Award
2023	Every Breath She Takes	Dana Marks	Television film

=== Television ===
Year	Title	Role	Notes
2003–2005	My Wife and Kids	Vanessa Scott	Series regular, 28 episodes
2006	Cuts	Felicia	3 episodes
2007	CSI: NY	Colleen Ballard	Episode: "Heart of Glass"
2008	Fear Itself	Arlene	Episode: "Community"
2008	90210	Miss Austin	Episode: "We're Not in Kansas Anymore"
2008	Without a Trace	Jackie Bell	Episode: "22 x 42"
2009	The Unit	Lindsay	Episode: "Whiplash"
2009	Limelight	Jazmine Barkley	TV pilot
2010	$#*! My Dad Says	Zoey	Episode: "Not Without My Jacket"
2011	Friends with Benefits	Kat	Episode: "The Benefit of Being Shallow"
2012	Joey Dakota	Holly	TV pilot
2013	Body of Proof	FBI Analyst	Episode: "Disappearing Act"
2013	Westside	Jess Roman	TV pilot
2015	Reed Between the Lines	Rita Durren	2 episodes
2016	11.22.63	Christy Epping	4 episodes
2016	Ballers	Victoria	2 episodes
2017	Taken	Asha Flynn	Series regular, 10 episodes
2019	All American	Nadja Moon	TV pilot
2021	Cruel Summer	Angela Prescott	Series regular, 5 episodes
2022	Grand Crew	Deena	Episode: "Wine & Therapy"
