= Turn the Beat Around (film) =

- Written by: Jessica Sharzer
- Directed by: Bradley Walsh
- Starring: Romina D'Ugo; David Giuntoli; Brooklyn Sudano; Jacqueline MacInnes Wood
- Theme music composer: Bonspiel
- Country of origin: United States
- Original language: English

Production
- Producers: Andrea Raffaghello; Zack Sherman
- Cinematography: David Greene
- Editor: Chris Van Dyke
- Production companies: Flame Ventures; Protocol Entertainment

Original release
- Network: MTV
- Release: February 26, 2010

Turn the Beat Around is a 2010 MTV original film produced by MTV and Paramount Pictures.

== Plot ==
Turn the Beat Around focuses around a 21-year-old woman named Zoe (played by Romina D'Ugo) who dreams of becoming a famous dancer similar to her idol Malika (played by Brooklyn Sudano) and she persuades a local dance club owner Michael Krasny (played by David Giuntoli) to open a disco-themed danceclub. Zoe's rather unsupportive boyfriend Chris (played by Adam T. Brooks) doesn't approve of their partnership. The film features original music performed by Just Kait and Jason Derülo.

== Cast ==
- Romina D'Ugo as Zoe
- David Giuntoli as Michael Krasny
- Adam T. Brooks as Chris
- Brooklyn Sudano as Malika
- Shauna MacDonald as Cynthia
- David Keeley as Roy
- Jacqueline MacInnes Wood as Irena
- Dewshane Williams as Ramon
- Simin Aamin as Selma
- Kevin McGarry as Jonah
- Shawn Byfield as Asa
- Miles Faber as D-Day
- Jason Derulo as himself
