= You've Got to Walk It Like You Talk It or You'll Lose That Beat =

1971 comedy-drama film directed by Peter Locke

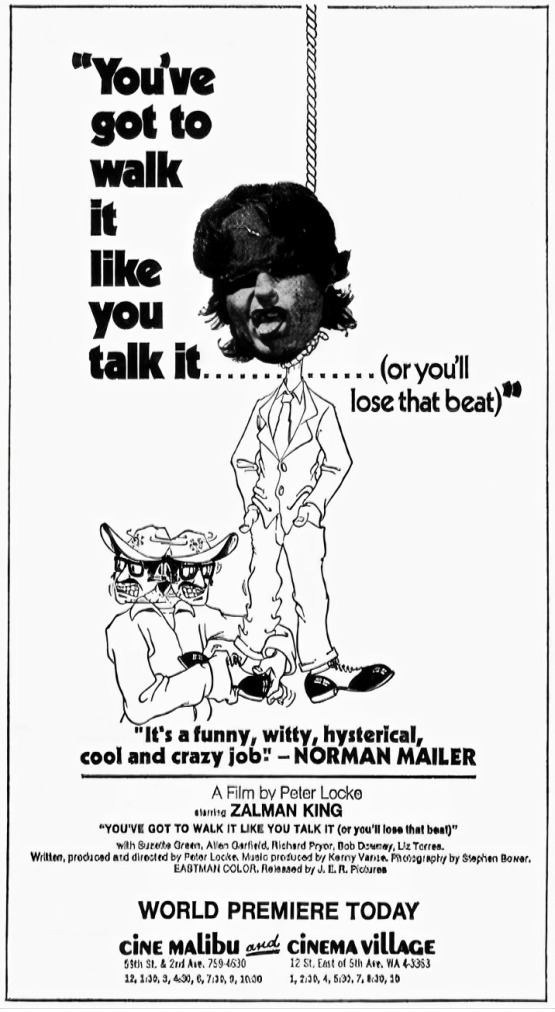
- Theatrical movie poster
- Directed by: Peter Locke
- Written by: Peter Locke
- Produced by: Peter Locke; Gary Mehlman; Ron Sullivan; David Finfer
- Starring: Zalman King; Richard Pryor; Allen Garfield; Robert Downey Sr. Liz Torres; Stan Gottlieb; Daisy Locke; Roz Kelly; Suzette Green
- Cinematography: Steve Bower
- Edited by: Wes Craven; David Finfer; Lana Jokel; Peter Locke
- Music by: The Original Soundtrack (Walter Becker; Donald Fagen)
- Distributed by: J.E.R. Pictures
- Release date: September 19, 1971
- Running time: 85 minutes
- Country: United States
- Language: English

You've Got to Walk It Like You Talk It or You'll Lose That Beat (also known as You Gotta Walk It Like You Talk It or You'll Lose That Beat) is a 1971 American low-budget comedy-drama film directed and written by Peter Locke and starring Zalman King. The story concerns a young hippie and his search in New York City for the meaning of life.

The film is believed lost.

It is notable for early-career appearances by several artists: Richard Pryor has a small role playing his signature "wino" character; Wes Craven made his professional debut as the film's editor; the film's soundtrack was co-written and performed by Walter Becker and Donald Fagen, who went on to form Steely Dan.

The film marks the second collaboration between Zalman King and Richard Pryor. The two had previously starred in the pilot episode for the TV show The Young Lawyers.

== Preservation status ==
A 33-minute VHS video containing excerpts from the film was discovered in August 2026 by Jake Malooley and published in his Expanding Dan newsletter.

== Plot ==
Carter Fields is a 25-year-old naïve, idealistic hippie/yippie only interested in sexual intercourse, but as the narrator would say "he doesn’t know his ass from a hole in the ground." He works as a stockbroker in New York City on Wall Street in the late 1960s, but is hindered by his domineering mother in the progress of looking for a more meaningful life.

One day Carter visits New York City's Central Park possibly to commit suicide by hanging but fails in the endeavour as the rope breaks. He is then assaulted by a "Fat Black Lady" for staring at people. After the lady jumps up and down on him, he witnesses a young hippie mooning an old lady with his vibrantly painted derriere as she yells obscenities. In utter disbelief Carter runs to a men's restroom to get away from the absurdity, where he is badgered by a garrulous drunk wino. A woman wearing tight black lace then emerges through the floor tiles while singing "Goin' Out Of My Head" in a thick Spanish accent. One of her customers tries to drown himself in a water basin while another is seated on the toilet reading a magazine with the door open.

Carter's runs into various obstacles while pursuing sexual and emotional fulfillment, including nosebleeds. Depressed, Carter fumbles a series of suicide attempts but finally realizes it's his job that's killing him and quits soon after. A now unemployed Carter ends up in an Alcoholics Anonymous meeting, but finds that his group is composed of an assortment of neurotics. During one of these meetings he meets Herby Moss, a big bellied con artist, modern-day Fagin and sex-fiend who spends most of his time in group therapy meetings being an obnoxious creep. He is the mastermind behind the "Campfire Girl Pickpockets," who steal while dressed as schoolgirls.

Carter initially latches onto Herby but later ditches him and is able to seduce Herby's girl using Herby's own technique. Still on the search for the meaning of life, Carter gets a job with the New York City's Traffic Control Bureau, but is later fired for incompetence. He then falls in with a group of revolutionaries out to bomb city highways. He becomes intimate with one of the revolutionaries but is soon kicked out, once again for incompetence. He witnesses a racist policemen shoot a woman in the face hoping she was a south east Asian. He later meets a sweet, old lady who also turns out to be a professional shop lifter. He continues witnessing, and gets dragged into, more bizarre events. Carter thinks he's found what he's been searching for when he meets and begins dating a woman named Susan. The two get married and Susan becomes pregnant. Around this time Carter gets a job at a posh advertising agency on Madison Avenue, he decides to take photos of the birth of his child for a commercial about birthing. Fields' happiness is cut-short because, before long, he is once again fired for his incompetence.

Depressed once more, Carter runs into a Puerto Rican pickpocket whom he had helped get arrested at the beginning of the movie but is now rehabilitated, for which he thanksCarter. Realizing Carter is depressed, the former pickpocket gives him the meaning of life speech that Carter desperately needs. Unfortunately for Carter the speech is completely in Spanish and Carter doesn't understand a word.

Eventually his wife deserts him and leaves him with their baby. Feeling there's nothing left to lose, he returns to Central Park with his child, sitting forlornly on a park bench, still searching for the meaning of life.

== Cast ==
- Zalman King as Carter Fields
- Suzette Green as Susan
- Allen Garfield as Herby Moss
- Richard Pryor as wino
- Robert Downey Sr. as head of ad agency
- Liz Torres as singer in men's room
- Roz Kelly as girl in park
- Karen Ludwig as Erica
- Stan Gottlieb as Fallestrio
- Peter Locke as shoe thief / purse snatcher
- Daisy Locke as old woman
- Ruth Locke as Carter's mother
- Billy Cunningham as fat lady
- Chick Kozloff as Mooner (credited sometimes as Chuck Kozloff)
- Michael Sullivan as man on toilet
- Steve Landesberg as men's room attendant
- Tommy Cerafice as boy in men's room
- Erik Krupnik as hood in group therapy
- Stephen Berke as food eater on park bench
- Anne Taylor as pickpocket
- Karen Smith as pickpocket
- S.T Louis as gynaecologist
- Jan Smith as garbage eater
- Walter Klushner as father
- Anthony Middleton as strangler (credited as Tony Middleton)
- GeeGee Brown as woman being strangled
- Paula Frankle as Corinna
- John Fondor as revolutionary
- Elaine Everett as Anita Lorraine Teitelbaum
- Rodger Parsons as the narrator (credited as Roger Parsons)
- Herb Futoran as man in board room meeting
- Jeff Futoran as son with mother in park
- Nicole Futoran as the baby
- Roni Futoran as mother with son in park
- Orson Bean as himself

== Production ==
The film was shot on 16mm Eastman Color film through 1969–1970 but was not released until 1971. It was filmed entirely on location in New York City. In an interview on KPFK-Los Angeles’s Captain Midnight Show in 1977, Walter Becker said of the film: "It was underbudgeted, which means that some of the exposures didn’t match some of the others so you could tell where the new pieces and the old pieces were". In a 2006 interview Locke spoke about the likelihood of the film getting a DVD release, stating: "I don’t know – who knows. It isn’t a very good film. I mean, Richard Pryor is great in it but as for releasing it… I don’t know about that. I think that film might be in the cemetery although you never know with DVD. It all ends up coming out so who knows". Cartoonist Peter Bramley did the illustration for both the movie poster and soundtrack. Donald Fagen had a cameo in the film which did not make the final edit.

== Soundtrack ==
You Gotta Walk It Like You Talk It or You'll Lose That Beat

Soundtrack album by The Original Soundtrack
- Released: 1971
- Recorded: 1970
- Length: 31:22
- Label: Spark Records
- Producer: Kenny Vance

Professional ratings
Review scores
Source	Rating
AllMusic	3/5 stars

The soundtrack album, produced by Kenny Vance and credited to "The Original Soundtrack", was released in 1971. The later reissues of the album are credited to Walter Becker & Donald Fagen. In a contemporary review of the film in The New York Times, the music is credited to "Walter Becker, Donald Fagin [sic] and Billy Cunningham" but Cunningham's involvement is not reflected in any published album credits.

Walter Becker stated "We became embroiled in it when the suggestion was made that if we would simply go into a recording studio and record however many minutes’ worth of dog meat is on this album, we would each get a check for $250 or some similar amount to that".

1. "You Gotta Walk It Like You Talk It" (Becker, Fagen, Peter Locke) – 2:47
2. "Flotsam And Jetsam" (Becker, Fagen, Kenny Vance) – 3:25
3. "War And Peace" (John Discepolo) – 1:33
4. "Roll Back The Meaning" (Becker, Fagen, Dorothy White) – 3:39
5. "You Gotta Walk It Like You Talk It (Reprise)" (Becker, Fagen, Peter Locke) – 0:37
6. "Dog Eat Dog" (Becker, Fagen) – 3:36
7. "Red Giant/White Dwarf" (Becker, Fagen, Kenny Vance) – 7:47
8. "If It Rains" (Becker, Fagen) – 6:52

=== Personnel ===
- Walter Becker – guitar, bass, arrangements
- Donald Fagen – keyboards, vocals, arrangements
- Denny Dias – guitar, percussion (credited as Denny Diaz)
- John Discepolo – drums
- Kenny Vance – lead vocals ("Roll Back The Meaning", "If It Rains")
- Marty Kupersmith – lead vocals ("You Gotta Walk It Like You Talk It")

== Critical reception ==
The film was screened in a few theatres in and around New York City but mainly Cinema Village and Cine Malibu.

A.H. Weiler in The New York Times wrote that the film: "projects lots of walking and talking but precious little heartfelt beat, despite its willing cast and a plethora of sight gags and surface philosophies."

Variety wrote:

Low budget socially conscious comedy which is sometimes refreshingly hilarious, but more often flat and tasteless. Also, inadequate production values. ... Although some of the screwball dialog, preposterous sight gags and bit character roles are hilarious, the film suffers from a weak storyline, comic situations that are overdone and tasteless, sloppy editing and color, and camerawork that is too often blurred and shaky. These negative factors give You've Got To Walk It... little chance of b.o. success. It may, however, have some appeal to New Yorkers, youth audiences, and devout followers of Robert Downey (director of Putney Swope [1969]) who has a cameo role. In fact, it appears that Locke has been significantly influenced by Downey's brand of comedy, and that of Brian de Palma (Hi Mom! [1970]), He is, however, less disciplined, less technically proficient, and less adept at introducing elements of "bad taste," without making them seem utterly vulgar. Zalman King, as the young man, mugs well, but otherwise walks blandly through a bland role. Suzette Green, as his girl, minus the mugging, does likewise. Allen Garfield, as a sort of contemporary Fagin, is humorously greasy and lecherous; and the rest of the performers ham up their roles. But they all seem participants in a comedy revue. Use of silent movie titles, mock-melodramatic narration, soap-opera organ music and other stylistic gimmicks are amusing for a while, but it all suffers from chaotic excess. Locke includes anything for a laugh and doesn't seem to care where or how often he uses it, Consequently, the film moves in spurts of hilarity with too many lags between them.

In the New York Daily News Ann Guarino wrote: "Masquerading as satire, the comedy as written, produced and directed by 27-year-old Peter Locke, is sophomoric and absolutely dull."

The film is described by TV Guide as "A mishmash of intent and execution and too annoyingly clumsy to watch."

The Independent Film Journal said: "This film's satire never touches reality in an effective enough way for it to hit its marks. There just isn't enough bite and where there is, it is generally misplaced."

Archer Winsten in the New York Post wrote: "It is a picture that leaves a dent on your consciousness because it goes out of its way to do so, but when you try to remember what it was about, ten minutes afterwards it has vanished, like something very wet poured on sand."
