= American Hot Wax =

1978 film by Floyd Mutrux

- Theatrical release poster
- Directed by: Floyd Mutrux
- Screenplay by: John Kaye
- Story by: John Kaye; Art Linson
- Produced by: Art Linson
- Starring: Tim McIntire; Fran Drescher; Jay Leno; Laraine Newman; Moosie Drier; Jeff Altman; John Lehne; Richard Perry; Chuck Berry; Jerry Lee Lewis; Screamin' Jay Hawkins; Frankie Ford; Charles Greene
- Cinematography: William A. Fraker
- Edited by: Ronald J. Fagan; Melvin Shapiro; Danford B. Greene (sup)
- Music by: Kenny Vance
- Production company: Paramount Pictures
- Distributed by: Paramount Pictures
- Release date: March 17, 1978
- Running time: 91 minutes
- Country: United States
- Language: English
- Budget: $4 million
- Box office: $11 million

American Hot Wax is a 1978 biographical film directed by Floyd Mutrux with a screenplay by John Kaye from a story by John Kaye and Art Linson. The film tells the story of pioneering disc jockey Alan Freed, who in the 1950s helped introduce and popularize rock and roll, and is often credited with coining the term "rock 'n' roll". The film starred Tim McIntire, Fran Drescher, Jay Leno, Laraine Newman, Jeff Altman, and Moosie Drier. It also featured musical performances by Chuck Berry, Jerry Lee Lewis, Frankie Ford, Screamin' Jay Hawkins, and Brooklyn Dreams as "Professor La Plano and The Planotones". The film was not a box-office success.

A&M Records released a two-record soundtrack album featuring the film's live Brooklyn Paramount performances on record one (in stereo) and the film's soundtrack (the original monophonic hit recordings) on record two. The LP reached number 31 on the Billboard charts.

Producer Art Linson discusses the movie's production and its box office failure in his book What Just Happened? Bitter Hollywood Tales from the Front Line.

== Plot ==
In late-1950s New York City, WROL disc jockey Alan Freed promotes his upcoming rock n' roll show at the Brooklyn Paramount Theater, headlined by Chuck Berry and Jerry Lee Lewis. Freed's radio program is hugely popular with teenagers, and the Paramount show is expected to sell out, despite concern that the police will shut it down as they did with Freed's previous show in Boston. Local law enforcement, led by D.A. Coleman, targets Freed for allegedly inciting teenagers to wild and immoral behavior by broadcasting raucous and sexually suggestive rock n' roll songs, many of them by black musicians. WROL station management also dislike Freed's unconventional programming habits, including playing songs that the station has banned such as "Tutti Frutti" by Little Richard. Freed nevertheless rejects all suggestions that he change his programming style and feature more socially acceptable musical acts, such as Pat Boone. He also refuses to sign a statement declaring that he never accepted anything in return for playing a record, on the grounds that signing it would be a lie and that all disc jockeys, including those who have signed the statement, take such bribes.

Because Freed has the power to make a record a hit by playing it on his show, he is constantly besieged by record promoters and artist managers. He avoids most of these people, but takes an interest in those who share his love for rock n' roll. He repeatedly rebuffs the aggressive record promoter Lennie Richfield, but is kind to Artie Moress, a young boy who is the president of a Buddy Holly fan club, and even puts Artie on the air to talk about his idol Holly. Freed also encourages Louise, a white teenage songwriter whose parents ignore her talent and disapprove of her associating with the Chesterfields, a black doo-wop group who perform her songs. Freed himself suffers discrimination when he takes a racially mixed group of teenagers with him to look at a luxury home he wants to buy; the owner refuses to sell to him at any price. Freed's own father back in Akron, Ohio also rejects him, returning a check Freed sent him and refusing to talk on the telephone with his son.

The Paramount show goes on despite Coleman's attempts to stop it, including a failed attempt at a drug bust. Louise is moved to tears after the Chesterfields, a late addition to the show, perform her songs to thunderous applause from the capacity crowd. Freed's feisty young secretary Sheryl and his chauffeur Mookie, who have constantly bickered on the job, finally bond over their shared love of Freed and rock n' roll, and begin a romance. Mid-show, IRS agents appear and seize all the proceeds from the box office, leaving Freed with no money to pay his artists. However, Chuck Berry saves the day by doing Freed the favor of performing for free. Jerry Lee Lewis, who initially had said he was not coming, then arrives at the last minute and closes the show as the police try to shut it down because teenagers are "dancing in the aisles". As the police begin clearing the theater with Lewis still performing onstage, chaos breaks out and the film abruptly ends, with an epilogue stating that this was Freed's last performance, and that he was taken off the air, indicted, moved to California, and died five years later, penniless, but that rock n' roll lives on.

== Cast ==
- Tim McIntire—Alan Freed
- Fran Drescher—Sheryl
- Jay Leno—Mookie (Michael)
- Laraine Newman—Teenaged Louise
- Moosie Drier—Artie Moress
- Jeff Altman—Lennie Richfield
- John Lehne—D.A. Coleman
- Richard Perry—Record producer

Performers

- Chuck Berry—Himself
- Jerry Lee Lewis—Himself
- Screamin' Jay Hawkins—Himself
- Frankie Ford—Himself
- Charles Greene—Chuck Otis

The Chesterfields

- Carl Earl Weaver
- Al Chalk
- Sam Harkness
- Arnold McCuller

The Delights

- Stephanie Spruill
- Joyce King
- Yolanda Howard
- Brenda Russell

Timmy and The Tulips (erroneously shown as "Timmy and The Tangerines" in the end credits)

- Charles Irwin—Timmy
- Jeanne Sheffield
- Jo Ann Harris

The Planotones

- Kenny Vance—Professor La Plano
- Joe Esposito
- Bruce Sudano
- Ed Hokenson

== Soundtrack ==
The soundtrack album was released by A&M Records as a double vinyl. The first disc contained the live concert shown at the end of the movie. The second disc was a compilation of original recordings from the 1950s.

=== Track listing ===
Live album - Side one
No.	Title	Writer(s)	Performer	Length
1.	"Hot Wax Theme"	P. Griffin, I. Newborn, K. Vance	Big Beat Band	2:17
2.	"Rock And Roll Is Here To Stay"	D. White	Prof. LaPlano And The Planotones	4:13
3.	"Mister Lee"	E. R. Pought, H. Gathers, J. Pought, L. Webb, H. Dixon	Delights	2:37
4.	"Maybe"	R. Barrett	Delights	3:30
5.	"Hey Little Girl"	B. Stevenson, O. Blackwell	Clark Otis	2:49
6.	"Reelin' And Rockin'"	C. Berry	Chuck Berry	2:55
7.	"Roll Over Beethoven"	C. Berry	Chuck Berry	1:59

Live album - Side two
No.	Title	Writer(s)	Performer	Length
8.	"Why Do Fools Fall In Love"	F. Lymon, M. Levy	The Chesterfields	2:40
9.	"That Is Rock And Roll"	J. Leiober, M. Stoller	The Chesterfields	3:50
10.	"I Put A Spell On You"	J. Hawkins	Screamin' Jay Hawkins	4:20
11.	"Mister Blue"	D. Blackwell	Timmy & The Tulips	2:42
12.	"Whole Lotta Shakin' Goin On"	D. Williams, S. David	Jerry Lee Lewis	3:02
13.	"Great Balls Of Fire"	J. Hammer, O. Blackwell	Jerry Lee Lewis	2:00

Compilation album - Side one
No.	Title	Writer(s)	Performer	Length
1.	"Sweet Little Sixteen"	C. Berry	Chuck Berry	3:00
2.	"That's Why (I Love You So)"	B. Gordy, T. Carlo	Jackie Wilson	2:03
3.	"Sincerely"	A. Freed, H. Fuqua	The Moonglows	3:09
4.	"There Goes My Baby"	B. Nelson, G. Treadwell, L. Patterson	The Drifters	2:07
5.	"Hushabye"	D. Pomus, M. Shuman	The Mystics	2:31
6.	"Rave On"	B. Tilgham, N. Petty, S. West	Buddy Holly	1:47
7.	"Stay"	M. Williams	Maurice Williams & The Zodiacs	1:37

Compilation album - Side two
No.	Title	Writer(s)	Performer	Length
8.	"Tutti Frutti"	D. LaBostrie, R. Penniman	Little Richard	2:22
9.	"Zoom"	E. Navarro	The Cadillacs	2:21
10.	"Little Star"	A. Venosa, V. Picone	The Elegants	2:38
11.	"When You Dance"	A. Jones	The Turbans	2:55
12.	"Splish Splash"	B. Darin, J. Murray	Bobby Darin	2:10
13.	"Sea Cruise"	F. Ford	Frankie Ford	2:41
14.	"Goodnight It's Time To Go"	C. Carter, J. Hudson	The Spaniels	2:44

== Reception and legacy ==
The film was a box-office bomb. However, head of Paramount Michael Eisner loved the movie and saw it nearly a dozen times. Critic Pauline Kael praised the performances and approvingly called the film "a super B-movie" and "trashily enjoyable". Janet Maslin of The New York Times wrote that "'American Hot Wax,' which has a plot so thin you could thread a needle with it, chooses to see the era strictly in terms of the B-movie melodramas it produced." Arthur D. Murphy of Variety called the film "unpretentious and enjoyable." Gene Siskel gave the film three stars out of four and wrote, "At its worst, 'Hot Wax' comes off as a 92-minute, 'blasts-from-the-past,' TV record offer ... At its best, the film does manage to suggest some of the frenzied innocence of rock's early days, before rock became a multibillion-dollar industry." Kevin Thomas of the Los Angeles Times found the film "enjoyable and at times poignant", although he noted the film seemed "evasive" on the issue of "Freed's involvement with payola (a word, incidentally, never heard in the film)." Gary Arnold of The Washington Post wrote, "Director Floyd Mutrux and screenwriter John Kaye evidently fail to perceive that the liveliest elements in their movie contradict their admiring view of Freed as a pop-culture hero and martyr ... the filmmakers insist on looking at their subject matter through rose-colored glasses."

Author Charles Taylor included this film in his 2017 book Opening Wednesday at a Theater or Drive-in Near You.

== Charts ==
Chart (1978)	Peak position
Australia (Kent Music Report)	68

== See also ==
- New Hollywood
- United States in the 1950s
