= Kenny Vance =

American singer-songwriter (born 1943)

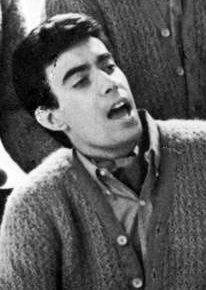
- Vance in 1963
- Born: Kenneth Rosenberg; December 9, 1943 (age 82); Brooklyn, New York, U.S.
- Occupations: Singer, songwriter, music production and supervision
- Known for: Founding member of Jay and the Americans; Musical director for Saturday Night Live
- Musical career
- Genres: Pop rock
- Formerly of: Jay and the Americans

Kenny Vance (born Kenneth Rosenberg, December 9, 1943) is an American singer, songwriter, and music producer who was a founding member of Jay and the Americans. His career spans from the 1950s to today, with projects ranging from starting doo-wop groups to music supervising to creating solo albums.

Vance is also known for discovering and working with Walter Becker and Donald Fagen, the two men who later became Steely Dan; Vance produced the first album the two worked on together, the soundtrack for the 1971 film You've Got to Walk It Like You Talk It or You'll Lose That Beat. He was also musical director for the Saturday Night Live band from 1980 to 1981.

== Career ==
=== Early career ===
Born in Brooklyn, Vance grew up hanging around the famous Brill Building, the Tin Pan Alley song machine, and started his first vocal group, the Harbor Lites, at 15. The group recorded two singles for Ivy Records in 1959. An early single, "Is That Too Much To Ask", experienced local popularity due to radio promotion by disc jockey Cousin Brucie. He then formed another group and auditioned for Jerry Leiber and Mike Stoller, who signed them to United Artists Records, and named the group Binky Jones and the Americans, which they tweaked to Jay and the Americans.

=== Jay and the Americans ===
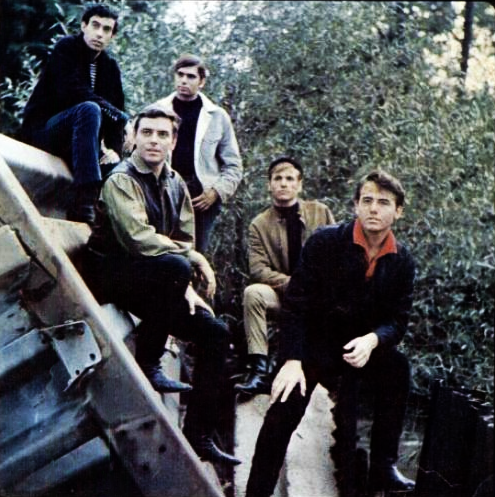
Vance (first from left) with Jay and the Americans in 1965

Jay and the Americans released fifteen albums, and their first hit was "She Cried", which was released in 1962. The group's musical style evoked nostalgia for 1950s rock and roll and doo wop. The group was the opening act for not only the Beatles' first US performance, in Washington, D.C., but also for the Rolling Stones at Carnegie Hall, the final stop on the Rolling Stones' tour. They also appeared on The Tonight Show Starring Johnny Carson. They had many other hit singles and an album, Capture the Moment, in the 1960s, blending doo wop harmonies with contemporary sounds. In 1969, they self-produced the album Sands of Time, featuring songs originated by the Drifters ("This Magic Moment") and the Ronettes ("Walkin' in the Rain"). Both songs hit the Top 40 singles chart. They also started their own publishing and production company, JATA Enterprises. Their last release was in 1971, and the group broke up in 1974.

Vance performed as a vocalist on every record by Jay and the Americans made during their original run, from 1961 to 1971. In 2017, "Come a Little Bit Closer", a hit for Jay and the Americans in 1964, was featured in the soundtrack for Guardians of the Galaxy Vol. 2. The soundtrack album went gold in the U.S. and sold more than 2.5 million copies worldwide.

=== Steely Dan ===
In 1967, the songwriting duo of Walter Becker and Donald Fagen came to the Brill Building to sell their songs, and ended up knocking on Vance's door. Vance liked what he heard, and offered to manage and produce them. The duo arranged horn and string sections for Jay and the Americans recordings and toured with them as bassist and keyboardist. Vance produced the soundtrack album for the movie You've Got to Walk It Like You Talk It or You'll Lose That Beat for Becker and Fagen in 1969. He continued to work with Becker & Fagen until 1971, when he brought one of their songs ("I Mean to Shine") to Richard Perry, who then brought it to Barbra Streisand and recorded it on Barbra Joan Streisand. They were hired as songwriters at ABC Dunhill Records, and released their first Steely Dan album, Can't Buy a Thrill, in 1972. They went on to become one of the best selling and critically acclaimed bands of the 1970s. In Steely Dan FAQ: All That's Left to Know About This Elusive Band, Anthony Robustelli wrote, "For all intents and purposes, Vance should be credited as the man who discovered the core of Steely Dan."

=== Production, film and television ===
After this, Vance began doing session work and producing, including albums by Toni Basil, Danny O'Keefe (American Roulette), and Diane Keaton. He released a solo album, Vance 32, on Atlantic Records in 1975. He was the music supervisor for the movies Eddie and the Cruisers, Animal House (which also featured an uncredited Robert Cray as bass player with fictional group, Otis Day and the Knights) and American Hot Wax with Tim McIntire, Jay Leno, and Fran Drescher. He wrote the theme for the score, produced the soundtrack album (which made the Top 40), and appeared in the movie as "Professor La Plano" to lead his fictional group, the Planotones, in a performance of "Rock and Roll Is Here to Stay". The Animal House soundtrack also made the charts and sold over one million copies and the soundtrack album of Eddie and the Cruisers, initially a flop as a movie, went triple platinum when the movie became a surprise cult hit. Vance also produced and commissioned the soundtrack for The Warriors, curating a diverse lineup of artists including Arnold McCuller, Barry De Vorzon, and backup vocals from a then-unknown Luther Vandross.

Vance contributed music for many other films and TV shows. He was a guest vocalist on Saturday Night Live in 1977 (singing a live version of his current single "The Performer"), and became the program's musical director in 1980–1981, booking the show's musical acts. He booked Aretha Franklin and Prince, as well as James Brown, who on his only appearance on the show performed for far longer than his allotted time, forcing the producers to go to a commercial while he was still singing. In addition to his appearance in American Hot Wax, Vance has also played bit parts in films including Eddie and the Cruisers, Billy Bathgate, and Hurlyburly. He also appeared in six Woody Allen films.

=== 1990s and later ===
In 1992, Vance started a doo wop group, the re-formed (no longer fictional) Kenny Vance and The Planotones from American Hot Wax. They released two albums "Teenage Jazz" and "Looking for an Echo", and then created the whole soundtrack for the 1999 film Looking for an Echo, for which Vance was also the musical director and the singing voice of Armand Assante. Since then the group has released eight more albums, including "Lovers Island", Countdown to Love", "Dancing and Romancing", "Oceans of Time", and their holiday album, "Mr. Santa". They continue to perform to audiences nationwide and on PBS.

Vance was inducted into the Vocal Group Hall of Fame as part of Jay and the Americans in 2002, and into the Long Island Music Hall of Fame in 2008. In 2012, Hurricane Sandy destroyed Vance's oceanfront home of 38 years in Rockaway Beach, Queens. Vance did not perform from 2014 to 2017 for health reasons.

Kenny Vance and the Planotones released a new album, "For Your Love", in 2020. During the COVID-19 pandemic, Vance reunited with members of the original Planotones to record "Brave Companions", a song he wrote in tribute to first responders, with proceeds donated to the First Responders Children's Foundation. He also directed a documentary, Heart & Soul, about music performers of the doo wop era. Doc NYC selected the film for its "Only In New York" program.

== Reception ==
Vance has received recognition for his role in the history of doo wop and music. Dion DiMucci told Elmore Magazine in 2008, "Kenny Vance...sings like there's a 19-year-old angel inside of him. ... Kenny Vance expresses the heart and soul of doo wop." In 2009, Brooklyn Paper called Vance the "Dylan of Doo-Wop". Radio disc jockey Jerry Blavat said in 2011 that Vance has "the ability to take a song, which was a hit in the '50s or early '60s and with his style make it fashionable for a new audience that hears it in a different way."

Vance is in the Vocal Group Hall of Fame as part of Jay and the Americans and in the Long Island Music Hall of Fame.

== Filmography ==
Music Department:

- 1971: You've Got to Walk It Like You Talk It or You'll Lose That Beat (music producer)
- 1978: American Hot Wax (music producer, music supervisor)
- 1979: The Warriors (music supervisor: additional music)
- 1980: The Hollywood Knights (soundtrack producer)
- 1980–1981: Saturday Night Live (TV series) (musical director)
- 1983: Eddie and the Cruisers (music producer, music supervisor, – Lead vocal on "Those Oldies but Goodies (Remind Me of You)")
- 1988: Hairspray (Producer title song, composer)
- 1989: Eddie and the Cruisers II: Eddie Lives! (music supervisor)
- 1989: Heart of Dixie (composer: additional music, orchestrator: additional music)
- 1992: Hard Promises (composer: additional music)
- 1996: Erotic Confessions: Volume 1 (video) (musician: "The Performer")
- 1998: Into My Heart (music supervisor)
- 1999: Sunburn (music supervisor, music producer)
- 1999: Story of a Bad Boy (music supervisor)
- 1999: Just Looking (music supervisor)
- 2000: Looking for an Echo (music producer, music supervisor, score producer, singing voice: Armand Assante)
- 2001: Piñero (music supervisor)

Actor:

- 1978: American Hot Wax
- 1979: Manhattan
- 1980: Stardust Memories
- 1983: Eddie and the Cruisers
- 1986: Sweethearts
- 1987: Power, Passion and Murder
- 1987: Great Performances (TV series)
- 1987: Tales from the Hollywood Hills: A Table at Ciro's (TV movie)
- 1989: Crimes and Misdemeanors
- 1991: Billy Bathgate
- 1992: Husbands and Wives
- The Last Bachelor
- 1996: Everyone Says I Love You
- 1997: Deconstructing Harry
- 1998: Hurlyburly
- 2000: Looking for an Echo
- 2007: Kenny Vance and the Planotones: Live at the Cuillo (video)
