= Johnnyswim =

American musical duo

- Origin: Nashville, Tennessee, United States
- Genres: Folk; soul; blues; pop
- Years active: 2005–present
- Members: Amanda Sudano; Abner Ramirez
- Website: johnnyswim.com

Johnnyswim is an American folk, soul, blues, and pop music duo consisting of singer-songwriters Amanda Sudano and Abner Ramirez, formed in 2005 in Nashville, Tennessee.

== Origin ==
Ramirez trained as a musician at Douglas Anderson School of the Arts in his native Jacksonville, Florida.

Ramirez and Sudano first met after Sunday service at a church in Nashville, Tennessee. Four years later, in 2005, Sudano attended a songwriting workshop held by Ramirez and became interested in writing songs with him.

== Career ==
Johnnyswim independently released their first self-titled EP on June 30, 2008.

In 2009, the duo collaborated with Bruce Sudano on the track "Morning Song" which appeared on his record Life and the Romantic.

In 2010, they released their second EP, 5-8 and toured around the country.

In 2011, they released the single "Bonsoir". In September that year, the duo traveled to India with VisitingOrphans.org. Inspired by their experiences there, they wrote the track "Hallelujah" featuring Tulsi. It was released in December 2011 with all profits going to the efforts of the charity.

On April 24, 2012, they saw the release of their third EP Home, Vol. 1, a new collection of songs as well as the release of the single "Annie". The unsigned duo hit their stride and received support from major brands like Apple, Louis Vuitton and Tommy Hilfiger.

Johnnyswim were guests on the November 17, 2012 broadcast of the live radio variety show A Prairie Home Companion. They also appeared on The Tonight Show with Jay Leno on July 15, 2013. Johnnyswim performed "Don't Let It Get You Down" from their fourth EP Heart Beats on The Late Late Show with Craig Ferguson on September 13, 2013.

The duo signed a recording contract with Big Picnic Records. In 2014, Johnnyswim released their first full-length record, Diamonds. Diamonds held the number one spot on the Singer/Songwriter chart for several weeks.

On February 13, 2014, Johnnyswim were guests on episode 65 of the program Live From Daryl's House, joining Daryl Hall and the house band in performing seven songs. In April the same year, they performed a Tiny Desk Concert at NPR's All Songs Considered.

In December 2014, Joanna Gaines announced on Twitter that the Johnnyswim song "Home" would become the theme song for the HGTV show Fixer Upper.

In 2016, Johnnyswim released the studio album Georgica Pond and the live album Live at Rockwood Music Hall.

In 2019, Johnnyswim released their studio album Moonlight. That same year, Chip Gaines and Joanna Gaines revealed plans for their own television network, Magnolia Network, and the first production show with the working title, Home on the Road, which would follow Johnnyswim's Abner Ramirez and Amanda Sudano Ramirez, as well as their kids and band members, on their North American tour. Under the title, Home on the Road with Johhnyswim, the series premiered in January 2021. A second series, The Johnnyswim Show, aired that July.

In May 2021, Johnnyswim announced they were publishing a book called Home Sweet Road: Finding Love, Making Music, and Building a Life One City at a Time on June 8.

In February 2022, Johnnyswim released "Heaven is Everywhere", the lead single from their eponymous fourth studio album. In support of the album, which was released on April 8, the duo also announced a tour that began on March 24, 2022.

== Personal life ==
In 2009, Sudano and Ramirez married. Together, they have three children.

== Discography ==
Studio albums

- Diamonds (2014)
- Georgica Pond (2016)
- Moonlight (2019)
- Johnnyswim (2022)
- When the War Is Over (2025)

Live albums

- Johnnyswim Live at Rockwood Music Hall (2016)

Holiday albums

- A Johnnyswim Christmas (2014)

EPs

- Johnnyswim (2008)
- 5-8 (2010)
- Home, Vol. 1 (2012)
- Heart Beats (2013)

Singles

- "You're Not Gonna Leave Me Here" (2008)
- "Letting Go" (2008)
- "Why'd You Do It" (2008)
- "Away I Go" (2008)
- "Good News" (2008)
- "Morning Song" (2009) with Bruce Sudano
- "Bonsoir" (2011)
- "Hallelujah" (2011) (charity song with Tulsi)
- "Heart Beats" (2012)
- "Adelina" (2012)
- "Home" (2012)
- "Annie" (2012)
- "Forever On Your Side" (2018) with Needtobreathe
- "Say What You Will (Acoustic) (2019)
- "Bridges" (2019)
- "Souvenir (2019)
- "The Last Time" (2019) with Michael McDonald
- "Flowers" (2019)
- "Devastating" (2021)
- "Heaven Is Everywhere" (2022)
