= You're the Best =

Song by Joe Esposito

from the album The Karate Kid Soundtrack
- Released: 1984
- Recorded: 1984
- Genre: Synth-rock, hard rock
- Length: 2:54
- Label: Casablanca
- Songwriters: Bill Conti (music), Allee Willis (lyrics)

Audio
- "You're the Best" by Joe Esposito on YouTube

"You're the Best" is a song performed by Joe Esposito and written by Bill Conti (music) and Allee Willis (lyrics), which came to prominence as the music to the All-Valley Karate Championships montage in the 1984 movie The Karate Kid in which the protagonist, Daniel LaRusso (Ralph Macchio), proves to be a surprisingly formidable contender.

== Criticism ==
Responding to years of criticism of "You're the Best" on the radio, singer Joe Esposito called into The Adam Carolla Show on April 9, 2008. The criticism was that the lyric "History repeats itself" was inappropriate because it was played during Daniel LaRusso's (Ralph Macchio) first All-Valley Tournament in The Karate Kid. Esposito revealed that the power ballad was originally intended for the Rocky III soundtrack, but was replaced by "Eye of the Tiger". It was subsequently also turned down for the Flashdance soundtrack in favor of "Maniac" by Michael Sembello. The Karate Kid's director, John G. Avildsen, liked the song so much that he used it in the movie.
