= Joe Esposito (singer) =

American singer/songwriter (born 1948)

- Also known as: Joe "Bean" Esposito
- Born: Joseph Patrick Esposito; May 5, 1948 (age 78); New York, New York, U.S.
- Genres: Pop; soul; soft rock; synth-pop
- Occupation: Singer-songwriter
- Years active: 1977–present

Joseph Patrick Esposito also known as Joe "Bean" Esposito (born May 5, 1948) is an American singer-songwriter whose career spans from the 1970s to the present day. Esposito is known for creating songs that have appeared in film soundtracks, such as those of American Hot Wax, Staying Alive, Scarface, The Karate Kid, and Coming to America. Several of his songs have also been recorded by Donna Summer, Aretha Franklin, Patti LaBelle, and Stephen Stills, among others.

== Career ==
Esposito was a member of the band Brooklyn Dreams, best known for their collaboration with Donna Summer on the US top ten hit "Heaven Knows". Esposito collaborated with producer Giorgio Moroder on the 1982 Solitary Men project, which became Esposito's first solo album. In 1983, Esposito contributed the song "Lady, Lady, Lady" to the Flashdance soundtrack album; the song also appeared on the Solitary Men album. In 1984, his song "You're the Best" was included in The Karate Kid film and soundtrack.

In 1984, the Flashdance soundtrack was nominated for Album of the Year at the Grammys; the soundtrack album contained one of Esposito's songs ("Lady, Lady, Lady") as well as songs from various other acts. In 1988, Brenda Russell and Esposito were nominated for Best Pop Duo for the song "Piano in the Dark", as he supplied vocals on the song as well. Also in 1988, he duetted with Laura Branigan on the song "Come into My Life" which appeared on the soundtrack to the film Coming to America. Joe performs as a vocalist at various casino hotels. During the early 1990s, he and Eddy Hokenson (of Brooklyn Dreams) toured with Kenny Vance and the Planotones, a vocal group created for the film American Hot Wax. In May 2013, Esposito became the lead singer for the Brooklyn Bridge band, formerly known as Johnny Maestro & the Brooklyn Bridge.

== Personal life ==
Joe Esposito was born in New York City in Brooklyn. He is the father of Mike Esposito, who pitched in 2005 for Major League Baseball's Colorado Rockies. He is a father of four. He is married to Lynda Esposito. Esposito lives in Las Vegas.

== Discography ==
- 1983: Solitary Men - Giorgio Moroder and Joe Esposito, produced by Giorgio Moroder, Oasis Records
- 1987: Joe, Bruce and Second Ave - produced by Michael Omartian, EMI America
- 1996: Treated and Released - produced by Joe Esposito, Pool Party Records

=== Soundtrack appearances ===
- American Hot Wax (1978) Kenny Vance on lead vocals with Brooklyn Dreams performing as The Planotones on backup
- Foxes (1980) lyrics: "Shake It" performed by the Brooklyn Dreams
- Zapped! (1982) performer: "Updikes Theme"
- Flashdance (1983) performer: "Lady, Lady, Lady"
- Staying Alive (1983) lyrics: "Hope We Never Change", "Moody Girl", "I'm Never Gonna Give You Up", "The Winning End"
- Scarface (1983) performer: "Success"
- The Karate Kid (1984) performer: "You're the Best"
- Lovelines (1984) performer: "A Time Like This Again"
- Thief of Hearts (1984) performer: "Just Imagine (Way Beyond Fear)"
- 3:15 - The Moment of Truth (1986) performer: "Out of Control" with Bob Conti
- Coming to America (1988) performer "Come into My Life" with Laura Branigan
- Butterbrot (1990) performer: "Take Me Home"
- Freak City (1999) performer: "Two Bad Boys"

=== Other appearances ===
- 1981: I'm a Rainbow - Donna Summer, performing "I Believe in You"
- 1988: Get Here - Brenda Russell, performing "Piano in the Dark"

== See also ==
- Brooklyn Dreams
- Donna Summer
- Bruce Sudano
- Alive N Kickin'
- The Mystics
- Laura Branigan
