= Serena Viti =

Astrophysicist

Serena Viti is a professor at Leiden University and previously was a professor and the head of Astrophysics at University College London. In March 2019 she received an ERC Advanced Grant for her MOPPEX proposal (MOlecules as Probes of the Physics of EXternal galaxies).

== Education ==
Viti was an undergraduate at Queen Mary and Westfield College, London, where she gained a BSc in Astrophysics in 1994. She was awarded a PhD from University College London (UCL) for her work on the infrared spectra of cool stars and sunspots in 1997. After her PhD, Viti became a post-doctoral fellow at UCL in the field of star formation and astrochemistry, followed by a fixed-term lectureship at the CNR in Rome as a Herschel Scientist. She returned to UCL in October 2003 for an STFC Advanced Fellowship and became a lecturer of Astrophysics in 2004. She was promoted to Reader in 2007 and to professor of astrophysics in 2012. Viti became head of the Astrophysics group at UCL in 2016. In July 2020 Leiden University (the Netherlands) announced that the Leiden Observatory had appointed Viti to a chair in Molecular Astrophysics.

== Research and career ==
Viti is on the editorial board for Molecular Astrophysics. She is the current secretary of the European Astronomical Society, was a Royal Astronomical Society council member (2002–2005), and serves on several STFC panels and committees. The central focus of her research is in the field of astrochemistry and the study of molecules in space. She is a member of the International Astronomical Union, the Royal Astronomical Society, the European Astronomical Society and the Astrophysical Chemistry Society. She led an exhibition on astrochemistry at the 2004 Royal Society Summer Exhibition. Viti has co-authored a book on observational molecular astronomy.

== Awards and honours ==
Viti was awarded the Royal Astronomical Society Fowler Award for Astronomy in 2006 and the Australian Astronomical Observatory Distinguished Visitor Fellowship in 2015.
