= American Roulette (album) =

Studio album by Danny O'Keefe
- Released: 1977
- Genre: Country
- Length: 41:58
- Label: Warner Bros. Records
- Producer: Kenny Vance

Danny O'Keefe chronology
So Long Harry Truman (1975)	American Roulette (1977)	The Seattle Tapes Vol. II (1978)

Professional ratings
Review scores
Source	Rating
Allmusic	3/5 stars

American Roulette is the fifth studio album by American country musician Danny O'Keefe released in 1977 on Warner Bros. Records.

== Track listing ==
1. "The Runaway" - 4:23
2. "Islands" - 3:34
3. "On Discovering A Missing Person" - 4:15
4. "The Hereafter" - 3:45
5. "You Look Just Like A Girl Again" - 4:20
6. "All My Friends" - 4:11
7. "Plastic Saddle" - 3:13
8. "In Northern California (Where The Palm Tree Meets The Pine)" - 3:23
9. "American Roulette" - 7:34
10. "Just Jones" - 3:20

== Personnel ==
Credits for American Roulette adapted from liner notes.

- Roger Bethelmy - drums
- Ollie E. Brown - conductor, congas
- John Court - guitar
- Laudir DeOliveira - percussion
- Bobbye Hall - conductor, congas
- John Hobbs - keyboards, piano, electric piano
- Charlie Irwin - organ
- Charlie "Fingers" Irwin - keyboards, organ
- Roger Kellaway - keyboards
- King Errisson - conductor, congas
- David Lindley - fiddle, rhythm guitar, steel guitar, vocals, background vocals
- Gary Mallaber - drums
- Vic McAlpin - composer
- Reggie McBride - bass
- Vince Melamed - keyboards, piano, organ
- Mike Melvoin - piano
- Randy Nicklaus - engineer
- Danny O'Keefe - composer, guitar, primary artist, vocals
- Dave Parlato - bass, drums, piano
- Steven Schaeffer - drums
- Tom Scott - saxophone, wind
- Scott Strong - guitar, rhythm guitar
- Alvin Taylor - drums
- Kenny Vance - producer, background vocals
- Peter Woodford - guitar
