= Fabrizio Viti =

Italian fashion shoes designer

Fabrizio Viti is an Italian fashion shoes designer. Born in Carrara on 22 February 1967, he has been the head shoes style director of the French fashion house Louis Vuitton since October 2004.

== Early life and career ==
Subsequently, his studies at the Istituto Marangoni, Fabrizio Viti started his collaboration with a Milan’s style studio and with Patrick Cox.

After his first experience, Fabrizio Viti was hired by Gucci, where he started to team up with Tom Ford on both man and women shoe collections.

From 1999, Fabrizio Viti worked for about 5 years for the Italian Fashion House Prada.

In October 2004, Viti was appointed Louis Vuitton’s head shoes style director where he directly collaborated with Marc Jacobs on the realization of man and woman collections and fashion shows.

Fabrizio Viti, besides his passion for shoes, is known for his fashion dolls collection, source of inspiration since his early age. Presently he owns more than 600 dolls and “LOVE magazine” decided to use one of them as cover model for its fourth issue. His collection features in a stop motion animated video, Walking in Fabrizio Viti's shoes.

In June 2016 his first collection, "Please don't Eat the Daisies", has been presented bearing the Fabrizio Viti label.
