= Heaven Knows (Donna Summer song) =

- German single picture sleeve

Single by Donna Summer featuring Brooklyn Dreams

from the album Live and More
- B-side: "Only One Man (Live)"
- Released: December 9, 1978
- Recorded: 1978
- Genre: Disco
- Length: 3:39
- Label: Casablanca
- Songwriters: Donna Summer, Giorgio Moroder, Pete Bellotte
- Producers: Giorgio Moroder, Pete Bellotte

Donna Summer featuring Brooklyn Dreams singles chronology
"MacArthur Park" (1978)	"Heaven Knows" (1978)	"Hot Stuff" (1979)

"Heaven Knows" is a song by American singer Donna Summer, featuring guest vocals from Brooklyn Dreams. Released as a single from Summer's Live and More album, where it appeared as part of the "MacArthur Park Suite", the song reached No. 4 on the US Billboard Hot 100 the week of March 17, 1979, holding that position for three weeks. It also reached No. 3 in Canada. It features the group Brooklyn Dreams with vocals by Joe "Bean" Esposito.

On the single version released by Summer (credited as Donna Summer with Brooklyn Dreams), Brooklyn Dreams singer Joe "Bean" Esposito sings second lead to Summer on the verses while Summer sings the chorus. However, on the version that appears on Brooklyn Dreams's 1979 album, Sleepless Nights, it is Esposito who sings the lead vocal on the verses with Summer singing second lead, and with Summer and the group provide backing vocals on the chorus. On the group's album, this version is credited as "Brooklyn Dreams with Donna Summer".

A 12" single of Summer's version, combined with "MacArthur Park (Reprise)" at 8 minutes and 26 seconds, was exclusively issued at the time in Mexico as the B-side to "Dim All the Lights". In 2010, the 12" version reappeared sans "MacArthur", at 6 minutes and 45 seconds, as a bonus track on a reissue of Sleepless Nights.

Cash Box said of Summers' single version that "Esposito has a deep shimmering voice while Donna reigns during soaring moments." Record World said that the song is "as polished as you'd expect."

== Chart performance ==
=== Weekly charts ===
Weekly chart performance for "Heaven Knows"
Chart (1979)	Peak position
Australia (Kent Music Report)	15
Canada Adult Contemporary (RPM)	2
Canada Dance/Urban (RPM)	20
Canada Top Singles (RPM)	3
New Zealand (Recorded Music NZ)	14
UK Singles (Official Charts)	34
US Adult Contemporary (Billboard)	17
US Dance Club Songs (Billboard) As part of "MacArthur Park Suite"	1
US Billboard Hot 100	4
US Hot R&B/Hip-Hop Songs (Billboard)	10
US Cash Box Top 100	4

=== Year-end charts ===
Year-end chart performance for "Heaven Knows"
Chart (1979)	Position
Australia (Kent Music Report)	96
Canada Top Singles (RPM)	43
US Billboard Hot 100	39
US Cash Box Top 100	38

== Certifications and sales ==
Certifications for "Heaven Knows"
Region	Certification	Certified units/sales
Canada (Music Canada)	Gold	75,000^{^}
United States (RIAA)	Gold	500,000^{^}
^{^} Shipments figures based on certification alone.
