= Bruce Sudano =

American musician (born 1948)

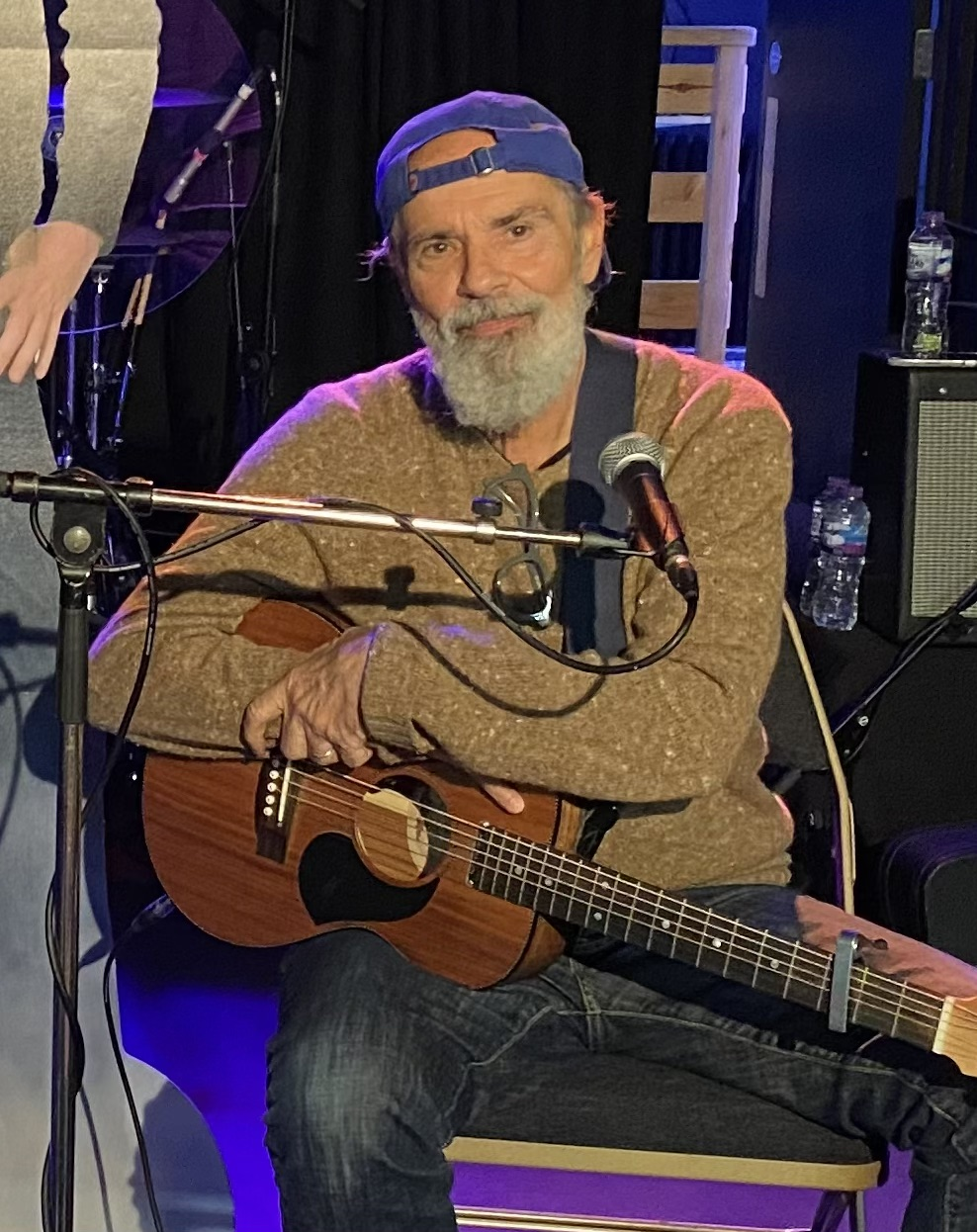
- Sudano in 2023

Background information
- Born: Bruce Charles Sudano; September 26, 1948 (age 78); New York City, U.S.
- Genres: Rhythm and blues; folk; soul; disco; smooth jazz
- Occupations: Musician; conductor; music producer; arranger; composer
- Instruments: Accordion; piano; vocals; guitar
- Years active: 1968–present
- Label: Purple Heart Recording Company
- Member of: The Candyman Band
- Formerly of: Silent Souls; Alive 'N Kickin'; Brooklyn Dreams
- Spouses: Donna Summer (m. 1980; died 2012) Francesca Repetto Kaufmann (m. 2020)
- Website: brucesudano.com

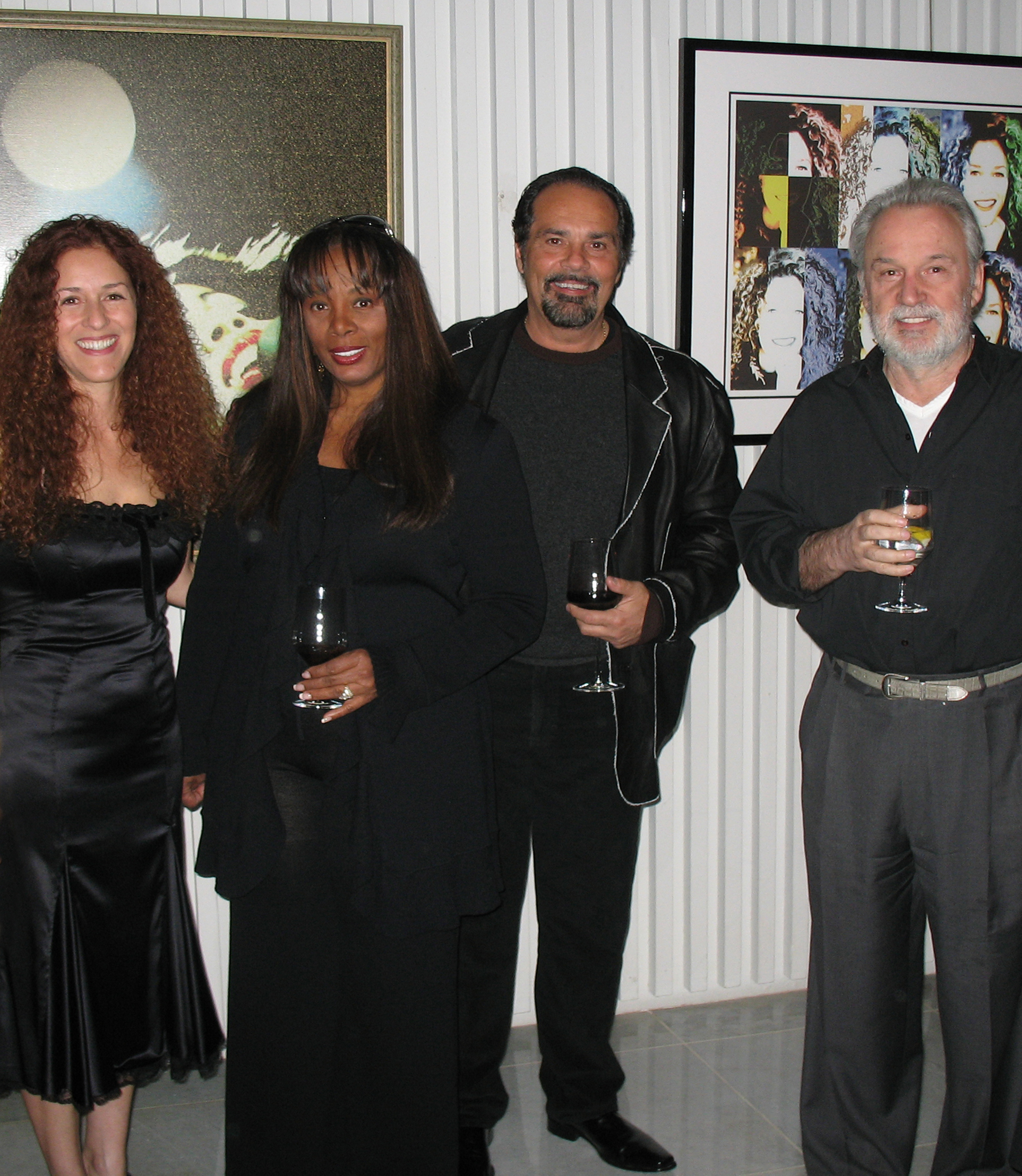
Bruce Sudano with Donna Summer to his left and composer Giorgio Moroder, whose wife, Francisca Gutierrez, is on the far left.

Bruce Charles Sudano (born September 26, 1948) is an American songwriter and musician. In the 1970s, he co-founded the bands Alive 'N Kickin' and Brooklyn Dreams, which each scored top-ten singles. He went on to write hit songs for artists such as Michael and Jermaine Jackson, Dolly Parton, Reba McEntire, and his wife, the Grammy Award-winning singer Donna Summer.

Sudano released his debut solo album, Fugitive Kind, in 1981. It wasn't until 2004 that he restarted his solo career with his second album, Rainy Day Soul, which scored three top-ten hits and earned him the New Music Weekly 2004 Adult Contemporary Artist of the Year award. He has subsequently released seven more albums.

Sudano is the founder of the indie record label Purple Heart Recording Company.

== Early life and education ==
Sudano was born in the Flatbush section of Brooklyn in New York City, to Margaret Alessio (1924–2012) and Louis Sudano (1923–2008). At the age of four, he began learning his first instrument, the accordion. He later taught himself to play piano and guitar. He soon developed a reputation in his neighborhood as a talented musician and got his first paid gig at the age of 12.

By the mid-1960s, Sudano was playing bass guitar in his first band, Silent Souls. He spent much of his time rehearsing and was soon playing live shows at popular nightclubs across the New York tri-state area, while earning his BA in theater at St. John's University.

== Career ==
=== 1968–1973: Alive 'N Kickin' and "Ball of Fire" ===
In 1968, Sudano, alongside Pepe Cardona, co-founded the pop rock band Alive 'N Kickin'. While they were playing a gig at Cheetah in New York City, Sudano met Tommy James of Tommy James and the Shondells and became his protégé, and the two began writing songs together at Allegro Studios. This relationship led to Sudano co-writing the song "Ball of Fire" for James's band, and in return, James co-wrote the track "Tighter, Tighter" for Alive 'N Kickin's self titled debut album. The song was released on Roulette Records in 1970 and went to no. 7 on the Billboard Hot 100.

Alive N Kickin' appeared on the television series American Bandstand and toured the United States, which included opening for Chicago and Frank Zappa. Sudano left the band in 1972 and moved to Los Angeles, where he began writing and performing as a solo artist. In 1973, he returned to Brooklyn, where he continued writing and performing but also began rehearsing and playing gigs with Joe "Bean" Esposito, Eddie Hokenson, and Louis Hokenson.

=== 1976–1980: Brooklyn Dreams and Donna Summer ===
In 1976, Sudano, Esposito, and Eddie Hokenson moved to Los Angeles and formed the band Brooklyn Dreams. The group signed a recording deal with Millennium Records in 1977. Sudano met Donna Summer in 1977. Brooklyn Dreams began writing songs with her, and they were hired to sing backing vocals on her song "I Remember Yesterday", from her studio album of the same name. Around this time, Sudano and Summer began dating.

In October 1977, Brooklyn Dreams released their self-titled debut album, which was produced by Skip Konte of Three Dog Night. The trio charted with the single "Music, Harmony and Rhythm", which they performed on American Bandstand.

In March 1978, Brooklyn Dreams appeared in the movie American Hot Wax, performing as the Planotones, a fictional group. That same year, Sudano and Esposito penned "Take It to the Zoo" alongside Summer for the Thank God It's Friday soundtrack. In late 1978, when Millennium Records changed their distribution to RCA, the Brooklyn Dreams contract was transferred to Casablanca Records.

=== 1979–1980: Bad Girls and Brooklyn Dreams breakup ===
Produced by Bob Esty, the second Brooklyn Dreams album, Sleepless Nights, was released in 1979, and included the track "Heaven Knows", a duet performed by Esposito and Summer and written by Summer, Giorgio Moroder, and Pete Bellotte. A second version of the song was recorded, with Summer and Esposito swapping their lead vocal parts, and released as a single credited to Summer featuring Brooklyn Dreams. The song peaked at no. 4 on the Billboard Hot 100 chart and became a certified million-selling Gold single in 1979. Later the same year, the band issued their third record, Joy Ride, produced by Jürgen Koppers, an engineer for Moroder.

Also in 1979, Brooklyn Dreams and Summer co-wrote the track "Bad Girls" for Summer's best-selling and most critically acclaimed album of the same name. The song went on to be a Billboard Hot 100 number-one hit for seven weeks and charted in the top ten in seven countries. On that same album, Sudano also co-wrote the songs "Lucky", "On My Honor", and "Can't Get to Sleep at Night".

In 1980, Brooklyn Dreams released their fourth and final album, Won't Let Go. They also wrote and recorded the song "Hollywood Knights" for that year's comedy film The Hollywood Knights. Brooklyn Dreams amicably disbanded in 1980. Sudano and Summer continued writing songs together and were married the same year. Sudano spent two decades managing Summer's career. They toured together, with Sudano playing keyboards and singing backing vocals.

=== Solo work ===
In 1980, Sudano married Donna Summer. Throughout the course of their 32-year marriage and partnership, Sudano intermittently performed different roles in Summer's career: songwriter, manager, producer, touring musician, and background singer.

Sudano co-wrote the song "Starting Over Again" with Summer in 1980, and after hearing Summer give an impromptu performance on The Tonight Show Starring Johnny Carson, Dolly Parton recorded and released the song on her 1980 album Dolly, Dolly, Dolly, and the single reached no. 1 on the U.S. country charts on May 24. Sudano recorded his own version of the song for his first solo record, Fugitive Kind, in 1981, after being signed to Millenium/RCA. "Starting Over Again" was re-recorded by Reba McEntire as the title track of her 1995 album, Starting Over.

Sudano co-wrote four songs on Summer's 1983 album, She Works Hard for the Money. In 1984, he wrote "Tell Me I'm Not Dreamin' (Too Good to Be True)" with Michael Omartian. Jermaine and Michael Jackson recorded the song as a duet for the album Jermaine Jackson. The track was nominated at the 1985 Grammy Awards for Best R&B Performance by a Duo or Group with Vocals. In 1988, it was covered by Robert Palmer. In 1986, he co-wrote "Closest Thing to Perfect", the title track for the John Travolta and Jamie Lee Curtis movie Perfect.

In 1987, Sudano collaborated with his former Brooklyn Dreams bandmate Joe "Bean" Esposito, on the album Joe Bruce & 2nd Avenue. He worked with singer Erin Cruise, producing and releasing four dance singles for her on his Purple Heart Recording Co. label. Sudano co-wrote "Are You Ready for Me" with Eddie Hokenson for the soundtrack to the 1991 film The Five Heartbeats and "Christmas Spirit" with Michael Omartian, which became the title track for Donna Summer's 1994 Christmas album. Between 1997 and 1999, Sudano wrote and co-wrote songs for Christian artists, including "That's the Way It's Meant to Be" for Point of Grace, "He Will Make a Way" and "A Different Road" for Kathy Troccoli, and "There Is a God" for Natalie Grant.

In 2004, Sudano released his second solo record, Rainy Day Soul, through Purple Heart, which scored three top-ten adult contemporary hits and earned him the New Music Weekly 2004 Adult Contemporary Artist of the Year award.

His third solo record, Life and the Romantic, was released in 2009 and won the New Music Weekly Adult Contemporary Song of the Year award for the track "It's Her Wedding Day", which Sudano wrote about his daughter Brooklyn's marriage. Footage from younger daughter Amanda's wedding to her Johnnyswim bandmate Abner Ramirez was included in the song's music video. Johnnyswim performed with Sudano on the track "Morning Song".

In 2014, after the death of Donna Summer, Sudano released the album With Angels on a Carousel. In 2015, he issued The Burbank Sessions with his newly formed Candyman Band. After a tour supporting his daughter Amanda's group, Johnnyswim, Sudano released 21st Century World in May 2017, produced by Hollis Brown frontman Mike Montali, a record that features the most culturally and politically charged songwriting of his career. In April 2018, Summer: The Donna Summer Musical opened on Broadway, with Sudano serving as an executive producer and story consultant.

In 2019, Sudano performed at the 30a Songwriters Festival in Florida and at the Philadelphia Folk Festival, and he supported the Zombies' lead singer Colin Blunstone on a UK tour, before heading into a two-year COVID lockdown. He spent that time writing and recording three EPs: Spirals, Vol. 1: Not a Straight Line to Be Found (2020), Spirals, Vol. 2: Time & the Space in Between (2020), and Ode to a Nightingale (2021).

In January 2023, Sudano released "Make the World Go Away", the first single from his album Talkin' Ugly Truth, Tellin' Pretty Lies, which came out in 2024. He has released a series of demo recordings as singles in 2025, including "Watching Darkness Fall" and "Damn Lonely on the Road".

== Personal life ==
Three years after their first meeting, Sudano and Donna Summer were married, on July 16, 1980. Sudano became the stepfather to Summer's daughter, Natalia Pia Melanie "Mimi" Sommer (born 1973), from her previous marriage, to Austrian actor Helmuth Sommer.

Sudano and Summer had two daughters together. The couple's first child, Brooklyn, named after the New York City borough Sudano is from, was born in 1981. Their second child, Amanda Grace, was born in 1982. The family settled on a 56-acre ranch in Thousand Oaks, California. In 1991, they moved to Connecticut and remained there for four years. In 1995, they relocated to Nashville, Tennessee, keeping a second home in Naples, Florida, and later buying a third home in Manhattan. On May 17, 2012, Donna Summer Sudano died from lung cancer. Following Summer's death, Sudano relocated to Los Angeles, and in 2020, he married the Italian art gallerist Francesca Repetto Kaufmann.

== Discography ==
Solo

- Fugitive Kind (1981)
- Rainy Day Soul (2004)
- Life and the Romantic (2009)
- With Angels on a Carousel (2014)
- The Burbank Sessions (2015)
- 21st Century World (2017)
- Spirals, Vol. 1: Not a Straight Line to Be Found (EP, 2020)
- Spirals, Vol. 2: Time & the Space in Between (EP, 2020)
- Ode to a Nightingale (EP, 2021)
- Talkin' Ugly Truth, Tellin' Pretty Lies (2024)
- Sketch Book (2026)

with Alive N Kickin'

- Alive N Kickin (1970)

with Brooklyn Dreams

- Brooklyn Dreams (1977)
- Sleepless Nights (1978)
- Joy Ride (1979)
- Won't Let Go (1980)
