= Brooklyn Dreams (group) =

American vocal group

- Origin: New York City, U.S.
- Genres: R&B, disco, dance
- Years active: 1977–1980
- Labels: Casablanca Records, Millennium Records
- Members: Joe "Bean" Esposito; Eddie Hokenson; Bruce Sudano

Brooklyn Dreams were an American singing group of the late 1970s, mixing R&B harmonies with contemporary dance/disco music and best known for a number of collaborations with singer Donna Summer. The band consisted of Joe "Bean" Esposito, Eddie Hokenson and Bruce Sudano. Esposito provided lead vocals for the band and played guitar, while Sudano played keyboards and Hokenson played drums and occasionally sang lead vocals.

== Biography ==
The group formed in the 1970s in the Brooklyn borough of New York City. Their biggest hit was the single "Heaven Knows", a single by Donna Summer, featuring Joe Esposito on second lead and the group singing backup. Released on Casablanca Records in January 1979, the single reached # 4 on the US Billboard Hot 100 chart. The band's version of the song appears on their 1979 album Sleepless Nights, but, on this version, Esposito is singing lead vocal and Summer is singing second lead, with the group again contributing backing vocals. This version is credited as Brooklyn Dreams with Donna Summer. It is one of the few recording scenarios where two acts duet on a song, and switch their vocal parts for the same exact song and production, and have both versions released simultaneously.

The band sang backup on other tracks from several Summer albums during this period.

Their self-titled debut album Brooklyn Dreams (1977) received positive reviews, comparing the group's harmonies to those of the Righteous Brothers. Singles "Sad Eyes" and the dance track "Music, Harmony and Rhythm" were modest hits. The latter song has been sampled over the years by various Hip hop artists. While the album was a modest hit, the group gained public awareness via an appearance, along with Kenny Vance of Jay and the Americans, as "Professor La Plano and the Planotones" in the 1978 film American Hot Wax.

Their sophomore effort Sleepless Nights (1979) was a greater commercial success for the group as it featured their musical collaboration with their label mate Summer. The group toured as opening act for Summer and also hosted The Midnight Special musical TV show and performing on the popular talk shows The Mike Douglas Show and The Merv Griffin Show, as well as Dick Clark's American Bandstand, Solid Gold and "Don Kirshner's Rock Concert". That year, the band co-wrote the song "Bad Girls" with Summer, and the single topped the US Billboard Hot 100, Hot Black Singles, and Hot Disco charts. Their own single "Make It Last", however, was not a major hit.

Their third album Joy Ride (1979) was a solid effort but moved them further away from their R&B roots. Produced by recording engineer Juergen Koppers, who also worked with Summer on occasion, it did not have the major support of Casablanca Records, which was having financial difficulties at the time. The album did not generate a chart single and had a much more Euro dance sound. Casabalanca (which distributed the band's label, Millennium Records) had changed direction by 1980 with the demise of Disco with which the label was closely related, and Casablanca's chairman Neil Bogart's departure.

"Won't Let Go" (1980) was the last album by the group which was moving away from the label's push to disco, and closer to an R&B/pop sound they originally intended to produce. By this time, members of the group were pursuing other projects separately or together, but not under the name Brooklyn Dreams.

"Deez Hollywood Knights", a track on Snoop Dogg's 2008 album Ego Trippin, samples the group's title track for the soundtrack for the 1980 film The Hollywood Knights.

=== Solo careers ===
Esposito went on to a solo career, with songs appearing on numerous movie soundtracks, notably Flashdance, The Karate Kid, and Coming To America for which he recorded a duet with singer Laura Branigan. He also released three solo albums "Solitary Man" with Giorgio Moroder, followed by "Joe, Bruce and 2nd Avenue" a collaboration with a former bandmate, and Treated and Released. In 2013, Esposito became the lead singer of The Brooklyn Bridge, formerly known as Johnny Maestro & The Brooklyn Bridge.

Sudano and Donna Summer later married. Sudano notably co-wrote the Dolly Parton hit "Starting Over Again", and a number of album tracks for Summer. Sudano released his first solo album, Fugitive Kind, for Millennium/RCA in 1981, which included his recording of "Starting Over Again". The song was recorded again in 1997 by Reba McEntire and was the title song of her CD. Sudano released his second solo album, Rainy Day Soul, 23 years later, in 2004. Sudano was voted AC artist of the year by New Music Weekly. Sudano's next CD, Life & the Romantic, was set to be released in March 2009.

== Discography ==
=== Albums ===
- Brooklyn Dreams (1977)
- Sleepless Nights (1979)
- Joy Ride (1979)
- Won't Let Go (1980)

=== Soundtracks ===
- American Hot Wax (1978)
- The Hollywood Knights (1980)
- Foxes (1980)

=== Charted singles ===
Year	Single	US BB	US CB	Album
1977	"Sad Eyes"	63	66	Brooklyn Dreams
1978	"Music, Harmony and Rhythm"	57	80	Brooklyn Dreams
1979	"Make it Last"	69	73	Sleepless Nights

== See also ==
- Alive N Kickin'
- The Mystics
