= The Donna Summer Anthology =

1993 compilation album by Donna Summer

Greatest hits album by Donna Summer
- Released: September 21, 1993
- Recorded: 1975–1993
- Genres: Pop, rock, dance, soul, reggae, disco
- Length: 156:35
- Label: PolyGram
- Producers: Giorgio Moroder, Pete Bellotte, Gary Klein, Quincy Jones, Michael Omartian, Harold Faltermeyer, Mike Stock, Matt Aitken, Pete Waterman, Keith Diamond

Donna Summer chronology
Mistaken Identity (1991)	The Donna Summer Anthology (1993)	Christmas Spirit (1994)

Professional ratings
Review scores
Source	Rating
AllMusic	4.5/5 stars
Robert Christgau	(**)
Select	2/5 medals

The Donna Summer Anthology is a double CD compilation album by the American singer Donna Summer, released by Polygram Records in 1993. The compilation featured the majority of Summer's best known songs right from the start of her success to the then present day. Summer had originally made her name during the disco era in the 1970s and in the decade that followed had experimented with different styles. Most of the tracks on this compilation are the original album versions of the songs, which were sometimes edited down for their release as a single. Included for the first time are two remixed tracks from her then unreleased album I'm a Rainbow, which had been recorded in 1981 but was shelved by her record company. The album also featured the Giorgio Moroder-penned and produced song "Carry On"', marking the first time Summer and Moroder had worked together since 1981. Summer and Moroder, together with Pete Bellotte had written the vast majority of her 1970s disco hits. Four years later, "Carry On" would be remixed and become a big dance hit. It also won Summer a Grammy for Best Dance Recording, her first win since 1984 and her fifth win in total.

Until 2016's three disc The Ultimate Collection (and later, 2020's Encore), this collection remained the closest to a traditional "box set" (usually three or four compact discs) of Summer's work because it contains then-unreleased material (selections from "I'm a Rainbow"), an unreleased (as a single) LP track ("Friends Unknown"), and the "MacArthur Park" promotional single.

== Track listing ==
Disc one

1. "Love to Love You Baby" (Original Single Version) (Bellotte, Moroder, Summer) – 3:21
2. "Could It Be Magic" (US Single Version) (Anderson, Manilow) – 3:54
3. "Try Me, I Know We Can Make It" (US Single Version) (Bellotte, Moroder, Summer) – 4:46
4. "Spring Affair" (US Single Version) (Bellotte, Moroder, Summer) – 4:02
5. "Love's Unkind" (Bellotte, Moroder, Summer) – 4:26
6. "I Feel Love" (Bellotte, Moroder, Summer) – 5:51
7. "Once Upon a Time" (Bellotte, Moroder, Summer) – 4:00
8. "Rumour Has It" (Bellotte, Moroder, Summer) – 4:54
9. "I Love You" (Bellotte, Moroder, Summer) – 4:41
10. "Last Dance" (1979 remix) (Jabara) – 4:57
11. "MacArthur Park" (Promotional 12" Mix) (Webb) – 6:25
12. "Heaven Knows" (Single Version) (with Brooklyn Dreams) (Bellotte, Mathieson, Moroder, Summer) – 3:52
13. "Hot Stuff" (12" Mix) (Bellotte, Faltermeyer, Forsey) – 6:46
14. "Bad Girls" (Esposito, Hokenson, Sudano, Summer) – 4:56
15. "Dim All the Lights" (Summer) – 4:23
16. "Sunset People" (Bellotte, Faltermeyer, Forsey) – 6:24

Disc two

1. "No More Tears (Enough Is Enough)" (Duet With Barbra Streisand) (Columbia Single Version) (Jabara, Roberts) – 4:41
2. "On the Radio" (Moroder, Summer) – 5:50
3. "The Wanderer" (Moroder, Summer) – 3:45
4. "Cold Love" (Bellotte, Faltermeyer, Forsey) – 3:38
5. "I'm a Rainbow" (Remix) (Sudano) – 4:04
6. "Don't Cry for Me, Argentina" (Remix) (Lloyd Webber, Rice) – 4:20
7. "Love Is in Control (Finger on the Trigger)" (Jones, Ross, Temperton) – 4:19
8. "State of Independence" (Anderson, Vangelis) – 5:49
9. "She Works Hard for the Money" (Omartian, Summer) – 5:18
10. "Unconditional Love" (Omartian, Summer) – 4:41
11. "There Goes My Baby" (Nelson, Patterson, Treadwell) – 4:06
12. "Supernatural Love" (Omartian, Sudano, Summer) 3:34
13. "All Systems Go" (Faltermeyer, Summer) – 4:10
14. "This Time I Know It's for Real" (Stock, Aitken, Waterman, Summer) – 3:36
15. "I Don't Wanna Get Hurt" (Stock, Aitken, Waterman) – 3:26
16. "When Love Cries" (Diamond, Henley, Nelson, Smith, Summer) – 5:14
17. "Friends Unknown" (Diamond, Smith, Smith, Summer) – 3:44
18. "Carry On" (Moroder, Waters)

== Gold ==
Gold

Greatest hits album by Donna Summer
- Released: January 11, 2005
- Length: 156:28
- Labels: Hip-O, Universal
- Producers: Giorgio Moroder; Pete Bellotte; John Barry; Gary Klein; Michael Omartian; Richard Perry; Mike Stock; Matt Aitken; Pete Waterman

Donna Summer chronology
The Journey: The Very Best of Donna Summer (2003)	Gold (2005)	Crayons (2008)

Professional ratings
Review scores
Source	Rating
AllMusic	4/5 stars

In 2005, Hip-O issued a modified and updated edition of the Anthology under their Gold compilation line, with noticeable differences to the cover art and track listing. As of August 10, 2006, the album sold 30,000 in United States, according to Nielsen Soundscan.

=== Track listing ===
All tracks written by Donna Summer, Pete Bellotte and Giorgio Moroder, except where noted.

Disc one

1. "Love to Love You Baby" [Long Single Version] – 4:58
2. "Could It Be Magic" [Single Version] (Adrienne Anderson, Barry Manilow) – 3:56
3. "Try Me, I Know We Can Make It" [Single Version] – 4:47
4. "Spring Affair" [Single Version] – 4:02
5. "Love's Unkind" – 4:26
6. "I Feel Love" – 5:52
7. "I Love You" – 4:42
8. "Last Dance" [On the Radio: Greatest Hits Volumes 1 & 2 Edit] (Paul Jabara) – 4:58
9. "MacArthur Park" [Promotional Single Version] (Jimmy Webb) – 6:28
10. "Heaven Knows" [Single Version] (Bellotte, Moroder, Summer) – 3:39
11. "Hot Stuff" [12" Single Version] (Bellotte, Harold Faltermeyer, Keith Forsey) – 6:46
12. "Bad Girls" (Joe "Bean" Esposito, Eddie Hokenson, Bruce Sudano, Summer) – 4:57
13. "Dim All the Lights" (Summer) – 4:36
14. "Sunset People" (Bellotte, Faltermeyer, Forsey) – 6:29
15. "No More Tears (Enough Is Enough)" duet with Barbra Streisand [Casablanca Single Edit] (Jabara, Bruce Roberts) – 4:48
16. "On the Radio" (Moroder, Summer) – 4:05

Notes

- Track 1 from Love to Love You Baby (1975, Casablanca)
- Tracks 2–3 from A Love Trilogy (1976, Casablanca)
- Track 4 from Four Seasons of Love (1976, Casablanca)
- Tracks 5–6 from I Remember Yesterday (1977, Casablanca)
- Track 7 from Once Upon a Time (1977, Casablanca)
- Track 8 from Thank God It's Friday soundtrack (1978, Casablanca)
- Tracks 9–10 from Live and More (1978, Casablanca)
- Tracks 11–14 from Bad Girls (1979, Casablanca)
- Tracks 15–16 from On the Radio: Greatest Hits Volumes 1 & 2 (1979, Casablanca)

Disc two

1. "The Wanderer" (Moroder, Summer) – 3:47
2. "Love Is in Control (Finger on the Trigger)" (Quincy Jones, Merria Ross, Rod Temperton) – 4:20
3. "State of Independence" (Jon Anderson, Vangelis) – 5:50
4. "She Works Hard for the Money" (Michael Omartian, Summer) – 5:21
5. "Unconditional Love" (Omartian, Summer) – 4:43
6. "There Goes My Baby" (Jerry Leiber, Ben Nelson, Lover Patterson, Mike Stoller, George Treadwell) – 4:07
7. "Supernatural Love" (Omartian, Sudano, Summer) – 3:35
8. "Dinner with Gershwin" (Brenda Russell) – 4:39
9. "All Systems Go" (Faltermeyer, Summer) – 4:13
10. "This Time I Know It's For Real" (Matt Aitken, Mike Stock, Summer, Pete Waterman) – 3:37
11. "I Don't Wanna Get Hurt" (Aitken, Stock, Waterman) – 3:27
12. "Love's About to Change My Heart" [7" Mix] (Aitken, Stock, Waterman) – 3:47
13. "When Love Cries" [7" Mix] (Keith Diamond, Larry Henley, Eve Nelson, Anthony Smith, Summer) – 4:31
14. "Carry On" featuring Giorgio Moroder (Moroder, Marietta Waters) – 3:41
15. "Melody of Love (Wanna Be Loved)" (Joe Carrano, Robert Clivillés, David Cole, Summer) – 4:15
16. "I Will Go with You (Con te partirò)" (Lucio Quarantotto, Francesco Sartori) – 4:09
17. "Dream-A-Lot's Theme (I Will Live For Love)" (DiGesare, Summer) – 4:52
18. "You're So Beautiful" (Tony Moran Edit) (DiGesare, Tony Moran, Summer) – 4:05

Notes

- Track 1 from The Wanderer (1980, Geffen)
- Tracks 2–3 from Donna Summer (1982, Geffen)
- Tracks 4–5 from She Works Hard for the Money (1983, Mercury)
- Tracks 6–7 from Cats Without Claws (1984, Geffen)
- Tracks 8–9 from All Systems Go (1987, Geffen)
- Tracks 10–11 and original version of track 12 from Another Place and Time (1989, Atlantic)
- Original version of track 13 from Mistaken Identity (1991, Atlantic)
- Track 14 from The Donna Summer Anthology (1993, Mercury)
- Track 15 from Endless Summer: Greatest Hits (1994, Mercury)
- Track 16 from Live & More Encore (1999, Epic)
- Tracks 17–18 from The Journey: The Very Best of Donna Summer (U.S. Edition) (2003, UTV)

== Charts and certifications ==
=== Anthology ===
==== Weekly charts ====
Chart (2012)	Peak position
Belgian Albums (Ultratop Flanders)	173
French Albums (SNEP)	9
Mexican Albums Chart	25

Single

Year	Single	Chart	Position
1998	"Carry On"	UK's single chart	65

==== Certifications and sales ====
Region	Certification	Certified units/sales
France (SNEP)	Gold	100,000^{*}
United States	—	219,000
^{*} Sales figures based on certification alone.

=== Gold ===
Chart (2005)	Position
Italian Albums (FIMI)	44

Chart (2026)	Position
Greek Albums (IFPI)	94

Region	Certification	Certified units/sales
United Kingdom (BPI)	Silver	60,000^{‡}
^{‡} Sales+streaming figures based on certification alone.
