= Singles... Driven by the Music =

Box set by Donna Summer
- Released: October 2, 2015
- Recorded: 1980–1991
- Genres: Pop rock; soul; new wave
- Label: Driven by the Music
- Producers: Giorgio Moroder; Pete Bellotte; Quincy Jones; Michael Omartian; Richard Perry; Harold Faltermeyer; Peter Bunetta; Rick Chudacoff; Stock Aitken Waterman; Keith Diamond

Donna Summer chronology
Hits, Singles & More (2014)	Singles... Driven by the Music (2015)	The Ultimate Collection (2016)

Professional ratings
Review scores
Source	Rating
Attitude	4/5 stars
Record Collector	3/5 stars

Singles... Driven by the Music is a box set by American singer Donna Summer, released on October 2, 2015, by Driven by the Music.

== Overview ==
The compilation features singles released by Geffen and Atlantic Records from the albums The Wanderer (1980), Donna Summer (1982), Cats Without Claws (1984), All Systems Go (1987), Another Place and Time (1989), and Mistaken Identity (1991). Each disc was designed as a vinyl copy of a specific single. The box set also includes new notes by journalist Christian John Wikane, which contain brand new interviews with musicians such as Bruce Sudano, Matt Aitken, Jellybean Benitez, Harold Faltermeyer, Pete Hammond, Ray Parker Jr., Martyn Ware and Pete Waterman.

== Track listing ==
The Wanderer
1-1. "The Wanderer" — 3:46
1-2. "Stop Me" — 3:44

Cold Love
2-1. "Cold Love" (Edit) – 3:16
2-2. "Grand Illusion" — 3:53
2-3. "Cold Love" — 3:38

Who Do You Think You're Foolin'
3-1. "Who Do You Think You're Foolin'" (Edit) – 3:59
3-2. "Running for Cover" — 3:48

Looking Up
4-1. "Looking Up" — 3:57
4-2. "Who Do You Think You're Foolin'" — 4:18

Love Is In Control (Finger on The Trigger)
5-1. "Love Is in Control (Finger on the Trigger)" (7" Version) – 3:42
5-2. "Sometimes Like Butterflies" — 4:28
5-3. "Love Is In Control (Finger on the Trigger)" (Dance Remix) – 7:07
5-4. "Love Is In Control (Finger on the Trigger)" (Instrumental featuring Ernie Watts on Saxophone Solo) – 7:04

State of Independence
6-1. "State of Independence" (7" Version) – 4:25
6-2. "Love Is Just a Breath Away" — 3:54
6-3. "State of Independence" — 5:50

The Woman in Me
7-1. "The Woman in Me" — 3:54
7-2. "Livin' in America" — 4:42
7-3. "The Wanderer" — 3:46

Protection
8-1. "Protection" — 3:35
8-2. "(If It) Hurts Just a Little" — 3:53
8-3. "State of Independence" — 5:50

There Goes My Baby
9-1. "There Goes My Baby" — 4:06
9-2. "Maybe It's Over" — 4:42
9-3. "Face the Music" — 4:15

Supernatural Love
10-1. "Supernatural Love" (Remix) – 3:38
10-2. "Face the Music" — 4:15
10-3. "Supernatural Love" (Extended Dance Remix) – 6:11
10-4. "Suzanna" — 4:29

Eyes
11-1. "Eyes" (7" Remix Edit) – 3:47
11-2. "It's Not the Way" — 4:22
11-3. "Eyes" (Extended Mix) – 6:58
11-4. "I'm Free (Extended Mix)" — 6:20

Dinner with Gershwin
12-1. "Dinner with Gershwin" (Edit) – 4:10
12-2. "Dinner with Gershwin" (Instrumental) – 4:55
12-3. "Dinner with Gershwin" (Extended Version) – 7:45
12-4. "Dinner with Gershwin" (LP Version) – 4:38
12-5. "Tearin' Down the Walls" — 3:57

All Systems Go
13-1. "All Systems Go" (Edit) – 3:59
13-2. "Bad Reputation" — 4:14
13-3. "All Systems Go" (Extended Remix) – 7:55

Only the Fool Survives
14-1. "Only the Fool Survives" (Edit) – 4:02
14-2. "Love Shock" — 4:16

This Time I Know It's for Real
15-1. "This Time I Know It's for Real" — 3:36
15-2. "Whatever Your Heart Desires" — 3:52
15-3. "This Time I Know It's for Real (Extended Version)" — 7:21
15-4. "This Time I Know It's for Real (Instrumental)" — 3:34
15-5. "Interview" — 28:52

I Don't Wanna Get Hurt
16-1. "I Don't Wanna Get Hurt" (7" Remix) – 3:32
16-2. "I Don't Wanna Get Hurt" (Instrumental) – 4:46
16-3. "I Don't Wanna Get Hurt" (Extended Version) – 6:59
16-4. "Dinner with Gershwin" — 4:38

Love's About to Change My Heart
17-1. "Love's About to Change My Heart" (PWL 7" Mix) – 3:47
17-2. "Love's About to Change My Heart" (Extended Remix) – 6:19
17-3. "Love's About to Change My Heart" (Instrumental) – 5:13
17-4. "Jeremy" — 4:36
17-5. "Love's About to Change My Heart" (Clivillés & Cole 12" Mix) – 7:47
17-6. "Love's About to Change My Heart" (Dub 2) – 7:13
17-7. "Love's About to Change My Heart" (Clivillés & Cole 7" Mix) – 4:21

When Love Takes Over You
18-1. "When Love Takes Over You" (Remix) – 3:37
18-2. "Bad Reputation" — 4:14
18-3. "When Love Takes Over You" (Extended Remix) – 6:13
18-4. "When Love Takes Over You" (Instrumental) – 3:35

Breakaway
19-1. "Breakaway" (Power Radio Mix) – 4:04
19-2. "Love Is in Control (Finger on the Trigger)" — 4:19
19-3. "Breakaway" (Remix — Full Version) – 6:44
19-4. "Breakaway" (Remix — Edit) – 3:34
19-5. "Breakaway" (Extended Power Mix) – 6:09

State of Independence (1990 Remixes)
20-1. "State of Independence" (New Bass Edit) – 4:10
20-2. "State of Independence" (New Bass Mix) – 5:58
20-3. "State of Independence" (No Drum Mix) – 5:46
20-4. "State of Independence" (N.R.G. Mix) – 5:34
20-5. "State of Independence" (7" Version) – 4:25
20-6. "Love Is Just a Breath Away" — 3:54

When Love Cries
21-1. "When Love Cries" (Radio Remix) – 4:10
21-2. "When Love Cries" (12" Club Mix) – 6:56
21-3. "What Is It You Want" — 4:42

Work That Magic
22-1. "Work That Magic" (ISA Full Length Remix) – 4:57
22-2. "Let There Be Peace" — 3:58
22-3. "Work That Magic" (Extended ISA Remix) – 6:17
22-4. "Work That Magic" (Capricorn ISA Remix) – 4:26
22-5. "This Time I Know It's for Real" — 3:36
22-6. "Dinner with Gershwin" — 4:38
22-7. "State of Independence" — 5:50

State of Independence (1996 Remixes)
23-1. "State of Independence" (New Radio Millennium Mix) – 5:00
23-2. "State of Independence" (Creation Mix) – 4:19
23-3. "State of Independence" (Original Album Version) – 5:50
23-4. "State of Independence" (DJ Dero Vocal Mix) – 8:19
23-5. "State of Independence" (Murk Club Mix) – 8:22
23-6. "State of Independence" (Jules & Skin Vocal Mix) – 6:24
23-7. "State of Independence" (Murk-A-Dub Dub) – 6:21
23-8. "State of Independence" (Cuba Libre Mix) – 6:31
23-9. "State of Independence" (Jules & Skin Dub Remix) – 6:24

Bonus Unreleased Mixes
24-1. "This Time I Know It's for Real" (Hot Tracks Mix — Mix 1) – 7:17
24-2. "Whatever Your Heart Desires" (Hot Tracks Mix) – 6:12
24-3. "If It Makes You Feel Good" (Hot Tracks Mix) – 6:37
24-4. "Love's About To Change My Heart" (Hot Tracks Mix) – 5:17
24-5. "Work That Magic" (Hot Tracks Mix) – 6:18
24-6. "Highway Runner" (Disconet Mix) – 5:52
