= The Ultimate Collection (2016 Donna Summer album) =

Compilation album by Donna Summer
- Released: November 18, 2016
- Recorded: 1968–2012
- Genre: Pop, rock, disco, R&B
- Length: 78:10
- Label: Driven By The Music

Donna Summer chronology
Singles... Driven by the Music (2015)	The Ultimate Collection (2016)	Summer: The Original Hits (2018)

Professional ratings
Review scores
Source	Rating
AllMusic	4/5 stars
Attitude	5/5 stars

The Ultimate Collection is a greatest hits compilation of recordings by American singer Donna Summer released in the United Kingdom in late 2016. The album was certified Silver in the UK.

== Reception ==
Andy Kellman of AllMusic is one of the new people to review the compilation, giving it 4 stars and saying it "adequately rounds up Summer's biggest hits in non-chronological sequence."

== Track listings ==
Unless listed otherwise, all tracks are presented in their 7"/single edited form.

=== Standard edition ===
1. "I Feel Love" [Album Version] (Bellotte, Moroder, Summer) - 5:57
2. "MacArthur Park" (Webb) - 3:58
3. "This Time I Know It's For Real" (Aitken, Stock, Summer, Waterman) - 3:37
4. "Hot Stuff" (Bellotte, Faltermeyer, Forsey) - 3:51
5. "Dinner with Gershwin" (Russell) - 4:11
6. "I Remember Yesterday" (Bellotte, Moroder, Summer) - 4:47
7. "Bad Girls" (Esposito, Hokenson, Sudano, Summer) - 3:56
8. "State of Independence" (Anderson, Vangelis) - 4:25
9. "She Works Hard for the Money" (Omartian, Summer) - 4:33
10. "On The Radio" (Moroder, Summer) - 4:07
11. "Last Dance" (Jabara) - 3:18
12. "No More Tears (Enough Is Enough)" (Duet With Barbra Streisand) (Jabara, Roberts) - 4:49
13. "Love's Unkind" [Album Version] (Bellotte, Moroder, Summer) - 4:28
14. "Love to Love You Baby" (Bellotte, Moroder, Donna Summer) – 3:20
15. "Theme From The Deep (Down Deep Inside)" (Barry, Summer) - 4:24
16. "I Love You" (Bellotte, Moroder, Summer) - 3:20
17. "Love Is in Control (Finger on the Trigger)" (Jones, Ross, Temperton) - 3:44
18. "I Don't Wanna Get Hurt" [7" Remix] (Aitken, Stock, Waterman) - 3:34
19. "Love's About To Change My Heart" [PWL 7" Mix] (Aitken, Stock, Waterman) - 3:34

=== Double LP edition ===
- A1. "I Feel Love" [Album Version] - 5:57
- A2. "MacArthur Park" - 3:58
- A3. "This Time I Know It's For Real" - 3:37
- A4. "Hot Stuff" - 3:51
- A5. "Dinner with Gershwin" - 4:11
- B1. "I Remember Yesterday" - 4:47
- B2. "Bad Girls" - 3:56
- B3. "On The Radio" - 4:07
- B4. "Heaven Knows" (featuring Brooklyn Dreams) (Bellotte, Mathieson, Moroder, Summer) - 3:54
- B5. "Last Dance"- 3:18
- C1. "No More Tears (Enough Is Enough)" [Duet With Barbra Streisand] - 4:49
- C2. "Love's Unkind" [Album Version] - 4:28
- C3. "Love to Love You Baby" – 3:20
- C4. "Theme From The Deep (Down Deep Inside)" - 4:24
- C5. "Could It Be Magic" (Anderson, Manilow) – 3:56
- D1. "I Love You" - 3:20
- D2. "Rumour Has It" (Bellotte, Moroder, Summer) - 3:51
- D3. "Love Is in Control (Finger on the Trigger)" - 3:44
- D4. "I Don't Wanna Get Hurt" [7" Remix] - 3:34
- D5. "Love's About To Change My Heart" [PWL 7" Mix] - 3:34

=== Deluxe Collector's Edition ===
Disc 1 - To Dance

1. "I Feel Love" [Album Version] - 5:57
2. "MacArthur Park" - 3:58
3. "This Time I Know It's For Real" - 3:37
4. "Hot Stuff" - 3:51
5. "Dinner with Gershwin" - 4:11
6. "Bad Girls" - 3:56
7. "State of Independence" - 4:25
8. "Rumour Has It" - 3:51
9. "The Wanderer" - 3:45
10. "She Works Hard for the Money" - 4:33
11. "All Systems Go" (Faltermeyer, Summer) - 4:00
12. "On The Radio" - 4:07
13. "Heaven Knows" (featuring Brooklyn Dreams) - 3:54
14. "Sunset People" (Bellotte, Faltermeyer, Forsey) - 3:58
15. "Eyes" [Jellybean Remix Edit] (Summer, Michael Omartian) - 3:58
16. "Power Of Love" [Hani's Mixshow Edit] (Luther Vandross, Marcus Miller, Teddy Vann) - 5:45
17. "I'm a Fire" [Solitaire Club Mix] (Toby Gad, Summer) - 7:09
18. "Last Dance" - 3:18

Disc 2 - To Love

1. "No More Tears (Enough Is Enough)" [Duet With Barbra Streisand] - 4:49
2. "Love's Unkind" [Album Version] - 4:28
3. "Love to Love You Baby" – 3:20
4. "Theme From The Deep (Down Deep Inside)" - 4:24
5. "Could It Be Magic" – 3:56
6. "Try Me, I Know We Can Make It" (Bellotte, Moroder, Summer) - 4:46
7. "Spring Affair" (Bellotte, Moroder, Summer) - 4:02
8. "I Love You" - 3:20
9. "Unconditional Love" [with Musical Youth] (Omartian, Summer) - 3:58
10. "Love Is in Control (Finger on the Trigger)" - 3:44
11. "I Don't Wanna Get Hurt" [7" Remix] - 3:34
12. "When Love Takes Over You" [Remix] - 3:38
13. "Breakaway" [Power Radio Mix] - 3:59
14. "Melody of Love (Wanna Be Loved)" (Album Version - mislabeled as "West End 7" Radio Mix") (Carrano, Clivilles, Cole, Summer) - 4:17
15. "Winter Melody" (Bellotte, Moroder, Summer) - 4:04
16. "The Woman in Me" (John Bettis, Michael Clark) – 3:55
17. "Back in Love Again" (Bellotte, Moroder, Summer) - 3:58
18. "Dim All the Lights" (Summer) - 4:23
19. "Cold Love" - 3:18
20. "Love's About To Change My Heart" [PWL 7" Mix] - 3:34

Disc 3 - To Remember

1. "I Remember Yesterday" [Album Version] (Bellotte, Moroder, Summer) - 4:47
2. "Wassermann (Aquarius)" - 3:12
3. "Oh, Segne Gott Mein' Seel / Bless The Lord" (From German Cast Recording Of 'Godspell') - 2:45
4. "Lady of the Night" (Bellotte, Moroder) - 3:58
5. "The Hostage" - (Pete Bellotte, Giorgio Moroder) - 4:16
6. "Something's Missing (In My Life)" - 5:41 (credited as "Paul Jabara featuring Special Guest Donna Summer")
7. "Once Upon A Time" - 4:17
8. "Shut Out" - 3:12 (credited as "Paul Jabara featuring Special Guest Donna Summer")
9. "Walk Away" - 4:31
10. "Never Lose Your Sense Of Humor" - 3:30 (credited as "Paul Jabara featuring Special Guest Donna Summer")
11. "Highway Runner" (Moroder, Summer) - 3:28
12. "I Feel Love" [Part 1 - Special Version Remix By Patrick Cowley] - 3:47
13. "Romeo" (Bellotte, Levay) - 3:18
14. "When Love Cries" [Radio Remix] (Keith Diamond, Larry Henley, Eve Nelson, Anthony Smith, Summer) - 4:09
15. "I Will Go with You (Con te partirò)" (Quarantotto, Sartori, Summer) - 4:04
16. "Love Is the Healer" (Eric Kupper's I Feel Healed 7" Mix) - 3:58
17. "I Got Your Love" [Radio Edit] (Summer, Roberts) - 3:58
18. "Stamp Your Feet" [Jason Nevins Radio Mix] - 3:46
19. "Fame (The Game)" [Dave Aude Radio] - 3:48
20. "To Paris with Love" [Mendy Radio Edit] - 4:00

== Charts ==
Chart performance for The Ultimate Collection
Chart (2016)	Peak position
UK Albums (OCC)	30

== Certifications and sales ==
Certifications for The Ultimate Collection
Region	Certification	Certified units/sales
United Kingdom (BPI)	Silver	60,000^{‡}
^{‡} Sales+streaming figures based on certification alone.
