= Endless Summer: Donna Summer's Greatest Hits =

Greatest hits album by Donna Summer
- Released: November 8, 1994
- Genres: Pop; dance; soul; R&B; disco; rock
- Length: 71:26
- Label: Mercury/PolyGram
- Producers: Giorgio Moroder; Pete Bellotte; Gary Klein; Quincy Jones; Michael Omartian; Mike Stock; Matt Aitken; Pete Waterman; Donna Summer

Donna Summer chronology
Christmas Spirit (1994)	Endless Summer: Donna Summer's Greatest Hits (1994)	Live & More Encore (1999)

Singles from Endless Summer: Donna Summer's Greatest Hits
- 1. "Melody of Love (Wanna Be Loved)" Released: October 31, 1994; 2. "Any Way at All" Released: 1994 (US only)

Alternative cover
- France release

Professional ratings
Review scores
Source	Rating
AllMusic	5/5 stars
Cash Box	(favorable)
Robert Christgau	A

Endless Summer: Donna Summer's Greatest Hits is a compilation album by American singer-songwriter Donna Summer, released on November 8, 1994. It contains many of Summer's best known songs, from her 1970s breakthrough to the release of the album. Unlike 1993's The Donna Summer Anthology, which contains the majority of the songs in their original longer forms, Endless Summer generally includes single versions of the songs. However, the version sold in the United Kingdom uses the album version of the track "I Don't Wanna Get Hurt", (from Another Place and Time), not the more club-oriented mix released as a single there.

Endless Summer also features two new tracks, the first of which, "Melody of Love (Wanna Be Loved)", became a moderate hit when released as a single, reaching number one on the US dance charts. Summer was given production credits on the track, which she had written with Robert Clivillés and David Cole of C+C Music Factory. The other new track and second single was the soulful ballad "Any Way at All", which Summer had written with her husband Bruce Sudano. This song was produced by Michael Omartian, who had produced some of Summer's work in the 1980s.

For many years, Endless Summer was regarded as the "definitive" Donna Summer hits CD, as it was the last international non-budget compilation of her's to be released until The Journey: The Very Best of Donna Summer was released in 2003. A video album with music videos and some live performances was also released simultaneously, in VHS and LD format.

== Track listings ==
The track listing of Endless Summer varied from nation to nation as some of Summer's hits were more popular in certain places than others. For example, "Heaven Knows" and "The Wanderer", big hits in the US, are not featured on the European edition of the album and are replaced with a couple of her 1980s hits that were less successful in the US. In France, however, the compilation was not released until the following year and contains the 1995 remix of her 1977 hit "I Feel Love" as a bonus track.

=== North American / Australasian / Japanese edition ===
No.	Title	Writer(s)	Producer(s)	Length
1.	"Melody of Love (Wanna Be Loved)"	Joe Carrano, Robert Clivillés, David Cole, Donna Summer	D. Summer, Welcome Productions	4:16
2.	"Love to Love You Baby"	Pete Bellotte, Giorgio Moroder, D. Summer	P. Bellotte	3:21
3.	"Could It Be Magic"	Adrienne Anderson, Barry Manilow	G. Moroder, P. Bellotte	3:55
4.	"I Feel Love"	G. Moroder, P. Bellotte	G. Moroder, P. Bellotte	3:46
5.	"Last Dance"	Paul Jabara	G. Moroder, P. Bellotte	3:18
6.	"MacArthur Park"	Jimmy Webb	G. Moroder, P. Bellotte	3:55
7.	"Heaven Knows"	P. Bellotte, Greg Mathieson, G. Moroder, D. Summer	G. Moroder, P. Bellotte	3:22
8.	"Hot Stuff"	P. Bellotte, Harold Faltermeyer, Keith Forsey	G. Moroder, P. Bellotte	3:50
9.	"Bad Girls"	Joe Esposito, Eddie Hokenson, Bruce Sudano, D. Summer	G. Moroder, P. Bellotte	3:54
10.	"Dim All the Lights"	D. Summer	G. Moroder, P. Bellotte	4:04
11.	"No More Tears (Enough Is Enough)" (featuring Barbra Streisand)	P. Jabara, Bruce Roberts	Gary Klein	4:48
12.	"On the Radio"	G. Moroder, D. Summer	G. Moroder	4:03
13.	"The Wanderer"	G. Moroder, D. Summer	G. Moroder, P. Bellotte	3:45
14.	"Love Is in Control (Finger on the Trigger)"	Quincy Jones, Merria Ross, Rod Temperton	Q. Jones	4:19
15.	"State of Independence"	Jon Anderson, Vangelis	Q. Jones	4:25
16.	"She Works Hard for the Money"	Michael Omartian, D. Summer	M. Omartian	4:33
17.	"This Time I Know It's for Real"	Matt Aitken, Mike Stock, D. Summer, Pete Waterman	M. Aitken, M. Stock, P. Waterman	3:36
18.	"Any Way at All"	Eric Silver, B. Sudano, D. Summer	M. Omartian	4:16
Total length:				71:26

=== European edition (excluding France) ===
No.	Title	Writer(s)	Producer(s)	Length
1.	"Melody of Love (Wanna Be Loved)"	Joe Carrano, Robert Clivillés, David Cole, Donna Summer	D. Summer, Welcome Productions	4:16
2.	"Love to Love You Baby"	Pete Bellotte, Giorgio Moroder, D. Summer	P. Bellotte	3:21
3.	"Could It Be Magic"	Adrienne Anderson, Barry Manilow	G. Moroder, P. Bellotte	3:55
4.	"I Feel Love"	G. Moroder, P. Bellotte	G. Moroder, P. Bellotte	3:46
5.	"Love's Unkind"	P. Bellotte, G. Moroder, D. Summer	G. Moroder, P. Bellotte	4:26
6.	"I Love You"	P. Bellote, G. Moroder, D. Summer	G. Moroder, P. Bellotte	3:19
7.	"Last Dance"	Paul Jabara	G. Moroder, P. Bellotte	3:18
8.	"MacArthur Park"	Jimmy Webb	G. Moroder, P. Bellotte	3:55
9.	"Hot Stuff"	P. Bellotte, Harold Faltermeyer, Keith Forsey	G. Moroder, P. Bellotte	3:50
10.	"Bad Girls"	Joe Esposito, Eddie Hokenson, Bruce Sudano, D. Summer	G. Moroder, P. Bellotte	3:54
11.	"No More Tears (Enough Is Enough)" (featuring Barbra Streisand)	P. Jabara, Bruce Roberts	Gary Klein	4:48
12.	"On the Radio"	G. Moroder, D. Summer	G. Moroder	4:03
13.	"Love Is in Control (Finger on the Trigger)"	Quincy Jones, Merria Ross, Rod Temperton	Q. Jones	4:19
14.	"State of Independence"	Jon Anderson, Vangelis	Q. Jones	4:25
15.	"She Works Hard for the Money"	Michael Omartian, D. Summer	M. Omartian	4:33
16.	"Unconditional Love"	M. Omartian, D. Summer	M. Omartian	3:57
17.	"This Time I Know It's for Real"	Matt Aitken, Mike Stock, D. Summer, Pete Waterman	M. Aitken, M. Stock, P. Waterman	3:36
18.	"I Don't Wanna Get Hurt"	M. Aitken, M. Stock, P. Waterman	M. Aitken, M. Stock, P. Waterman	3:26
19.	"Any Way at All"	Eric Silver, B. Sudano, D. Summer	M. Omartian	4:16
Total length:				75:23

=== France edition (Greatest Hits) ===
No.	Title	Writer(s)	Producer(s)	Length
1.	"I Feel Love ('95 Remix)"	Giorgio Moroder, Pete Bellotte	Rollo, Sister Bliss	3:50
2.	"Love to Love You Baby"	P. Bellotte, G. Moroder, Donna Summer	P. Bellotte	3:21
3.	"Could It Be Magic"	Adrienne Anderson, Barry Manilow	G. Moroder, P. Bellotte	3:55
4.	"Love's Unkind"	P. Bellotte, G. Moroder, D. Summer	G. Moroder, P. Bellotte	4:26
5.	"I Love You"	P. Bellote, G. Moroder, D. Summer	G. Moroder, P. Bellotte	3:19
6.	"Last Dance"	Paul Jabara	G. Moroder, P. Bellotte	3:18
7.	"MacArthur Park"	Jimmy Webb	G. Moroder, P. Bellotte	3:55
8.	"Hot Stuff"	P. Bellotte, Harold Faltermeyer, Keith Forsey	G. Moroder, P. Bellotte	3:50
9.	"Bad Girls"	Joe Esposito, Eddie Hokenson, Bruce Sudano, D. Summer	G. Moroder, P. Bellotte	3:54
10.	"No More Tears (Enough Is Enough)" (featuring Barbra Streisand)	P. Jabara, Bruce Roberts	Gary Klein	4:48
11.	"On the Radio"	G. Moroder, D. Summer	G. Moroder	4:03
12.	"Love Is in Control (Finger on the Trigger)"	Quincy Jones, Merria Ross, Rod Temperton	Q. Jones	4:19
13.	"State of Independence"	Jon Anderson, Vangelis	Q. Jones	4:25
14.	"She Works Hard for the Money"	Michael Omartian, D. Summer	M. Omartian	4:33
15.	"Unconditional Love"	M. Omartian, D. Summer	M. Omartian	3:57
16.	"This Time I Know It's for Real"	Matt Aitken, Mike Stock, D. Summer, Pete Waterman	M. Aitken, M. Stock, P. Waterman	3:36
17.	"I Don't Wanna Get Hurt"	M. Aitken, M. Stock, P. Waterman	M. Aitken, M. Stock, P. Waterman	3:26
18.	"I Feel Love"	G. Moroder, P. Bellotte	G. Moroder, P. Bellotte	3:46
Total length:				70:41

== Charts and certifications ==
=== Weekly charts ===
Chart (1994-1995)	Position
Australian Albums (ARIA)	93
Dutch Albums (Album Top 100)	75
French Albums (SNEP)	5
Italian Albums (FIMI)	84
New Zealand Albums (RMNZ)	10
UK Albums (Official Charts)	37
US Billboard 200	90

Chart (2012)	Position
French Albums (SNEP)	166

Single

Year	Single	Chart	Position
1994	"Melody of Love (Wanna Be Loved)"	United Kingdom	21

=== Certifications and sales ===
Region	Certification	Certified units/sales
France (SNEP)	Gold	100,000^{*}
United Kingdom (BPI)	Gold	100,000^{^}
United States	—	469,000
^{*} Sales figures based on certification alone.^{^} Shipments figures based on certification alone.
