= The Journey: The Very Best of Donna Summer =

Greatest hits album by Donna Summer
- Released: September 30, 2003
- Length: 78:53
- Label: UTV
- Producers: Giorgio Moroder; Pete Bellotte; John Barry; Gary Klein; Michael Omartian; Richard Perry; Mike Stock; Matt Aitken; Pete Waterman

Donna Summer chronology
The Ultimate Collection (2003)	The Journey: The Very Best of Donna Summer (2003)	Gold (2005)

Professional ratings
Review scores
Source	Rating
AllMusic	4/5 stars

The Journey: The Very Best of Donna Summer is a compilation album by American singer Donna Summer released by Universal Music on September 30, 2003. It features most of Summer's best known songs from the 1970s disco era, during which she became the most successful female of that genre, plus some of her hits from the 1980s, during which time she experimented with different genres.

The Journey was first released in the US on the back of her autobiography Ordinary Girl: The Journey, which was later released a week after the album. The album was also released internationally in 2004 on the back of her appearance on the TV special Disco Mania, which celebrated the 1970s disco era, and saw Summer performing her 1979 duet "No More Tears (Enough Is Enough)" (originally with Barbra Streisand) with Irish boy band Westlife.

Three new songs were recorded for the collection, including "You're So Beautiful" and "Dream-A-Lot's Theme (I Will Live for Love)", both of which were released as promotional singles. The international version of the compilation placed the two new recordings "That's the Way" and "Dream-A-Lot's Theme" on the limited edition bonus disc, these two tracks are consequently not available on the international single-disc edition of The Journey, which has a slightly different track listing than the US edition, both on the album itself and also on the 'limited edition bonus disc'.

== Track listings ==
International edition
No.	Title	Writer(s)	Length
1.	"Love to Love You Baby"	Summer, Moroder, Bellotte	3:22
2.	"Could It Be Magic"	Anderson, Manilow	3:54
3.	"I Feel Love"	Summer, Moroder, Bellotte	3:46
4.	"Down Deep Inside (Theme From "The Deep")"	Barry, Summer	4:25
5.	"Love's Unkind"	Bellotte, Moroder, Summer	4:28
6.	"I Love You"	Summer, Moroder, Bellotte	3:18
7.	"Last Dance"	Jabara	3:19
8.	"MacArthur Park"	Webb	3:54
9.	"Heaven Knows"	Summer, Moroder, Mathieson, Bellotte	3:39
10.	"Rumour Has It"	Bellotte, Moroder, Summer	5:04
11.	"Hot Stuff"	Faltermeyer, Forsey, Bellotte	3:50
12.	"Bad Girls"	Sudano, Summer, Hokenson, Esposito	3:57
13.	"No More Tears (Enough Is Enough)" (Duet With Barbra Streisand)	Roberts, Jabara	4:48
14.	"On the Radio"	Summer, Moroder	4:05
15.	"Love Is in Control (Finger on the Trigger)"	Ross, Jones, Temperton	4:19
16.	"State of Independence"	Anderson, Vangelis	4:25
17.	"She Works Hard for the Money"	Summer, Omartian	4:10
18.	"Dinner with Gershwin"	Russell	4:39
19.	"This Time I Know It's for Real"	Summer, Stock, Aitken, Waterman	3:36
Total length:			76:58

International limited edition bonus disc
No.	Title	Writer(s)	Length
1.	"Love to Love You Baby" (Original Album Version)		16:51
2.	"I Feel Love" (Patrick Cowley Mix)		15:53
3.	"Hot Stuff" (Original 12" Version)		6:46
4.	"No More Tears (Enough Is Enough)" (Duet With Barbra Streisand) (Original 12" Version)		11:46
5.	"On the Radio" (Original 12"/Foxes soundtrack version)		7:34
6.	"Melody of Love (Wanna Be Loved)" (Morales Classic Club Mix)	Cole, Summer, Carrano, Clivilles	8:04
7.	"That's the Way" (new recording)	Moroder, Forsey	3:45
8.	"Dream-A-Lot's Theme (I Will Live for Love)" (new recording)	Summer, DiGesare	4:54
Total length:			75:33

US edition
No.	Title	Writer(s)	Length
1.	"Love to Love You Baby"	Summer, Moroder, Bellotte	3:22
2.	"Could It Be Magic"	Anderson, Manilow	3:54
3.	"I Feel Love"	Summer, Moroder, Bellotte	3:46
4.	"I Love You"	Summer, Moroder, Bellotte	3:18
5.	"Last Dance"	Jabara	3:19
6.	"MacArthur Park"	Webb	3:54
7.	"Heaven Knows"	Summer, Moroder, Mathieson, Bellotte	3:39
8.	"Hot Stuff"	Faltermeyer, Forsey, Bellotte	3:50
9.	"Bad Girls"	Sudano, Summer, Hokenson, Esposito	3:57
10.	"Dim All the Lights"	Summer	3:58
11.	"No More Tears (Enough Is Enough)" (Duet With Barbra Streisand)	Roberts, Jabara	4:48
12.	"On the Radio"	Summer, Moroder	4:05
13.	"The Wanderer"	Summer, Moroder	3:46
14.	"Love Is in Control (Finger on the Trigger)"	Ross, Jones, Temperton	4:19
15.	"State of Independence"	Anderson, Vangelis	4:25
16.	"She Works Hard for the Money"	Summer, Omartian	4:10
17.	"This Time I Know It's for Real"	Summer, Stock, Aitken, Waterman	3:36
18.	"I Will Go with You (Con te partirò)"	Sartori, Quarantotto, Summer	4:08
19.	"That's the Way" (new recording)	Moroder, Forsey	3:45
20.	"Dream-A-Lot's Theme (I Will Live for Love)" (new recording)	Summer, DiGesare	4:54
Total length:			78:53

US limited edition bonus disc
No.	Title	Writer(s)	Length
1.	"I Feel Love" (12" Version)		8:15
2.	"Hot Stuff" (12" Version)		6:46
3.	"This Time I Know It's for Real" (12" Version)		7:24
4.	"Dream-A-Lot's Theme (I Will Live for Love)" (12" Extended Remix)		9:16
5.	"You're So Beautiful" (new recording) (Ultimate Club Mix)	Summer, DiGesare, Moran	10:50
Total length:			42:31

== Charts ==
Chart (2003–12)	Peak position
Belgian Albums (Ultratop Flanders)	32
Dutch Albums (Album Top 100)	57
French Albums (SNEP)	169
Italian Albums (FIMI)	42
New Zealand Albums (RMNZ)	39
Norwegian Albums (VG-lista)	27
Scottish Albums (Official Charts)	7
Swiss Albums (Schweizer Hitparade)	68
UK Albums (Official Charts)	6
US Billboard 200	111
US Top Catalog Albums (Billboard)	6

== Certifications and sales ==
Region	Certification	Certified units/sales
United Kingdom (BPI)	Gold	100,000^{^}
United States	—	211,000
^{^} Shipments figures based on certification alone.
