= Christmas Spirit (Donna Summer album) =

Studio album by Donna Summer
- Released: October 4, 1994
- Recorded: July 1993 – July 1994
- Studios: Tejas Recorders (Franklin, Tennessee); Sound Shop (Nashville, Tennessee); Javelina (Nashville, Tennessee)
- Genres: Christmas, R&B
- Length: 46:15
- Labels: Mercury, PolyGram
- Producer: Michael Omartian

Donna Summer chronology
The Donna Summer Anthology (1993)	Christmas Spirit (1994)	Endless Summer: Donna Summer's Greatest Hits (1994)

Christmas Spirit is the sixteenth studio album by American singer-songwriter Donna Summer, and her only Christmas album. It was released by Mercury Records on October 4, 1994, in the United States. Christmas Spirit was produced by Michael Omartian, who had collaborated with Summer on the albums She Works Hard for the Money (1983) and Cats Without Claws (1984), both as a producer and composer. Christmas Spirit consists of traditional and well-known Christmas songs and carols, as well as three new original songs and a cover of Amy Grant's "Breath of Heaven (Mary's Song)".

Christmas Spirit earned mixed reviews from music critics, many of whom found it solidly crafted but uninspired. Commercially, the album failed to chart during its original release. By 2006, it had sold more than 46,000 copies in the US. In 2005, Christmas Spirit was re-issued by Universal Music on the Mercury label. Re-titled 20th Century Masters: The Best of Donna Summer: The Christmas Collection in 2007, it entered the US Top Holiday Albums at number 40.

== Critical reception ==
Professional ratings
Review scores
Source	Rating
AllMusic	2/5 stars
Cross Rhythms	4/10

Allmusic editor Steven McDonald found that "Summer's contribution to the Christmas album market sounds good, courtesy of producer Michael Omartian, but it's about what you'd expect from the combination of Omartian and Summer: nicely produced, bland versions of songs such as "White Christmas," "I'll Be Home for Christmas," and "O Holy Night." Summer gives it a good try, however, and the album does have some appeal, if little forcefulness." Tony Cummings from Cross Rhythms called that album "a major let down. The choice of songs is chronically uninspired with both secular and sacred numbers being chronically over recorded [...] In fact, throughout the album the one-time disco diva hardly has a decent rhythm to sing across such is the dominance of the strings. An album only for saccharine Yuletide tastes." Vibe's Amy Linden felt that Christmas Spirit "is drenched in strings and celestial choirs, but is a bit heavy-handed and lacks the old ho ho ho — which somehow befits this disco queen turned born-again Christian."

== Charts performance ==
Upon release, Christmas Spirit failed to chart on any Billboard chart the United States. By 2006, it had sold more than 46,000 units domestically, according to Nielsen Soundscan. In 2007, the Universal Music-produced reissue of the album entered the US Top Holiday Albums at number 40.

== Track listing ==
All tracks produced by Michael Omartian.

No.	Title	Writer(s)	Length
1.	"White Christmas"	Irving Berlin	2:55
2.	"The Christmas Song"	Mel Tormé; Bob Wells	4:20
3.	"O Come All Ye Faithful"	Frederick Oakeley; John Francis Wade	4:40
4.	"Christmas Is Here"	Donna Summer; Michael Omartian; Bruce Sudano	3:22
5.	"Christmas Medley ("What Child Is This?"/"Do You Hear What I Hear?"/"Joy to the World")"	William Chatterton Dix; George Frideric Handel; Gloria Shayne; Noël Regney	5:20
6.	"I'll Be Home for Christmas"	Buck Ram; Kim Gannon; Walter Kent	3:30
7.	"Christmas Spirit"	Summer; Omartian; Sudano	4:53
8.	"Breath of Heaven"	Amy Grant; Chris Eaton	6:04
9.	"O Holy Night"	Adolphe Adam; John Sullivan Dwight	4:12
10.	"Lamb of God"	Omartian; Summer	7:24

== Personnel ==
- Donna Summer – vocals
- Michael Omartian – acoustic piano (1, 2, 4, 5, 7–10), synthesizers (2, 4, 7, 10), keyboards (6), organ (9)
- Dann Huff – guitars (2, 4, 5, 7, 9, 10)
- Jerry McPherson – guitars (2, 4, 5, 7, 9, 10)
- Danny O'Lannerghty – bass (2, 4, 5, 7, 9, 10)
- Chester Thompson – drums (2, 4, 5, 7, 9, 10)
- Ronn Huff – orchestra arrangements and conductor (1, 3, 8)
- The Nashville String Machine – orchestra (1, 3, 8)
- Heritage Children's Choir – children's choir (3, 4, 10)
- Mary P. Stephenson – children's choir conductor (3, 4, 10)
- Rachel Gaines – additional vocals (4)
- Amanda Omartian – additional vocals (4)
- Akil Thompson – additional vocals (4)
- Lisa Bevill – vocals (7)
- Kim Fleming – vocals (7)
- Michael Mellett – vocals (7)

Choir vocalists

- Travis Cottrell (3)
- Sheldon "Butch" Curry (3, 5, 10)
- Rick Gibson (3)
- David Holloway (3, 5, 10)
- Mark Ivey (3, 5, 10)
- Russell Mauldin (3, 5, 10)
- Michael Mellett (3, 5, 9, 10)
- Michael Omartian (3)
- Guy Penrod (3, 5, 9, 10)
- Gary Robinson (3, 5, 10)
- Chuck Sullivan (3)
- Dave Williamson (3, 5, 10)
- Mary George (5, 10)
- Lisa Glasgow (5, 10)
- Stephanie Hall (5, 10)
- Sarah Huffman (5, 10)
- Tammy Jansen (5, 10)
- Ellen Musick (5, 10)
- Leah Taylor (5, 10)
- Melodie Tunney (5, 10)
- Kim Fleming (9)
- Donna McElroy (9)
- Angelo Petrucci (9)
- Veronica Petrucci (9)
- Suzanne Schwartz (9)
- Ken "Scat" Springs (9)
- Roz Thompson (9)

=== Production and Technical ===
- Terry Christian – engineer, mixing
- Jim Dineen – additional engineer
- Robert Charles – assistant engineer
- Larry Jefferies – assistant engineer
- Scott Link – assistant engineer
- King Williams – assistant engineer
- Mark Capps – assistant mix engineer
- John Dickson – assistant mix engineer
- Gerardo Bernard – executive coordinator
- Suzy Martinez – production coordinator
- Giulio Turturro – design
- Harry Langdon – cover photography

== Charts ==
Chart (2007)	Peak position
US Top Holiday Albums (Billboard)	40
