= Carry On (Donna Summer song) =

Single by Donna Summer and Giorgio Moroder

from the album Forever Dancing
- Released: 1992
- Recorded: 1992
- Genre: Pop; dance
- Length: 3:41
- Label: Virgin
- Songwriters: Giorgio Moroder; Marietta Waters
- Producer: Giorgio Moroder

Donna Summer singles chronology
"Work That Magic" (1991)	"Carry On" (1992)	"Melody of Love (Wanna Be Loved)" (1994)

Giorgio Moroder singles chronology
"To Be Number One" (1990)	"Carry On" (1992)	"74 Is the New 24" (2014)

"Carry On" is a song by American singer Donna Summer and Italian composer, songwriter, and record producer Giorgio Moroder. The song was first released on Moroder's 1992 album Forever Dancing. It was written by Moroder and Marietta Waters, and produced by the former. It was released as the album's first and only single by Virgin Records. The following year, the song closed Summer's two-disc set The Donna Summer Anthology. During the 1970s Moroder had co-written and co-produced many of Summer's disco hits, and this song marked the first time the two had worked together in more than a decade.

The recording features background vocals by Summer's children, Brooklyn and Amanda Grace Sudano, along with co-writers Waters and Moroder, and Larry Lee. "Carry On" was released as a single in Germany in 1992 and some years later was remixed and released as a single, reaching #25 on the U.S. Dance charts in 1997 and #65 on the UK singles chart in 1998. That same year it won the first Grammy award for Best Dance Recording.

== Critical reception ==
On the 1997 release, Barry Walters for The Advocate said, "As a personality, Summer remains a ditz, but as a voice of the dance floor, she remains the ultimate artist, and this soaring survival anthem reminds us why. The words may deal with perseverance, a theme we know all to well, but the melody and her performance is all about transcendence. It's been decades since Summer has sounded as if she's singing about us, for us, with us." Same year, Larry Flick from Billboard magazine wrote, "A biggie on European import, this rousing track could resuscitate Summer's life at pop radio, while giving her ever-loyal and patient disciples a batch of new remixes on which to feast. She is the picture of pure exuberance here, once again affirming why she remains an unmatchable vocalist in the minds of anyone who has ever tripped the club fantastic." He added, "The new versions by Eric Kupper, Chris Cox, and Outta Control are all quite nice, though it's hard to move away from the original Moroder production, which is as bright as a sunny Sunday-afternoon tea dance." Pan-European magazine Music & Media commented on the original 1992 release, "With its strong melodic hooks, this is a worthy successor to the chartbusters these artists created in the '70s and early '80s. A must for both pop and dance programmers."

== Charts ==
Chart (1997)	Peak position
US Hot Dance Club Play (Billboard)	25

Chart (1998)	Peak position
UK Singles (OCC)	65
