= Any Way at All =

Single by Donna Summer

from the album Endless Summer: Donna Summer's Greatest Hits
- B-side: "Medley"
- Released: 1994
- Recorded: 1994
- Genre: Pop; soul; R&B; gospel
- Length: 4:16
- Label: Casablanca; Mercury
- Songwriter(s): Donna Summer; Bruce Sudano; Eric Silver
- Producer(s): Michael Omartian

Donna Summer singles chronology
| "Melody of Love (Wanna Be Loved)" (1994) | "Any Way at All" (1994) | "I Feel Love (1995 Remix)" (1995) |

"Any Way at All" is a song by American singer-songwriter Donna Summer, recorded as a new track for her 1994 compilation album, Endless Summer: Donna Summer's Greatest Hits. The song written by Summer, her husband Bruce Sudano and Eric Silver, and produced by Michael Omartian. It was released in 1994 as the album's second and final single by Casablanca Records and Mercury Records. The ballad was released in selected countries, with the B-side consisting of a medley of four of her original disco hits from the 1970s: "Dim All the Lights", "Hot Stuff", "Bad Girls", and "Last Dance" 3:43. The cassette single (Casablanca/Mercury 856 803–4) also included "I Feel Love (86th Street Radio Edit)" 4:35, which was not otherwise released in the U.S.

== Critical reception ==
Fell and Rufer from the Gavin Report wrote, "Donna Summer hooks up with producer Michael Omartian to make a new track that just happens to fit comfortably in the context of her greatest hits package, appropriately titled Endless Summer. This one shines as though it already was one of her greatest."
