= Dream-A-Lot's Theme (I Will Live for Love) =

Single by Donna Summer
- Released: 2004
- Recorded: 2003
- Genre: Dance, House, pop, Club
- Length: 4:52
- Label: Mercury Records/Universal Music
- Songwriter(s): Donna Summer/Nathan DiGesare
- Producer(s): Giorgio Moroder

Donna Summer singles chronology
"You're So Beautiful" (2003)	"Dream-A-Lot's Theme (I Will Live for Love)" (2004)	"I Got Your Love" (2005)

"Dream-A-Lot's Theme (I Will Live for Love)" is a song recorded by Donna Summer in 2003.

The song was not released as a commercial single. It was included as one of three new tracks on Universal's greatest hits package The Journey: The Very Best of Donna Summer and released as a 12" promo single to club DJs. "Dream-A-Lot's Theme" reached #20 on the US Club Play Chart in 2004.

In 2005 the track was included on a second Universal compilation, Gold.

The song appeared on the musical, The Legend of Dreamway.

== Charts ==
Chart (2004)	Peak Position
Hot Dance Club Play	20
