= Work That Magic =

Single by Donna Summer

from the album Mistaken Identity
- B-side: "Let There Be Peace"
- Released: November 18, 1991
- Recorded: 1991
- Genre: Pop; new jack swing; R&B; dance-pop; house
- Length: 5:00
- Label: Atlantic (United States); Warner Bros. (Europe)
- Songwriters: Donna Summer; Keith Diamond; Eve Nelson; Anthony Smith; Larry Henley
- Producer: Keith Diamond

Donna Summer singles chronology
"When Love Cries" (1991)	"Work That Magic" (1991)	"Carry On" (1992)

Music video
- "Work That Magic" on YouTube

"Work That Magic" is a song by American singer and songwriter Donna Summer. It was written by her with Keith Diamond, Eve Nelson, Anthony Smith and Larry Henley and produced by Diamond. The song was released on November 18, 1991, by Atlantic and Warner Bros. Records (Europe), as the second and final single from Summer's fifteenth studio album, Mistaken Identity (1991). In some countries' editions of the album (including the UK), the version of the song was a remix by Ian Stanley. The edited version of the remix was used in the song's music video. This version was released as a single in the UK (in place of "When Love Cries", which had been a single in America and Europe). While most of the album had quite an urban feel, this song was much more of a dance number. It peaked at number 74 in the UK Singles Chart.

== Critical reception ==
In their review of the Mistaken Identity album, Billboard magazine described the song as "house-inflected" and picked it as a "worthy candidate" to follow up "When Love Cries".

== Track listing ==
- US 12" single (1991) Atlantic 0-85925
1. "Work That Magic" (Extended ISA Remix) - 6:20
2. "Work That Magic" (ISA Remix) - 5:00
3. "Work That Magic" (Capricorn Remix) - 4:34
4. "Let There Be Peace" (LP Version) - 3:59
- US 12" single (1991) WEA International Inc. U 5937T
1. "Work That Magic" (Extended ISA Remix)
2. "Work That Magic" (Capricorn ISA Remix)
3. "Let There Be Peace"
- US 12" promo (1991) Atlantic DMD 1758
1. "Work That Magic" (Extended ISA Remix) - 6:20
2. "Work That Magic" (ISA Remix) - 5:00
3. "Work That Magic" (Capricorn Remix) - 4:34
4. "Let There Be Peace" (LP Version) - 3:59
- UK CD single (1991) Warner Bros. U5937CD
1. "Work That Magic" (ISA Full Length Remix) - 5:00
2. "This Time I Know It's for Real" - 3:36
3. "Dinner With Gershwin" - 4:37
4. "State of Independence" - 5:50

== Charts ==
Chart (1991–92)	Peak position
Australia (ARIA)	147
UK Singles (OCC)	74
