= You're So Beautiful =

Single by Donna Summer
- Released: 2003
- Recorded: 2003
- Genre: Dance; pop; house; EDM
- Label: Mercury Records/Universal Music
- Songwriter: Donna Summer/Tony Moran/Nathan DiGesare
- Producer: Tony Moran

Donna Summer singles chronology
"The Power of One" (2000)	"You're So Beautiful" (2003)	"Dream-A-Lot's Theme (I Will Live for Love)" (2004)

"You're So Beautiful" is a song recorded by Donna Summer in 2003. It was written by Summer, Tony Moran, and Nathan DiGesare, and produced by Moran.

Despite the fact that the song wasn't given a commercial release as a single, but included as one of three new tracks on Universal's greatest hits package The Journey: The Very Best of Donna Summer (2003) and only released as a 12" promo single to club DJs, "You're So Beautiful" became a dance hit, reaching number 5 on the US Billboard Dance Club Songs chart and number 13 on Billboard's Hot Dance Airplay chart.

In 2005 the track was included on a second Universal compilation, Gold.

== Track listing ==
- A. You're So Beautiful (Tony & Mac's Dancefloor Journey Mix) - 10:32
- B. You're So Beautiful (Friscia & Lamboy Beautiful Vocal Mix) - 9:28

== Other versions ==
- Ultimate Club Mix - 10:50 (released on limited-edition version of The Journey: The Very Best of Donna Summer)
- Tony Moran Edit - 4:05 (released on Gold)

== Charts ==
Chart (2003)	Peak Position
Hot Dance Club Play	5
Hot Dance Airplay	13
