= When Love Takes Over You =

Single by Donna Summer

from the album Another Place and Time
- B-side: "Bad Reputation"
- Released: November 13, 1989
- Studio: PWL (London, England)
- Genre: Pop; dance
- Length: 4:13
- Label: Warner Bros. (Europe)
- Songwriters: Mike Stock; Matt Aitken; Pete Waterman
- Producer: Stock, Aitken & Waterman

Donna Summer singles chronology
"Breakaway" (1989)	"When Love Takes Over You" (1989)	"When Love Cries" (1991)

"When Love Takes Over You" is a song by American singer and songwriter Donna Summer, released on November 13, 1989 by Warner Bros. Records (Europe) as the fifth and final single from her fourteenth album, Another Place and Time (1989). Like the rest of the album, the song was written and produced by British production team Stock Aitken & Waterman (SAW). Not released in America, the song just managed to enter the UK Singles Chart at number 72, having been remixed for its release as a single.

== Background and writing ==
"When Love Takes Over You" was originally conceived by SAW for possible inclusion on Bananarama's Wow album, but it was rejected by the trio. Writer and producer Mike Stock felt that it was not a great choice of single, believing there to be better options available on the Another Place and Time album.

== Critical reception ==
Taylor Dayne reviewed the song for Number One, saying, "She's got a brilliant voice, there's so much character in her singing that it's unmistakable." In a retrospective review, Pop Rescue considered "When Love Takes Over You" as "far more mellow and less catchy" than "I Don't Wanna Get Hurt", the previous track on the album, and remarked that "[Summer]'s vocals are softer, and it's musically more gentle too, with pianos, and a slower beat".

== Track listing ==
- 7"
1. "When Love Takes Over You (Remix)" – 3:37
2. "Bad Reputation" – 4:08
- UK 12"/UK 3inch CDS
1. "When Love Takes Over You (Extended Remix)" – 6:14
2. "When Love Takes Over You (Instrumental)" – 3:37
3. "Bad Reputation" – 4:08

== Charts ==
Chart (1989)	Peak position
UK Singles (OCC)	72
