= Donna Wyant =

Donna McLaughlin Wyant is an American actress, director, singer, songwriter, and producer. She is an Emmy Award winning producer, and Clio Award recipient for her network television promotional campaigns. She is an alumna of the HB Studio, where she studied with Uta Hagen.

Acting credits include: playing the role of Jeanie in the first European tour of the musical Hair, which opened in Munich in 1968; numerous off-Broadway productions; The Wellfleet Harbor Players and The Provincetown Players in Cape Cod, Massachusetts; Teatro Goldoni in Italy; The Ramses Shaffy Theater; and La MaMa Experimental Theatre Club in Amsterdam.

A collaborator and close friend of Donna Summer, (they met while performing in Hair) she cowrote several songs on Summer's 1991 album, Mistaken Identity. Songs she cowrote for Summer include Fred Astaire, Say a Little Prayer, the album's title track Mistaken Identity, and What Is It You Want. She has written songs with Donna Summer, Keith Diamond, Anthony Smith, Vince Lawrence, and David Resnik, among others. She also composed and arranged It's the Small Things recorded by Kathy Troccoli.

As of 2023, she has been directing theatrical productions in Connecticut.
