= Once Upon a Time (Donna Summer album) =

Studio album by Donna Summer
- Released: October 31, 1977
- Recorded: July – September 1977
- Studios: Musicland, Munich, Germany
- Genre: Disco
- Length: 69:15
- Label: Casablanca
- Producers: Giorgio Moroder; Pete Bellotte

Donna Summer chronology
I Remember Yesterday (1977)	Once Upon a Time (1977)	Live and More (1978)

Singles from Once Upon a Time
- 1. "I Love You" Released: December 1977; 2. "Fairy Tale High" Released: December 1977 (Germany only); 3. "Once Upon a Time" Released: 1978 (Japan only); 4. "Rumour Has It" Released: March 1978

Once Upon a Time is the sixth studio album by American singer-songwriter Donna Summer. It was released on October 31, 1977, and peaked at No. 26 on the US Billboard 200, number thirteen on the Top R&B/Hip-Hop Albums chart and No. 24 on the UK Albums Chart. The entire album charted as one entry at No. 1 on the Hot Dance/Disco chart. Once Upon a Time includes the singles "I Love You", "Fairy Tale High", "Once Upon a Time" and "Rumour Has It". The album did not spawn a hit single as popular as "I Feel Love".

The concept album was Summer's (and disco's) first double album, telling a modern-day Cinderella-themed story through means of disco music. The album's story concept was conceived by Joyce Bogart, Susan Munao and Donna Summer based on an idea by Al Bogatz. The songs were written in collaboration between Summer, Giorgio Moroder and Pete Bellotte. The album was her last to be recorded entirely at Musicland Studios in Munich. Arrangements were handled by Bob Esty while electronic arrangements were the work of Moroder. The artwork was designed by Stephen Lumel and Gribbitt! with photography by Francesco Scavullo.

== Concept and image ==
Summer's previous two records were musical concept albums: 1976's Four Seasons of Love told the story of a love affair by relating it to the four seasons, while 1977's I Remember Yesterday presented a musical catalogue of musical styles and lyrical themes from the past, present and an imagined future. Once Upon a Time is another concept album—the first "disco opera" per Robert Christgau—developed by Joyce Bogart, Susan Munao and Donna Summer as a modern-day Cinderella narrative.

Throughout the album and as described in the liner notes storyline, the songs tell the story of a young woman who lives in a fantasy world of make-believe in which she is seemingly trapped, but thanks to her belief in her dreams she embarks on an adventure that ends with the man she loves entering her life. The "rags to riches" story is brought into the modern day via the use of the electronic disco sound.

== Release and reception ==
Professional ratings
Review scores
Source	Rating
AllMusic	3/5 stars
Christgau's Record Guide	B−
The Encyclopedia of Popular Music	3/5 stars
Record Mirror	1/5 stars
The Rolling Stone Album Guide	3.5/5 stars
Sounds	5/5 stars
Variety	favourable

The Bay State Banner noted that Once Upon a Time "was one of the most candid portraits of fantasy and insecurity yet issued in the disco genre, and its confessions were credited to Summer's own pen." The Globe and Mail praised "A Man Like You", writing that Summer "doesn't groan or pant out her version of sexspeak, she actually opens up and sings... But for three minutes of good vocals it just isn't worth wading through the other 60 minutes of militarism." John Rockwell, of The New York Times, listed Once Upon a Time as the eighth best album of 1977.

The album made the US Top 30 and was certified gold in the U.S. by the RIAA that same year, spending well over a year on the charts. It spawned the European hit single "I Love You", which became her fifth Top 10 in the UK in less than two years, and it also hit the US Top 40. "Rumour Has It" was also a UK Top 20 hit.

== Track listing ==
All tracks are written by Donna Summer, Giorgio Moroder, and Pete Bellotte; all tracks produced by Moroder and Bellotte.

Side 1
No.	Title	Length
1.	"Once Upon a Time"	4:02
2.	"Faster and Faster to Nowhere"	3:34
3.	"Fairy Tale High"	4:25
4.	"Say Something Nice"	4:44

Side 2
No.	Title	Length
1.	"Now I Need You"	6:09
2.	"Working the Midnight Shift"	5:07
3.	"Queen for a Day"	5:59

Side 3
No.	Title	Length
1.	"If You Got It Flaunt It"	4:43
2.	"A Man Like You"	3:34
3.	"Sweet Romance"	4:31
4.	"(Theme) Once Upon a Time"	0:48
5.	"Dance into My Life"	4:10

Side 4
No.	Title	Length
1.	"Rumour Has It"	4:57
2.	"I Love You"	4:43
3.	"Happily Ever After"	3:51
4.	"(Theme) Once Upon a Time"	3:58

== Charts ==
=== Weekly charts ===
Weekly chart performance for Once Upon a Time
Chart (1977–78)	Peak position
Australian Albums (Kent Music Report)	44
Canada Top Albums/CDs (RPM)	27
Finnish Albums (Suomen virallinen lista)	8
French Albums (SNEP)	3
Italian Albums (Musica e dischi)	1
Japanese Albums (Oricon)	31
Norwegian Albums (VG-lista)	9
Portuguese Albums (Musica & Som)	2
Spanish Albums (AFE)	10
UK Albums (Official Charts)	24
US Billboard 200	26
US Top R&B/Hip-Hop Albums (Billboard)	13
US Dance Club Songs (Billboard)	1
US Cashbox Top Albums	24

=== Year-end charts ===
1978 year-end chart performance for Once Upon a Time
Chart (1978)	Position
US Top R&B/Hip-Hop Albums (Billboard)	46

== Certifications ==
Certifications for Once Upon a Time
Region	Certification	Certified units/sales
Canada (Music Canada)	Gold	50,000^{^}
France (SNEP)	Gold	100,000^{*}
United Kingdom (BPI)	Gold	100,000^{^}
United States (RIAA)	Gold	500,000^{^}
^{*} Sales figures based on certification alone.^{^} Shipments figures based on certification alone.
