= Mistaken Identity (Donna Summer album) =

Studio album by Donna Summer
- Released: August 23, 1991
- Recorded: November 1990–May 1991
- Studio: Unique (New York City)
- Genres: Dance-pop; soul; urban; new jack swing; R&B
- Length: 54:59
- Labels: Atlantic (United States); Warner Bros. (Europe)
- Producer: Keith Diamond

Donna Summer chronology
Another Place and Time (1989)	Mistaken Identity (1991)	The Donna Summer Anthology (1993)

Singles from Mistaken Identity
- 1. "When Love Cries" Released: August 12, 1991; 2. "Work That Magic" Released: November 18, 1991

Professional ratings
Review scores
Source	Rating
AllMusic	2/5 stars
Entertainment Weekly	B+
Los Angeles Times	2/4 stars

Mistaken Identity is the fifteenth studio album by American singer-songwriter Donna Summer, released on August 23, 1991, by Atlantic Records and Warner Bros. Records. A musical departure for Summer, Mistaken Identity was her last release under Atlantic Records. The album was a commercial failure and failed to chart, although it reached number 97 on the Top R&B/Hip-Hop Albums. The lead single, "When Love Cries" entered the Billboard Hot 100 at number 77, but the second and final single "Work That Magic" failed to chart in the US.

== Background ==
Since making her name as the biggest female star of the disco era in the 1970s, Summer had experimented with different musical genres throughout the 1980s with varying degrees of success. For Mistaken Identity, Summer adopted a more urban style.

== Commercial performance ==
The album was not a commercial success and failed to chart on both the US Billboard 200 and UK Albums Chart. However, it spent a single week on the US Billboard R&B Albums chart, at No. 97.

== Singles ==
The first single released from the album, "When Love Cries", peaked at No. 77 on the US Billboard Hot 100 and No. 18 on the Billboard R&B charts. "Work That Magic" was released as the second and only single in the United Kingdom where it reached No. 74 in the UK Singles Chart.

== Track listing ==
No.	Title	Writer(s)	Length
1.	"Get Ethnic"	Donna Summer, Keith Diamond, Paul Chiten, Anthony Smith, Larry Henley	5:21
2.	"Body Talk"	Summer, Diamond, Chiten, Smith, Henley	4:48
3.	"Work That Magic"	Summer, Diamond, Chiten, Smith, Henley	5:00
4.	"When Love Cries"	Summer, Diamond, Chiten, Smith, Henley	5:15
5.	"Heaven's Just a Whisper Away"	Diamond, Henley, Smith	4:06
6.	"Cry of a Waking Heart"	Betsy Cook, Bruce Woolley	4:36
7.	"Friends Unknown"	Summer, Diamond, Smith, Vanessa Smith	3:44
8.	"Fred Astaire"	Summer, Diamond, Smith, Donna Wyant	4:40
9.	"Say a Little Prayer"	Summer, Diamond, Smith, Wyant	4:07
10.	"Mistaken Identity"	Summer, Diamond, Smith, Wyant	4:08
11.	"What Is It You Want"	Summer, Diamond, Wyant, Smith, Vince Lawrence, Dave Resnik	4:40
12.	"Let There Be Peace"	Summer, Diamond	3:59

2014 Demon Music Group bonus tracks
No.	Title	Writer(s)	Length
13.	"When Love Cries" (Single Remix)	Summer, Diamond, Chiten, Smith, Henley	4:12
14.	"When Love Cries" (Vocal Club Dub / Summertime Remix)	Summer, Diamond, Chiten, Smith, Henley	7:36
15.	"Work That Magic" (ISA Extended Remix)	Summer, Diamond, Chiten, Smith, Henley	6:15

Notes

- The ISA Full-Length Remix of "Work That Magic" was used for later UK & Europe releases and the 2014 Demon Music Group reissue.

== Personnel ==
- Donna Summer – lead vocals (1–10, 12), backing vocals (1–6, 8–10), rap (4), all vocals (11)
- Keith Diamond – keyboards (1–10, 12), rap (2), string arrangements (5, 7)
- Paul Chiten – keyboards (1)
- Eve Nelson – keyboards (2–4, 6), string arrangements (5, 7), acoustic piano solo (6), acoustic piano (7, 12), additional keyboards (8)
- Anthony Smith – backing vocals (5, 6, 8–10), keyboards (10), "intro madness" (10)
- Vince Lawrence – keyboards (11)
- Joe Taylor – guitars (1, 7), additional guitars (2, 4)
- Vicki Genfan – guitars (2)
- Rafe Van Hoy – guitars (3)
- Skip McDonald – guitars (4, 9, 10)
- Paul Pesco – acoustic guitar (5), guitars (7)
- Dave Resnik – guitar "vibe" (11)
- Ira Siegel – guitars (12)
- Carl James – rap (2), bass (7, 12)
- Kaydee – ethnic drums (1), percussion (1, 5), rap (2), "assorted funkiness" (2, 11), drums (9), "intro madness" (10)
- Joe Hornoff – drums (4)
- J.T. Lewis – drums (5, 7, 12)
- O.C. Rodriguez – additional drums (9)
- Bob Conti a.k.a. Bob "Mr. Shaker" Conti – percussion (2, 5, 10)
- Danny Wilensky – saxophone (2, 7)
- Steven McLoughlin – "on a Harley D" (2)
- The 'Heart' Strings (Ann Labin, Cathy Metz, Suzanne Ornstein, Sally Schumway and Suzie Schumway) – strings (5, 7)
- Mary Ellen Bernard – backing vocals (1–4)
- Susan Macke – backing vocals (1–4)
- Gene Miller – backing vocals (1–4)
- Neil Thomas – rap (4)
- Tracy Amos – backing vocals (5, 6, 8–10)
- Sabelle Breer – backing vocals (5, 6, 8–10)
- Cliff Dawson – backing vocals (5, 6, 8–10)
- Craig Derry – backing vocals (5, 6, 8–10)
- Lauren Kinhan – backing vocals (5, 6, 8–10)
- Yogi Lee – backing vocals (5, 6, 8–10)
- Biti Strauchn – backing vocals (5, 6, 8–10)
- The McClendon Choir – backing vocals (12)

=== Production ===
- Keith Diamond – producer, arrangements, mixing
- Ian Stanley – producer (3), remixing (3)
- George Karras – engineer, mixing
- J.C. Convertino – additional engineer
- Acar Key – additional engineer
- Peter Robbins – additional engineer
- Bob Rosa – additional engineer
- Shawn 'Fido' Berman – assistant engineer
- Carl Glanville – assistant engineer
- Jeff Lippay – assistant engineer
- Steven John McLoughlin – assistant engineer
- Darien Sahanaja – assistant engineer
- Joe Seta – assistant engineer
- Andy Udoff – assistant engineer
- Adam Yellin – assistant engineer
- Herb Powers Jr. – mastering
- Donna Summer – album art concept
- Tracy Nicholas Bledsoe – album cover coordination
- Bill Smith Studio (London) – design
- Harry Langdon – photography
- Gina Delgado – stylist

Studios

- Recorded at Unique Recording Studios, The Hit Factory, Electric Lady Studios, RPM Studios and My Blue Heaven Studios (New York City, New York); Interface Studios (Bayside, New York); Presence Studios (Westport, CT); Rumbo Recorders (Los Angeles, California); Encore Studios (Burbank, California); Track Record Studios (North Hollywood, California); American Recording Co. (Calabasas, California).
- Mastered at The Hit Factory.
- Studio managers – Tony Drootin (Unique Studios, NY); Vicki Camblin (Rumbo Recorders, LA); Troy Germano (The Hit Factory, NY); Bob Mason (RPM Studios, NY); Daryl Simmons (Encore Studios, LA); John Russell (Presence Studios, CT).

== Charts ==
Chart performance for Mistaken Identity
Chart (1991)	Peak position
US Top R&B/Hip-Hop Albums (Billboard)	97
US Cashbox Top Albums	124
