= Breakaway (Donna Summer song) =

Single by Donna Summer

from the album Another Place and Time / The Best of Donna Summer
- B-side: "Thinkin' Bout My Baby"
- Released: October 1989 (US); December 31, 1990 (UK)
- Recorded: 1989 at PWL, London
- Genre: Pop; dance; soul; R&B
- Length: 4:10 (album version); 3:34 (remix); 6:44 (remix full version)
- Label: Atlantic Records (US); Warner Bros. Records (Europe)
- Songwriters: Matt Aitken; Mike Stock; Pete Waterman
- Producer: Stock, Aitken & Waterman

Donna Summer singles chronology
"Love's About to Change My Heart" (1989)	"Breakaway" (1989)	"When Love Takes Over You" (1989)

"Breakaway" is a song by American singer-songwriter Donna Summer, released in October 1989 by Atlantic and Warner Bros. Records (Europe) as the third and final US single and fifth and final European single from her fourteenth album, Another Place and Time (1989). It was a top-50 hit in UK and is written and produced by Stock, Aitken & Waterman.

== Background and release ==
The album was written by popular British production team Stock, Aitken & Waterman and produced four UK hit singles, including the international smash "This Time I Know It's For Real". Three of these hits later turned up on a Europe-only compilation album entitled The Best of Donna Summer, released in 1990 by Warner Bros. Records. The album also included "Breakaway" which had previously only been released as a single in the US. However, due to the album's popularity and following the re-release of the 1982 hit "State of Independence" a brand new remixed version of "Breakaway" by Phil Harding and Ian Curnow was issued in the single form.

The original 1989 release of "Breakaway" was the third and final single to be released in the United States from Another Place and Time. The song was serviced to radio stations on promo 45s and cd singles. The track was also remixed by Tony Humphries as "The Extended Power Mix" and "The Power Radio Mix" for the US 12" single. The "Breakaway" US 12" single was backed with the extended version of "I Don't Wanna Get Hurt", which had already been released in the UK as the follow-up to "This Time I Know It's For Real". Despite its original A/C feel and house influenced remixes, the track did not chart in the US.

== Critical reception ==
A reviewer from Music & Media commented, "...originally produced by Stock, Aitken & Waterman, this is the remix by Harding/Curnow. One of the most added records this week, it's bound to be a winter hit for Donna." Pop Rescue stated that "Breakaway" "musically sounds like nothing else" on Another Place and Time, noticed "its slight Latin sound" which it considered as the possible reason for which it achieved success in Brazil, but added that "this isn't the strongest song that SAW release despite its positive and uplifting lyrics".

== Chart performance ==
"Breakaway" managed to enter the UK top 50, peaking at number 49.

== Track listings ==
1989 US 7" single

1. "Breakaway" – 4:10
2. "Thinkin' Bout My Baby" – 6:18

1991 UK 7" single

1. "Breakaway (Remix)" – 3:34 (remixed by Phil Harding & Ian Curnow)
2. "Love Is In Control (Finger On The Trigger)" – 4:17

1989 US 12" single

1. "Breakaway (The Extended Power Mix)" – 6:08 (remixed by Tony Humphries)
2. "Breakaway (The Power Radio Mix)" – 4:02 (remixed by Tony Humphries)
3. "I Don't Wanna Get Hurt (12" Version)" – 6:58

1991 UK 12" single / UK CD single

1. "Breakaway (Remix Full Version)" – 6:44 (remixed by Phil Harding & Ian Curnow)
2. "Breakaway (Remix Edit)" – 3:34 (remixed by Phil Harding & Ian Curnow)
3. "Love Is In Control (Finger On The Trigger)" – 4:17

== Charts ==
=== Weekly charts ===
1991 weekly chart performance for "Breakaway"
Chart (1991)	Peak position
Europe (European Airplay Top 50)	38
UK Singles (OCC)	49
UK Airplay (Music Week)	13
UK Dance (Music Week)	45

2022 weekly chart performance for "Breakaway"
Chart (2022)	Peak position
Hungary (Single Top 40)	37

=== Year-end charts ===
1992 year-end chart performance for "Breakaway"
Chart (1992)	Position
Brazil (Crowley)	50
