= I Got Your Love =

Single by Donna Summer
- Released: December 20, 2005
- Recorded: 2003
- Genre: Dance, pop
- Label: Mercury Records/Universal Music Enterprises
- Songwriters: Donna Summer, Bruce Roberts
- Producer: Peter Stengaard

Donna Summer singles chronology
"Dream-A-Lot's Theme (I Will Live For Love)" (2004)	"I Got Your Love" (2005)	"I'm a Fire" (2008)

"I Got Your Love" is a song by Donna Summer, released as a single on December 20, 2005. Earlier, the single was first premiered during an episode of Sex and the City in 2003 and later released both as a download single and on CD by the Mercury Records and Universal Music Enterprises labels. "I Got Your Love" became another dancefloor hit for Summer, reaching #4 on the US Club Play chart in early 2006. "I Got Your Love" was written by Summer and Bruce Roberts, and produced by Peter Stengaard. Before the song, Roberts and Summer had duetted on "Whenever There Is Love" in 1996. "I Got Your Love" was released with remixes by Ralphi Rosario, L.E.X. and Eddie Baez.

== Track listing ==
=== CD single ===
1. "I Got Your Love" (Ralphi Rosario Extended Vocal) - 9:51
2. "I Got Your Love" (Ralphi Rosario Dub) - 9:20
3. "I Got Your Love" (L.E.X. Club) - 10:55
4. "I Got Your Love" (L.E.X. Radio Edit) - 3:33
5. "I Got Your Love" (Eddie Baez Vocal Anthem Mix) - 8:39
6. "I Got Your Love" (Original Radio Edit) - 3:56

== Charts ==
Chart (2006)	Peak Position
Hot Dance Club Play	4
