= All Systems Go (Donna Summer album) =

Studio album by Donna Summer
- Released: September 15, 1987
- Recorded: October 1985–June 1987
- Studios: Oasis Recording Studios and Studio 55 (Los Angeles, California, US); Conway Studios, Soundcastle and One On One Studios (Hollywood, California, US); Musicland Studios, Red Deer Studios and Union Studios (Munich, Germany)
- Genres: Pop; dance; rock; soul; smooth jazz
- Length: 43:04
- Label: Geffen
- Producers: Harold Faltermeyer; Peter Bunetta; Rick Chudacoff; Richard Perry; Donna Summer; Keith Nelson; Jeff Lams

Donna Summer chronology
The Dance Collection: A Compilation of Twelve Inch Singles (1987)	All Systems Go (1987)	Another Place and Time (1989)

Singles from All Systems Go
- 1. "Dinner with Gershwin" Released: August 7, 1987; 2. "Only the Fool Survives" Released: November 1987; 3. "All Systems Go" Released: January 18, 1988

All Systems Go is the thirteenth studio album by Donna Summer. It was released on September 15, 1987; it would be her final release on Geffen Records, which had been Summer's label since 1980.

There were two singles released in the United States, "Dinner with Gershwin" and "Only the Fool Survives", although both failed to reach the top 40 of the US Billboard Hot 100.

The title cut, "All Systems Go" was released as a single in the United Kingdom. The album peaked at number 122 on the US Billboard 200, becoming her lowest charting studio album to date.

== Background ==
The album was Summer's first release since her 1984 album Cats Without Claws. In 1986, David Geffen hired Harold Faltermeyer to produce the album at Summer's urging. The objective was a tough FM-oriented sound; Faltermeyer had just finished the scores for the films Fletch (1985) and Top Gun (1986).

Summer was adamant that the album should have stronger R&B influences on it. After the album was completed, Geffen heard the tracks and liked them but his executive team didn't think there were enough songs that could be deemed as singles.

They had another song they wanted Faltermeyer to produce, but he was already working on other soundtrack projects. The song was "Dinner with Gershwin", and Richard Perry was hired to produce it with track writer Brenda Russell.

Faltermeyer was surprised that nobody on the Geffen team saw the potential for "Fascination", "Voices Cryin' Out" or "Thinkin' Bout My Baby" as singles. "We had other songs completed for All Systems Go that didn't make the final cut, like "Money Talks", which I was surprised they passed on, and there are a couple others that would have completed our original version for the album, before "Dinner with Gershwin" and "Bad Reputation" became substitutes. The decision was made afterward by executives who were looking for a radio hit for 1987, and not something that would perhaps last beyond then".

Summer was credited as co-writer on seven of the nine tracks.

== Release and aftermath ==
Professional ratings
Review scores
Source	Rating
AllMusic	2/5 stars
The Rolling Stone Album Guide	2/5 stars

In the US, "Dinner with Gershwin" became Summer's last Top Ten R&B hit and reached No. 48 on the pop charts. It gave Summer her highest UK chart placing (No. 13) since the '70s, also reaching No. 13 in Ireland and No. 43 in the Netherlands.

All Systems Go became the first album by Summer to fall short of the Top 100 on Billboard's album chart, peaking at No. 122 and dropping off completely after six weeks. It also failed to reach the UK Top 75.

"Only the Fool Survives" with Mickey Thomas of Starship was the second single released from the album. In the UK, "All Systems Go" reached No. 54.

== Track listing ==
Side one
No.	Title	Writer(s)	Length
1.	"All Systems Go"	Harold Faltermeyer, Donna Summer	4:13
2.	"Bad Reputation"	Peter Bunetta, Joe Erickson, Summer	4:14
3.	"Love Shock"	Faltermeyer, Bruce Sudano, Summer	4:16
4.	"Jeremy"	Faltermeyer, Pit Floss, Andy Slovic, Summer, Hannes Treibe	4:40
5.	"Only the Fool Survives" (duet with Mickey Thomas)	John Bettis, Michael Omartian, Sudano, Summer, Virgil Weber, Faltermeyer	4:42

Side two
No.	Title	Writer(s)	Length
1.	"Dinner with Gershwin"	Brenda Russell	4:39
2.	"Fascination"	Eddie Schwartz, David Tyson	4:30
3.	"Voices Cryin' Out"	Faltermeyer, Summer	5:20
4.	"Thinkin' Bout My Baby"	Jeffrey Lams, Keith D. Nelson, Summer	6:20

2014 Demon Music Group bonus tracks
No.	Title	Writer(s)	Length
10.	"Tearin' Down the Walls"	Siedah Garrett, Tony Maiden	3:59
11.	"All Systems Go" (Edit)	Faltermeyer, Summer	3:50
12.	"All Systems Go" (Extended Remix)	Faltermeyer, Summer	8:03
13.	"Dinner with Gershwin" (Edit)	Russell	4:12
14.	"Dinner with Gershwin" (Extended Version)	Russell	7:43
15.	"Dinner with Gershwin" (Instrumental)	Russell	4:12
16.	"Only the Fool Survives" (Edit)	Bettis, Omartian, Sudano, Summer, Weber, Falterlmeyer	4:00

== Personnel ==
- Donna Summer – lead vocals, backing vocals (9, as Adrian Gaines)
- Kevin Anderson – Synclavier (uncredited)
- Harold Faltermeyer – keyboards (1, 3–5, 7, 8), programming (1, 3–5, 7, 8)
- Randy Kerber – keyboards (2)
- Rick Chudacoff – synthesizer programming (2)
- Tom Seufert – synthesizer programming (2), drum programming (2)
- Steve Lindsey – acoustic piano (6), synthesizers (6), organ (6), drum programming (6)
- Howie Rice – clavinet (6)
- Stanley Clarke – clavinet concept (6)
- Brenda Russell – additional synthesizers (6), backing vocals (6)
- Larry Klein – additional synthesizer programming (6), fretless bass (6)
- David Tyson – keyboards (7), backing vocals (7)
- Jeff Lams – keyboards (9), programming (9)
- Bill Elliott – brass pads (9), programming (9), arrangements (9)
- Bill "Cosmo" Watts – programming (9)
- Wesley Plass – guitars (1)
- Dann Huff – guitars (2–5, 8)
- Paul Jackson Jr. – guitars (2)
- Donald Griffin – guitars (6)
- Eddie Schwartz – guitars (7)
- Randy Mitchell – guitars (9)
- Keith Nelson – bass (9)
- Peter Bunetta – drum programming (2)
- Paul Bahn – drums (9)
- Paulinho da Costa – percussion (2)
- Collyer Spreen – percussion (6)
- Terran "Terry" Santiel – additional percussion (6)
- Alex Acuña – percussion (9)
- Nathan Alford Jr. – tambourine (9)
- Kim Hutchcroft – baritone saxophone (2)
- Marc Russo – tenor saxophone (2)
- Warren Ham – soprano saxophone solo (9)
- Gary Grant – trumpet (2)
- Jerry Hey – trumpet (2), horn arrangements (2)
- Gary Herbig – clarinet (6)
- Dara Bernard – backing vocals (2, 9)
- Mary Gaines-Bernard – backing vocals (2, 9)
- Maxayn Lewis – backing vocals (2, 9)
- Susan Boyd – backing vocals (3, 4, 8)
- Siedah Garrett – backing vocals (3, 4, 8)
- Jon Joyce – backing vocals (3, 4, 7, 8)
- Edie Lehmann – backing vocals (3, 4, 8)
- Darryl Phinnessee – backing vocals (3)
- Joe Pizzulo – backing vocals (3, 4, 7)
- John Batdorf – backing vocals (4, 8)
- Mickey Thomas – lead vocals (5)
- Maxi Anderson – backing vocals (6)
- Bunny Hull – backing vocals (6)
- Joe Turano – backing vocals (6)
- Jim Haas – backing vocals (7)
- George Merrill – backing vocals (8)
- Mari Falcone – backing vocals (9)
- Gene Miller – backing vocals (9)

=== Production ===
- Harold Faltermeyer – producer (1, 3–5, 7, 8)
- Peter Bunetta – producer (2), arrangements (2)
- Rick Chudacoff – producer (2), arrangements (2)
- Richard Perry – producer (6)
- Brenda Russell – associate producer (6)
- Jeff Lams – producer (9)
- Keith Nelson – producer (9)
- Donna Summer – producer (9)
- Susan Munao – executive producer
- Larry Fishman – production coordinator
- Janet Levinson – art direction, design
- Tony Viramontes – album cover illustration, photography
- Michael Manoogian – hand tinting

Technical

- Dave Concors – engineer (1, 5, 7)
- Peter "Pit" Floss – engineer (1)
- Wesley Plass – engineer (1)
- Brian Reeves – engineer (1, 3, 5)
- Daren Klein – engineer (2)
- Glen Holguin – engineer (6), mixing (6)
- Larry Ferguson – engineer (9)
- Paul Lani – additional engineer (2)
- Steve Peck – additional engineer (6)
- Ken Felton – second engineer (6)
- Scott Maddox – second engineer (6)
- Craig Miller – second engineer (6)
- Harold Faltermeyer – mixing (1–5, 8, 9)
- Ulrich Rudolf – mixing (1–5, 8, 9), engineer (3, 4, 7, 8)
- Jim Tract – mixing (6)
- Stephen Marcussen – mastering at Precision Mastering (Hollywood, California).

== Charts ==
=== Weekly charts ===
Chart performance for All Systems Go
Chart (1987)	Peak position
Dutch Albums (Album Top 100)	72
European Top 100 Albums (Music & Media)	95
Italian Albums (Musica e dischi)	17
Japanese Albums (Oricon)	69
Swedish Albums (Sverigetopplistan)	27
US Billboard 200	122
US Top R&B/Hip-Hop Albums (Billboard)	53

=== Singles ===
Year	Single	Chart	Position
1987	"Dinner with Gershwin"	UK Singles Chart	13
1987	"Dinner with Gershwin"	US Billboard Hot 100	48
1987	"Dinner with Gershwin"	US Billboard Hot Black Singles	10
1987	"Dinner with Gershwin"	US Billboard Hot Dance Club Play	13
1987	"Dinner with Gershwin"	U.S. Billboard Hot Dance Music/Maxi-Singles Sales	16
1988	"All Systems Go"	UK Singles Chart	54
