= Only the Fool Survives =

Single by Donna Summer with Mickey Thomas

from the album All Systems Go
- B-side: "Love Shock"
- Released: November 16, 1987
- Studio: Oasis Studio
- Genre: Pop; soul; R&B
- Length: 4:42
- Label: Geffen
- Songwriter(s): Donna Summer; Bruce Sudano; Michael Omartian; Virgil Weber; John Bettis; Harold Faltermeyer
- Producer(s): Harold Faltermeyer

Donna Summer singles chronology
"Dinner with Gershwin" (1987)	"Only the Fool Survives" (1987)	"All Systems Go" (1988)

"Only the Fool Survives" is a duet song by American singer-songwriter Donna Summer and Mickey Thomas, lead singer of the band Starship (formerly Jefferson Starship). It was taken from Summer's thirteenth studio album, All Systems Go (1987). The song was written by Summer, her husband, Bruce Sudano, Michael Omartian, Virgil Weber, John Bettis, and its producer Harold Faltermeyer. It was released as the album's second single on November 16, 1987 by Geffen Records. The ballad was released as a single in North America and Japan.

== Track listing ==
7" - Geffen Records 9 28165-7

1. "Only the Fool Survives" – 4:00
2. "Love Shock" – 4:16

== Personnel ==
- Donna Summer – Vocals
- Mickey Thomas – Vocals
- Harold Faltermeyer – Keyboards, Programming, Mixing
- Dann Huff – Guitar
- Brian Reeves – Engineering
- Dave Concors – Engineering
- Uli Rudolf – Mixing

== Chart positions ==
Chart (1987)	Peak position
Canadian RPM Singles Chart	43
US Adult Contemporary (Billboard)	14
