= Rumour Has It (Donna Summer song) =

- German vinyl single picture sleeve

Single by Donna Summer

from the album Once Upon a Time
- B-side: Once Upon a Time" (UK): "A Man Like You" (Italy); "Now I Need You" (Germany)
- Released: March 28, 1978
- Studio: Musicland Studios (Munich, Germany)
- Genre: Disco
- Length: 4:57
- Label: Casablanca
- Songwriters: Donna Summer; Giorgio Moroder; Pete Bellotte
- Producers: Giorgio Moroder; Pete Bellotte

Donna Summer singles chronology
"Fairy Tale High" (1977)	"Rumour Has It" (1978)	"Back in Love Again" (1978)

"Rumour Has It" is a song by the American singer Donna Summer, released in 1978. It was a moderate hit, peaking at number 53 on the Billboard Hot 100, number 1 on the Hot Disco Chart in the US, number 19 on the UK Singles Chart, and number 20 in the Netherlands.

The song was originally featured on Summer's Once Upon a Time album, a concept album that tells the "fairytale" story of a girl's adventures as she goes from rags to riches. This song is found towards the end of the album, when the main character hears that someone is "looking for a girl like me" and hopes that the man in question is someone she has liked for some time. One of the verses in the original version was edited out for the 7" format. It is one of the earliest examples of disco, funk, rock, and electronica in pop culture. This was the second big hit in the UK from her Once Upon A Time album after "I Love You" and the song is most notable for its electronic suite on side 2, that influenced punk rock artists in the development of the 1980s new wave movement.

Record World said that the song is "in [Summer's] signature style."

== Chart positions ==
Chart (1978)	Peak position
Canadian RPM Top Singles	64
Germany (GfK)	21
Netherlands (Dutch Top 40)	22
Netherlands (Single Top 100)	20
UK (Official Charts Company)	19
US Billboard Hot 100	53
US Billboard Hot R&B Singles	21
