= Eyes (song) =

Single by Donna Summer

from the album Cats Without Claws
- B-side: "It's Not the Way"
- Released: May 14, 1985
- Studio: Lion Share Studios (Los Angeles); United Western Studios (Hollywood); Rhema Studio (Los Angeles)
- Genre: Pop rock; new wave; synth-pop
- Length: 4:45; 3:45 (Edit)
- Label: Warner Bros. (Europe)
- Songwriters: Donna Summer; Michael Omartian
- Producer: Michael Omartian

Donna Summer singles chronology
"Supernatural Love" (1984)	"Eyes" (1985)	"Dinner with Gershwin" (1987)

Official audio
- "Eyes" on YouTube

"Eyes" is a song by American pop singer Donna Summer, taken from her twelfth studio album Cats Without Claws (1984). The song as written by Summer and Michael Omartian and produced by the latter. It was released as the album's third and final single on May 14, 1985 by Warner Bros. Records (UK). Edited in length from the original version on the album and remixed by John "Jellybean" Benitez, the single peaked at No. 97 for one week in the UK singles chart.

A remix of the calypso-ish "I'm Free" from the Cats Without Claws album was included on the B-side of the UK release of the "Eyes" 12" single. "I'm Free" was performed by Summer and her back-up band on a Dick Clark's American Bandstand 1984 Christmas special, and Soul Train, indicating that the song had originally been intended to be the next single.

== Track listing ==
European 7"

1. "Eyes (Edit)" – 3:45
2. "It's Not the Way" – 4:22

UK 12"

1. "Eyes (Extended Mix)" – 6:58 (Remixed by John "Jellybean" Benitez)
2. "I'm Free" – 6:18 (Remixed by John "Jellybean" Benitez)
3. "It's Not the Way" – 4:22

German 12"

1. "Eyes (Extended Mix)" – 6:58 (Remixed by John "Jellybean" Benitez)
2. "It's Not the Way" – 4:22
