= Supernatural Love =

Single by Donna Summer

from the album Cats Without Claws
- B-side: "Face The Music"
- Released: October 23, 1984
- Recorded: 1984
- Studio: Lion Share Studios, Los Angeles; United Western Studios, Hollywood; Rhema Studio, Los Angeles
- Genre: Rock, post-disco
- Length: 3:38
- Label: Geffen (US), Warner Bros. Records (Europe)
- Songwriters: Donna Summer, Michael Omartian, Bruce Sudano
- Producer: Michael Omartian

Donna Summer singles chronology
"There Goes My Baby" (1984)	"Supernatural Love" (1984)	"Eyes" (1985)

"Supernatural Love" is the second single from Donna Summer's twelfth studio album, Cats Without Claws (1984). The song was released on October 23, 1984 by Geffen Records (US) and Warner Bros. Records (UK). It was written by Summer, Michael Omartian and Bruce Sudano, and produced by Omartian. The typically 1980s synthesized song was remixed for its release as a single and became a minor hit in the US. It was accompanied by a very colourful video again featuring Donna and husband Bruce Sudano as a star-crossed couple chasing each other through time when he is abducted by an enchantress—from the stone age into current 1980s New Wave, where Donna pursues the enchantress in order to save him. The edited remix done by Juergen Koppers was used in the video. The music video was released in high definition on YouTube on April 17, 2025.

The single peaked at #75 on the US Billboard Hot 100 chart, and #39 on the US Billboard Hot Dance Club Play chart.

== Track listing ==
US 7"

1. "Supernatural Love (Remix)" – 3:38
2. "Face the Music" – 4:14

European 7"

1. "Supernatural Love (Remix)" – 3:38
2. "Suzanna" – 4:29

US 12"

1. "Supernatural Love (Extended Dance Remix)" – 6:12 (Remixed by Juergen Koppers)
2. "Face the Music" – 4:14

European 12"

1. "Supernatural Love (UK Extended Dance Remix)" – 6:12 (Remixed by Juergen Koppers / UK Remix is slightly different)
2. "Suzanna" – 4:29

== Chart positions ==
Chart (1984)	Peak position
U.S. Billboard Hot 100	75
U.S. Billboard Hot Dance Club Play	39
U.S. Billboard Hot R&B/Hip-Hop Songs	51
