= All Systems Go (song) =

Single by Donna Summer

from the album All Systems Go
- B-side: "Bad Reputation"
- Released: January 18, 1988
- Studio: Oasis Studio, Munich; Union Studio, Munich
- Genre: Pop rock
- Length: 4:10; 3:50 (Edit)
- Label: Geffen (U.S.); Warner Bros. (Europe)
- Songwriters: Donna Summer, Harold Faltermeyer
- Producer: Harold Faltermeyer

Donna Summer singles chronology
"Only the Fool Survives" (1987)	"All Systems Go" (1988)	"This Time I Know It's for Real" (1989)

"All Systems Go" is the third single from American singer-songwriter Donna Summer's thirteenth album of the same name (1987). Edited from its original album version, it became a minor hit in the United Kingdom, where it reached #54 on the UK Singles Chart.

== Critical reception ==
Jerry Smith from Music Week wrote, "Nowhere near as compulsive as her "Dinner with Gershwin" hit, but this, the title track from her latest album, written and produced by Harold Faltermeyer, does have a certain naggingly quality to it." Tom Hibbert from Smash Hits constated that "this woman can sing like a dream", commenting further that "this may not be her finest moment (that was "State of Independence", the greatest record ever made) but it's completely fab nonetheless, a crisp and swinging pop tune with admirably absurd references to outer space. Bravo, as they say, madam."

== Track listing ==
- 7" single

A. "All Systems Go" (Edit) - 3:50
B. "Bad Reputation" - 4:22

- 12" single

A. "All Systems Go" (Extended Remix) - 8:03
B1. "All Systems Go" (Edit) - 3:50
B2. "Bad Reputation" - 4:22

== Charts ==
Chart (1988)	Peak position
UK Singles (OCC)	54

== Personnel ==
- Donna Summer - Vocals
- Harold Faltermeyer - Producer, Keyboards, Programming, Mixing
- Wesley Plass - Guitar
- Brian Reeves, Dave Concors, Wesley Plass, Pit Floss - Engineering
- Uli Rudolf - Mixing
- Tony Viramontes - Single cover photography
