= Melody of Love (Wanna Be Loved) =

1994 single by Donna Summer

Single by Donna Summer

from the album Endless Summer: Donna Summer's Greatest Hits
- Released: October 31, 1994
- Genre: Pop; disco; house
- Length: 4:16
- Label: Mercury; Casablanca
- Songwriters: Donna Summer; David Cole; Robert Clivillés; Joe Carrano
- Producers: Donna Summer; Welcome Productions

Donna Summer singles chronology
"Carry On" (1992)	"Melody of Love (Wanna Be Loved)" (1994)	"Any Way At All" (1994)

Music video
- "Melody of Love (Wanna Be Loved)" on YouTube

"Melody of Love (Wanna Be Loved)" is a song by American singer and songwriter Donna Summer. It was released on October 31, 1994, by Mercury and Casablanca Records as a new track and the lead single for her 1994 hits compilation album, Endless Summer: Donna Summer's Greatest Hits. The song was written by Summer, David Cole, Robert Clivillés and Joe Carrano, and produced by Summer and Welcome Productions. It just missed the top 20 in the United Kingdom and was a top-40 hit in Belgium. The song was formed with several remixes and was her tenth number-one hit on the US Billboard Hot Dance Club Songs chart. In Australia, the single peaked at number 79 in December 1994. It was awarded the ASCAP Dance Song of the Year prize in 1996.

== Critical reception ==
Alex Henderson from AllMusic complimented Summer, that "still sounds incredibly fresh" on the song. Larry Flick from Billboard magazine stated that it "proves that her voice is stronger now than ever. She soars with spine-tingling power over a pop-house arrangement that nicks an idea or two from several of her vintage disco hits, while injecting a modern house sensibility that ensures active club exposure." In a separate review, Flick added that "it places Summer at the center of a swirling, disco-soaked house arrangement", noting that "the simple but oh-so-sweet tune gallops at a hearty and insinuating pace". In his weekly UK chart commentary, James Masterton described it as a "rather anodyne piece of disco". Pan-European magazine Music & Media remarked that co-written by David Cole and Robert Clivillés, "Summer returns to '70s disco which first made her famous. Vocally taking untenable hurdles, she could be Whitney's twin sis."

Alan Jones from Music Week gave the song a score of four out of five, commenting, "Simple piano chords and muted horns usher in Donna's first for a while, but it's just the calm before the storm, as the song explodes in contemporary house style, with pumping bass and her extraordinary voice as durable as ever." Andy Beevers from the Record Mirror Dance Update gave it a full score of five out of five, stating that the disco veteran "returns in fine style". Another Record Mirror editor, James Hamilton, named it a "typical vintage style but apparently brand new David Cole co-composed song" in his weekly dance column. Jordan Paramor from Smash Hits opined that 'Melody of Love' "begins as a lurvely ballad, but blink and it's metamorphosed into another boppy bundle of disco pap."

== Music video ==
A music video was produced to promote the single, directed by South African director and writer Ralph Ziman. It features Summer in a black dress singing the song and dancing on a balcony. There are musical notes disclaimed under the song's lyrics throughout the video. Other scenes show four dancing men, accompanied with saxophonists, pianist and violinists. David Morales’ Classic Club Radio Edit was used in the video.

== Track listings ==
- UK CD single
1. "Melody of Love (Wanna Be Loved)" (Épris Mix) – 8:33
2. "Melody of Love (Wanna Be Loved)" (AJ Humpty's Mix) – 8:46
3. "Melody of Love (Wanna Be Loved)" (Mijangos Powertools Trip #1) – 5:55
4. "Melody of Love (Wanna Be Loved)" (Classic Club Mix) – 8:04
- US & Australian CD maxi-single
1. "Melody of Love (Wanna Be Loved)" (Original Version) – 4:16
2. "Melody of Love (Wanna Be Loved)" (Classic Club Mix) – 8:03
3. "Melody of Love (Wanna Be Loved)" (Boss Mix) – 6:58
4. "Melody of Love (Wanna Be Loved)" (Épris Mix) – 8:33
5. "Melody of Love (Wanna Be Loved)" (AJ & Humpty's Anthem Mix) – 8:46
6. "Melody of Love (Wanna Be Loved)" (Épris Radio Mix) – 4:14
7. "On the Radio" – 5:50
8. "The Christmas Song (Chestnuts Roasting on an Open Fire)" – 4:20

== Charts ==
=== Weekly charts ===
Weekly chart performance for "Melody of Love (Wanna Be Loved)"
Chart (1994)	Peak position
Australia (ARIA)	79
Belgium (Ultratop 50 Flanders)	35
Europe (Eurochart Hot 100)	79
Europe (European Dance Radio)	3
Europe (European Hit Radio)	32
Greece (Pop + Rock)	17
Netherlands (Dutch Top 40 Tipparade)	3
Netherlands (Dutch Single Tip)	5
Scotland (OCC)	24
UK Singles (Official Charts)	21
UK Airplay (Music Week)	21
UK Club Chart (Music Week)	1
US Dance Club Songs (Billboard)	1
US Hot Dance Music/Maxi-Singles Sales (Billboard)	5

=== Year-end charts ===
1994 year-end chart performance for "Melody of Love (Wanna Be Loved)"
Chart (1994)	Position
UK Club Chart (Music Week)	8

1995 year-end chart performance for "Melody of Love (Wanna Be Loved)"
Chart (1995)	Position
US Dance Club Play Songs (Billboard)	1

== See also ==
- List of number-one dance singles of 1995 (U.S.)
