= Love's About to Change My Heart =

Single by Donna Summer

from the album Another Place and Time
- B-side: "Love's About to Change My Heart" (Instrumental)
- Released: August 14, 1989
- Studio: PWL (London, England)
- Length: 4:03 (album version); 3:45 (PWL 7-inch remix)
- Label: Atlantic (US); Warner Bros. (Europe)
- Songwriters: Matt Aitken; Mike Stock; Pete Waterman
- Producer: Stock Aitken Waterman

Donna Summer singles chronology
| "I Don't Wanna Get Hurt" (1989) | "Love's About to Change My Heart" (1989) | "Breakaway" (1989) |

Music video
- "Love's About to Change My Heart" on YouTube

"Love's About to Change My Heart" is the third single from American singer Donna Summer's 14th studio album, Another Place and Time (1989). The song was released on August 14, 1989, by Atlantic Records and Warner Bros. Records. It was written and produced by British production team Stock Aitken & Waterman. Released as the second single in the US, the song was a number-three hit on the Billboard Dance Club Play chart.

In contemporary interviews, Summer described the track as one of her favorite cuts; tying only with "Breakaway" as the best from the LP. The late singer's husband, Bruce Sudano, said that both he and Summer were very enthusiastic about the track because of its quality, her powerful vocal performance, and the song's deference to her strongest work with Giorgio Moroder, saying, "It's a full showcase on every level".

== Critical reception ==
When reviewing the single, Stephen Duffy of Record Mirror simply wrote: "Not as good as Kylie and that's a terrible thing to say...", which refers to his review of Cliff Richard's "I Just Don't Have the Heart" (on the same page) in which he stated the same thing and asked: "How will he moonwalk to this?" In the same magazine, the Civillés & Cole 12" mix was praised by James Hamilton, considering that this "vastly superior 0-124 bpm remix turns [Summer's] most recent, rather limp, Stock Aitken Waterman creation into a superb solidly bounding and soaring stormer in the classic "disco" style of a decade ago".

Retrospectively, in a 2016 review of the album, Pop Rescue stated that "Love's About to Change My Heart" "opens sounding a bit like a Whitney Houston 80s song, before absolutely roaring into a hi-NRG bass/keyboards/beats track", and added positively that "Donna's vocals sit confidently on top of this, and at times it gives a wonderful nod to her disco era". In 2019, James Masterton wrote that "Love's About to Change My Heart" is "a brooding mid-tempo track. Summer's vocals wound themselves subtly around the melody, reaching for a gospel-inspired climax that in truth never quite arrived in the expected manner". In 2020, Daniel Griffiths of musicradar.com wrote that "this ever-building homage to Summer's own cake-anthem MacArthur Park is our cream of the crop". In 2021, British magazine Classic Pop ranked the song number 24 in their list of 'Top 40 Stock Aitken Waterman songs', calling it a "sumptuous" single from Another Place and Time and expressing sadness about its commercial failure in the United States.

== Chart performance ==
In the US, "Love's About to Change My Heart" peaked at number 85 on the Billboard Hot 100. Despite the lack of chart success in the US, it was a solid top 20 hit in the UK and it became a favorite among Donna Summer fans due to her strong vocal performance and the fact that it had a slow beginning, reminiscent of several of Summer's disco hits of the 1970s, during which time she was the most successful female of that genre.

The song was remixed from its original album version for release as a single. Notably the European single remix was different from the one found in the US. It reached number three on the Billboard Dance Club Play chart and number 20 on the UK Singles Chart. The video was directed by Dieter Trattmann.

== Cover versions ==
The song was covered by Spanish singer Mónica Naranjo in her debut album. She made a Spanish-language version called "Fuego de pasión".

== Track listings ==
- UK 7-inch single
1. "Love's About to Change My Heart (Edit)" - 3:47
2. "Love's About to Change My Heart (Instrumental)" - 3:47
- UK 12-inch single / UK CD
1. "Love's About to Change My Heart (Extended Remix)" – 6:23
2. "Love's About to Change My Heart (Instrumental)" – 5:10
3. "Jeremy" - 4:40
- UK second 12-inch single
1. "Love's About to Change My Heart (Clivilles & Cole 12-inch Mix)" – 7:40
2. "Love's About to Change My Heart (Dub 2)" – 7:10
3. "Love's About to Change My Heart (Clivilles & Cole 7-inch Mix)" – 4:20
- US 12-inch single (Atlantic 0-86309)
1. "Love's About to Change My Heart (PWL 12-inch Mix)" - 6:23
2. "Love's About to Change My Heart (PWL 7-inch Mix)" - 3:45
3. "Love's About to Change My Heart (Clivillés & Cole 12-inch Mix)" - 7:40
4. "Love's About to Change My Heart (Dub)" - 7:10
5. "Love's About to Change My Heart (Clivillés & Cole 7-inch Mix)" - 4:20

== Charts ==
Weekly chart performance for "Love's About to Change My Heart"
| Chart (1989) | Peak position |
|---|---|
| Australia (ARIA) | 71 |
| Belgium (Ultratop Flanders) | 33 |
| Europe (Eurochart Hot 100) (Music & Media) | 68 |
| Finland (Suomen virallinen lista) | 14 |
| Ireland (IRMA) | 11 |
| Luxembourg (Radio Luxembourg) | 18 |
| Netherlands (Single Top 100) | 59 |
| Netherlands (Dutch Top 40 Tipparade) | 3 |
| UK (OCC) | 20 |
| UK Dance (Music Week) | 14 |
| US Billboard Hot 100 | 85 |
| US Dance Club Play (Billboard) | 3 |
