= Another Place and Time =

Studio album by Donna Summer
- Released: March 13, 1989
- Recorded: September 1988–January 1989
- Studio: PWL Studios (London)
- Genres: Disco; Eurodance; Europop
- Length: 37:36
- Label: Atlantic/Warner Bros.
- Producer: Stock Aitken Waterman

Donna Summer chronology
All Systems Go (1987)	Another Place and Time (1989)	Mistaken Identity (1991)

Singles from Another Place and Time
- 1. "This Time I Know It's for Real" Released: February 13, 1989; 2. "I Don't Wanna Get Hurt" Released: May 8, 1989 (UK); 3. "Love's About to Change My Heart" Released: August 14, 1989; 4. "Breakaway" Released: October 1989; 5. "When Love Takes Over You" Released: November 13, 1989 (UK)

Another Place and Time is the fourteenth studio album by American singer-songwriter Donna Summer, released on March 13, 1989, by Atlantic Records and Warner Bros. Records. The album was produced by the successful British production team Stock Aitken Waterman (S/A/W), known for their signature 1980s synthpop sound.

The collaboration between Summer and S/A/W was suggested by her husband, Bruce Sudano, after hearing a track by Rick Astley, another artist produced by the team. While initially hesitant, Summer eventually embraced their commercial approach, recording the album between September 1988 and January 1989 at PWL Studios in London. The collaboration marked a shift in Summer's career after she had explored various musical styles throughout the 1980s with Geffen Records.

The album's lead single, "This Time I Know It's for Real", achieved significant success worldwide, reaching number seven on the Billboard Hot 100 in the United States—where it was her last top 40 hit—and number three on the UK Singles Chart. Despite its international popularity, Geffen Records refused to release the album in the US, prompting Summer to find a new label. Atlantic Records eventually released Another Place and Time in the US in April 1989.

== Production and background ==
After enjoying immense stardom during the disco era in the 1970s, Summer had experimented with different styles of music during the 1980s and released several albums with Geffen Records with varied results; Geffen had refused to release much of her material including her biggest post-1970s success, the 1983 album She Works Hard for the Money, which had only been released by virtue of being given to another label—Mercury Records—to satisfy a legal obligation between Summer and her 1970s label Casablanca Records.

Summer's 1987 album All Systems Go would prove to be her final release on Geffen, although she recorded Another Place and Time while contracted to Geffen Records.

In 1987, while Summer and her husband Bruce Sudano were visiting the south of France, Sudano heard a Rick Astley track and was moved to suggest that Summer would be well-served by a collaboration with Stock Aitken Waterman (aka S/A/W), the songwriting and production team behind Astley.

S/A/W had in the mid-1980s established themselves as the undisputed masters of the UK Singles Chart, with the signature S/A/W "hit factory" sound—basically their own brand of 1980s synthpop/dance—translating into post-disco dance hits for such acts as Astley, Bananarama, and Kylie Minogue.

Sudano evidently shared the opinion of Record Mirror critic Edward J Bernard, who reviewing Donna Summer's All Systems Go album in October 1987, opined: "Now disco's back in vogue, Donna would be better served teaming up with S/A/W – her powerhouse lungs were made for just that kind of [over-the-top] production, and not the wimp rock she now chooses to make."

Although Summer herself became a fan of Astley's, the idea of a Donna Summer/ S/A/W collaboration apparently remained dormant until 1989, when Sudano and Pete Waterman of S/A/W crossed paths at the Pool Bar & Café at the Beverly Wilshire Hotel, Waterman being on an American promo junket with Astley.

Waterman was receptive to Sudano's suggestion of S/A/W teaming with Donna Summer: (Pete Waterman quote:)"I was a fan [who had] bought her records". Waterman had met Summer in 1974 at Munich when he was an Magnet Records A&R man and she was a session singer who passed on Waterman's invitation to become a vocalist for Silver Convention, opting instead to record with Giorgio Moroder.

"When Donna Summer first started working with us, I [recall mutual] culture shock... We had never worked with a singer of Donna's ability, & certainly Donna had never worked with three songwriters who were more formulaic or specific about the task at hand. At first there was some friction as [both parties] tried to bridge the gap, but Donna soon understood that our squabbles were a way of achieving a final result. We [soon learned] that Donna had the ability to take what had been written, go behind the microphone & take it three times further than anything we had [envisioned]. [UltimatelyAnother Place And Time] stands as one of the most enjoyable [albums] we ever recorded, & part of our hi-NRG history, thanks to Donna's astounding ability to make any song she sang her own."

— Pete Waterman of S/A/W on working with Donna Summer on Another Place & Time.

Summer would say of the Another Place and Time album, recorded between September 1988 and January 1989 with S/A/W at PWL Studios in London, "There was no real themes we were looking for, except for dancing, love and relationships. The rest was the result of the collaboration between the producers and myself. The results were exactly what we were hoping for."

After some initial tensions over the direction of the recording sessions, the singer agreed to let SAW take the lead in the studio when Waterman convinced her the team knew what they were doing and would deliver her a hit.

Summer would refer to S/A/W as "very commercial-minded, much more than I am. [But] there's a time you need to be commercial...: to sell records, enough to be on a label. You need somebody to kind of monitor your sense of creativity." "Maybe [S/A/W are] formularized in terms of what works in the marketplace, but I feel that everyone has a formula...I've never seen producers who work harder than these three guys".

Mike Stock of S/A/W would recall of working with Summer: "I was excited to work with Donna Summer simply because of her superb vocal ability...She had a magic to her that few artists have. I’d sing her my song, she’d learn it, then she’d sing it back with whistles and bells and all sorts of things going on. She had that skill and feel for music."

The S/A/W team wrote all ten of the tracks for their collaboration with Summer, with the singer having co-writing credit on three tracks. The lead single from the S/A/W Donna Summer album, "This Time I Know It's for Real", was released in the United Kingdom—the focal point of S/A/W's success—on 13 February 1989, its release being not on Geffen Records but rather on Warner Bros. Records, which was Summer's label outside of the US.

Debuting on the UK Singles Chart dated 25 February 1989 at number 42, "This Time I Know It's for Real" reached number three in March 1989, in the same month that Another Place and Time was released in Britain and continental Europe, where its lead single also became a top-ten hit. However Summer's international success came too late and/or failed to impress her American label Geffen Records, as Summer explained: "David [Geffen] said he didn't like the album. He said he wasn't going to put it out and I could sue him if I wanted to. I thought...great, then I'll go [elsewhere]." (According to Summer, she had asked to Geffen several years earlier to cancel her contract and the label had refused.)

Reportedly Another Place and Time began selling as an import in the US where record companies began bidding for the album's American distribution rights: Summer at the time had no management and had to herself (with an attorney's assistance) negotiate for a US label deal for the release of Another Place and Time, with Atlantic finally releasing the album in the US in April 1989.

== Critical reception ==
Professional ratings
Review scores
Source	Rating
AllMusic	4/5 stars
Robert Christgau	B+
Number One	1/5 stars

The album received mixed reviews. It was lauded by Barry Walters of the San Francisco Examiner as "easily [Summer's] best LP of new work since 1979's Bad Girls. Every track sounds like a hit" Similarly, Bill Coleman of Billboard considered Another Place and Time as "one of Summer's most satisfying and consistent [album] in a very long time", adding that "the delicious dance/pop numbers do serve as nice vehicles for the songstress' vocal charm", and that Summer "sounds very comfortable with the material and all of the tracks are easily programmable for clubs and radio".

However, Another Place and Time generally underwhelmed critics at the time of its release, the reaction of Robin Smith of Record Mirror: "Donna's latest album comes across rather like a selection of reheated Kylie [Minogue] out-takes. Her voice has been over-diluted for mass radio-friendly appeal, and she's lost the fire of her early days", and Gary Graff of the Detroit Free Press: "Once sultry and soulful, Summer has been whitewashed to sound like any other female hit-maker, a disturbing fate for one of America's dance-music trendsetters," being echoed by Steve Simels of Stereo Review:

"Summer's [vintage] records...at least bore the stamp of a recognizable personality. Unfortunately, this comeback effort finds her in the ham-fisted grasp of British producer/writers Stock, Aitken, and Waterman, the last place any artist with even a shred of individuality should be. S/A/W run a well-oiled hit factory, and while there's no doubting the guys' commercial acumen, there's also no doubting that all their songs and all their records sound alike. Summer doesn't exactly get buried [here]; in fact, her genuine soulfulness occasionally threatens to inject a measure of reality into S/A/W's cotton-candy disco settings...Mostly, though, the album is lyrically banal (sometimes amazingly so), annoyingly clean-cut, and ultimately indistinguishable from previous S/A/W product."

Retrospective assessments of Another Place and Time have been more positive. Alex Henderson of AllMusic praised the album, stating that it was "an excellent CD" and "one of the best albums that Summer provided in the '80s", rating "Whatever Your Heart Desires," "I Don't Wanna Get Hurt" and "This Time I Know It's for Real" as "exuberant, club-friendly Euro-dance/Hi-NRG gems". In July 2018, Mark Elliot of Classic Pop underlined "Summer's impeccable delivery", considered Another Place and Time as "a pop masterpiece" which he ranked as the best album ever produced by Stock Aitken Waterman.

== Commercial performance ==
The UK chart success of the album's lead single "This Time I Know It's for Real"—Summer's first UK top-ten hit since 1979 when her Barbra Streisand duet "No More Tears (Enough Is Enough)" reached number three—was paralleled by similar chart success in France, Germany, Ireland, Italy, the Netherlands, Norway and Sweden.

The single's success afforded its parent album a UK chart debut of number 17 the week ending 25 March 1989, and although Another Place and Time would be unable to best its debut position the album would set a longevity record for the UK chart tenure of any Donna Summer album at 28 weeks, 17 of them in the top 50.

The UK chart tenure of Another Place and Time would occur in two segments, as after dropping from the top 100 album chart in July 1989 after 18 charting weeks the album re-entered in September 1989 to again rise as high as number 17. Reportedly Another Place and Time became Summer's first gold-certified album since 1979.

In its US release Another Place and Time yielded a top-ten hit single, Summer's first since "She Works Hard for the Money" in 1983, in "This Time I Know It's for Real". While Another Place and Time yielded a second top-ten hit, "I Don't Wanna Get Hurt", in the UK—where a third single, "Love's About to Change My Heart", would reach number 20—"This Time I Know It's for Real" would be the album's only major hit single in the US. "I Don't Wanna Get Hurt" was passed over for single release there in favor of "Love's About to Change My Heart", whose Hot 100 peak would be number 85 and reflected a lack of sustained interest in the album.

== Planned follow-up album and re-release ==
A second album was planned with Stock Aitken Waterman, however Summer never found the time to get back to the UK, and the tracks were later recorded by singer Lonnie Gordon.

In 2014, the album was re-released in the UK in a 3-CD deluxe edition as well as digital downloads, containing a remastered original album, plus extended versions, original versions and remixes.

In 2019, the album was reissued for its 30th anniversary as a 3-CD deluxe edition, a 2LP red/silver vinyl edition as well as digital downloads, containing the original studio album and a large selection of extra singles mixes, 6 unreleased mixes and 2 anniversary megamixes.

== Track listing ==
Standard edition

All tracks are written by Mike Stock, Matt Aitken and Pete Waterman, except where noted.

Side one
No.	Title	Writer(s)	Length
1.	"I Don't Wanna Get Hurt"		3:28
2.	"When Love Takes Over You"		4:13
3.	"This Time I Know It's for Real"	Stock, Aitken, Waterman, Summer	3:38
4.	"The Only One"		3:55
5.	"In Another Place and Time"		3:22

Side two
No.	Title	Writer(s)	Length
1.	"Sentimental"	Stock, Aitken, Waterman, Summer	3:11
2.	"Whatever Your Heart Desires"	Stock, Aitken, Waterman, Summer	3:52
3.	"Breakaway"		4:04
4.	"If It Makes You Feel Good"		3:45
5.	"Love's About to Change My Heart"		4:03

CD+Graphics Edition CD+G

In 1989 an enhanced CD+Graphics version of the album was also released. Identified with the word graphics under the compact disc logo printed on the CD and a distinctive long case compared to the standard CD case. CD+Graphics, often shortened to CD+G or CDG featured additional coding within the CD data that played as a normal CD but could also be read by CD based computer systems such as the Philips CD-i. When played back additional 8-bit graphic based visual media could then be displayed on a connected TV screen sequenced with the music being played. Although several artists released CDG versions of their albums including Fleetwood Mac and Anita Baker the CDG format never took off. It found popularity as the basis for karaoke systems and is still used today. The CDG versions were made in relatively small numbers which makes them very rare and they have become collectibles as a result.

3xCD Deluxe Edition (2014)

Disc one retains the same track listing as the original release.

Disc two
No.	Title	Writer(s)	Length
1.	"Breakaway (Power Radio Mix)"		4:02
2.	"Breakaway (Extended Power Mix)"		6:08
3.	"Breakaway (Remix – Full Version)"		6:45
4.	"Breakaway (Remix Edit)"		3:37
5.	"Breakaway (Instrumental Remix Edit)"		3:45
6.	"I Don't Wanna Get Hurt (12" Version)"		6:58
7.	"I Don't Wanna Get Hurt (Instrumental)"		4:45
8.	"I Don't Wanna Get Hurt (7" Remix)"		3:32
9.	"I Don't Wanna Get Hurt (Pete Hammond Original 12" Mix)"		7:22
10.	"If It Makes You Feel Good (Pete Hammond Remix Instrumental)"		4:06
11.	"Sentimental (Instrumental)"	Stock, Aitken, Waterman, Summer	3:12
12.	"This Time I Know It's for Real (Extended Remix)"	Stock, Aitken, Waterman, Summer	7:21
13.	"This Time I Know It's for Real (Instrumental)"	Stock, Aitken, Waterman, Summer	3:33

Disc three
No.	Title	Writer(s)	Length
1.	"When Love Takes Over You (Dave Ford 7")"		3:38
2.	"When Love Takes Over You (Dave Ford Extended Remix)"		6:13
3.	"When Love Takes Over You (Dave Ford Instrumental)"		3:37
4.	"When Love Takes Over You (Pete Hammond Original 12" Mix)"		7:02
5.	"The Only One (Instrumental)"		3:54
6.	"Whatever Your Heart Desires (Instrumental)"	Stock, Aitken, Waterman, Summer	3:57
7.	"Love's About to Change My Heart (Clivillés & Cole 12" Mix)"		7:47
8.	"Love's About to Change My Heart (Clivillés & Cole 7" Mix)"		4:21
9.	"Love's About to Change My Heart (Extended Remix)"		6:19
10.	"Love's About to Change My Heart (PWL Instrumental)"		5:14
11.	"Love's About to Change My Heart (Clivillés & Cole Love Dub)"		7:13
12.	"Love's About to Change My Heart (Dub)"		8:20
13.	"Love's About to Change My Heart (Loveland's Full-On 7" Radio Edit)"		3:59
14.	"Love's About to Change My Heart (PWL 7" Mix)"		3:45

3xCD 30th Anniversary Deluxe Edition • Unreleased Mixes • Anniversary Megamixes (2019)

Disc one retains the same track listing as the original release.

Disc two
No.	Title	Writer(s)	Length
1.	"This Time I Know It's For Real (7" Single Mix)"		3:32
2.	"Breakaway (Power Radio Mix)"		4:03
3.	"I Don't Wanna Get Hurt (7" Remix)"		3:31
4.	"Love's About To Change My Heart (PWL 7" Mix)"		3:45
5.	"When Love Takes Over You (Mixmaster Dave Ford 7")"		3:37
6.	"Breakaway (Remix - Edit)"		3:35
7.	"I Don't Wanna Get Hurt (12" Version)"		6:59
8.	"Love's About To Change My Heart (Extended Remix)"		6:18
9.	"When Love Takes Over You (Mixmaster Dave Ford Extended Remix)"		6:14
10.	"Breakaway (Remix - Full Version)"		6:44
11.	"Love's About To Change My Heart (Loveland's Full-On 12" Vocal)"		7:42
12.	"Whatever Your Heart Desires (Extended Club Mix)"	Stock, Aitken, Waterman, Summer	8:18
13.	"The 30th Anniversary Minimix"		6:16

Disc three
No.	Title	Writer(s)	Length
1.	"Love's About To Change My Heart (Loveland's Full-On 7" Radio Edit)"		4:00
2.	"If It Makes You Feel Good (Dave Ford Album Master)"		3:17
3.	"Sentimental (Album Long Master)"	Stock, Aitken, Waterman, Summer	3:32
4.	"Love's About To Change My Heart (7" Long Remix)"		5:02
5.	"This Time I Know It's For Real (Extended Remix)"	Stock, Aitken, Waterman, Summer	7:22
6.	"Breakaway (Extended Power Mix)"		6:09
7.	"I Don't Wanna Get Hurt (Pete Hammond Original 12" Mix)"		7:22
8.	"Love's About To Change My Heart (Clivillés & Cole 12" Mix)"		7:47
9.	"When Love Takes Over You (Pete Hammond Original 12" Mix)"		7:03
10.	"If It Makes You Feel Good (Extended Feelgood Mix)"		6:44
11.	"Love's About To Change My Heart (12" Remix)"		7:11
12.	"The 30th Anniversary Megamix"		12:15

2xLP Red/Silver Vinyl 30th Anniversary Deluxe Edition (2019)

LP one retains the same track listing as the original release.

LP two
No.	Title	Length
1.	"Breakaway [extended power mix]"
2.	"Love’s About To Change My Heart [Loveland’s Full-On 12″ Vocal]"
3.	"When Love Takes Over You [Pete Hammond Original 12″ Mix]"
4.	"This Time I Know It’s For Real [7″ Single Mix]"
5.	"When Love Takes Over You [Mixmaster Dave Ford 7″]"
6.	"Breakaway [Power Radio Mix]"
7.	"Love’s About To Change My Heart [PWL 7″ Mix]"
8.	"I Don’t Wanna Get Hurt [Pete Hammond Original 12″ Mix]"
9.	"The 30th Anniversary Minimix"

== Personnel ==
- Donna Summer – vocals
- Mike Stock – keyboards, backing vocals
- Matt Aitken – keyboards, guitars
- George De Angelis – keyboards
- A. Linn – drums
- Dee Lewis – backing vocals
- Mae McKenna – backing vocals

=== Production ===
- Stock, Aitken & Waterman – producers, arrangements
- Karen Hewitt – engineer
- Boyowa "Yoyo" Olugbo – engineer
- "Mixmaster" Pete Hammond – mixing
- Recorded at PWL Studios (London)
- Donna's vocals were recorded using the Calrec Soundfield Microphone.
- Lawrence Lawry – photography, front cover concept
- David Howells – design
- Donna Summer – front cover concept
- Andrene (at Vidal Sassoon) – hair
- Richard Sharpes – makeup
- Kelly Cooper – styling

== Charts ==
=== Weekly charts ===
Weekly chart performance for Another Place and Time
Chart (1989)	Peak position
Australian Albums (ARIA)	93
Canada Top Albums/CDs (RPM)	62
Dutch Albums (Album Top 100)	29
European Albums (Music & Media)	40
Finnish Albums (Suomen virallinen lista)	15
French Albums (SNEP)	26
German Albums (Offizielle Top 100)	49
Italian Albums (Musica e dischi)	24
Japanese Albums (Oricon)	92
Swedish Albums (Sverigetopplistan)	16
Swiss Albums (Schweizer Hitparade)	23
UK Albums (Official Charts)	17
US Billboard 200	53
US Cashbox Top Albums	47

=== Year-end charts ===
Year-end chart performance for Another Place and Time
Chart (1989)	Position
European Albums (Music & Media)	98

== Certifications and sales ==
Certifications for Another Place and Time
Region	Certification	Certified units/sales
United Kingdom (BPI)	Gold	100,000^{^}
^{^} Shipments figures based on certification alone.
