= When Love Cries =

1991 song by Donna Summer

Single by Donna Summer

from the album Mistaken Identity
- Released: August 12, 1991
- Genre: Soul; new jack swing
- Length: 5:15
- Label: Atlantic (United States); Warner Bros. (Europe)
- Songwriters: Donna Summer; Keith Diamond; Paul Chiten; Anthony Smith; Larry Henley; Neil Thomas
- Producer: Keith Diamond

Donna Summer singles chronology
"When Love Takes Over You" (1989)	"When Love Cries" (1991)	"Work That Magic" (1991)

"When Love Cries" is a song by American singer-songwriter Donna Summer, released on August 12, 1991 as the first single from her fifteenth studio album, Mistaken Identity (1991). The song was written by Summer, Keith Diamond, Paul Chiten, Anthony Smith, Neil Thomas and Larry Henley, and produced by Diamond. It was released by Atlantic Records in the United States and by Warner Bros. in Europe. The song peaked at number 77 on the US Billboard Hot 100 and number 18 on the Billboard R&B chart. It would also turn out to be Summer's final single to reach the R&B chart in the United States. Despite being the lead single for her new album and its relative success, there was no music video made for the song.

== Critical reception ==
Larry Flick from Billboard magazine wrote, "Fans of legendary disco diva's signature club sound had better brace themselves. Summer not only unveils a new blond look, but also a surprisingly low-key, down-tempo R&B tune. Though not an immediate grabber, slinky nouveau soul/swing sound ultimately scores thanks to her incomparable vocals." Another Billboard editor stated that the song, with the other tunes of the album, "showcase Summer's strongest vocals to date."

Henderson and DeVaney from Cashbox described it as a "smooth R&B/pop single". Marisa Fox from Entertainment Weekly called it a "lushly orchestrated" single, noting that Summer's "fiery vocals sizzle over a seductive, down-tempo club beat". Pan-European magazine Music & Media commented, "The grande dame of disco in the '70s has always updated her style, and again she keeps up with the trend. This new effort with a fashionable '90s' beat-selected from the album Mistaken Identity—deserves a chance on EHR."

== Charts ==
Chart (1991)	Peak position
US Billboard Hot 100	77
US Hot R&B/Hip-Hop Songs (Billboard)	18
