= Cats Without Claws =

Studio album by Donna Summer
- Released: September 11, 1984
- Recorded: October 1983–June 1984
- Studios: Lion Share (Los Angeles); Rhema (Beverly Hills); United Western (Hollywood)
- Genres: Pop; synth-pop; dance; post-disco; rock; new wave; gospel
- Length: 44:36
- Label: Geffen
- Producer: Michael Omartian

Donna Summer chronology
She Works Hard for the Money (1983)	Cats Without Claws (1984)	The Summer Collection: Greatest Hits (1985)

Singles from Cats Without Claws
- 1. "There Goes My Baby" Released: July 5, 1984; 2. "Supernatural Love" Released: October 23, 1984; 3. "Eyes" Released: May 14, 1985 (UK)

Professional ratings
Review scores
Source	Rating
AllMusic	2/5 stars
Robert Christgau	B

Cats Without Claws is the twelfth studio album by American pop singer Donna Summer, released on September 11, 1984. Summer had achieved monumental fame during the disco era of the 1970s, and in 1980 was signed to Geffen Records. She had had some degree of success with them, although her previous album had been released on another label. Cats Without Claws peaked at No. 40 on Billboard's album chart, failing to attain the success of its predecessor which peaked at No. 9.

Her previous studio album, She Works Hard for the Money (1983), gained more fame and success since the disco era, and as a result, its producer Michael Omartian was asked to produce the next studio album as well. Again the majority of tracks were written by Summer and Omartian, though a few other writers were credited including Summer's husband Bruce Sudano. As with the previous studio album, Cats Without Claws was pop and dance oriented but included soulful ballads. The album also contained a cover version of "There Goes My Baby", originally made popular by the Drifters, which became the first single. Although Summer requested "Oh Billy Please" as the first single, again Geffen and his executives rejected her request. A gospel song written by Reba Rambo and Dony McGuire entitled "Forgive Me" would win Summer a Grammy Award for Best Inspirational Performance.

Cats Without Claws produced three singles: "There Goes My Baby", "Supernatural Love" (also released as a 12" Single) and "Eyes". The song, “There Goes My Baby" reached No. 21 on the pop chart. This album also included 12" dance remixes included "Eyes" and "I'm Free". A 40th Anniversary re-issue was released April 18, 2025.

== Commercial performance ==
Cats Without Claws peaked at number 40 on the Billboard 200 chart and spent only 17 weeks on the chart. The album failed to attain the success of its predecessor, She Works Hard for the Money, which peaked at number 9. It reached a peak of number 69 on the UK Albums Chart, and was commercially unsuccessful.

The 40th Anniversary edition of the album was released on April 18, 2025.

== Track listing ==
All tracks are written by Michael Omartian and Donna Summer, except where noted.

Side one
No.	Title	Writer(s)	Length
1.	"Supernatural Love"	Omartian; Bruce Sudano; Summer	3:33
2.	"It's Not the Way"		4:22
3.	"There Goes My Baby"	Benjamin Nelson; Lover Patterson; George Treadwell	4:05
4.	"Suzanna"		4:29
5.	"Cats Without Claws"		4:20

Side two
No.	Title	Writer(s)	Length
1.	"Oh Billy Please"		4:55
2.	"Eyes"		4:45
3.	"Maybe It's Over"	Summer	4:43
4.	"I'm Free"	Omartian; Sudano; Summer	4:29
5.	"Forgive Me"	Dony McGuire; Reba Rambo	4:30
Total length:			44:36

2014 Demon Music Group bonus tracks
No.	Title	Writer(s)	Length
11.	"Face the Music"	Sudano; Summer	4:14
12.	"Eyes" (Jellybean 7" Remix Edit)		3:46
13.	"Supernatural Love" (Extended Dance Remix)	Omartian; Sudano; Summer	6:12
14.	"Eyes" (Extended Mix)		6:58
15.	"I'm Free" (Extended Mix)	Omartian; Sudano; Summer	6:18

== Personnel ==
Credits are adapted from the Cats Without Claws liner notes.

Musicians

- Donna Summer – lead vocals
- Michael Omartian – keyboards, additional drums, additional percussion
- Erich Bulling – Yamaha DX1 and Yamaha DX7 programming
- Paul Jackson Jr. – guitars
- Michael Landau – guitars
- Nathan East – bass guitar
- Mike Baird – drums
- Paulinho da Costa – percussion
- Gary Herbig – saxophone solos
- Dara Bernard – backing vocals
- Mary Ellen Bernard – backing vocals
- Cydney Davis – backing vocals
- Siedah Garrett – backing vocals
- Khaliq Glover – backing vocals
- Portia Griffin – backing vocals
- Susannah Melvoin – backing vocals
- Bruce Sudano – backing vocals
- Gene Van Buren – backing vocals
- Kin Vassy – backing vocals
- Terry Williams – backing vocals

Production and artwork

- Michael Omartian – producer, arrangements
- John Guess – engineer, mixing (1, 3, 5, 7–10)
- Jürgen Koppers – mixing (2, 4, 6)
- David Ahlert – second engineer
- Larry Ferguson – second engineer
- Tom Fouce – second engineer
- Ross Palone – second engineer
- Steve Hall – mastering at Future Disc (Hollywood, California)
- Ronnie Puccinelli – production coordinator
- Chris Whorf – art direction
- Jeffrey Fey – design
- Harry Langdon – photography

== Charts ==
=== Weekly charts ===
Chart performance for Cats Without Claws
Chart (1984)	Peak position
Australian Albums (Kent Music Report)	91
Dutch Albums (Album Top 100)	19
European Albums (Music & Media)	22
German Albums (Offizielle Top 100)	39
Italian Albums (Musica e dischi)	25
Japanese Albums (Oricon)	33
Norwegian Albums (VG-lista)	15
Spanish Albums (AFYVE)	12
Swedish Albums (Sverigetopplistan)	10
Swiss Albums (Schweizer Hitparade)	13
UK Albums (Official Charts)	69
US Billboard 200	40
US Cashbox Top Albums	38

=== Single ===
Year	Single	Chart	Position
1984	"There Goes My Baby"	US Billboard Hot 100	21
1984	"Supernatural Love"	US Billboard Hot 100	75
