= I Love You (Donna Summer song) =

- German single picture sleeve (also used for the back cover and other European releases; cropped from the cover of the parent album)

Single by Donna Summer

from the album Once Upon a Time
- B-side: "Once Upon a Time"; "Now I Need You" (Brazil)
- Released: December 15, 1977
- Studio: Musicland Studios (Munich, Germany)
- Genre: Disco
- Length: 4:43
- Label: Casablanca
- Songwriters: Donna Summer, Giorgio Moroder, Pete Bellotte
- Producers: Giorgio Moroder; Pete Bellotte

Donna Summer singles chronology
"Love's Unkind" (1977)	"I Love You" (1977)	"Once Upon a Time" (1977)

"I Love You" is a song by American singer and songwriter Donna Summer from her sixth studio album Once Upon a Time (1977). It peaked at number 10 on the UK Singles Chart and reached number 37 on the US Billboard Hot 100 in 1977. The song also peaked at 29, 10, and 24 in Canada, Norway, and Spain respectively.

== Background ==
Originally featured on Donna Summer's album Once Upon a Time, it was edited in length for release as a single. The album is a double LP concept album telling a modern-day Cinderella rags-to-riches story. "I Love You" is featured toward the end of the album when the main character comes face to face with the object of her desire and they declare their love for each other.

Record World called it a "swirling, melodic disco tune."

== Chart history ==
Chart performance for "I Love You"
Chart (1977–78)	Peak position
Australia (Kent Music Report)	47
Canada Top Singles (RPM)	29
France (SNEP)	28
Italy (Musica e dischi)	16
Norway (VG-lista)	10
Spain (AFE)	24
UK Singles (Official Charts)	10
US Billboard Hot 100	37
US Dance Club Songs (Billboard)	1
US Hot R&B/Hip-Hop Songs (Billboard)	28
US Cash Box Top 100	26

== In popular culture ==
The song was also featured prominently in the Saturday Night Live skits "Sabra Shopping Network" and "Sabra Price is Right", featuring Tom Hanks as Uri Shulenson. In 2018, the song was included in the Broadway musical Summer: The Donna Summer Musical. It was also included on the soundtrack for the musical.
