= I Don't Wanna Get Hurt =

1989 single by Donna Summer

Single by Donna Summer

from the album Another Place and Time
- B-side: "I Don't Wanna Get Hurt" (instrumental); "Dinner with Gershwin"
- Released: May 8, 1989 (UK)
- Studio: PWL (London, England)
- Genre: Eurodance; hi-NRG
- Length: 3:27 (album version); 3:32 (remix)
- Label: Warner Bros.
- Songwriter: Stock Aitken Waterman
- Producer: Stock Aitken Waterman

Donna Summer singles chronology
"This Time I Know It's for Real" (1989)	"I Don't Wanna Get Hurt" (1989)	"Love's About to Change My Heart" (1989)

"I Don't Wanna Get Hurt" is a song by American singer-songwriter Donna Summer. It was the second single from Another Place and Time and, like other tracks from the album, was produced by Stock Aitken Waterman. The song was remixed from the album version and released on May 8, 1989, by Warner Bros. Records, in several European countries. It was a top ten hit in UK and the second most-successful single from the album, behind "This Time I Know It's for Real".

== Background and writing ==
During recording, Summer expressed concerns that the track was not mature enough for her, and might better suit a much younger singer. However, she agreed to defer to the judgement of her writing and production team, Stock Aitken & Waterman (SAW), due to their massive international chart success at the time. She declined to film a video for the single, which went ahead without her, and confessed she found it difficult to participate in promotional duties for the track. Despite her limited involvement in promo, the song became a UK top 10 hit.

The decision to significantly remix the track for single release, "to impress Atlantic Records", caused controversy within SAW's production house, with both Mike Stock and original mixer Pete Hammond denouncing the single mix as inferior to the album cut. Summer was reported to particularly dislike the novelty pitched vocal effect that was added to the mix. In the wake of this discord, the track was never released as a single in the US.

== Critical reception ==
The Record Mirror said, "Brilliant intro. So good I was already jotting down 'tack-pop single of the year' until the Kylie Minogue production landed with a thump. Imagine jumping for joy and discovering the ceiling's inches above your head." Retrospectively, in 2017, Christian Guiltenane of British magazine Attitude stated that it was "nothing short of a sensation – a powerful hiRNG bullet that thwacks you right between the ears. Joyous!" In 2016, Pop Rescue gave a positive review, stating that "I Don't Wanna Get Hurt" "opens with chugging bass and roaring pop guitars before Donna Summer's crisp vocals arrive. Her voice is flawless and wonderfully suited to this song. It bounces along perfectly, and is incredibly pop and catchy".

== Chart performance ==
"I Don't Wanna Get Hurt" met with some success, although it did not manage to duplicate the same chart trajectories of Summer's previous single, "This Time I Know It's for Real". In the UK, it entered the chart at number 13 on May 27, 1989, then climbed to a peak of number seven, and stayed on the chart for nine weeks, three of them spent in the top-ten. It thus became Summer's penultimate top-ten hit in the country, the last one being the remixed version of "I Feel Love" in 1995. "I Don't Wanna Get Hurt" had its highest peak in Ireland where it climbed until number three, and was a top-ten hit in Finland and the Flanders region of Belgium, attaining number nine and eight, respectively. It missed the top-20 by one place in Italy and France, was a top-25 hit in West Germany and barely entered the top 30 in the Netherlands. On the Pan-European Hot 100 Singles chart established by Music & Media, it started at number 66 on June 3, 1989, rose to a peak of number 22 the following week, and had a 14-week chart run divided into two segments with a 13-week hiatus, due to its late release in France. Not much played on radios, it appeared for four weeks on the European Airplay Top 50, peaking at number 36 in its second week.

== Track listings ==
- 7-inch single
1. "I Don't Wanna Get Hurt" – 3:32
2. "I Don't Wanna Get Hurt" (instrumental) – 4:45
- 12-inch maxi
1. "I Don't Wanna Get Hurt" (extended version) – 6:58
2. "I Don't Wanna Get Hurt" (instrumental) – 4:45
3. "Dinner with Gershwin" – 4:38
- CD maxi
1. "I Don't Wanna Get Hurt" – 3:34
2. "Dinner with Gershwin" – 4:37
3. "I Don't Wanna Get Hurt" (instrumental) – 4:47

== Credits and personnel ==
- Backing vocals – Dee Lewis, Mae McKenna, Mike Stock
- Drums – A. Linn
- Guitar – Matt Aitken
- Keyboards – George De Angelis, Matt Aitken, Mike Stock
- Mixing – Mixmaster Phil Harding
- Engineer – Karen Hewitt, Yoyo
- Recorded at PWL
- Producer – Stock Aitken Waterman
- Hair – Andrene at Vidal Sassoon
- Styling – Kelly Cooper
- Photography – Lawrence Lawry
- Design – ADC Production

== Charts ==
=== Weekly charts ===
Weekly chart performance for "I Don't Wanna Get Hurt"
Chart (1989)	Peak position
Belgium (Ultratop 50 Flanders)	8
Europe (Eurochart Hot 100)	22
Europe (European Airplay Top 50)	36
Finland (Suomen virallinen lista)	9
France (SNEP)	21
Ireland (IRMA)	3
Italy (Musica e dischi)	21
Luxembourg (Radio Luxembourg)	5
Netherlands (Single Top 100)	29
Netherlands (Dutch Top 40)	30
Spain (PROMUSICAE)	40
UK Singles (OCC)	7
UK Dance (Music Week)	4
West Germany (GfK)	25

=== Year-end charts ===
Year-end chart performance for "I Don't Wanna Get Hurt"
Chart (1989)	Peak position
Belgium (Ultratop 50 Flanders)	93
