= Dinner with Gershwin =

Single by Donna Summer

from the album All Systems Go
- B-side: "Dinner with Gershwin (Instrumental)"
- Released: August 7, 1987
- Recorded: 1987
- Studio: Studio 55 (Los Angeles, CA)
- Genre: Dance-pop; R&B; synthpop; funk
- Length: 4:12 (7" version); 4:35 (LP version); 4:52 (Instrumental); 7:43 (Extended version)
- Label: Geffen (U.S.); Warner Bros. Records (Europe)
- Songwriter: Brenda Russell
- Producers: Richard Perry; Brenda Russell

Donna Summer singles chronology
"Eyes" (1985)	"Dinner with Gershwin" (1987)	"Only the Fool Survives" (1987)

Music video
- "Dinner with Gershwin" on YouTube

"Dinner with Gershwin" is a song by American singer-songwriter Donna Summer. The song was written by singer Brenda Russell and produced by Russell and Richard Perry. It was released on August 7, 1987 as the lead single from Summer's 13th studio album All Systems Go (1987) by Geffen Records (US) and Warner Bros. Records (UK).

Despite its parent album receiving mixed receptions, "Dinner with Gershwin" was reviewed as a standout from All Systems Go. The song gave Summer her final top ten hit on the Hot R&B Singles chart, peaking at number ten and was her first top ten on the R&B chart since 1983's "Unconditional Love". Despite that, the song became her first lead single since 1978 to miss the top forty on the US Billboard Hot 100, peaking at number 48. The song was a bigger hit in the United Kingdom, peaking at number 13 in that country.

The song was edited from the original album version for its release as a single, and the 12" edition also contained an exclusive non-album song called "Tearin' Down the Walls." Brenda Russell later recorded her own version of the song for her 1990 album Kiss Me with the Wind.

== Background ==
Writer Brenda Russell had originally written the song for herself, but once David Geffen, the founder of Geffen Records, heard the song, he made an offer for her to give the song to Summer.

== Content ==
In the song, Summer imagines meeting and chatting with famous figures such as title-sake George Gershwin, Rembrandt, Marie Curie, Pablo Picasso, Amelia Earhart and Mahalia Jackson. She wonders what it'd be like to hang out with them and imagines herself in their specific time periods.

To promote the song, Geffen Records distributed bottles of champagne along with the promotional single to radio, retail, and the media.

== Critical reception ==
Nelson George of Billboard called it a "charmingly funky record with a clever lyric." Marcello Carlin, in his book The Blue in the Air, called the single "burningly strange." An uncredited review in Cashbox praised the track saying, "This tune works well, its offbeat lyrics and catchy melody should capture listeners after a few plays."

== General reception ==
The music video was shown for 30 seconds in the beginning of a Sky Channel interview in 1987. It was later shown for 3 minutes and 14 seconds of its 4:07 runtime, closing the show.

== Track listing ==
7" - Geffen Records 7-28418 / Warner Bros. - 258 237-7

1. "Dinner with Gershwin" – 4:12
2. "Dinner with Gershwin (Instrumental)" – 4:52

12" - Warner Bros. U 8237 T

1. "Dinner with Gershwin (Extended Version)" – 7:43
2. "Dinner with Gershwin (LP Version)" – 4:35
3. "Tearing Down the Walls" – 3:59
- Also released as a picture disc (U 8237 TP)

== Official versions ==
- Album Version (4:38)
- 7" Version (4:12)
- Extended Version (7:43)
- Instrumental (4:52)
- Special Edited Dance Mix (4:36)

== Personnel ==
- Donna Summer – lead vocals
- Steve Lindsey – acoustic piano, synthesizers, organ, drum programming
- Brenda Russell – additional synthesizers, backing vocals
- Howie Rice – clavinet
- Stanley Clarke – clavinet concept
- Larry Klein – additional synthesizer programming, fretless bass
- Donald Griffin – guitar
- Collyer Spreen – percussion
- Terral (Terry) Santiel – additional percussion
- Gary Herbig – clarinet
- Maxi Anderson – backing vocals
- Bunny Hull – backing vocals
- Joe Turano – backing vocals

Production Credits

- Richard Perry – producer
- Brenda Russell – associate producer
- Glen Holguin – engineer, mixing
- Jim Tract – mixing
- Steve Peck – additional engineer
- Ken Felton – second engineer
- Scott Maddox – second engineer
- Craig Miller – second engineer

== Chart positions ==
Chart performance for "Dinner with Gershwin"
Chart (1987)	Peak position
Canada Top Singles (RPM)	39
Europe (European Hot 100 Singles)	41
Europe (European Airplay Top 50)	31
France (SNEP)	62
Ireland (IRMA)	13
Italy (Musica e dischi)	23
Netherlands (Dutch Top 40)	34
Netherlands (Single Top 100)	43
Spain (AFYVE)	43
Spain Airplay (Los 40)	19
UK Singles (Official Charts)	13
US Billboard Hot 100	48
US Adult Contemporary (Billboard)	38
US Dance Club Songs (Billboard)	13
US Hot Dance Music/Maxi-Singles Sales (Billboard)	16
US Hot R&B/Hip-Hop Songs (Billboard)	10
US Adult Contemporary (Radio & Records)	26
US Urban Contemporary (Radio & Records)	9
US Top 100 Singles (Cashbox)	56
US Top Black Contemporary Singles (Cashbox)	6
US Top 12" Dance Singles (Cashbox)	16
