= The Ultimate Collection (2003 Donna Summer album) =

Compilation album by Donna Summer
- Released: 2003
- Recorded: 1974–1999
- Genre: Pop, rock, disco, R&B
- Label: CCM/Universal Music

Donna Summer chronology
Live & More Encore (1999)	The Ultimate Collection (2003)	The Journey: The Very Best of Donna Summer (2003)

Professional ratings
Review scores
Source	Rating
Allmusic	3/5 stars

The Ultimate Collection is a greatest hits three-CD compilation of recordings by American singer Donna Summer released in the Netherlands in early 2003.

Unlike most of Summer's compilations, the 32-bit remastered Ultimate Collection includes the 16-minute album version of her breakthrough hit, "Love to Love You Baby, the original 12" versions of "Theme from The Deep (Down Deep Inside)", "Last Dance", "Hot Stuff", "Bad Girls", the original album or single versions of her biggest hits as well as the early European singles "The Hostage" and "Lady of the Night".

Disc three contains live recordings from the 1978 album Live and More alongside a selection of rarities such as the 1990s remixes of "I Feel Love" and "State of Independence" and the full-length album versions of the 1979 duet "No More Tears (Enough Is Enough)" with Barbra Streisand and "Je t'aime... moi non plus" from the 1978 soundtrack Thank God It's Friday.

An anomaly on this compilation is the heavily edited version of Summer's disco landmark "I Feel Love" appearing on disc one. While the original six-minute album–single version has been included on a number of other career retrospectives, on the otherwise exhaustive three-disc Ultimate Collection the track is for some reason only three minutes eleven seconds in length.

The Ultimate Collection, packaged in a double gatefold cardboard sleeve - although usually listed as a box set, was released by the Dutch label CCM, a subsidiary of Universal Music Holland. CCM has previously issued similar three-CD Ultimate Collections by artists like Grace Jones, Barry White, Diana Ross, Kool & The Gang, Dusty Springfield and others.

== Track listing ==
=== Disc 1 ===
1. "The Hostage" - (Pete Bellotte, Giorgio Moroder) - 4:16
2. "Lady of the Night"(Bellotte, Moroder) - 3:58
3. "Love to Love You Baby" (Album Version) (Bellotte, Moroder, Donna Summer) – 16:50
4. "Full of Emptiness" (Bellotte, Moroder) – 2:22
5. "Could It Be Magic" (Album Version) (Anderson, Manilow) – 5:15
6. "Try Me, I Know We Can Make It" (Single Version) (Bellotte, Moroder, Summer) - 4:46
7. "Spring Affair" (Single Version) (Bellotte, Moroder, Summer) - 4:02
8. "Winter Melody" (Album Version) (Bellotte, Moroder, Summer) - 6:31
9. "I Feel Love" (Edit) (Bellotte, Moroder, Summer) - 3:11
10. "Theme From The Deep (Down Deep Inside)" (12" Version) (Barry, Summer) - 6:07
11. "I Remember Yesterday" (Album Version) (Bellotte, Moroder, Summer) - 4:36
12. "Love's Unkind" (Album Version) (Bellotte, Moroder, Summer) - 4:07
13. "Back in Love Again" (Album Version) (Bellotte, Moroder, Summer) - 3:14
14. "I Love You" (Album Version) (Bellotte, Moroder, Summer" - 4:41
15. "Rumour Has It" (Album Version) (Bellotte, Moroder, Summer) - 4:54

=== Disc 2 ===
1. "Last Dance" (12" Version/Thank God It's Friday Album Version) (Jabara) - 8:09
2. "MacArthur Park" (Promotional 12" Mix) (Webb) - 6:25
3. "Hot Stuff" (12" Mix) Bellotte, Faltermeyer, Forsey) - 6:46
4. "Bad Girls" (Album Version) (Esposito, Hokenson, Sudano, Summer) - 4:56
5. "Dim All the Lights" (Single Version) (Summer) - 4:23
6. "Sunset People" (Album Version) (Bellotte, Faltermeyer, Forsey) - 6:24
7. "On The Radio" (Long Version) (Moroder, Summer) - 5:50
8. "The Wanderer" (Moroder, Summer) - 3:45
9. "State of Independence" (Album Version) (Anderson, Vangelis) - 5:49
10. "Love Is in Control (Finger on the Trigger)" (Jones, Ross, Temperton) - 4:19
11. "The Woman in Me" (John Bettis, Michael Clark) – 3:55
12. "She Works Hard for the Money" (Album Version) (Omartian, Summer) - 5:18
13. "Dinner with Gershwin" (Russell) - 4:39
14. "This Time I Know It's For Real" (Aitken, Stock, Summer, Waterman) - 3:37
15. "Melody of Love (Wanna Be Loved)" (Carrano, Clivilles, Cole, Summer) - 4:15

=== Disc 3 ===
1. "Love to Love You Baby" (Live Version - From Live & More, 1978) (Bellotte, Moroder, Summer) - 3:29
2. "Last Dance" (Live Version - From Live & More, 1978) (Jabara) - 5:51
3. "Je T'aime Moi Non Plus" (With Giorgio Moroder) (Thank God It's Friday Album Version) (Serge Gainsbourg) - 15:45
4. "Heaven Knows" (Featuring Brooklyn Dreams) (On the Radio Album Edit) (Bellotte, Moroder, Summer) - 3:32
5. "No More Tears (Enough Is Enough)" (Duet With Barbra Streisand) (On the Radio Album Version) (Jabara, Roberts) - 11:46
6. "Unconditional Love" (With Musical Youth) (Album Version) (Omartian, Summer) - 4:43
7. "State of Independence" (Anderson, Vangelis) (New Radio Millennium Mix - 1996 Remix) - 5:00
8. "I Feel Love" (Masters At Work 86th St Mix - 1995 Re-recording) - 6:09
9. "I Will Go with You (Con te partirò)" (Quarantotto, Sartori, Summer) - 4:10
