= Virgin Mary (song) =

Single by Donna Summer

from the album Love to Love You Baby (Dutch Version)
- B-side: "Pandora's Box"
- Released: September 30, 1975
- Genre: R&B
- Length: 4:59
- Label: Groovy
- Songwriters: Giorgio Moroder; Pete Bellotte
- Producer: Pete Bellotte

Donna Summer singles chronology
"Love to Love You" (1975)	"Virgin Mary" (1975)	"Love to Love You Baby" (1975)

"Virgin Mary" is a song by American singer Donna Summer, released in the Netherlands in 1975. It was written by Giorgio Moroder and Pete Bellotte and produced by Bellotte.

== Background and release ==
By 1975, Summer had been based in Munich, Germany for several years and had been working with European writers/producers Giorgio Moroder and Pete Bellotte for some time. They had released her debut album, "Lady of the Night" in the Netherlands the previous year, and it had spawned two European hit singles—"The Hostage" and "Lady of the Night". Earlier in 1975, a new single called "Love to Love You" had been released in the Netherlands, and would later be reworked and retitled "Love to Love You Baby" and be released internationally as Summer's breakthrough hit in both the United States and the United Kingdom. "Virgin Mary" was released in the Netherlands prior to this, as the follow-up to the original "Love To Love You".

== Composition and lyrics ==
Written by Moroder and Bellotte, the song contained slow verses and then sped up for the choruses, before returning to a slow fade out. It also made fairly heavy use of backing vocals. The lyrics told the story of a formerly beautiful woman now in her mid-30s but having aged prematurely due to being abused by the people of the town in which she lived, who disapproved of her wayward lifestyle as a youngster, and who believed gossip about her behaviour with men. As a result of her apparent behaviour, they named her "Virgin Mary".

== Impact and legacy ==
The final release before Summer's international breakthrough, "Virgin Mary" was not a big hit. This coupled with the fact that it was only released in one country has made the single somewhat of a collector's item. Mint copies of it are very hard to find, although used copies can sometimes be found on eBay. The song was featured on two LPs in Europe in the 1970s, being included on the Dutch release of Summer's "Love To Love You Baby" album (replacing "Full Of Emptiness," which was originally part of Summer's debut album) and also the Dutch/German-only "Greatest Hits" compilation in 1977. It was finally made available on CD in 2012, as part of a Giorgio Moroder compilation entitled On The Groove Train.

== Track listing ==
Netherlands 7" (Groovy GR 1215)

1. "Virgin Mary" – 4:59 (mistakenly listed as 4:02)
2. "Pandora's Box" – 3:08 (mistakenly listed as 3:14)
