= Denver Dream =

Denver Dream may refer to:

- Denver Dream (football), an LFL football team based in Denver, Colorado
- "Denver Dream" (song), a 1974 song by Donna Summer
