= Love to Love You Baby (album) =

Studio album by Donna Summer
- Released: August 27, 1975
- Recorded: May–June 1975
- Studios: Musicland, Munich, West Germany
- Genre: Eurodisco
- Length: 35:46
- Labels: Casablanca; Oasis
- Producer: Pete Bellotte

Donna Summer chronology
Lady of the Night (1974)	Love to Love You Baby (1975)	A Love Trilogy (1976)

Singles from Love to Love You Baby
- 1. "Love to Love You Baby" Released: November 26, 1975

Professional ratings
Review scores
Source	Rating
AllMusic	4.5/5 stars
Christgau's Record Guide	B−
The Rolling Stone Album Guide	3.5/5 stars

Love to Love You Baby is the second studio album by American singer Donna Summer, released on August 27, 1975, and her first to be released internationally and in the United States. Her previous album Lady of the Night (1974) was released only in the Netherlands. The album was commercially successful, mainly because of the success of its title track, which reached number 2 on the US Pop charts despite some radio stations choosing not to play the song due to its sexually explicit nature.

On the US Billboard Pop Albums chart, the album peaked at number 11 and became her first top 20 studio album but also was her last until the release of I Remember Yesterday (1977). To date, it remains one of Summer's most successful records.

== History ==
In the summer of 1974, Summer approached producers Giorgio Moroder and Pete Bellotte with an idea for a song. A re-issued 45 of "Je t'aime... moi non plus" by Jane Birkin and Serge Gainsbourg was back on the charts, prompting Summer to pen her own 'racy' song. She had come up with the lyric "love to love you, baby" as the possible title for the song. Moroder in particular was interested in developing the new disco sound that was becoming increasingly popular, and used Summer's idea to develop the song into an overtly sexual disco track. The original three-minute single was released several times before it had any success – and later edited versions of the re-recorded much longer track were the versions which became a major international hit, almost a year later. He had the idea that she should moan and groan orgasmically, but Summer was initially reticent. Eventually she agreed to record the song as a demo for other singers to hear and possibly record and release. Summer stated she was not completely sure of some of the lyrics, and parts of the song were improvised while recording. She later recalled on an episode of VH1's Behind the Music that she pictured herself as Marilyn Monroe acting out the part of someone in sexual ecstasy. Moroder liked Summer's recording and insisted it should actually be released. She reluctantly agreed and the song, titled "Love to Love You", was released to modest success in Europe.

The song, however, still did not have a US release after modest success in Europe. Moroder took it to Casablanca Records and label president Neil Bogart eventually decided to release it, but requested Moroder produce a version near twenty minutes. Summer, Moroder, and producer Pete Bellotte returned with a seventeen-minute version. Casablanca signed Summer and issued the single in November 1975 as "Love to Love You Baby". Casablanca distributed Summer's work in the US while other labels distributed it in different nations during this period. With the sound aesthetic and thudding four-on-the-floor kick-drum motif, Moroder and Bellotte established the template for Eurodisco.

"Love to Love You Baby" was Summer's first single and first hit in America, reaching #2 on the Billboard Hot 100 singles chart in early 1976. It also became her first number-one Hot Dance Club Play Chart hit. The album (side one of which was completely taken up with the full-length version of the title track) was also released in late 1975 and was soon certified gold for sales of over 500,000 copies in the US. The song was branded "graphic" by some music critics and was even banned by some radio stations for its explicit content. Time later reported that a record twenty-two orgasms were simulated by Summer in the making of the song. In some areas of the music press, Summer would later begin to be dubbed 'The First Lady of Love'. The album made the Top 20 in both the US and the UK.

The other songs on the album had a more soul/R&B feel to them. Side two consisted of four more original songs, plus a reprise of one of them. Two of the songs, "Full of Emptiness" (which was taken from her previous album Lady of the Night) and "Whispering Waves" were ballads, while "Need-a-Man Blues" was in a slightly more pop/disco vein, and "Pandora's Box" was more mid-tempo.

The track listing for side B differs in some European nations. In the Netherlands the album was released with the single "Virgin Mary" replacing the first version of "Full of Emptiness". On some releases in Germany, "Whispering Waves" and both versions of "Full of Emptiness" were removed. They were replaced by "Lady of the Night" and "The Hostage", both taken from the Lady of the Night album. In France, "The Hostage" was added as a bonus track at the end of side B.

== Track listing ==
=== Original release ===
All tracks are written by Giorgio Moroder and Pete Bellotte except where noted; all tracks produced by Bellotte.

Side one
No.	Title	Writer(s)	Length
1.	"Love to Love You Baby"	Donna Summer, Moroder, Bellotte	16:48

Side two
No.	Title	Length
1.	"Full of Emptiness"	2:22
2.	"Need-a-Man Blues"	4:30
3.	"Whispering Waves"	4:50
4.	"Pandora's Box"	4:56
5.	"Full of Emptiness" (reprise)	2:20

=== Alternate European track listings ===
All releases retained the same track listing for side one

Netherlands – Side two
No.	Title	Length
1.	"Virgin Mary"	4:02
2.	"Need-a-Man Blues"	4:30
3.	"Whispering Waves"	4:50
4.	"Pandora's Box"	4:56
5.	"Full of Emptiness"	2:20

Germany (Atlantic Release) – Side two
No.	Title	Length
1.	"Lady of the Night"	3:58
2.	"Pandora's Box"	4:56
3.	"Need-a-Man Blues"	3:09
4.	"The Hostage"	4:16

France – Side two
No.	Title	Length
1.	"Full of Emptiness"	2:22
2.	"Need-a-Man Blues"	4:30
3.	"Whispering Waves"	4:50
4.	"Pandora's Box"	4:56
5.	"Full of Emptiness (Reprise)"	2:20
6.	"The Hostage"	4:15

== Personnel ==
- Donna Summer – lead vocals
- Molly Moll, Nick Woodland, Pete Bellotte – guitar
- Dave King – bass guitar
- Michael Thatcher – keyboards
- Giorgio Moroder – keyboards, percussion
- Martin Harrison – drums
- Franz Deuber – string section
- Bernie Brocks – percussion
- Lucy, Betsy, Gitta, Pamela – backing vocals
- Strings and Horns arranged by Michael Thatcher

== Production ==
- Arranged by Giorgio Moroder
- Produced by Pete Bellotte
- Recorded by Reinhold Mack and Hans Menzel
- Mixed by Giorgio Moroder
- Lazzaroni, Zill – photography
- Stephen Lumel/Gribbitt! – art direction and design

== Charts ==
Chart performance for Love to Love You Baby
Chart (1976)	Peak position
Australian Albums (Kent Music Report)	7
Austrian Albums (Ö3 Austria)	10
Canada Top Albums/CDs (RPM)	16
French Albums (SNEP)	4
German Albums (Offizielle Top 100)	23
Italian Albums (Musica e dischi)	6
Japanese Albums (Oricon)	64
Norwegian Albums (VG-lista)	9
Portuguese Albums (Musica & Som)	3
Spanish Albums (AFE)	8
Swedish Albums (Sverigetopplistan)	7
UK Albums (Official Charts)	16
US Billboard 200	11

== Certifications and sales ==
Region	Certification	Certified units/sales
Canada (Music Canada)	Gold	50,000^{^}
France (SNEP)	Gold	100,000^{*}
Puerto Rico	—	20,000
United Kingdom (BPI)	Gold	100,000^{^}
United States (RIAA)	Gold	500,000^{^}
Summaries
Europe & United States as of February 1976	—	1,500,000
^{*} Sales figures based on certification alone.^{^} Shipments figures based on certification alone.
