= Four Seasons of Love =

Studio album by Donna Summer
- Released: October 11, 1976
- Recorded: August–September 1976
- Studios: Musicland Studios, Munich
- Genres: Eurodisco; soul; R&B
- Length: 32:28
- Label: Casablanca
- Producers: Giorgio Moroder; Pete Bellotte

Donna Summer chronology
A Love Trilogy (1976)	Four Seasons of Love (1976)	I Remember Yesterday (1977)

Singles from Four Seasons of Love
- 1. "Spring Affair" Released: August 24, 1976; 2. "Winter Melody" Released: January 9, 1977

Four Seasons of Love is the fourth studio album by American singer-songwriter Donna Summer. Released on October 11, 1976, this concept album became her third consecutive successful album to be certified gold in the US. It peaked at #29 on the Billboard 200. The album features four different songs, each one containing the name of a season in the title. Two songs were released as singles, but all four of the songs went to number one on the disco / dance chart.

== Overview ==
This was the third concept album Summer had made, though unlike the previous two which had contained one long track on side one and a small selection of slightly shorter ones on side two, Four Seasons of Love was more equally balanced. The album told the story of a love affair by relating it to the four seasons. Side one contained "Spring Affair" and "Summer Fever", both disco tracks, and side two contained "Autumn Changes" (a slightly slower disco number) and "Winter Melody" (which had an even slower beat), plus a reprise of "Spring Affair". This concept was reflected in the four photos of Summer, one for each season of the year, in a pull-out 1977 calendar included with the original LP album. The photo on the cover was, fittingly, the Summer pic. Summer's "first lady of love" image came across strongly on this album, though her trademark moans and groans were slightly less evident than on previous work. Pics included "Winter" in a fur with a tear on her cheek; "Spring" in a Scarlett O'Hara style hoop skirt on a swing; and "Autumn" re-enacting Marilyn Monroe's famous scene from The Seven Year Itch with the billowing white dress over the subway grate. This is an allusion to her song "Love to Love You Baby", for which she cites Monroe as an inspiration.

As with the previous two albums, Four Seasons of Love was distributed by different record labels in different countries, including Casablanca Records in the U.S. Edited versions of "Spring Affair" and "Winter Melody" were released in various places, but neither had a big impact on any charts (although the latter made the Top 30 on the UK singles chart). The album was also released as a Club Special Edition / Club Sonderauflage in West Germany on the Atlantic Records Label.

== Critical reception ==
Professional ratings
Review scores
Source	Rating
AllMusic	3/5 stars
The Rolling Stone Album Guide	2/5 stars

Michael Freedberg of AllMusic called the album "rapture indeed", noting that "the rhythms push and go poof as delicately as ever", "the horn section mutes and jazzes the melody", the beats stop, run, and stop again whenever they damn please", and "Summer expresses private rapture in falsetto as she smooches, oohs, and ahs onto the mix like lipstick traces".

Cashbox magazine reviewer stated that since there are only five songs on this album, at "first glance it seems a little slim", but "each tune, based on a season of the year, is pure Summer (Donna)". On the album, "accompanied by the Munich Machine, the sultry songstress runs the gamut of emotions, from lust to lustier", "the string parts are super-slick", and "the production makes full use of Summer's vocal abilities".

== Track listing ==
All tracks are written by Giorgio Moroder, Pete Bellotte and Donna Summer. The album features four different songs, each one containing the name of a season in the title. A fifth track, "Spring Reprise", is a reprise of the song "Spring Affair". All songs produced by Moroder and Bellotte.

Side one
No.	Title	Length
1.	"Spring Affair"	8:29
2.	"Summer Fever"	8:06

Side two
No.	Title	Length
1.	"Autumn Changes"	5:28
2.	"Winter Melody"	6:33
3.	"Spring Reprise"	3:51

== Personnel ==
- Donna Summer – lead vocals
- Thor Baldursson – keyboards, string and horn arrangements
- Keith Forsey – drums, percussion
- Nick Woodland – guitar
- Les Hurdle – bass guitar
- Dino Solera – saxophone
- Geoff Bastow – synthesizer
- Madeline Bell, Sue & Sunny – backing vocals

Technical

- Mixed by Giorgio Moroder
- Engineered by Jürgen Koppers
- Album Cover Concept by Susan Munao, Joyce Bogart & Donna Summer
- Design by Henry Vizcarra & Gribbitt!
- Art Direction by Gribbitt! & Chris Whorf
- Photography – Mario Casilli

== Charts ==
=== Weekly charts ===
Weekly chart performance for Four Seasons of Love
Chart (1976–77)	Peak position
Argentine Albums (CAPIF)	6
Canada Top Albums/CDs (RPM)	16
Danish Albums (Danmarks Radio)	20
Finnish Albums (Suomen virallinen lista)	22
French Albums (SNEP)	4
German Albums (Offizielle Top 100)	31
Italian Albums (Musica e dischi)	1
Portuguese Albums (Musica & Som)	7
Spanish Albums (AFE)	6
Swedish Albums (Sverigetopplistan)	40
US Billboard 200	29
US Top R&B/Hip-Hop Albums (Billboard)	13
US Cashbox Top 100	37
US Cashbox Top 75 R&B	12

=== Year-end charts ===
Year-end chart performance for I Remember Yesterday
Chart (1977)	Position
Canada Top Albums/CDs (RPM)	92
US Billboard 200	66

== Certifications and sales ==
Region	Certification	Certified units/sales
France (SNEP)	Gold	100,000^{*}
United Kingdom (BPI)	Silver	60,000^{^}
United States (RIAA)	Gold	500,000^{^}
^{*} Sales figures based on certification alone.^{^} Shipments figures based on certification alone.
