= Winter Melody =

- US 12-inch vinyl single; photo seen in some non-US releases and the inlet calendar from the parent album

Single by Donna Summer

from the album Four Seasons of Love
- B-side: Wasted (U.K.); Full of Emptiness (Netherlands); Summer Fever (Mexico)
- Released: January 9, 1977
- Genre: Soul
- Length: 6:33 (Album); 3:58 (7")
- Label: Casablanca (U.S.); GTO (U.K.); Groovy (The Netherlands)
- Songwriters: Donna Summer, Giorgio Moroder, Pete Bellotte
- Producers: Giorgio Moroder, Pete Bellotte

Donna Summer singles chronology
"Spring Affair" (1976)	"Winter Melody" (1977)	"Can't We Just Sit Down (And Talk It Over)" (1977)

"Winter Melody" is a song by American singer and songwriter Donna Summer released as a single in early-1977 from her Four Seasons of Love album. It became a top 30 hit in the UK, where it peaked at #27.

By this time Summer was making her name as the queen of disco music, though this song is a soul ballad. The song represented the "winter" phase of the concept album, and speaks of a woman struggling to come to terms with the fact that her relationship has ended. As with much of Summer's material at that time (particularly with songs found on her concept albums), the song played for a considerable amount of time (over six minutes), however, the song was edited for its release as a single.

Record World said that "This is the ballad that should establish the songstress as more than just a disco personality."

== Weekly charts ==
Chart (1977)	Peak Position
Canada Top Singles (RPM)	59
Canada Adult Contemporary (RPM)	21
Ireland (IRMA)	20
UK Singles (Official Charts)	27
US Billboard Hot 100	43
US Adult Contemporary (Billboard)	8
US Hot R&B/Hip-Hop Songs (Billboard)	21
