= Roberta Kelly =

American musician

Roberta Kelly (born November 23, 1942) is an American disco and urban contemporary gospel singer who scored three hits on the US Billboard Hot Dance Music/Club Play chart between 1976 and 1978. Her most successful US hit single, "Trouble-Maker", spent two weeks at No. 1.

From 1975 until 1983, she also performed as a backing vocalist with Thelma Houston and on a number of Donna Summer albums.

== Career ==
Kelly grew up in Los Angeles, California. In August 1972, during the Olympic Games, she traveled to Munich, West Germany to pursue her dreams of becoming a singer.

Prior to releases in the US through composer Giorgio Moroder's Oasis record label during the 1970s, Kelly recorded a single in Germany entitled "Kung Fu Is Back Again" (1974), released on Atlantic and produced by the songwriter-producer Pete Bellotte alongside Moroder. In 1974, Kelly was also hired by Sylvester Levay and Michael Kunze to provide vocals on an upcoming album for what would eventually be known as the Silver Convention.

In 1975 she released the single "Love Power" a cover version of a 1967 hit by the Sandpebbles, written by Teddy Vann, and later made famous as part of the repertoire of Luther Vandross. The single was backed with "Drifter", never included in any album and an example of the pre-disco Moroder-Bellotte production, similar to Donna Summer's "Lady of the night" material. In April 1976, Kelly turned to disco with the single "Trouble-Maker" and released an album by the same name. The album contained five tracks, including an extended version of "Love Power".

In 1977, she released Zodiac Lady, a controversial album that Casablanca Records, during the disco heyday, refused at first to release. Imports from Italy swamped the international dance floors, creating a hit for the title track and songs such as "Love Sign". This album spawned a twelve-inch single, "Zodiacs", which had major club and radio play. "Funky Stardust", "Love Sign" and "I'm Sagittarius" were released from that album, in addition to "Zodiacs" itself in different countries. "Zodiacs" peaked at No. 24 in the US Hot Dance/Club Play chart in 1977, and at No. 44 in the UK Singles Chart in 1978. "Love Sign" was released as a single in few countries only. Both "Trouble-Maker" and "Zodiac Lady" were produced by Moroder and Bellotte.

"One good thing about disco manufacturers is that they'll try anything. Here the gimmick is Jesus, invoked by name over unusually bright, bouncy, and consistent dance tracks flavored with gospel piano and some Jerry Jumonville saxophone. For me, this conjunction adds a perverse fillip to an already attractive record—I'm sure the folks at Studio 54 can use any kind of salvation that comes their way. Mary Magdalene would approve."

— Review of Gettin' the Spirit in Christgau's Record Guide: Rock Albums of the Seventies (1981)

Gettin' the Spirit, followed in March 1978. Produced by Giorgio Moroder and Bob Esty, it was an album consisting of gospel songs, performed in the disco style. The album featured dance versions of the Edwin Hawkins penned, "Oh Happy Day" and "To My Father's House", with both songs released on one single. "Gettin' the Spirit" was also released with a disco version of "My Sweet Lord". It peaked at No. 9 on the US Hot Dance/Club Play chart in 1978.

When Pope John Paul II succeeded John Paul I in 1978, Kelly released the single "John Paul II", which never made it onto an album, but the B-side, "Tribute to Love", did in the late 1980 release, Roots Can Be Anywhere. By this time, Kelly was no longer with Casablanca Records. Two singles were released: "Kabacka Shaka" and "Roots Can Be Anywhere", but the album had limited success also due to poor distribution. It was also released as "This is Roberta Kelly" with a longer version of Kabacka Shaka" and without "Coconut Rock". It was produced by Michael Holm.

In 1981, Kelly released the album, Tell Me, through Baby Records in Italy, featuring "Patty Cake", produced by Jürgen Koppers. It was a last attempt to revive disco. After that, Kelly's next release was not until 1995, when she issued The Sound of Color and "Jubilee in Germany", celebrating the 50th anniversary of the end of World War II.

In mid-2008, Kelly resurfaced with the single, "America (The Sound of Colour Realized)".

== Discography ==
=== Albums ===
- 1976: Trouble-Maker
- 1977: Zodiac Lady
- 1978: Gettin' the Spirit
- 1980: Roots Can Be Anywhere
- 1980: This Is Roberta Kelly
- 1981: Tell Me
- 1995: Sound of Color

=== Singles ===
- 1974: "Kung Fu Is Back Again"
- 1975: "Love Power"
- 1976: "Trouble-Maker"
- 1977: "Zodiacs"
- 1977: "Love Sign"
- 1977: "Funky Stardust"
- 1977: "I'm Sagittarius"
- 1978: "Oh Happy Day"
- 1978: "Gettin' the Spirit"
- 1979: "John Paul II"
- 1980: "Roots Can be Anywhere"
- 1980: "Kabacka Shacka"
- 1981: "Patty Cake"
- 2008: "America (The Sound of Colour Realized)"

== See also ==
- List of number-one dance hits (United States)
- List of artists who reached number one on the US Dance chart
