= Denver Dream (song) =

Single by Donna Summer
- B-side: "Something's In the Wind"
- Released: January 3, 1974
- Recorded: 1973
- Genre: Pop
- Length: 3:24
- Label: Lark Records
- Songwriter(s): Pete Bellotte
- Producer(s): Giorgio Moroder, Pete Bellotte

Donna Summer singles chronology
"Sally Go 'Round the Roses" (1971)	"Denver Dream" (1974)	"The Hostage" (1974)

"Denver Dream" is a song by American singer Donna Summer, released in 1974. This was her first collaboration with Giorgio Moroder and Pete Bellotte, a songwriting team that would stay together until 1981 and produce all of Summer's biggest disco hits. At this time Summer was living in Munich, Germany and singing backup for groups such as Three Dog Night. Through her job as a backup singer she met Moroder and before long he started using her as a lead vocalist. This single also marked the first usage of Summer's stage name (she had previously been credited as Donna Gaines, but had anglicised her married name to Austrian actor Helmut Sommer). It was released in The Netherlands, Belgium, and France in 1974, but did not make any particular impact on the chart. The B-side, "Something's in the Wind", would, in 1977, be re-worked into the single, "Back in Love Again", which would become a top-40 UK hit. Both sides of this single now appear on the CD compilation "Giorgio Moroder - Vol. 2-On The Groove Train 1974-85"
