= Hannah Jones (singer) =

British female dance music vocalist

Hannah Jones is a British female dance music vocalist, who scored Three Top 5 hits on the Hot Dance Music/Club Play chart in the late 1990s. Her first two songs hit #1 on that chart: "No One Can Love You More Than Me" in 1997 and "You Only Have To Say You Love Me" in 1998. The latter also climbed to No. 65 on the Billboard Hot 100.

== Hannah and Her Sisters ==
In 1991, British disco producer Peter John Bellotte put together a dance music version of Simon & Garfunkel's "Bridge over Troubled Water" with lead vocals by Jones. Released as P.J.B. featuring Hannah and Her Sisters, with the 'Sisters' being a US group put together by Bellotte, the song would go on to reach number 21 on the UK Singles Chart, which gave the group the chance to appear on Top of the Pops, which they did as the opening act on the 26 September 1991 episode.

== See also ==
- List of number-one dance hits (United States)
- List of artists who reached number one on the US Dance chart
