= Debralee Scott =

American actress (1953–2005)

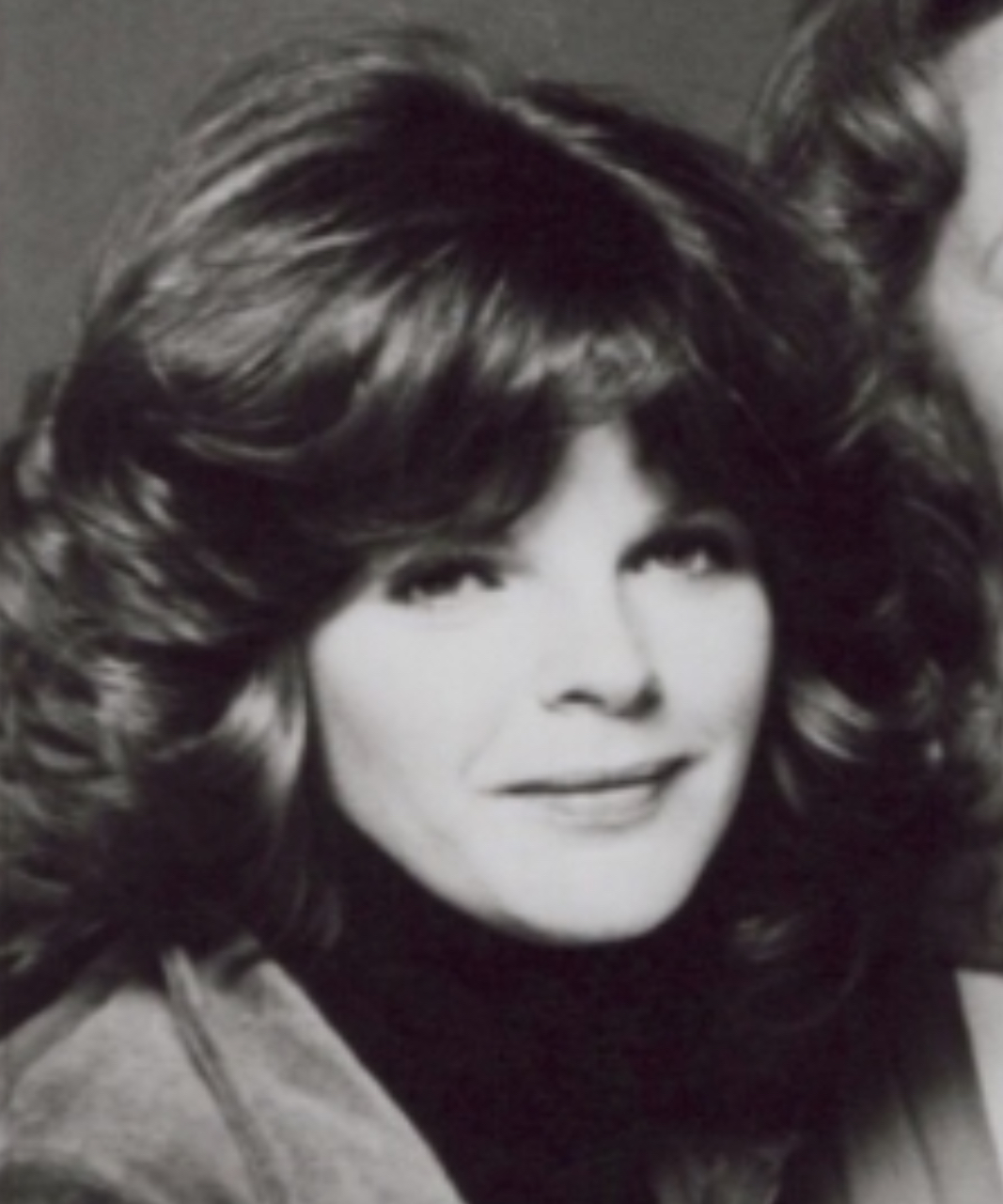
- Scott in Angie (1979)
- Born: April 2, 1953; Elizabeth, New Jersey, U.S.
- Died: April 5, 2005 (aged 52); Amelia Island, Florida, U.S.
- Occupation: Actress
- Years active: 1971–1989
- Spouse(s): Jonathan Frakes (m. 198?; div. 198?)

Debralee Scott (April 2, 1953 – April 5, 2005) was an American actress best known for her roles on the sitcoms Welcome Back, Kotter; Angie; Mary Hartman, Mary Hartman; and Forever Fernwood.

== Career ==
Scott was born and raised in Elizabeth, New Jersey, and later lived in Stroudsburg, Pennsylvania, where she was a cheerleader. At age 22, she found fame on Mary Hartman, Mary Hartman playing Mary's sister Cathy Shumway. She appeared on the first season of the sitcom Welcome Back, Kotter as Rosalie "Hotsie" Totsie; guest-starred in an episode of Gibbsville in 1976; and played Angie's younger sister Marie Falco in the Donna Pescow sitcom Angie.

Among her feature-film credits were the 1973 feature film American Graffiti, the 1974 film Earthquake, and the 1984 film Police Academy. She had an uncredited role in the 1971 film Dirty Harry.

Scott was a fixture on the game-show circuit in the late 1970s and early 1980s, frequently serving as a celebrity guest on shows, including Match Game, The $20,000 Pyramid, Riddlers, and Password Plus.

Scott also appeared with the cast of Angie on Celebrity Family Feud in November 1979. After the cast of Angie defeated the cast of The Ropers in the first match, Scott scored 176 points in the Fast Money round, leaving partner Robert Hays only needing 24 points as they successfully won a guaranteed minimum $5,000 for their charity. After defeating the cast of The Dukes of Hazzard in the Finals match, she then scored 234 points all by herself in the Fast Money round, getting 4 of the 5 most popular answers and winning before Hays ever got a chance to play, bringing their total to $15,000 for their charity. Host Richard Dawson noted that she was the first celebrity player and only the fourth player in the show's then-four-year-history to win a Fast Money round single-handedly.

For a while, Scott continued to work in front of the camera, appearing in two Police Academy movies, but she later retired and chose a career behind the camera, becoming an agent for a company in New York City called Empowered Artists.

In 2000, Scott appeared in a display with her former Mary Hartman, Mary Hartman castmates at the Museum of Television and Radio in Beverly Hills.

== Personal life and death ==
Scott was married to actor Jonathan Frakes for a time in the 1980s. The marriage had dissolved by 1986, when he became engaged to his next wife.

Scott then became engaged to John Dennis Levi, a police officer with the Port Authority of New York and New Jersey, who died in the September 11 attacks.

In 2005, shortly after moving to Florida to live with her sister, Scott fell into a coma and was hospitalized. She recovered and was released from the hospital on her birthday. However, she died in her sleep three days later, on April 5, 2005.

The mother of her fiancé later stated that Scott had a drinking problem, which led to her developing cirrhosis, which eventually caused her death. Her sister Jerri added that "she never did get over Dennis's death."

== Filmography ==
=== Film ===
Year	Title	Role	Notes
1971	Dirty Harry	Ann Mary Deacon	
1972	Butterflies Are Free	Girl in Opening Credits	
1973	American Graffiti	Falfa's Girl	
1974	Our Time	Ann Alden	
1974	The Crazy World of Julius Vrooder	Sister	
1974	Earthquake	Kathie	TV version only
1975	The Reincarnation of Peter Proud	Suzy	
1978	Just Tell Me You Love Me	Rebecca	
1980	Hot T-Shirts	Towngirl Dancer	
1982	Pandemonium	Sandy	
1984	Police Academy	Mrs. Fackler	
1986	Police Academy 3: Back in Training	Cadet Fackler	
1989	Misplaced	School Teacher	

=== Television ===
Year	Title	Role	Notes
1973	Lisa, Bright and Dark	Mary Nell Fickett	TV film
1973	A Summer Without Boys	Lenore Atkins	ABC Movie of the Week
1974	Sons and Daughters	Evie Martinson / Evie Mortenson	4 episodes
1974	Love Is Not Forever	Evie	TV film
1975	Movin' On	Amy Smith	Episode: "Weddin' Bells"
1975	The Secrets of Isis	Jenny	Episode: "Spots of the Leopard"
1975	Insight	Ann Harris	Episode: "The Prodigal Father"
1975–78	Welcome Back, Kotter	Rosalie 'Hotsy' Totsy	5 episodes
1976	Gibbsville	Ellen	Episode: "Saturday Night"
1976–77	Mary Hartman, Mary Hartman	Cathy Shumway	Main role
1977–78	Forever Fernwood	Cathy Shumway	Main role
1978	The Love Boat	Jane Cole	3 episodes
1978	Deathmoon	Sherry Weston	TV film
1979	Ryan's Hope	Jill's Nurse	3 episodes
1979–80	Angie	Marie Falco	Main cast
1980	The Donna Summer Special	Bad Girl	TV special
1981	Living in Paradise	Hazel Adamson	TV film
1983	Likely Stories, Vol. 2	Restaurant Woman	TV film
