= Love Is the Healer =

Single by Donna Summer

from the album Live & More Encore
- Released: 1999
- Recorded: 1999
- Genre: Disco, house
- Length: 3:23
- Label: Epic/Sony Music
- Songwriters: Donna Summer, Nathan DiGesare
- Producers: Nathan DiGesare, Thunderpuss

Donna Summer singles chronology
"I Will Go with You (Con te partirò)" (1999)	"Love Is the Healer" (1999)	"The Power of One" (2000)

"Love Is the Healer" is a song recorded by American singer Donna Summer in 1999 for her album Live & More Encore, the track being one of two new studio recordings included on the live album.

The song was written by Summer herself and producer Nathan DiGesare and co-produced by remix team Thunderpuss (Barry Harris and Chris Cox). Following the success of "I Will Go with You (Con te partirò)", it became Summer's second single in 1999 to top the US Club Play chart at number one. The song also peaked #9 in Spain singles charts and #14 in Spain Radio chart. Despite this, it was to be Summer's second and final single release on Epic Records.

== Single track listings ==
=== US CD single ===
1. "Love Is the Healer" (Album Version) - 3:23
2. "Love Is the Healer" (Thunderpuss 2000 Club Mix) - 8:58
3. "Love Is the Healer" (Eric Kupper's I Feel Healed 7" Mix) - 3:56

=== US 12" single ===
1. "Love Is the Healer" (Album Version) - 3:23
2. "Love Is the Healer" (Eric Kupper's I Feel Healed 12" Mix) - 8:13
3. "Love Is the Healer" (Thunderpuss 2000 Club Mix) - 8:58
4. "Love Is the Healer" (Eric Kupper's I Feel Healed 7" Mix) - 3:56

=== US promo 12" single #1 ===
1. "Love Is the Healer" (Tim Rex Lunar Vocal Mix) - 10:18
2. "Love Is the Healer" (Sussex House Club Vocal) - 6:27
3. "Love Is the Healer" (Eric Kupper's "I Feel Healed" 12" Mix) - 8:13
4. "Love Is the Healer" (Future Primitive Tribal-Tech Mix) - 8:30

=== US promo 12" single #2 ===
1. "Love Is the Healer" (Thunderpuss 2000 Club Mix) - 8:58
2. "Love Is the Healer" (Eric Kupper's I Feel Healed 7" Mix) - 3:56
3. "Love Is the Healer" (J.P.'s Sound Factory Mix) - 9:27
4. "Love Is the Healer" (Thunderpuss 2000 Radio Mix) - 3:19

=== CD single Europe ===
1. "Love Is the Healer" (Album Version) - 3:23
2. "Love Is the Healer" (Eric Kupper's I Feel Healed 7" Mix) - 3:56
3. "Love Is the Healer" (Eric Kupper's "I Feel Healed" 12" Mix) - 8:13
4. "Love Is the Healer" (Thunderpuss 2000 Club Mix) - 8:58
5. "Love Is the Healer" (Thunder Drum-a-pella) - 9:17

== See also ==
- List of number-one dance singles of 1999 (U.S.)
