= The Donna Summer Special =

1980 American musical television special

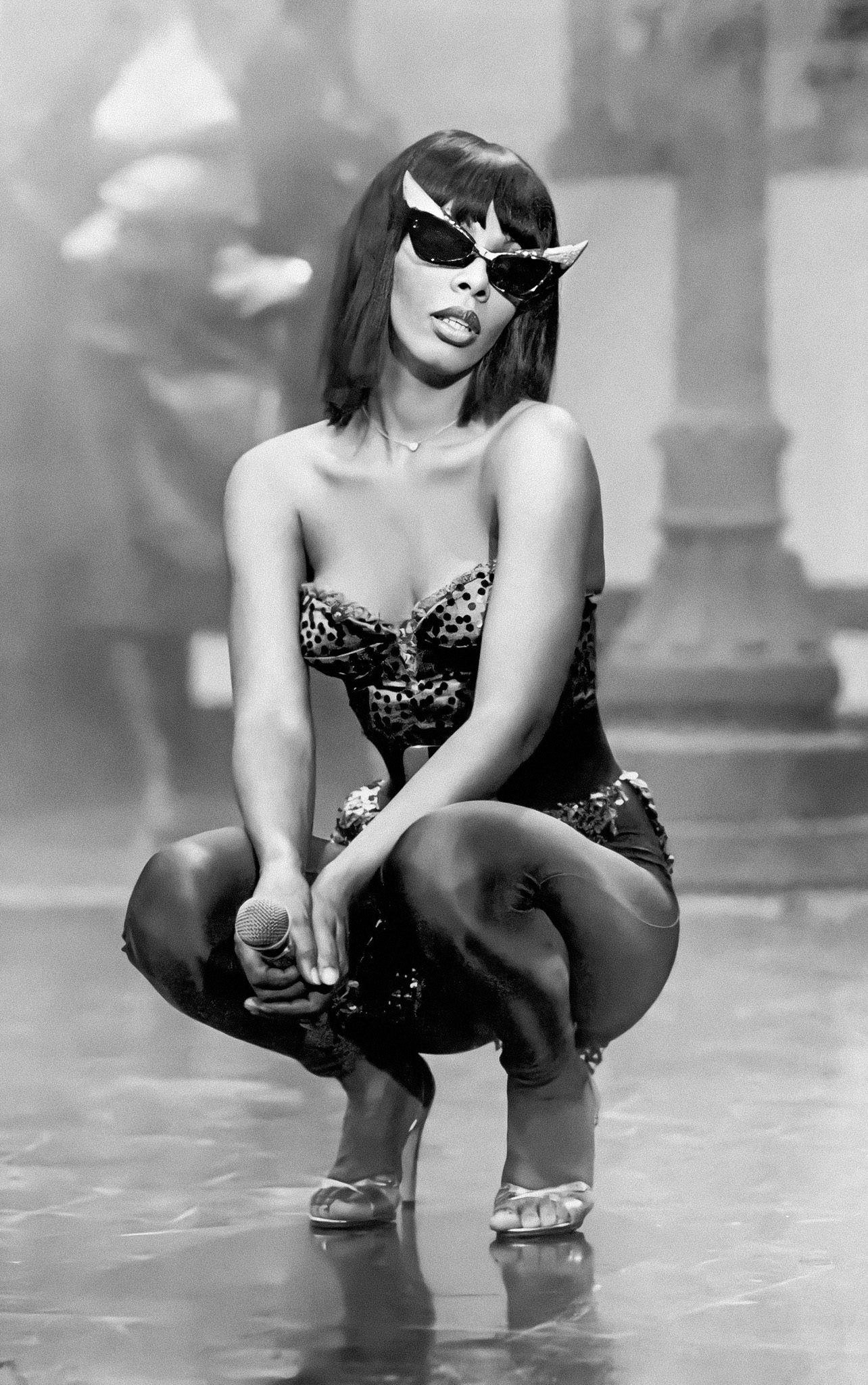
- Promotion photo of Summer performing "Bad Girls"
- Written by: Rod Warren; Ernest Chambers
- Directed by: Don Mischer
- Starring: Donna Summer; Pat Ast; Robert Guillaume; Debralee Scott; Mimi Sommer; Twiggy
- Country of origin: United States
- Original language: English

Production
- Executive producer: Susan Munao
- Producer: Ernest Chambers
- Running time: 60 minutes
- Production company: Casablanca Records and Filmworks

Original release
- Network: ABC
- Release: January 27, 1980

The Donna Summer Special is a 1980 musical television special starring singer Donna Summer.

== Overview ==
A variety television special that showcased the musical talents of singer and actress Donna Summer.
