= Trouble-Maker (song) =

Single by Roberta Kelly

from the album Trouble-Maker
- B-side: "The Family"
- Released: April 28, 1976
- Recorded: 1975
- Genre: Disco
- Length: 3:59 (7" version); 8:48 (Album version)
- Label: Oasis
- Songwriters: Giorgio Moroder, Pete Bellotte
- Producers: Giorgio Moroder, Pete Bellotte

Roberta Kelly singles chronology
"Love Power" (1975)	"Trouble-Maker" (1976)	"Zodiacs" (1977)

"Trouble-Maker" is a 1976 single by disco/gospel singer, Roberta Kelly. The single, written and produced by Giorgio Moroder and Pete Bellotte, was a number-one hit on the disco chart for two weeks. "Trouble Maker" failed to reach either the pop or soul charts.
