= Live & More Encore =

Live album by Donna Summer
- Released: June 6, 1999
- Recorded: February 28, 1999
- Venues: Hammerstein Ballroom, New York City
- Genres: Disco, R&B, soul
- Length: 61:09
- Label: Epic
- Producers: Donna Summer, Bruce Sudano, Wayne Isaak, Bruce Gillmer, Lee Chesnut

Donna Summer chronology
Endless Summer: Greatest Hits (1994)	Live & More Encore (1999)	The Ultimate Collection (2003)

Professional ratings
Review scores
Source	Rating
AllMusic	3/5 stars

Live & More Encore is a live album released by Donna Summer in 1999, an edited version of a televised concert of the same name. Released on Sony Music's sublabel Epic, it features a live concert which had been filmed especially for the VH-1 channel, and also two new dance tracks, including a re-working of "Time to Say Goodbye", a semi-classical song previously made popular by Andrea Bocelli and Sarah Brightman. Summer's dance version of the song is titled "I Will Go with You (Con te partirò)". Both of the album's two studio recordings, the other being "Love Is the Healer", reached No. 1 on the US Dance chart, with "I Will Go with You" nominated for a Grammy as Best Dance Recording.

In the concert, Summer performs some of her biggest hits both from the 1970s disco era through to the 1980s. The song "No More Tears (Enough Is Enough)", originally a duet with Barbra Streisand, is performed with Australian singer Tina Arena. The song was one of the concert's highlights, earning enthusiastic applause from the audience. Another notable moment is when Summer tells how she wrote "Dim All the Lights" for Rod Stewart, but at the last minute decided to keep it for herself. She then performs the first half of the song the way she imagines Stewart might have sung it, and finishes it in the style she originally recorded it.

In 2013, the album was re-released without the studio tracks as Playlist: The Very Best of Donna Summer, including bonus songs only previously available on the accompanying video release.

== Track listing ==
=== Live & More Encore ===
1. "MacArthur Park" (Webb) – 6:38
2. "This Time I Know It's for Real" (Aitken, Stock, Summer, Waterman) – 3:12
3. "I Feel Love" (Bellotte, Moroder, Summer) – 3:50
4. "On the Radio" (Moroder, Summer) – 4:29
5. "No More Tears (Enough Is Enough)" – duet with Tina Arena (Jabara, Roberts) – 4:21
6. "Dim All the Lights" (Summer) – 6:03
7. "She Works Hard for the Money" (Omartian, Summer) – 4:31
8. "Bad Girls" (Esposito, Hokenson, Sudano, Summer) – 3:06
9. "Hot Stuff" (Bellotte, Faltermeyer, Forsey) – 4:19
10. "My Life" (Barry, Miller, Summer, Waterman) – 5:58
11. "Last Dance" (Jabara) – 7:08
12. "Love Is the Healer" (DiGesare, Summer) – 3:23
13. "I Will Go with You (Con te partirò)" (Quarantotto, Sartori, Summer) – 4:10

=== Playlist: The Very Best of Donna Summer ===
1. "MacArthur Park" (Webb) – 6:38
2. "This Time I Know It's for Real" (Aitken, Stock, Summer, Waterman) – 3:11
3. "I Feel Love" (Bellotte, Moroder, Summer) – 3:31
4. "On the Radio" (Moroder, Summer) – 3:59
5. "No More Tears (Enough Is Enough)" – duet with Tina Arena (Jabara, Roberts) – 5:04
6. "If There Is Music There" – 5:34
7. "Riding Through The Storm" – 6:15
8. "Don't Wanna Work" – 4:44
9. "Nobody" – 5:41
10. "Dim All the Lights" (Summer) – 6:07
11. "She Works Hard for the Money" (Omartian, Summer) – 4:31
12. "Bad Girls" (Esposito, Hokenson, Sudano, Summer) – 2:51
13. "Hot Stuff" (Bellotte, Faltermeyer, Forsey) – 4:32
14. "Last Dance" (Jabara) – 7:01

== Charts and certifications ==
=== Weekly charts ===
Chart (1999)	Position
Belgian Albums (Ultratop Flanders)	45
Belgian Albums (Ultratop Wallonia)	44
French Albums (SNEP)	37
German Albums (Offizielle Top 100)	75
Spanish Albums (Promusicae)	11
US Billboard 200	43

=== Singles ===
Year	Title	US Pop	UK	Spain
1999	"I Will Go with You (Con te partirò)"	79	44	2

=== Certifications and sales ===
Region	Certification	Certified units/sales
Spain (Promusicae)	Platinum	100,000^{^}
United States	—	407,000
^{^} Shipments figures based on certification alone.
