= Spring Affair =

- Belgian vinyl picture sleeve

Single by Donna Summer

from the album Four Seasons of Love
- B-side: "Come With Me"; "Summer Fever" (South Africa); "Winter Melody" (Germany, Peru); "Spring Affair (Part. 2)" (Mexico)
- Released: August 24, 1976
- Genre: Eurodisco
- Length: 8:29; 3:51 (reprise); 3:39 (single edit)
- Label: Casablanca (U.S.); Atlantic (Germany/France); Groovy (The Netherlands)
- Songwriters: Donna Summer, Giorgio Moroder, Pete Bellotte
- Producers: Giorgio Moroder, Pete Bellotte

Donna Summer singles chronology
"Try Me, I Know We Can Make It" (1976)	"Spring Affair" (1976)	"Winter Melody" (1977)

"Spring Affair" is a song by American singer and songwriter Donna Summer from her 1976 album Four Seasons of Love. The song (which represents the "spring" phase of the concept album) tells of the beginning of a new relationship. "Spring Affair" is more than eight minutes long, though it was edited for release as a single. The song peaked at number 1 on the US Billboard Disco chart and number 15 in Spain singles charts and number 3 in Spain Radio chart.

"Spring Affair" was sampled extensively on "Super Disco" by Alex Gopher and Étienne de Crécy from Super Discount (1996).

== Track listing ==
Standard release

1. "Spring Affair" – 3:39
2. "Come With Me" – 4:20

Mexican 7-inch single (RCA Victor SP-4696)

1. "Spring Affair" (Parte 1)
2. "Spring Affair" (Parte 2)

Germany 7-inch single (Atlantic 10 884N)

1. "Spring Affair" – 3:39
2. "Winter Melody" – 3:51

== Weekly charts ==
Chart (1976)	Peak Position
Canada Top Singles (RPM)	80
Canada Dance/Urban (RPM)	4
France (SNEP)	28
Italy (Musica e dischi)	5
Netherlands (Single Top 100)	25
Spain Singles (Promusicae)	13
US Billboard Hot 100	58
US Hot R&B/Hip-Hop Songs (Billboard)	24
