= Love to Love You Baby (song) =

1975 single by Donna Summer

- A-side label of US vinyl single

Single by Donna Summer

from the album Love to Love You Baby
- B-side: "Need-a-Man Blues"
- Released: March 28, 1975
- Recorded: 1974 (as "Love to Love You"); May–June 1975 (as "Love to Love You Baby")
- Studio: Musicland, Munich, West Germany
- Genre: Euro disco; psychedelia
- Length: 3:20 (original NL version); 16:49 (album version); 4:57 (single version)
- Label: Oasis
- Songwriters: Giorgio Moroder; Pete Bellotte; Donna Summer
- Producer: Pete Bellotte

Donna Summer singles chronology
"Lady of the Night" (1974)	"Love to Love You Baby" (1975)	"Virgin Mary" (1975)
"Virgin Mary" (1975)	"Love to Love You Baby" (1975)	"Could It Be Magic" (1976)
"Protection" (1982)	"Love to Love You Baby (re-issue)" (1983)	"She Works Hard for the Money" (1983)

Live video
- "Love to Love You Baby" on YouTube

"Love to Love You Baby" is a song by American singer Donna Summer from her second studio album, Love to Love You Baby (1975). Produced by Pete Bellotte, and written by Italian musician Giorgio Moroder, Summer, and Bellotte, the song was first released as a single in the Netherlands in June 1975 as "Love to Love You" and then released worldwide in November 1975 as "Love to Love You Baby". It became one of the first disco hits to be released in an extended form.

The Rock and Roll Hall of Fame named it one of the 500 Songs That Shaped Rock and Roll.

== Background ==
By 1975, Donna Summer had been living in Germany for eight years and had participated in several musical theatre shows. She had released the 1974 album Lady of the Night in The Netherlands, written by Giorgio Moroder and Pete Bellotte and produced by Bellotte, which had given her a couple of hit singles. She was still a complete unknown in her home country when she suggested the lyric "Love to Love You Baby" to Moroder in 1975. He turned the lyric into a full disco song and asked Summer to record it. The full lyrics were somewhat explicit, and at first, Summer said she would only record it as a demo to give to someone else. However, Summer's erotic moans and groans impressed Moroder so much that he persuaded her to release it as her own song, and "Love to Love You" became a moderate hit in the Netherlands.

In an interview in 1976, Summer responded to a number of questions that she claimed she'd been asked about the process of recording the song: "Everyone's asking, 'Were you alone in the studio?' Yes, I was alone in the studio. 'Did you touch yourself?' Yes, well, actually I had my hand on my knee. 'Did you fantasize on anything?' Yes, on my handsome boyfriend Peter."

A tape of the song was sent to Casablanca Records president Neil Bogart in the US, and he played it at a party at his home. Impressed with the track, Bogart continued to play it over and over all night. He later contacted Moroder and suggested that he make the track longer — possibly as long as 20 minutes. However, Summer again had reservations; she was not sure of all of the lyrics. Nevertheless, she imagined herself as an actress (namely Marilyn Monroe) playing the part of someone in sexual ecstasy. The studio lights were dimmed so that Summer was more or less in complete darkness as she lay on the floor.

The final recording lasted over 16 minutes, and according to the BBC, contained 23 "orgasms". By that point, the song was renamed "Love to Love You Baby". It took up the entire first side of the album of the same name, and edited versions were also found on 7" vinyl.

== International release and reception ==
Originally released in November 1975, the song became an international disco smash. In the US, it became Summer's first US Top 40 hit, spending two weeks at #2 on the Billboard Hot 100 chart on February 7 and 14, 1976, being held off the number one spot by Paul Simon's "50 Ways to Leave Your Lover" and logged four weeks atop the Billboard Dance Club Songs chart, as well number three on the Billboard Hot Soul Singles chart.

In the UK, upon release in January 1976, the song reached #4 on the UK Singles Chart in spite of the BBC's initial refusal to promote it.

== Impact and legacy ==
Rock and Roll Hall of Fame named the song one of the 500 Songs That Shaped Rock and Roll in 1995.

VH1 placed "Love to Love You Baby" at number 63 in their list of 100 Greatest Dance Songs in 2000.

Slant Magazine ranked the song 10th in its 100 Greatest Dance Songs in 2006.

According to Peter Shapiro, a freelance British music journalist, the song was marked by "little more than Donna Summer simulating an orgasm over a background of blaxploitation cymbals, wah-wah guitars, a funky-butt clarinet riff, and some synth chimes." He continued, "Love to Love You Baby" [...] was extended into a seventeen-minute minisymphony at the behest of Casablanca Records chief Neil Bogart, who wanted a soundtrack for his sexual exploits. The song reached number two in the American charts and was largely responsible for the development of the twelve inch single." The Rolling Stone Record Guide called it "a novelty dance number. But it's too slow for dancing and too long for the recorded multiple orgasms not to become self-parodying."

Donna Summer was forced to stop performing "Love to Love You" live when, "Riots broke out [...] [She] was in a tent in Italy, 5,000 men, almost no women, and was doing 'Love to Love You, Baby,' fairly scantily clad, and the guys got so wrapped up that they began to push the stage back. And [she] had to run off the stage, to [her] trailer out the back. And they came to the trailer and started to rock it. [She] just thought, 'I'm going to die today, I'm not going to get out of here.' It's not the kind of song you just want to throw out there."

== Personnel ==
- Donna Summer – lead vocals
- Pete Bellotte – guitars
- Dave King – bass
- Michael Thatcher & Giorgio Moroder – keyboards
- Martin Harrison – drums
- Lucy Neale, Betsy Allen, Gitta Walther – backing vocals

== Track listing and formats ==
- Original Netherlands 7" (Groovy GR 1211)
1. "Love to Love You" (3:20)
2. "Need-a-Man Blues" (?)

Note: This original release (without the "Baby" in the title) ran for just over 3 minutes and 20 seconds. This version was integrated into the 16-minute version found on the album. All subsequent international releases either contained a new edit of the full album version (lasting just under five minutes) or the original version (but still adding "Baby" to the title). In some cases (for example, the United States), both versions were found
on different sides of the record.

- US 7" (Oasis OC 401)
1. "Love to Love You Baby" (4:57)
2. "Love to Love You Baby" (3:27)
- UK 7" (GTO GT 17)
1. "Love to Love You Baby" (4:57)
2. "Need-a-Man Blues" (?)
- West Germany 7" (Atlantic ATL 10625)
1. "Love to Love You" (3:20)
2. "Need-a-Man Blues" (3:09)

Note: The word "Baby" appears on the sleeve but not the label.

- Netherlands 7" (Groovy GR 1218)
1. "Love to Love You Baby Part I" (3:30)
2. "Love to Love You Baby Part II" (5:20)

Note: This Dutch re-release was issued shortly after the song became a hit internationally, with "Baby" being added to the title.

- France 7" (Atlantic 10.693)
1. "Love to Love You Baby (Part 1)" (3:27)
2. "Love to Love You Baby" (Part 2)" (4:57)
- Canada 7" (Oasis OC 401X)
1. "Love to Love You Baby" (3:22)
2. "Need-a-Man Blues" (3:12)
- Sweden 7" (Polar POS 1209)
1. "Love to Love You Baby" (3:21)
2. "Need-a-Man Blues" (3:10)
- Spain 7" (Ariola 16575)
1. "Love to Love You Baby" (3:42)
2. "Need-a-Man Blues" (4:30)

=== 1983 re-issue ===
Following the dance chart success of the Patrick Cowley remix of Summer's "I Feel Love" in 1982, Casablanca Records/PolyGram re-issued her first hit single "Love to Love You Baby". However, the single failed to make an impact on the charts the second time around, and it would be the label's final single re-release of tracks from the Donna Summer back catalog in the 1980s. In 1984, Casablanca Records was closed by PolyGram.

- UK 7" (Casablanca CAN 1014)
1. "Love to Love You Baby" (Part One) – 3:35
2. "Love to Love You Baby" (Part Two) – 4:12
- UK 12" (Casablanca CANX 1014)
1. "Love to Love You Baby" (Come On Over to My Place Version) – 16:50
2. "Love to Love You Baby" (Come Dancing Version) – 8:10 (A Young and Strong mega-edit)

Note: The "Come On Over to My Place Version" is in fact the original full-length album version.

=== 1990 re-release ===
- Germany CD single (Casablanca 874 395-2)
1. "Love to Love You Baby" – 4:15
2. "I Feel Love" – 5:39
3. "Bad Girls" – 3:54
4. "On the Radio" (long version) – 5:51

=== 2013 release ===
1. "Love to Love You Baby" (Giorgio Moroder Remix) (featuring Chris Cox) (4:15)

== Charts ==
=== Weekly charts ===
Chart (1975–1976)	Peak position
Australia (Kent Music Report)	4
Austria (Ö3 Austria Top 40)	9
Canada Top Singles (RPM)	1
France (SNEP)	16
Ireland (IRMA)	11
Italy (Musica e dischi)	11
Netherlands (Dutch Top 40)	17
Netherlands (Single Top 100)	13
New Zealand (Recorded Music NZ)	8
Norway (VG-lista)	2
Portugal (Musica & Som)	4
Spain (Promusicae)	6
Sweden (Sverigetopplistan)	5
Switzerland (Schweizer Hitparade)	6
UK Singles (Official Charts)	4
US Billboard Hot 100	2
US Hot Soul Singles (Billboard)	3
West Germany (GfK)	6

Chart (2012)	Peak position
France (SNEP)	77
Netherlands (Single Top 100)	90
UK Singles (OCC)	138

=== Year-end charts ===
Chart (1976)	Rank
Australia (Kent Music Report)	50
Canada Top Singles (RPM)	25
UK Singles (OCC)	61
US Billboard Hot 100	41

== Certifications and sales ==
Region	Certification	Certified units/sales
Canada (Music Canada)	Gold	75,000^{^}
United Kingdom	—	250,000
United States (RIAA)	Gold	1,000,000^{^}
^{^} Shipments figures based on certification alone.

== Cover versions and samples ==
- The refrain "Love to love you" can be heard predominantly in the background of Diana Ross' 1976 hit "Love Hangover" from her album Diana Ross.
- In 1982, Indian singer Sharon Prabhakar recorded a cover of the song in Hindi, entitled "Aaj Ki Raat" on her album Disco Mastana, released on Multitone Records.
- Bronski Beat recorded a medley with Marc Almond consisting of "I Feel Love", "Love to Love You Baby" and "Johnny Remember Me" (by John Leyton) on their 1985 remix album Hundreds & Thousands.
- An excerpt of the song was featured in a medley with "Baby Face" performed by the Brady Bunch during the first episode of The Brady Bunch Variety Hour and a subsequent tell-all book about the show by Cindy Brady actress Susan Olsen was titled Love to Love You Bradys.
- Digital Underground made the song the central sample of the song "Freaks of the Industry" on their 1990 debut album Sex Packets.
- Samantha Fox covered her tune into a medley with "More, More, More" from her 1991 album Just One Night.
- TLC sampled the song on the album version of their 1999 song "I'm Good at Being Bad" from their album FanMail.
- The Tom Tom Club recorded a cover for their 2000 album The Good, the Bad, and the Funky.
- Eyedea & Abilities sampled the bassline for their song "Big Shots", on their 2001 album First Born. "Big Shots" would later feature on the soundtrack to the 2002 video game Tony Hawk's Pro Skater 4.
- No Doubt covered the song on the soundtrack for the 2001 film Zoolander.
- Beyoncé also sampled the refrain of the song for her 2004 hit "Naughty Girl" on her album Dangerously in Love, which she performed live for the Fashion Rocks Awards 2004. She would later interpolate more elements of the original version in live performances, such as in The Mrs. Carter Show World Tour in 2013-2014.
- French male model and singer Baptiste Giabiconi covered it as an adaptation and heavy sampling of the hit in 2016, but with added lyrics and new EDM arrangement. His version credited to mononym Giabiconi entered the French SNEP chart at #14 in July 2016. It eventually made it to number 4 in France.
- In 2018, the song was included in the Broadway musical Summer: The Donna Summer Musical.
- Kylie Minogue performed the song as a medley with her 2003 single "Slow" on her 2020 live stream concert Infinite Disco.
- Tech N9ne sampled the song in "Trapped in a Psycho's Body" from his 2002 album Absolute Power.

== See also ==
- 1975 in music
