= Lady of the Night (song) =

1974 single by Donna Summer

- Dutch picture sleeve

Single by Donna Summer

from the album Lady of the Night
- B-side: "Wounded"
- Released: November 1974
- Genre: Pop
- Length: 3:58
- Label: Groovy
- Songwriters: Giorgio Moroder; Pete Bellotte
- Producer: Bellotte

Donna Summer singles chronology
"The Hostage" (1974)	"Lady of the Night" (1974)	"Love to Love You" (1975)

"Lady of the Night" is a song recorded by American singer Donna Summer for her self-titled debut studio album. The song was written by Giorgio Moroder and Pete Bellotte and produced by the latter.

The song was released as the second single from the album in November 1974. The song "Wounded" was used as the B-side. In the Netherlands, "Lady of the Night" reached the fourth place. In 1975, the song was released in West Germany, Austria and Belgium, in the latter countries the song also managed to get into the top ten.

== Critical reception ==
Christian John Wikane from PopMatters noted that the song featured Summer's bell-clear belt ringing high above the Phil Spector-styled wall of sound. GQ's David Levesley, when compiling a list of Donna Summer's "songs that changed the way we dance", placed the song in second place and described it as "stone-cold objective bop" and added that "it's so Frankie Valli and yet has a sensibility completely different from anything you'd have found on Tin Pan Alley".

== Charts ==
=== Weekly charts ===
Weekly chart performance for "Lady of the Night"
Chart (1974–76)	Peak position
Austria (Ö3 Austria Top 40)	6
Belgium (Ultratop 50 Flanders)	3
Belgium (Ultratop 50 Wallonia)	8
Netherlands (Dutch Top 40)	4
Netherlands (Single Top 100)	4
West Germany (GfK)	40

=== Year-end charts ===
1974 year-end chart performance for "Lady of the Night"
Chart (1974)	Position
Belgium (Ultratop 50 Flanders)	96

1975 year-end chart performance for "Lady of the Night"
Chart (1975)	Position
Belgium (Ultratop 50 Flanders)	29
Netherlands (Dutch Top 40)	60
Netherlands (Single Top 100)	60

1976 year-end chart performance for "Lady of the Night"
Chart (1976)	Position
Austria (Ö3 Austria Top 40)	8
