= The Hostage (song) =

- Single picture sleeve in the Netherlands

Single by Donna Summer

from the album Lady of the Night
- B-side: "Let's Work Together Now"
- Released: June 22, 1974
- Genre: Symphonic rock; R&B
- Length: 4:16
- Label: Groovy
- Songwriters: Giorgio Moroder; Pete Bellotte
- Producer: Pete Bellotte

Donna Summer singles chronology
"Denver Dream" (1974)	"The Hostage" (1974)	"Lady of the Night" (1974)

"The Hostage" is a song by American singer Donna Summer from her debut studio album, Lady of the Night (1974), which was released exclusively in the Netherlands. The track was written by Giorgio Moroder and Pete Bellotte, with the latter also serving as producer. It was issued as a 7-inch single in Europe and Asia in 1974, later being included in the German and French versions of Summer's 1975 album Love to Love You Baby. In the lyrics, Summer plays a wife whose husband is kidnapped. By 1978, "The Hostage" had sold 500,000 copies.

== Charts ==
=== Weekly charts ===
Weekly chart performance for "The Hostage"
Chart (1974)	Peak position
Belgium (Ultratop 50 Flanders)	3
Belgium (Ultratop 50 Wallonia)	8
Netherlands (Dutch Top 40)	2
Netherlands (Single Top 100)	2
Spanish Singles Chart	2

=== Year-end charts ===
Year-end chart performance for "The Hostage"
Chart (1974)	Position
Belgium (Ultratop 50 Flanders)	34
Netherlands (Dutch Top 40)	32
Netherlands (Single Top 100)	33
