= Lady of the Night (album) =

Studio album by Donna Summer
- Released: February 26, 1974
- Recorded: July–November 1973
- Genre: Pop; folk-pop; country rock; R&B
- Length: 33:56
- Label: Groovy
- Producer: Pete Bellotte

Donna Summer chronology
Lady of the Night (1974)	Love to Love You Baby (1975)

Singles from Lady of the Night
- 1. "The Hostage" Released: June 22, 1974; 2. "Lady of the Night" Released: November 1974

Professional ratings
Review scores
Source	Rating
AllMusic	2.5/5 stars

Lady of the Night is the debut studio album by American singer Donna Summer, released in the Netherlands on February 26, 1974, by Groovy Records. The album contains such European hits as "The Hostage" and "Lady of the Night".

== Background ==
In 1973, Donna Summer recorded backing vocals for the album of the band Three Dog Night, and while working in the studio she met songwriters and producers Pete Bellotte and Giorgio Moroder. The musicians appreciated the vocal and performing potential and, having weighed the emerging commercial prospects, offered Summer work on her own record. Bellotte acted as producer and in close collaboration with Giorgio Moroder they composed almost the entire array of song material of the album, including the song "The Hostage", released as a lead single from the album. Most of the songs on the album are written in the pop and folk-pop genres.

== Release ==
The album was released only in the Netherlands, and spawned the minor hit singles "The Hostage" and "Lady of the Night" in that country. The first single, "The Hostage", entered the top three charts in Belgium and Spain, and the second single, "Lady of the Night", was also a success, hitting the top ten also in Austria. The album itself failed to chart.

"Full of Emptiness" was excised from all CD reissues, as the track was re-mixed and re-released on her next album, 1975's Love to Love You Baby.

"Little Miss Fit" had been previously released as a single in the Netherlands and West Germany by Dutch singer Debbie in 1973.

== Track listing ==
All tracks are written by Giorgio Moroder and Pete Bellotte; except "Domino", "Let's Work Together Now" and "Sing Along (Sad Song)" by Bellotte.

Side one
No.	Title	Length
1.	"Lady of the Night"	3:58
2.	"Born to Die"	3:24
3.	"Friends"	3:31
4.	"Full of Emptiness"	2:26
5.	"Domino"	3:14
Total length:		16:33

Side two
No.	Title	Length
1.	"The Hostage"	4:16
2.	"Wounded"	2:43
3.	"Little Miss Fit"	3:06
4.	"Let's Work Together Now"	3:58
5.	"Sing Along (Sad Song)"	3:20
Total length:		17:23
