= Donna Summer =

American singer (1948–2012)

- Summer in 1982

Background information
- Also known as: Donna Gaines
- Born: Donna Adrian Gaines; December 31, 1948; Boston, Massachusetts, U.S.
- Died: May 17, 2012 (aged 63) Naples, Florida, U.S.
- Genres: Disco; dance; pop; R&B
- Occupations: Singer; songwriter; actress
- Works: Donna Summer discography
- Years active: 1967–2012
- Labels: Oasis; Casablanca; Geffen; Atlantic; Mercury; WEA; Epic; Durium; Burgundy; United Artists; Island
- Spouses: Helmuth Sommer (m. 1973; div. 1976); Bruce Sudano (m. 1980)
- Children: 3, including Brooklyn and Amanda Sudano
- Website: donnasummer.com

Donna Adrian Gaines (December 31, 1948 – May 17, 2012), known professionally as Donna Summer, was an American singer and songwriter. She gained prominence during the disco era of the 1970s and became known as the "Queen of Disco", while her music gained a global following.

Born and raised in Boston, Summer dropped out of high school before graduating and began her career as the lead singer of a blues rock band named Crow and moved to New York City. In 1968, she joined the German production of the musical Hair in Munich, where she spent several years acting, and singing. There, she met music producers Giorgio Moroder and Pete Bellotte, and recorded her first album, Lady of the Night, released in 1974 only to the European market. Following the recording and European release of the groundbreaking disco anthem, "Love to Love You Baby", she signed with Casablanca Records in 1975, where it was released in North America. In the US, the single became her first top five hit on the Billboard Hot 100, peaking at number 2 in 1976. Summer's first three Casablanca albums—Love to Love You Baby, A Love Trilogy and Four Seasons of Love—all went gold in the US and led to her informal title "First Lady of Love" in the popular music media. Her fourth Casablanca release, I Remember Yesterday (1977), launched the top ten US and number one UK hit "I Feel Love", which has since been hailed as one of the most important records in pop music history. After recording much of her first six albums in Munich with Moroder and Belotte, Summer and the producers relocated to the United States, where Summer would continue to record successful singles such as "Last Dance", "MacArthur Park", "Heaven Knows", "Hot Stuff", "Bad Girls", "Dim All the Lights", "No More Tears (Enough Is Enough)" with Barbra Streisand, and "On the Radio".

Beginning in 1978, Summer first topped the Billboard 200 with the live album, Live and More, thus beginning a streak of three consecutive number one albums, including Bad Girls (1979) and the compilation album, On the Radio: Greatest Hits Volumes I & II (1980). In achieving this, Summer became the first and only artist to have three number one double albums. All three albums were certified platinum or higher in the United States, with Bad Girls selling over two million copies. Summer was the first female artist to record three number one singles in one calendar year, doing so in 1979. Summer's success was interrupted by the late 1970s social backlash against disco music, and in 1980, she left Casablanca Records for Geffen Records. As a response, her next album, The Wanderer, found Summer recording mostly rock and new wave music, as well as inspirational music inspired by her newfound Christian faith. However, her Geffen Records recordings were not as successful as predicted. Summer returned to the top of the pop charts in 1983 with the single, "She Works Hard for the Money", off the album of the same name, which was released off of Mercury Records after it was found she owed Casablanca one more album. Despite this success, Summer's recordings began foundering not too long afterwards. Rumors of homophobic comments she allegedly made at a 1983 concert led to a falling-out with Summer's gay fanbase. In 1989, Summer worked with the team of Stock Aitken Waterman and scored her first top ten US hit in six years with "This Time I Know It's for Real", which would be her fourteenth and final top ten hit of her career. Summer would make the Hot 100 one last time in 1999 with her rendition of "I Will Go with You (Con te partirò)".

Summer continued to record music up until her death in 2012 from lung cancer at her home in Naples, Florida. In her obituary in The Times of London, she was described as the "undisputed queen of the Seventies disco boom" who reached the status of "one of the world's leading female singers." Moroder described Summer's work on the song "I Feel Love" as "really the start of electronic dance" music. Summer has been inducted into several musical institutions during her lifetime and posthumously, including the Hollywood Walk of Fame, the Dance Music Hall of Fame and the National Rhythm & Blues Hall of Fame. In 2013, a year after her death, Summer was inducted into the Rock and Roll Hall of Fame. In December 2016, Billboard ranked her sixth on its list of the "Greatest of All Time Top Dance Club Artists". In 2025, she was inducted into the Songwriters Hall of Fame.

== Early life and career ==
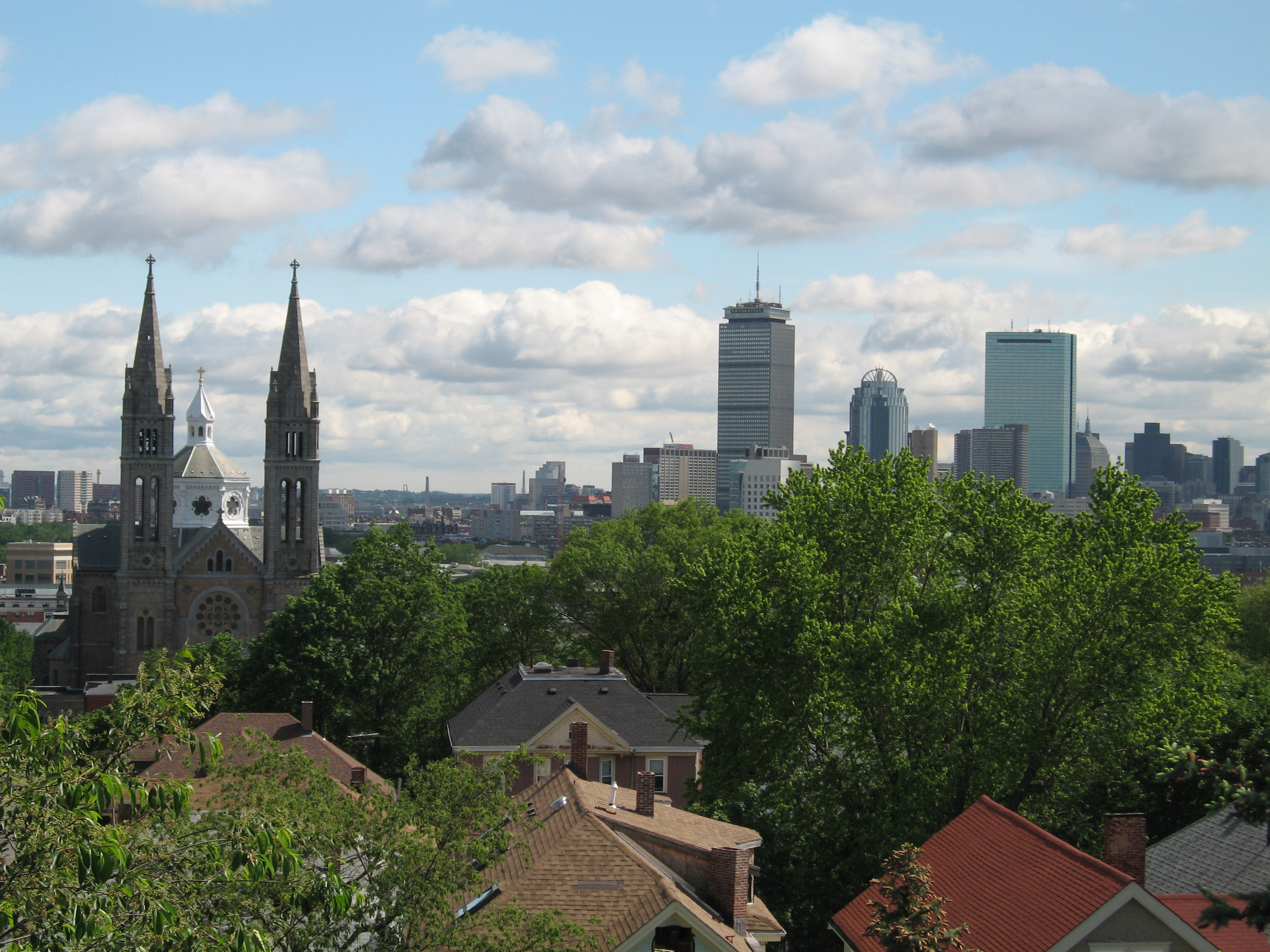
Summer was raised in the Mission Hill neighborhood of Boston.

Donna Adrian Gaines was born in Boston on December 31, 1948, to Andrew and Mary Gaines. She was the third of seven children. She was raised in the Boston neighborhood of Mission Hill. Her father was a butcher, and her mother was a schoolteacher. Some sources claim that her birth name was "LaDonna", but her birth certificate lists her name as "Donna". Her daughter, Brooklyn Sudano, says that "LaDonna" was a childhood nickname.

Summer's performance debut occurred at church when she was ten years old, replacing a vocalist who failed to appear. She attended Boston's Jeremiah E. Burke High School where she performed in school musicals and was considered popular. In 1967, Summer joined the blues rock band Crow. Weeks before she was scheduled to graduate from high school, Summer traveled with the band to New York to secure a record deal. After a record label passed on signing the group since it was only interested in Summer, the group agreed to dissolve.

Summer stayed in New York and auditioned for a role in the counterculture musical, Hair. She landed the part of Sheila and agreed to take the role in the Munich production of the show, moving there in August 1968 after getting her parents' reluctant approval. This decision was arguably what caused Summer's career, along with many of her castmates', to take off. The German cast also included Helga Charlotte Tolle, Reiner Schöne, Ron Williams, Gudrun "Su" Kramer, Elke Koska, Jürgen Markus, Jutta Weinhold and Peter Kent. She eventually became fluent in German, singing various songs in that language, and participated in the musicals Ich bin ich (the German version of The Me Nobody Knows), Godspell, and Show Boat. Within three years, she moved to Vienna, Austria, and joined the Vienna Volksoper.

In 1968, Polydor released Summer's first single, as Donna Gaines, a version of "Aquarius" (sung in German as "Wassermann") from Hair. In 1969, her second single "If You Walkin' Alone" on Philips Records, was released; this was followed in 1971 by a third single, a remake of the Jaynetts' 1963 hit, "Sally Go 'Round the Roses", from a one-off European deal with MCA Records. She provided backing vocals for producer-keyboardist Veit Marvos on his Ariola Records release Nice to See You, credited as "Gayn Pierre". Several subsequent singles included Donna performing with the group, and the name "Gayn Pierre" was used while performing in Godspell with first husband Helmuth Sommer during 1972.

== Music career ==
=== 1974–1976: Initial success ===
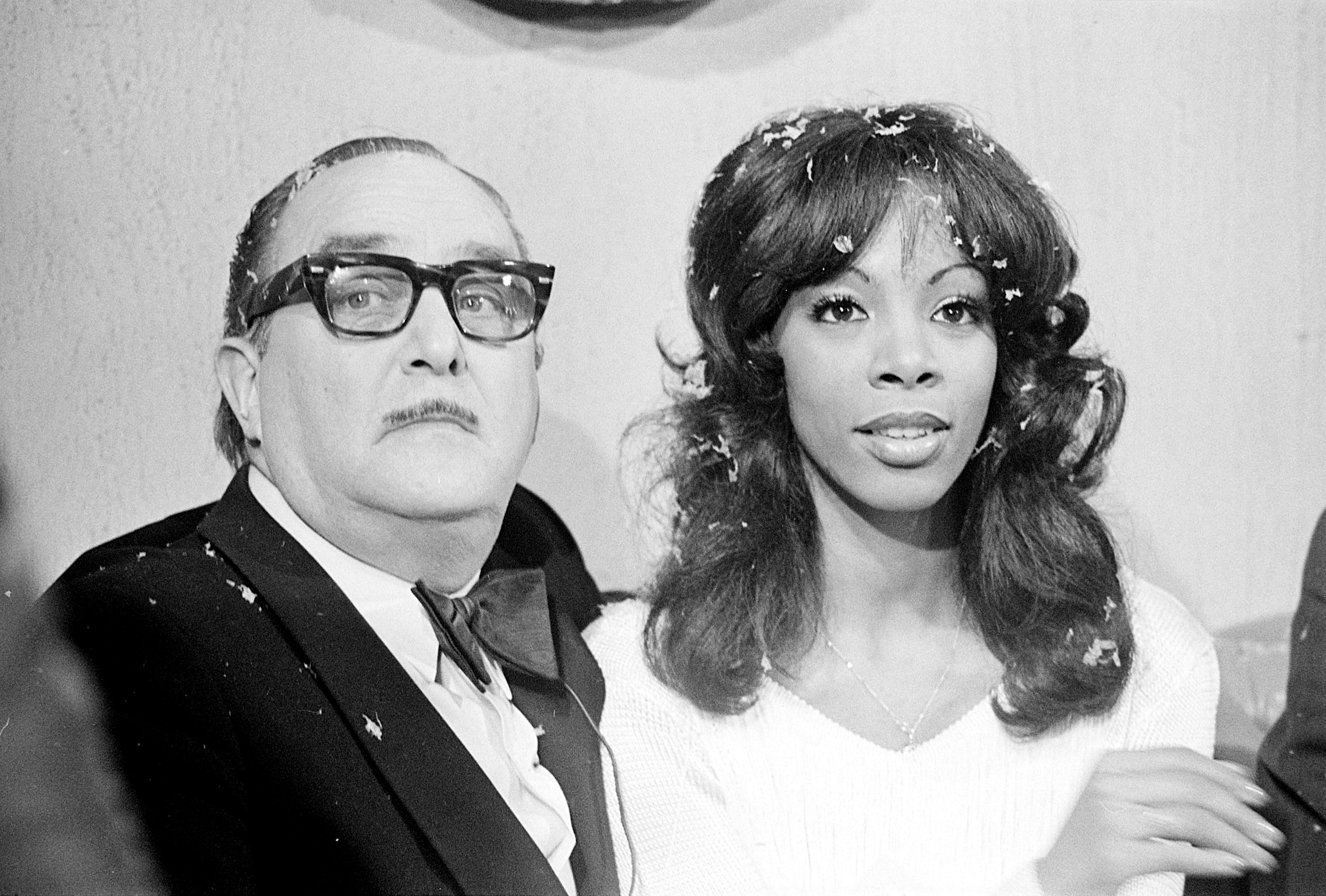
Summer at Van Oekel's Discohoek, 1974

While working as a model part-time and backing singer in Munich, Summer met producers Giorgio Moroder and Pete Bellotte during a recording session for Three Dog Night at Musicland Studios. The trio forged a working partnership and Donna was signed to Moroder's Oasis label in 1974. A demo tape of Summer's work with Moroder and Bellotte led to a deal with the European-distributed label Groovy Records. Due to an error on the record cover, Donna Sommer became Donna Summer; the name stuck. Summer's first album, Lady of the Night, was released in 1974. Unlike the records she would be known for, most of the material on the album had elements of symphonic rock, folk and pop. Though the album itself failed to chart, it spawned two singles, "The Hostage" and the title track. Both songs hit the top ten in various European countries including the Netherlands, Sweden, Germany and Belgium. "The Hostage" was removed from radio playlists in Germany because a high-ranking German politician had recently been kidnapped and held for ransom. One of Summer's first TV appearances was on the Dutch television show Van Oekel's Discohoek, which led to the commercial breakthrough of "The Hostage", and in which she gracefully played along with the show's scripted absurdity and chaos.

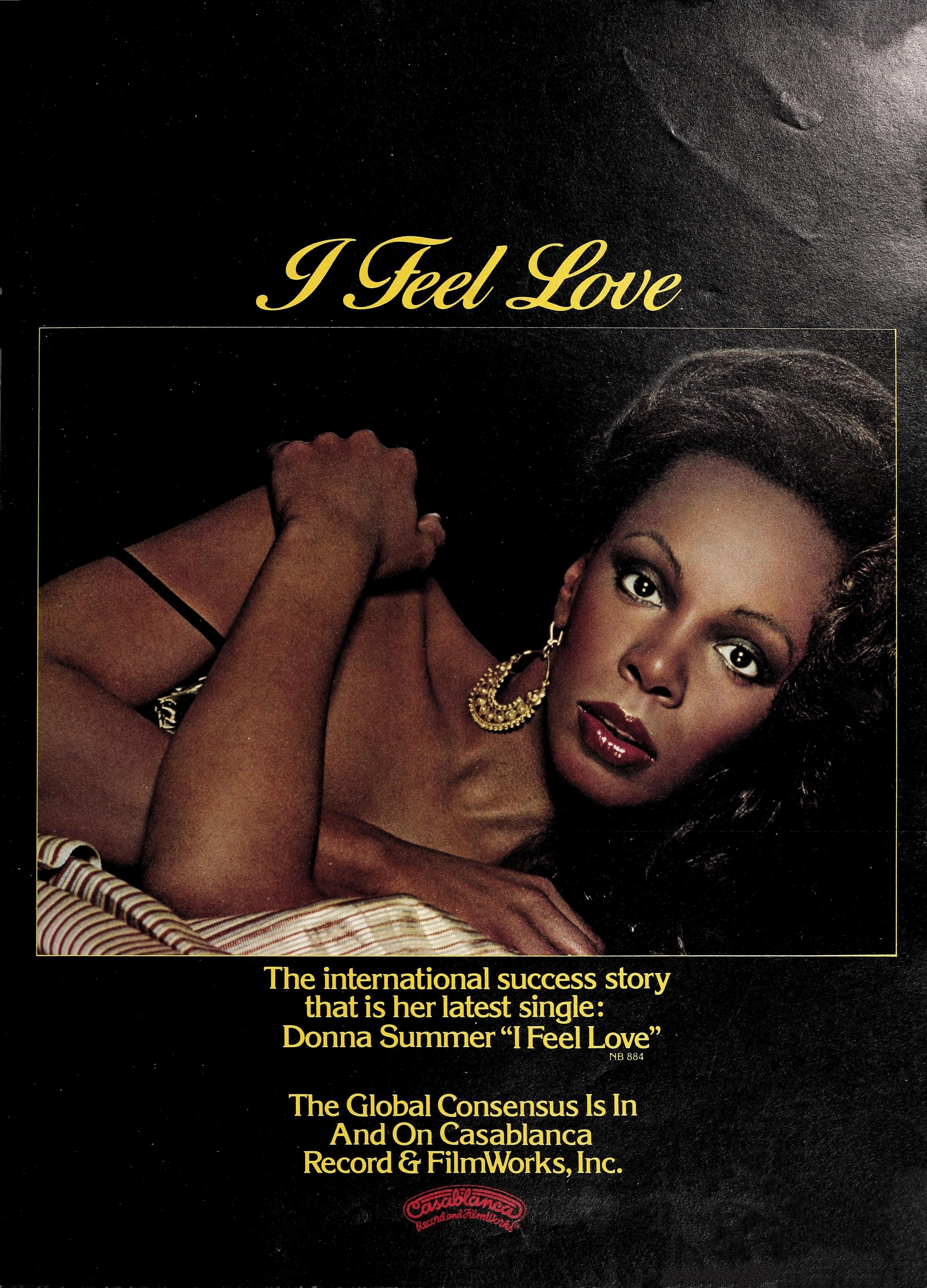
Cashbox advertisement, August 20, 1977

After noticing that disco was rising in Europe during the year Lady of the Night was issued, Moroder and Belotte began to produce a disco song that had yet to have words, until Summer passed on an idea for a song to Moroder that was to be given to another artist, called "Love to Love You", inspired by the successful re-release of Jane Birkin and Serge Gainsbourg's "Je t'aime... moi non plus". It was decided then that Summer recorded a demo of the song with Summer performing the song in a heavily accentuated Marilyn Monroe type voice. However, upon hearing playback, Moroder changed his mind and decided that the Summer version should be released instead. In 1975, Moroder sent the song to several American record labels, hoping to seek a deal and soon grabbed the attention of Neil Bogart, president of Casablanca Records. Upon playing the song at extravagant industry parties, the song was so popular that it was played repeatedly throughout the night. The impresario soon demanded that Moroder produce a longer version for discothèques. A 16-minute version was soon sent and Bogart tweaked the title, changing it from "Love to Love You" to "Love to Love You Baby". Oasis was soon given a distribution deal with Casablanca in July 1975 and the album of the same name was released the following month. The single wouldn't receive a full commercial release until November where it was issued in the United States, with the shorter 7" version playing on radio and the 16-minute version playing in discos.

The song became Summer's first entry into the Billboard Hot 100 and peaked at number two on the chart in February 1976 and became her first gold-certified single. The album would also be certified gold for selling over a million copies alone in the US. The song generated controversy due to Summer's moans and groans, which emulated lovemaking, and some American stations, like those in Europe with the initial release, refused to play it. Despite this, "Love to Love You Baby" found chart success in several European countries, and made the Top 5 in the United Kingdom despite the song being banned in the BBC. Almost immediately afterwards, Casablanca ordered a series of albums to follow its success. In 1976, Summer issued two more albums—A Love Trilogy and Four Seasons of Love—which, despite it charting lower than Love to Love You Baby, would also be certified gold in the United States. Summer's immediate single follow-ups after "Love to Love You Baby"—a cover of Barry Manilow's "Could It Be Magic", "Try Me, I Know We Can Make It", "Spring Affair" and "Winter Melody", the latter being her first ballad, recorded under the soul style and her first US release where she was belting, rather than singing in soprano—failed to reach the top 40 of the Billboard Hot 100. During this era, Summer appeared on the dance shows, American Bandstand and Soul Train.

=== 1977–1979: Breakthrough success ===
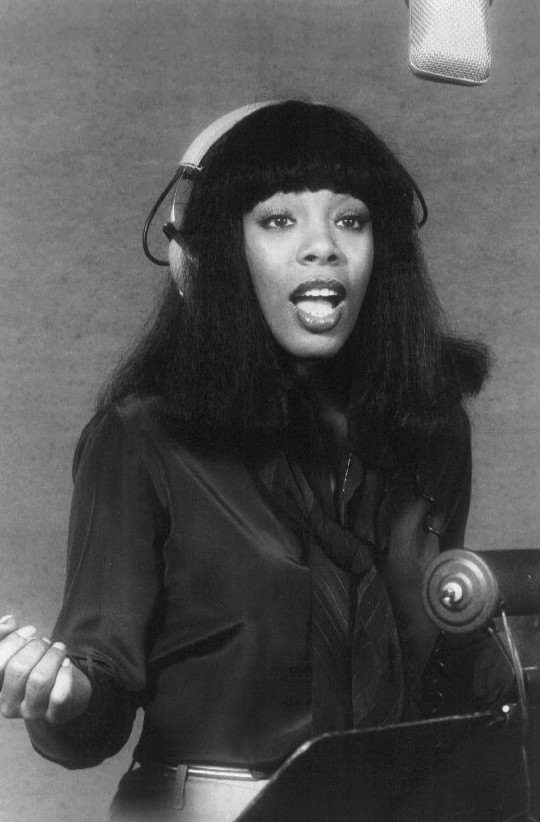
Summer in a recording studio in September 1977

In 1977, Summer released the concept album I Remember Yesterday. The futuristic-sounding "I Feel Love" returned Summer to the top ten of the Billboard Hot 100, peaking at number six, while becoming her first and only number-one single in the UK. The single became her second to go gold, while I Remember Yesterday was also a certified hit and was her first since Love to Love You Baby to crack the top 20 of the Billboard 200. This success helped Summer receive her first American Music Award nomination for Favorite Soul/R&B Female Artist. Another concept album, Once Upon a Time, quickly followed, and much like Summer's previous albums before, it also was certified gold for selling over a million copies. Once Upon a Time hit number one on the Billboard National Disco Action chart, while the single "I Love You" barely cracked the top 40 in the US and reached number 10 in the UK. Many of Summer's most successful singles during this era were in the UK, with Summer charting top 20 hits there such as "Down Deep Inside" (the theme song from the 1977 film The Deep), "I Remember Yesterday" and "Love's Unkind", which peaked at number three.

By 1978, Summer had fully resettled in the United States after having split time between there and Munich, where many of her albums were recorded. She accepted her first film role for the disco-themed Thank God It's Friday and contributed three songs to its soundtrack, including the Paul Jabara-composed "Last Dance". The latter returned Summer to the top ten of the US Billboard Hot 100, peaking at number three while reaching number five on the Hot Soul Singles chart and topping the National Disco Action chart, her second single to do so. "Last Dance" became one of Summer's signature songs and won the singer her first Grammy Award for Best Female R&B Vocal Performance. Jabara won the Golden Globe and Academy Award for its composition. This was the first of eight consecutive top five hit records Summer would have over the next two years.

On November 11, 1978, Summer scored her first number-one single on the Billboard Hot 100 with her rendition of the Jimmy Webb ballad "MacArthur Park", which topped the chart for three weeks and became her fourth gold-certified single; of Webb's many Hot 100 hits during the 1960s and 1970s, it was his only number one. On that same day, Summer's first live album, Live and More, topped the Billboard 200, her first album to do so. Summer became just the second solo black female artist to simultaneously have the number-one single and album in the US. Live and More became her first album to be certified platinum in the US. Before the end of the year, Summer released "Heaven Knows", a collaborative song with Brooklyn Dreams lead singer Joe "Bean" Esposito. It peaked at number four on the Hot 100 in early 1979. On January 9, 1979, Summer performed the ballad "Mimi's Song" on the globally televised Music for UNICEF Concert special, which aimed at raising funds and awareness for children across the globe. On January 12, Summer won three American Music Awards, all in the disco category, at its 6th annual ceremony.

=== 1979–1980: Bad Girls and fallout with Casablanca ===
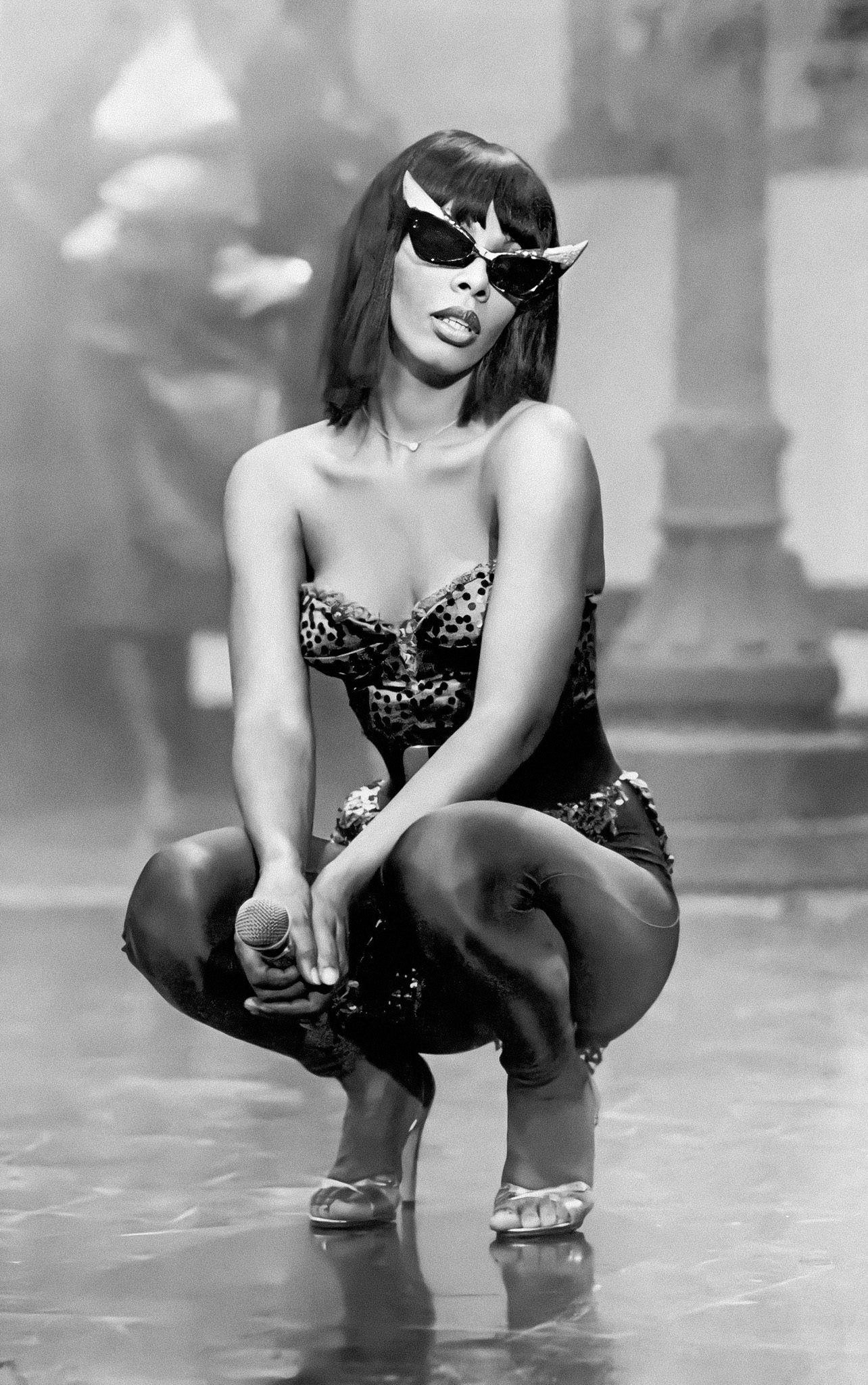
Summer performing "Bad Girls" during The Donna Summer Special, 1980

At the tail-end of 1978, Summer, Moroder and Belotte began working on her seventh studio album, Bad Girls. Noting the rise of punk rock and heavy metal music, the producers and Summer sought to go for a rockier edge on some of the songs while other songs leaned into Summer's R&B roots. Harold Faltermeyer, with whom Moroder had collaborated on the film, Midnight Express, was brought in to be the arranger of the album. Released on April 25, 1979, Bad Girls became an immediate success. The first single, "Hot Stuff", became Summer's second number one single on the Hot 100, followed by the title track, the latter of which helped Summer make history as the first female artist of the rock era to send two songs simultaneously to the top five of the Billboard Hot 100 and later topped the Hot 100 itself for a five-week run. On June 16, the album became Summer's second number one on the Billboard 200; on that same date, "Hot Stuff" had returned to number one on the Hot 100. The album would be Summer's longest-running number one album at six weeks. It also became Summer's first to top the Top Soul LPs chart, with the title track also becoming Summer's first to top the Hot Soul Singles chart. The album would go on to be certified double-platinum in the United States for sales of over two million copies in the US and sell four million units worldwide. At the time, it was the most successful album by a black female artist in history until the releases of Tina Turner's Private Dancer and Whitney Houston's self-titled debut in the 1980s.

During promotion of the album, Summer collaborated with Barbra Streisand on the Paul Jabara composition, "No More Tears (Enough is Enough)", which was featured on Streisand's Wet album. Around the same time, Summer sought to release "Dim All the Lights", which was the first solo composition of her career, and had hoped she would earn a number one pop single as a songwriter. However, Casablanca Records president Neil Bogart was reportedly more enthusiastic about the release of "No More Tears". Both songs became hits and appeared in the top five of the Billboard Hot 100 simultaneously, repeating what Summer had done earlier in the year. "Dim All the Lights", however, peaked at number two while "No More Tears" peaked at number one. And while Summer achieved another historic feat by becoming the first female artist to have three number one singles in a calendar year and having recorded seven consecutive top ten hits by then, Summer was angry that Bogart refused to promote "Dim All the Lights" more, leading to a rift between the artist and Casablanca Records.

Bad Girls resulted in multiple award wins and nominations for Summer. In January 1980, the artist won three more American Music Awards including Favorite Pop/Rock Female Artist. At the 1980 Grammy Awards, Summer received the first Grammy Award in the category of Best Female Rock Vocal Performance for "Hot Stuff", however, she lost the Album of the Year category to Billy Joel's 52nd Street. During 1979, Summer played eight sold-out shows at the Universal Amphitheater in Los Angeles. In October, Casablanca released the first worldwide greatest hits compilation set, On the Radio: Greatest Hits Volumes I & II. The album was remixed with each song on the compilation segueing into the next, featuring "No More Tears" and a newer song, "On the Radio", which was featured in the soundtrack to the film, Foxes. The title track became another top ten hit for Summer, reaching number 5 in early 1980, while the compilation topped the Billboard 200 on January 5. Like her previous albums, the album would be certified platinum.

On January 27, 1980, Summer had her own nationally televised special, The Donna Summer Special, which aired on ABC. At this point, Casablanca had wanted Summer to continue releasing singles off the Bad Girls album but Summer reportedly wanted to venture out of the genre to record her own songs. Summer sought a new recording deal, later signing with David Geffen's recently formed Geffen label. Summer later sued Casablanca for $10 million, leading to a countersuit. Summer would end up settling with Casablanca with rights to her song publishings.

=== 1980–1985: She Works Hard for the Money and issues with Geffen ===
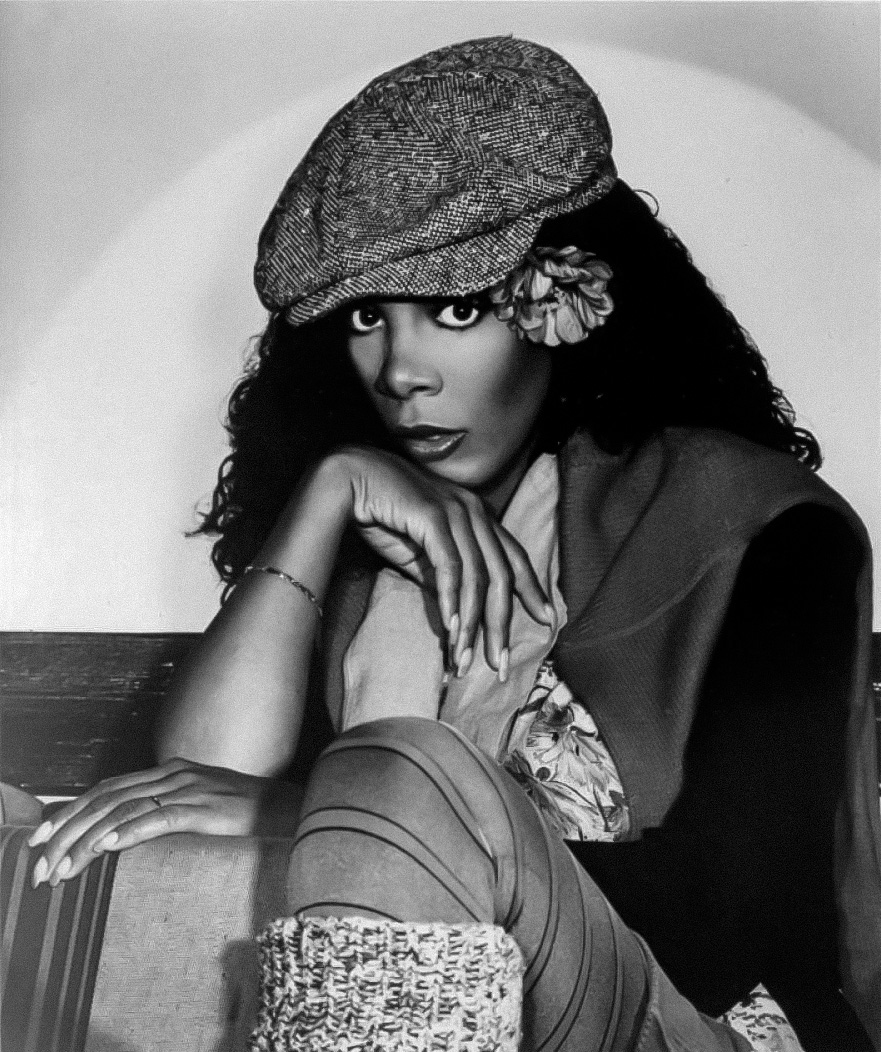
Donna Summer during the photoshoot for her first Geffen Records album, The Wanderer, 1980.

By the time that Summer signed with Geffen, disco music was already experiencing a significant sociopolitical backlash from the American record-buying public. Some US radio stations, wanting a return to more rock-oriented material, began banning any urban-sounding dance single from the airwaves, which led to many careers that thrived in the disco and soul music eras to fade from the American charts.

Summer, who had desired to record different music, took the opportunity to do so on her first Geffen release, The Wanderer, which featured elements of rock, new wave and inspirational music. Prior to releasing the first single, which was the title track, Summer's former label Casablanca released "Walk Away" from the Bad Girls album to compete with it. "Walk Away" is notable for ending Summer's consecutive top five streak on the Billboard Hot 100, peaking at number 36. Despite this, "The Wanderer" became a hit, peaking at number three. However, the album itself was only moderately successful, peaking at number 13 on the Billboard 200. The album's follow-ups, "Cold Love" and "Who Do You Think You're Foolin'" barely reached the top 40. Still, The Wanderer became Summer's ninth consecutive gold-certified album in the United States. At the 33rd Annual Grammy Awards, Summer won nominations for Best Female Rock Vocal Performance ("Cold Love") and Best Inspirational Performance ("I Believe in Jesus").

In 1981, Summer, Moroder and Belotte had set to work on the next Geffen release. In the middle of production, David Geffen stopped by the studio to preview the album and was told that while the album was a work in progress that it was close to being done. But Geffen, having heard only a few of the finished tracks and others still in demo form, felt the album "wasn't good enough" and cancelled the project. Later, that album would be released under the title, I'm a Rainbow. Geffen felt Summer's music should be aimed more at black audiences and had the singer work with Quincy Jones on what would be her second Geffen release, the eponymously titled Donna Summer album, which was released in 1982. The project was recorded under difficult circumstances for Summer. That year, she was pregnant with her and Bruce Sudano's second child and in May, and Neil Bogart died from a bout with cancer at 39. Despite their acrimonious split, Summer sang at Bogart's funeral.

Upon the release of Donna Summer, the album peaked inside the top 20 and produced the top ten hit, "Love Is in Control (Finger on the Trigger)" but, much like The Wanderer before it, its subsequent follow-ups—a cover of the Jon and Vangelis song "State of Independence" and "The Woman in Me"—failed to match it, with "State of Independence" becoming her first single since "Rumour Has It" to not crack the top 40. Around this time, Geffen had been notified by Polygram Records, which now owned Casablanca, that Summer still needed to deliver to them one more album to fulfill her contract. The result was the album, She Works Hard for the Money, produced by Michael Omartian, and released in 1983 on Mercury Records. The title track returned her to the top five of the Hot 100 in three years, peaking at number three, while becoming her second number one single on the Black Singles chart, where it stayed for three weeks. It received a Grammy nomination for Best Female Pop Vocal Performance. The video, directed by Brian Grant, was one of the first times that a black female artist had a video clip spinning on heavy rotation on MTV doing so on the week of August 10, 1983, remaining on heavy rotation for six weeks. Summer later was nominated for Best Female Video at the inaugural MTV Video Music Awards ceremony, losing to Cyndi Lauper's "Girls Just Want to Have Fun". Grant later directed Summer's Costa Mesa HBO concert special, A Hot Summers Night. She Works Hard for the Money peaked at number 9 on the Billboard 200 and would become Summer's eleventh and final album to be certified gold in the United States. Unlike The Wanderer, the follow-ups on the album—"Unconditional Love" and "Love Has a Mind of Its Own"—didn't hit the top 40. The ballad, "He's a Rebel", won the singer her third Grammy for Best Inspirational Performance.

Due to his success on She Works Hard for the Money, Geffen hired Michael Omartian to produce Summer's next Geffen release, Cats Without Claws. Though Summer was happy Geffen stayed out of the studio during its recording and thanked him on the album's liner notes, Geffen refused her request to release the track, "Oh Billy Please", for a lead single, choosing to go with her cover of the Drifters' "There Goes My Baby" instead. Cats Without Claws was released on September 11, 1984 and peaked at number 40 on the Billboard 200, her lowest to chart in her career at the time. It was the first Summer album to not go gold in the United States. "There Goes My Baby" was also only a modest hit, reaching number 21 on the Billboard Hot 100, her first leading single to not reach the top ten since 1977. The video received heavy rotation on MTV but soon faded from the channel, thus becoming her last video to receive such success. The second single, "Supernatural Love", flopped, peaking at number 75 on the Billboard Hot 100 with the video receiving only light rotation on MTV, becoming her last video to air on the channel. Summer earned her fourth Grammy in the inspirational category for the song "Forgive Me" on the album. On January 19, 1985, Summer's sang at the nationally televised 50th Presidential Inaugural Gala the day before the second inauguration of Ronald Reagan.

=== 1986–1989: All Systems Go, Another Place and Time and addressing homophobic rumors ===
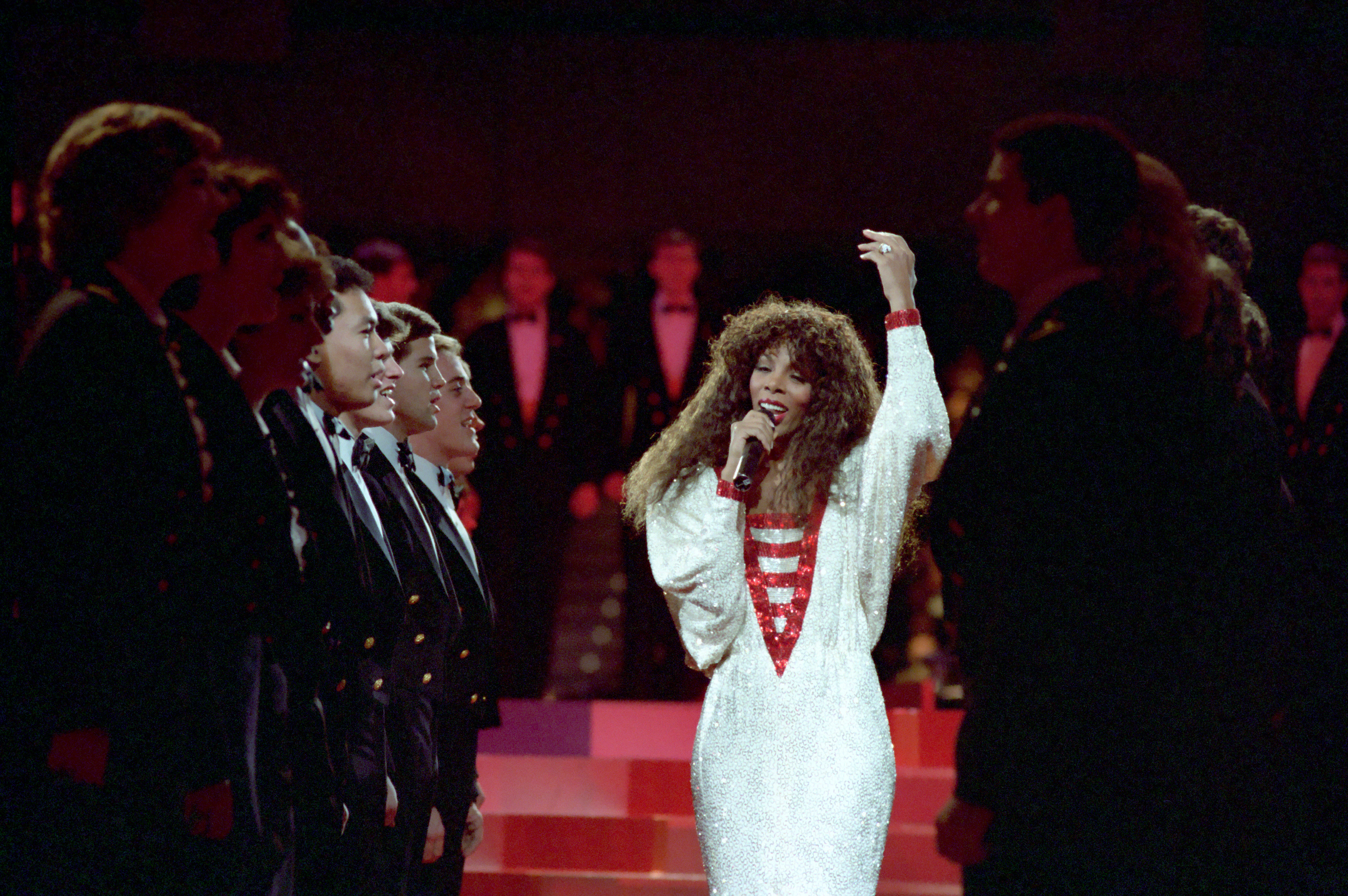
Donna Summer performing at the inaugural gala for Ronald Reagan at the Convention Center in Washington DC in 1985

In 1986, Harold Faltermeyer wrote the title song for the German ski film Fire and Ice, and thought Summer would be ideal to sing the song. He contacted Summer, who declined to perform the song but expressed interest in collaborating with Faltermeyer again. After a meeting with Geffen, the impresario was on board with the project. Summer's main objective for the album was that it have stronger R&B influences; Faltermeyer who had just finished doing the soundtracks to Top Gun and Fletch, was after a tough FM-oriented sound. On completion, Geffen liked what he heard, but his executives did not think there were enough songs that could be deemed singles. They wanted Faltermeyer to produce "Dinner with Gershwin", but he was already busy with another project, so another producer was found. They also substituted a previous recording called "Bad Reputation", songs like "Fascination", fell by the wayside. Geffen had shared the vision of moving Summer into the R&B market as a veteran artist, but these expectations were not met. Faltermeyer, in a 2012 interview with Daeida Magazine, said, "She was an older artist by then and the label's priority may have been on the youth market. The decision was made afterward by executives who were looking for a radio hit for 1987 and not something that would perhaps last beyond then." Label president Ed Rosenblatt would later admit: "The company never intended to focus on established superstars". The album All Systems Go became Summer's lowest charting studio album on the Billboard 200 to date, reaching number 122. The single "Dinner with Gershwin" stalled at 48 in the US, though it became a hit in the UK, reaching number 13; the title track reached 54 in the same country.

For Summer's next album, Geffen Records hired the British production team of Stock Aitken Waterman (SAW), who enjoyed success writing and producing for such acts as Kylie Minogue, Bananarama, and Rick Astley, among others. The SAW team described the working experience as a "labor of love", and said it was their favorite album of all that they had recorded. Geffen decided not to release the album Another Place and Time, and Summer and the label parted ways in 1988. The album was released in Europe in March 1989 on Warner Bros. Records, which had been Summer's label in Europe since 1982. The single "This Time I Know It's for Real" became a top ten hit in several countries in Europe, prompting Warner Bros.' sister company, Atlantic Records, to sign Summer in the US. The single peaked at number 7 on the Billboard Hot 100, becoming her first top ten single in six years, her fourteenth top ten hit in general, and her last; it also became her twelfth single to be certified gold in the US. Despite this, there was no successful follow-ups in the US and the album also declined to gold in Summer's home country, though in the UK, the album would be certified gold and produced two more hits in the country, "I Don't Wanna Get Hurt" and "Love's About to Change My Heart", reaching numbers 7 and 20, respectively. During the same year of that album's release, Summer and husband Sudano had been in talks to do a new kind of reality-based sitcom. It would be based on their own hectic household. At the time, they lived with their children Amanda, Brooklyn and Mimi, two sets of in-laws, and a maid. The television network started changing the premise of the show, making it less funny. Sudano added, "and because we were an interracial couple, they didn't want us to be married anymore". In 1989, this was "an issue. So with that mentality we just backed out of it."

Summer's 1989 apology letter to ACT UP

That same year, Summer was interviewed for the LGBTQ magazine The Advocate and addressed claims made by Village Voice reporter Jim Feldman that she had made homophobic remarks at an Atlantic City concert back in 1983. According to Feldman, Summer had told the crowd that AIDS "was God's divine punishment against gays" and that "God made Adam and Eve, not Adam and Steve." Summer told the publication, "I never said, 'If you are gay, God hates you.' Come on... Be real. I don't understand that. Anybody who really knows me knows I wouldn't say that." That July, ACT UP activists at a Boston Gay Pride event protested the playing of a Donna Summer song, chanting, "Shame, shame, shame!"

On July 26, 1989, Summer sent a letter to ACT UP apologizing for the statements, adding that they were "a terrible misunderstanding". She closed the letter with a quote from the Bible (chapter 13 of 1 Corinthians). Two years later, in 1991, Summer sued New York magazine when it printed an old story about the rumors as fact. Eventually the suit was settled by both parties in 1995.

=== 1990–1999: Mistaken Identity, Family Matters, and Live & More Encore ===
Summer's 1990 Warner compilation, The Best of Donna Summer went gold following the re-release of "State of Independence" while a remix of the 1989 track, "Breakaway", released from the same compilation, became a hit in Latin America. Despite this success, Summer rejected her husband's advice that she should record a second album with Stock Aitken Waterman, insisting that she wanted to make an R&B record. Summer worked on her Warner follow-up, Mistaken Identity, with Keith Diamond, which was released to poor reception in 1991. Despite scoring a top 20 Billboard R&B hit with the new jack swing-styled ballad "When Love Cries", Mistaken Identity failed to chart on the Billboard 200 and only managed to peak at number 97 on the R&B Albums chart.

In 1992, Summer received a star on the Hollywood Walk of Fame. That year, Summer reunited with Giorgio Moroder on the song "Carry On"; six years later, a remixed version won Summer a Grammy Award for Best Dance Recording. In 1994, Summer released her first holiday album, Christmas Spirit. Summer returned to the UK top 40 with the song "Melody of Love (Wanna Be Loved)". That same year, Summer made the first of two appearances on Family Matters as Steve Urkel's (Jaleel White) Aunt Oona, appearing on the show's fifth season episode, "Aunt Oona". Three years later, in 1997, Summer returned as Aunt Oona on the show's eighth season episode, "Pound Foolish".

In 1999, Summer was asked to do the VH1 Divas Live '99 concert special, which featured other music legends such as Cher, Tina Turner and Whitney Houston. However, after meeting up with the show's producers, it was decided Summer would do her own concert special, which later was taped for VH1 titled Donna Summer – Live & More Encore. It would become the second highest-viewed show for the network that year after VH1 Divas Live '99. A subsequent live album of the event was released by Epic Records and featured two studio songs, "I Will Go with You (Con te partirò)" and "Love Is the Healer", both of which reached No. 1 on the US dance charts. The former track returned her to the Billboard Hot 100, peaking at number 79. It would be Summer's 32nd and final Hot 100 entry.

=== 2000–2009: Later recordings and Crayons ===
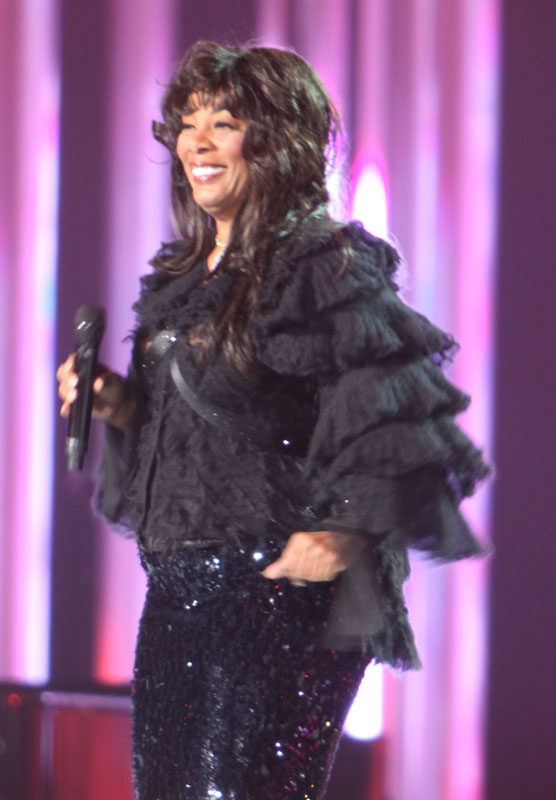
Summer performing at the Nobel Peace Prize Concert 2009

In 2000, Summer participated in VH1's third annual Divas special, dedicated to Diana Ross; she sang the Supremes hit "Reflections", and her own material for the show. "The Power of One" is a theme song for the movie Pokémon: The Movie 2000. The dramatic ballad was produced by David Foster and dance remixes were also issued to DJs and became another dance floor success for Summer, peaking at No. 2 on the same chart in 2000. In 2003, Summer issued her autobiography, Ordinary Girl: The Journey, and released a best-of set titled The Journey: The Very Best of Donna Summer. In 2004, Summer was inducted into the Dance Music Hall of Fame as an artist, alongside the Bee Gees and Barry Gibb. Her classic song, "I Feel Love", was inducted that night as well. In 2004 and 2005, Summer's success on the dance charts continued with the songs "You're So Beautiful" and "I Got Your Love". In 2004, Summer re-recorded 'No More Tears (Enough Is Enough)' with the Irish pop band Westlife (with a live performance) for the compilation album, DiscoMania.

In 2008, Summer released her first studio album of fully original material in 17 years, entitled Crayons. Released on the Sony BMG label Burgundy Records, it peaked at No. 17 on the US Top 200 Album Chart, her highest placing on the chart since 1983. The songs "I'm a Fire", "Stamp Your Feet" and "Fame (The Game)" all reached No. 1 on the US Billboard Dance Chart. The ballad "Sand on My Feet" was released to adult contemporary stations and reached No. 30 on that chart. Summer said, "I wanted this album to have a lot of different directions on it. I did not want it to be any one baby. I just wanted it to be a sampler of flavors and influences from all over the world. There's a touch of this, a little smidgeon of that, a dash of something else, like when you're cooking." On December 11, 2009, Donna Summer appeared at the Nobel Peace Prize Concert for Barack Obama.

=== 2010–present: Final recordings and posthumous releases ===
On July 29, 2010, Summer gave an interview with Allvoices.com wherein she was asked if she would consider doing an album of standards. She said, "I actually am, probably in September. I will begin work on a standards album. I will probably do an all-out dance album and a standards album. I'm going to do both and we will release them however we're going to release them. We are not sure which is going first."

In August 2010, Summer released the single "To Paris With Love", co-written with Bruce Roberts and produced by Peter Stengaard. The single went to No. 1 on the US Billboard Dance Chart in October 2010. That month, Summer also appeared on the PBS television special Hitman Returns: David Foster and Friends. In it, Summer performed with Seal on a medley of the songs "Un-Break My Heart", "Crazy", and "On the Radio" before closing the show with "Last Dance". On September 15, 2010, Summer appeared as a guest celebrity, singing alongside contestant Prince Poppycock, on the television show America's Got Talent. Also in 2010, Summer recorded a version of the Dan Fogelberg song "Nether Lands" for a Fogelberg tribute project. According to a comment on Fogelberg's website, the song had great personal significance for Summer.

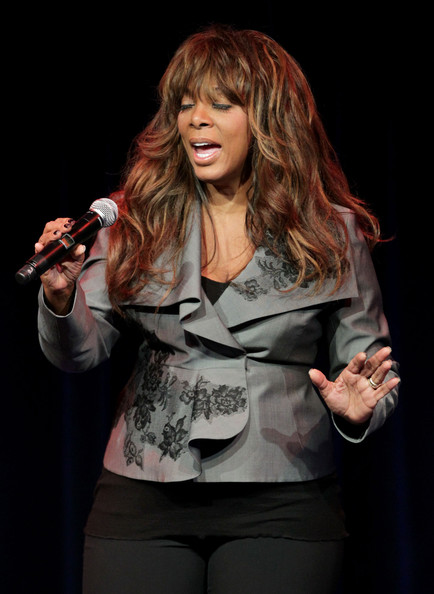
Summer in 2011

On June 6, 2011, Summer was a guest judge on the show Platinum Hit, in an episode entitled "Dance Floor Royalty". In July of that same year, Summer was working at Paramount Recording Studios in Los Angeles with her nephew, the rapper and producer O'Mega Red. Together they worked on a track titled "Angel". On December 11, 2012, after four prior nominations, Summer was posthumously announced to be one of the 2013 inductees to the Rock and Roll Hall of Fame, and was inducted on April 18, 2013, at Los Angeles' Nokia Theater.

A remix album titled Love to Love You Donna, containing new remixes of some of Summer's classics, was released in October 2013. "MacArthur Park" was remixed by Laidback Luke for the remix collection; it was also remixed by Ralphi Rosario, which version was released to dance clubs all over America and successfully peaked at No. 1, giving Summer her first posthumous number-one single, and her sixteenth number-one on the charts. In 2021, Summer's estate released a reedited version of her ninth studio album I'm a Rainbow, subtitled Recovered & Recoloured. The new edition is reduced to 10 tracks (15 on vinyl and streaming releases), with each song remixed by contemporary producers and remixers. Her self-titled album was re-released in 2022 by Summer's estate subtitled as 40th Anniversary Edition.

In 2023, Summer's She Works Hard For The Money album was re-released with additional mixes to commemorate the album's 40th anniversary. That same year, a documentary revolving around Summer and her career, Love to Love You, Donna Summer, directed by her daughter, Brooklyn Sudano and Roger Ross Williams had its world premiere at the 73rd Berlin International Film Festival in February 2023, and was released in May 2023, on HBO.

In 2025, Summer's Cats Without Claws was also re-released in celebration of its 40th anniversary, debuting on two U.K. charts. Later that year, music producer and songwriter Toby Gad released Summer's single "Run", which was recorded in 2008 as part of Summer's final studio album Crayons but never released. Summer and Gad worked on the single together shortly before her death. The song gave Summer her first posthumous Billboard hit after it debuted and peaked at number 30 on the Billboard adult contemporary charts, making it her first entry on the chart since "Sand on My Feet" peaked in the same position in 2008.

== Personal life ==
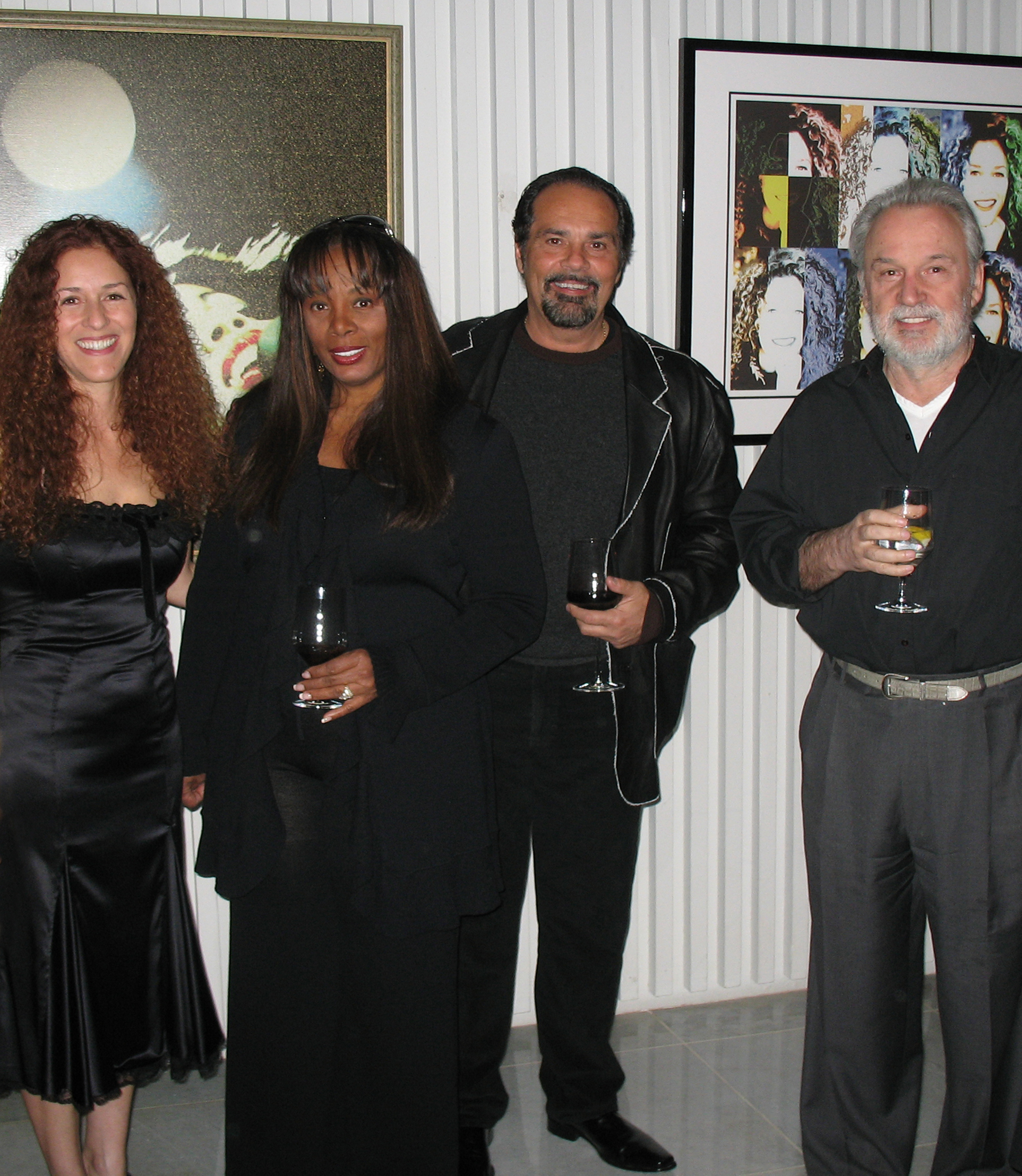
Photo from 2007, with (left to right) Francisca Gutierrez, wife of Summer's longtime collaborator Giorgio Moroder, Summer, her husband Bruce Sudano, and Moroder

Summer was raised in the African Methodist Episcopal Church.

Around 1979–80, Summer became a born-again Christian. Her religious conversion made it difficult to record music that Summer considered risque at the time.

Summer is reportedly a distant cousin of fellow singer Bobby Brown, whose family was raised in the Roxbury area of Boston in the 1960s and 1970s.

She married Helmuth Sommer in 1973, and gave birth to their daughter, Natalia Pia Melanie "Mimi" Sommer, the same year. Summer first began performing under the name "Donna Sommer", which later changed to "Donna Summer"; the latter spelling was the one used when her first single, "The Hostage", was released in 1974. In 1976, after three years of marriage, she and Helmuth Sommer divorced.

Summer married Brooklyn Dreams singer-guitarist Bruce Sudano on July 16, 1980. They had two daughters together, Brooklyn Sudano and Amanda Sudano. The couple remained married until Summer's death.

Summer was one of the founding members of Oasis Church in Los Angeles.

Summer and her family moved from the Sherman Oaks area of Los Angeles to Nashville, Tennessee, in 1995, where she took time off from show business to focus on painting, a hobby she had developed in the 1980s.

== Death ==
Summer died on May 17, 2012, aged 63, at her home in Naples, Florida, from lung cancer. Being a nonsmoker, Summer thought that the cancer had been caused by inhaling toxic fumes and dust from the September 11 attacks in New York City; she was in her apartment near Ground Zero when the attacks occurred. However, some reports have instead attributed the cancer possibly to Summer's smoking during her younger years, her continued exposure to second-hand smoke while performing in clubs well after she had herself quit the habit, and a genetic predisposition in her family.

Summer's funeral service was held in Christ Presbyterian Church in Nashville, on the afternoon of May 23, 2012. The exact location and time of the service were kept private. Several hundred of Summer's friends and relatives attended the funeral, according to CNN. The funeral was a private ceremony, and cameras were not allowed inside the church. She was interred in the Harpeth Hills Memory Gardens cemetery in Nashville.

=== Reactions ===
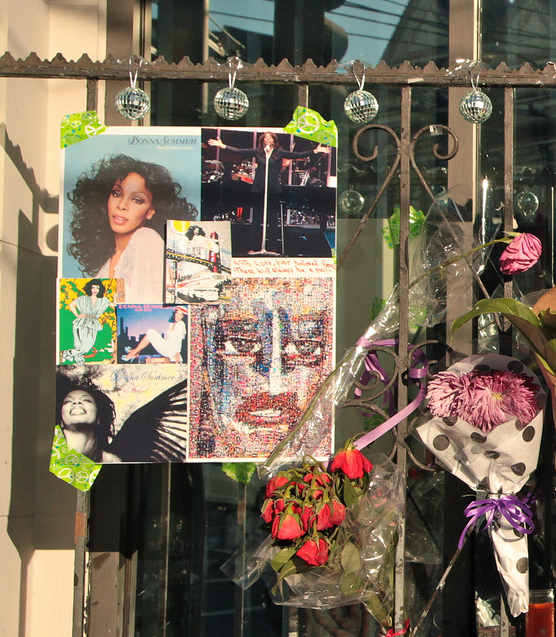
Fan memorial to Summer in the Castro District, San Francisco

Singers and music industry professionals around the world reacted to Summer's death. Gloria Gaynor said she was "deeply saddened" and that Summer was "a fine lady and human being". Liza Minnelli said, "She was a queen, The Queen Of Disco, and we will be dancing to her music forever." She said that her "thoughts and prayers are with her family always." Dolly Parton said, "Donna, like Whitney, was one of the greatest voices ever. I loved her records. She was the disco queen and will remain so. I knew her and found her to be one of the most likable and fun people ever. She will be missed and remembered."

Janet Jackson wrote that Summer "changed the world of music with her beautiful voice and incredible talent." Barbra Streisand wrote, "I loved doing the duet with her. She had an amazing voice and was so talented. It's so sad." Quincy Jones wrote that Summer's voice was "the heartbeat and soundtrack of a generation."

Aretha Franklin said, "It's so shocking to hear about the passing of Donna Summer. In the 1970s, she reigned over the disco era and kept the disco jumping. Who will forget 'Last Dance'? A fine performer and a very nice person." Chaka Khan said, "Donna and I had a friendship for over 30 years. She is one of the few black women I could speak German with and she is one of the few friends I had in this business." Gloria Estefan averred that "It's the end of an era", and posted a photo of herself with Summer. Mary J. Blige said that Summer was "truly a game changer". Lenny Kravitz wrote "Rest in peace Donna, You are a pioneer and you have paved the way for so many of us. You transcended race and genre. Respect. Lenny".

Beyoncé wrote a personal note: "Donna Summer made music that moved me both emotionally and physically to get up and dance. You could always hear the deep passion in her voice. She was so much more than the queen of disco she became known for, she was an honest and gifted singer with flawless vocal talent. I've always been a huge fan and was honored to sample one of her songs. She touched many generations and will be sadly missed. My love goes out to her family during this difficult time. Love, B".

David Foster said, "My wife and I are in shock and truly devastated. Donna changed the face of pop culture forever. There is no doubt that music would sound different today if she had never graced us with her talent. She was a super-diva and a true superstar who never compromised when it came to her career or her family. She always did it with class, dignity, grace and zero attitude. She lived in rare air ... She was the most spectacular, considerate, constant, giving, generous and loving friend of 35 years. I am at a total loss trying to process this tragic news."

US President Barack Obama said, "Michelle and I were saddened to hear about the passing of Donna Summer. A five-time Grammy Award winner, Donna truly was the 'Queen of Disco.' Her voice was unforgettable and the music industry has lost a legend far too soon. Our thoughts and prayers go out to Donna's family and her dedicated fans."

Summer was honored at the 2012 Billboard Music Awards ceremony. Singer Natasha Bedingfield honored Summer, calling her "a remarkable woman who brought so much light and who inspired many women, including myself, through her music. And if we can remember her through her music, this will never really be the last dance." After her statement, she began to sing "Last Dance", Summer's Academy Award-winning song. As she sang the song, photos of Summer were displayed on a screen overhead.

Fans paid tribute to Summer by leaving flowers and memorabilia on her star on the Hollywood Walk of Fame. A few days after her death, her album sales increased by 3,277%, according to Nielsen SoundScan. Billboard magazine reported that the week before she died, Summer sold about 1,000 albums. After her death that number increased to 26,000.

== Legacy ==
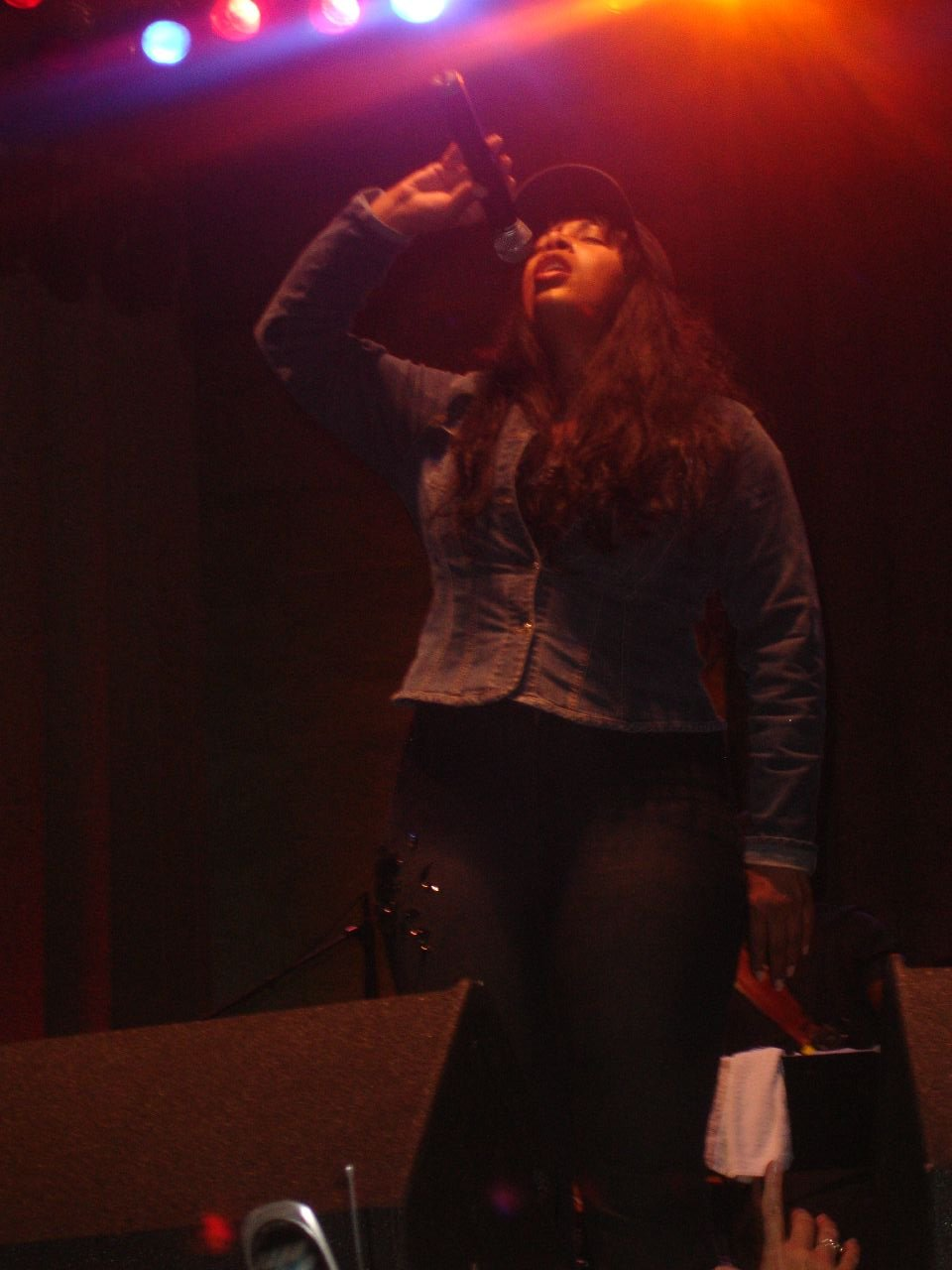
Summer during a rehearsal of a performance, 2005.

According to singer Marc Almond, Summer's collaboration with producer Giorgio Moroder "changed the face of music". As a recording artist, Summer either set or broke many chart records. During her late 1970s and early 1980s heyday, Summer scored eight consecutive top ten hits on the US Billboard Hot 100, the most by a female artist in the United States since Brenda Lee and the Supremes in the 1960s. Summer was the first female artist in chart history to score three number one singles in a calendar year on the Billboard Hot 100 in 1979. Summer at least landed a top 40 single on the Hot 100 in ten calendar years (1975-1984). In a seven-year period (1976–82), she scored more top ten hits than any act of that era with twelve. Between November 11, 1978 and January 5, 1980, Summer scored three consecutive number one albums on the Billboard 200 (Live and More, Bad Girls and On the Radio: Greatest Hits Volumes I & II). Summer is the only artist to have three number one double albums and also the first female artist to record back to back number one albums.

Between 1976 and 1979, Summer was the top disco act on the Billboard year-end lists four times in a row. She is the sixth most successful artist in the history of the Dance Club Songs chart, recording 16 number one singles alone on the chart. Summer is one of a selected group of artists to achieve a number one hit on the Billboard charts in five or more decades (1970s, 1980s, 1990s, 2000s, 2010s), joining Cher, Aretha Franklin, Diana Ross, Whitney Houston, Michael Jackson and Madonna.

She became a cultural icon and her prominence on the dance charts, for which she was referred to as the Queen of Disco, made her not just one of the defining voices of that era, but also an influence on pop artists from Madonna to Beyoncé. Unlike some other stars of disco who faded as the music became less popular in the early 1980s, Summer was able to grow beyond the genre and segued to a pop-rock sound. She had one of her biggest hits in the 1980s with "She Works Hard For the Money", which became another anthem, this time for women's rights, and later was included in the Songs of the Century list by the RIAA and NEA. Her 1975 hit "Love to Love You Baby" was included in the Rock and Roll Hall of Fame's 500 Songs that Shaped Rock and Roll list. Summer was the first black woman to be nominated for an MTV Video Music Award.

In May 2012, it was announced that "I Feel Love" was included in the list of preserved recordings at the Library of Congress's National Recording Registry. Her Rock and Roll Hall of Fame page listed Summer as "the Diva De Tutte Dive, the first true diva of the modern pop era".

In 2018, Summer: The Donna Summer Musical, a biographical musical featuring Summer's songs, began performances on Broadway at the Lunt-Fontanne Theatre, following a 2017 world premiere at the La Jolla Playhouse in San Diego.

In 2023, Rolling Stone ranked Summer at number 122 on its list of the 200 Greatest Singers of All Time.

In 2023, HBO released the documentary Love to Love You, Donna Summer, directed by her daughter Brooklyn Sudano and filmmaker Roger Ross Williams. In 2024, Summer was posthumously awarded the Grammy Lifetime Achievement Award. In 2025, she was posthumously inducted into the Songwriters Hall of Fame.

A street has been named after Donna Summer in Saint-Jean-d'Heurs, a rural commune of France.

In 2026, Alysa Liu captured Team USA's first Olympic women's singles title in 24 years at the 2026 Winter Olympics skating to MacArthur Park Suite. Liu had used the program during the 2024-25 figure skating season and elected to use it for the Games. Streams of the song skyrocketed 1292% over 24 hours after the performance, according to Spotify, nearly 50 years after its release.

== Discography ==
Studio albums

- Lady of the Night (1974)
- Love to Love You Baby (1975)
- A Love Trilogy (1976)
- Four Seasons of Love (1976)
- I Remember Yesterday (1977)
- Once Upon a Time (1977)
- Bad Girls (1979)
- The Wanderer (1980)
- Donna Summer (1982)
- She Works Hard for the Money (1983)
- Cats Without Claws (1984)
- All Systems Go (1987)
- Another Place and Time (1989)
- Mistaken Identity (1991)
- Christmas Spirit (1994)
- I'm a Rainbow (1996)
- Crayons (2008)

== Filmography ==
Notable film and television appearances
Year	Title	Role	Notes
1970	11 Uhr 20	Singer in a bar in Istanbul	Episodes: "Mord am Bosporus"
1978	Thank God It's Friday	Nicole Sims	
1994–97	Family Matters	Aunt Oona Urkel	Episodes: "Aunt Oona" & "Pound Foolish"
2011	Platinum Hit	Guest judge	Episode: "Dance Floor Royalty"

== Concert tours ==
- Once Upon a Time Tour (1977–1978)
- Bad Girls Tour (1979)
- The Wanderer Tour (1981)
- Hard for the Money Tour (1983)
- The Rainbow Tour (1984)
- Silver Girl Tour (1986)
- All Systems Go Tour (1987)
- Mistaken Identity Tour (1991–1992)
- Endless Summer Tour (1995)
- Mid Summer Nights Dream Tour (1996–1998)
- Live & More Encore Tour (1999)
- Greatest Hits Tour (2005–2007)
- Crayons Tour (2008)
