= Pete Bellotte =

British songwriter and producer (born 1943)

- Born: Peter John Bellotte; 28 August 1943 (age 83); Barnet, Hertfordshire, England
- Genres: Pop, disco
- Occupations: Songwriter, record producer
- Website: petebellotte.com

Peter John Bellotte (born 28 August 1943) is a British songwriter and record producer most noted for his work in the 1970s with Giorgio Moroder and Donna Summer.

== Life and career ==
Bellotte was born in Barnet, Hertfordshire, which is now part of North London. He learned guitar in his early teens, and joined a local group, Linda Laine and the Sinners, as a guitarist, becoming a professional in 1962. They toured all over the UK for two years and in the early 1960s toured in Germany. In Hamburg, they encountered another English band, Bluesology, and Bellotte became friends with their keyboard player, Reg Dwight, who later changed his name to Elton John. Linda Laine and the Sinners released several singles in the UK on EMI, all recorded at Abbey Road Studios in the early and mid-1960s, including "I Can't Stand It" (1963), the B-side of which, "If You Leave Me Now", was written by Bellotte.

Bellotte had become fluent in German, and wanted to become involved in record production. He moved to Munich and became an assistant to Italian musician Giorgio Moroder, who was also performing in Germany as a pop singer, Giorgio. In 1971, Bellotte wrote the lyrics for Moroder's song "Son of My Father", which became a number-1 hit in UK for Chicory Tip. Moroder and Bellotte began to work with American singer Donna Summer, who had married an Austrian actor and lived in Germany, and they wrote and produced several hits in Europe for her. Then they wrote and produced her international breakthrough hit, "Love to Love You Baby", in 1975.

Bellotte and Moroder produced Donna Summer's material through the 1970s and early 1980s, including the international hits "I Feel Love" (written by Bellotte, Moroder, and Summer, 1977); and "Hot Stuff" (written by Bellotte with Harold Faltermeyer and Keith Forsey, 1979). According to Steve Kurutz at AllMusic, "the heavily orchestrated, throbbing hit singles produced by Bellotte were the virtual blueprint for disco music". Several of Bellotte's songs with Summer have been recorded by other artists, or have been sampled. His song "Hot Stuff" is in Billboard's All-Time Top 100 Songs and was placed 32nd in Rolling Stone magazine's Best Summer Songs of All Time list.

As well as working with Donna Summer, Bellotte and Moroder wrote and produced Roberta Kelly's 1976 dance hit "Trouble-Maker", and Suzi Lane's 1979 hit "Harmony". He produced and wrote several tracks on Elton John's 1979 album Victim of Love. He also worked with Janet Jackson, Cliff Richard, Shalamar, Tina Turner, Mireille Mathieu, The Three Degrees, and Melba Moore. He produced Sugar Cane's cover of Bobby Bloom's "Montego", which became a disco hit for the group in 1978.

In 1991, Bellotte had a British Top 40 hit with a dance music version of Simon & Garfunkel's "Bridge over Troubled Water" as P.J.B. featuring Hannah and Her Sisters, the featured artists being a US group fronted by British singer Hannah Jones. The song would reach number 21 on the UK Singles Chart, with the group appearing on Top of the Pops as the opening act on the 26 September 1991 episode.

Bellotte won numerous worldwide music industry awards, including Producer of the Year in the US for 1978 and 1979. However, he felt increasingly marginalized by the "Disco sucks!" movement in the United States, and disliked having to spend time in Los Angeles. He moved back to Britain, and since 1993 has lived at Northchapel in West Sussex.

Bellotte is a leading collector of the writings and art of Mervyn Peake and has written on this subject in various periodicals. In late 2015, his book The Unround Circle was published by Nine Elms Books, consisting of some 22 fictional stories.

== Honours ==
In September 2004, Bellotte was honoured at the Dance Music Hall of Fame ceremony, held in New York; he was inducted there for many achievements and contributions as a producer and songwriter. In 2012, "I Feel Love" was one of only twenty-five historical recordings inducted into the US Library of Congress's National Recording Registry.
