= Donna Summer discography =

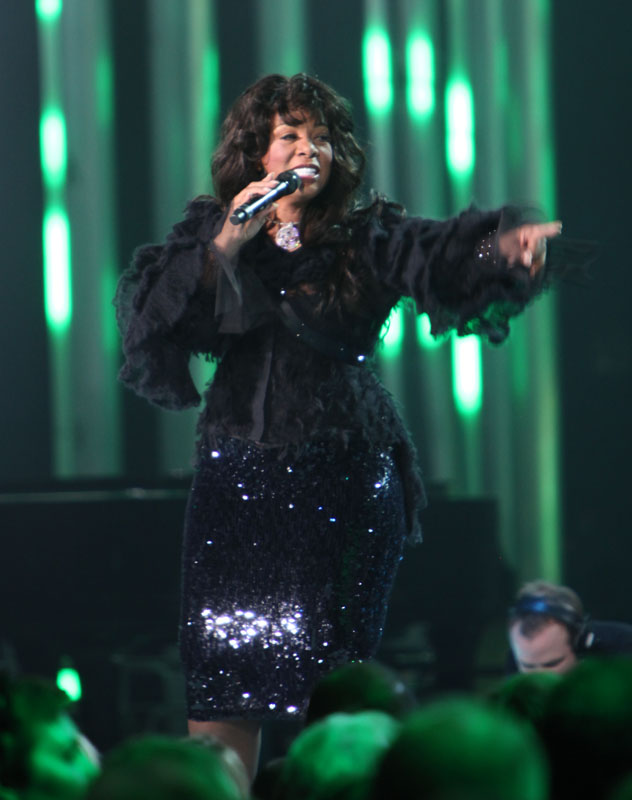
- Studio albums: 17
- Soundtrack albums: 9
- Live albums: 2
- Compilation albums: 34
- Singles: 89
- Music videos: 44

The discography of American singer Donna Summer includes 17 studio albums and 89 singles, plus several other releases. Her first single, "Wassermann", a German version of the song "Aquarius" from the musical Hair, was released in Europe in 1968 under her maiden name, Donna Gaines. She would become known as Donna Summer from 1974 onwards. Her first full-length album under that name was Lady of the Night.

Summer has sold more than 100 million records worldwide. Billboard list her as the 14th greatest female soloist of all time (51st overall). She has scored three number one albums on the US Billboard 200, sixteen number one hits on the US Dance Club Songs and four chart-topping singles in the Billboard Hot 100, earning her title as the reigning "Queen of Disco". Bad Girls remains the biggest selling album of her career with over 4 million copies sold worldwide. Summer holds the record for most consecutive double albums to hit number one on the Billboard charts (3) and first female to have four number-one singles in a 12-month period; three as a solo artist and one as a duet with Barbra Streisand.

== Label associations ==
Summer's debut album, Lady of the Night, was released only in the Netherlands by Groovy Records. This was followed by her first international release, Love to Love You Baby, issued by Giorgio Moroder's Oasis Records in association with Casablanca Records in the United States and Canada. (At this time Summer would again become based in the United States, having lived in Germany for several years previously.) "Love to Love You Baby" was her first single in the US; it was recorded on Oasis Records, which would join with Casablanca Records to release it in the US. Casablanca would assume responsibility for recording and distributing Summer's albums during the 1970s and in the process became one of the premier labels of that decade.

While Casablanca would become the main label responsible for managing Summer, Groovy continued to distribute her work in the Netherlands and other labels were used to distribute her work in other countries, such as GTO in the United Kingdom, Atlantic in Germany and France, Polar in Sweden and Durium in Italy. From 1977's Once Upon a Time... album, Casablanca would take over the distribution of Summer's albums in most countries (though her releases in the Netherlands would be issued by Philips and (until 1978 and 1979 respectively) would continue to be issued by Atlantic in Germany and France). As a result, some of her former labels released hits compilation albums in an attempt to cash in on losing her: GTO even scored a Top 5 placing in the United Kingdom with The Greatest Hits of Donna Summer. Summer remained with Casablanca, who helped make her one of the biggest stars in music and "The Queen of Disco" until the end of 1979, when she left due to personal and professional disputes with them and filed a lawsuit against them.

Summer subsequently became the first ever artist to be signed to David Geffen's Geffen Records and, after refusing to release her second album recorded for them (in 1981), they requested that she no longer work with long-term collaborator Giorgio Moroder, who had produced and co-written the vast majority of her hits in the previous decade. From the following album (issued in 1982), her Geffen work outside North America would be distributed by Warner Bros. Records, the umbrella company to Geffen.

By 1983, Casablanca had been bought out by PolyGram Records, who informed Summer that she still owed them an album as per her legal settlement with Casablanca. She delivered the album She Works Hard for the Money, which PolyGram chose to release on its Mercury Records imprint as opposed to Casablanca, Summer's former label. Following this, she released another album with Geffen a year later, but they reportedly refused to release much of her material in the remainder of the decade and, after they refused to release her album Another Place and Time in 1988, Summer left the label. However, Warner Bros. released the record in Europe the following year where it became a success, resulting in Summer being signed to their Atlantic label in North America. She remained signed to Atlantic and Warner Bros. until the early 1990s.

In 1990, Geffen Records was sold to MCA Records, which was owned by alcoholic beverage-maker Seagram; although Summer was no longer an artist on Geffen Records. In 1998, PolyGram and its imprints were purchased by Seagram, which merged the company with its MCA Records label and imprints to create the gigantic Universal Music Group. This had the result of Summer's MCA, Oasis, Casablanca, Geffen, and Mercury releases now being owned by one conglomerate, Universal Music. This catalogue of Summer's material stretches from 1971 to 1987 for Universal Music Group.

Summer again signed to PolyGram's Mercury label, who released two hits compilation albums, her 1994 Christmas album and the previously unreleased second Geffen album from 1981. Mercury also re-released some of Summer's Warner Bros. albums in the 1990s. By the end of the decade, she was signed to Sony's Epic Records, who released a live album. Her final album, in 2008, was released by Sony's Burgundy Records.

After 1987, Donna Summer owned the masters to her recordings released by Geffen/Warner Bros, Atlantic Records, Epic Records and Burgundy Records releases.

== Albums ==
- All albums were released internationally unless otherwise stated. The record labels given are those used to release the records in the US (unless of course they were not released in that country). As explained in the previous paragraph, other labels were sometimes used to distribute Summer's work in other countries (most notably for the Casablanca/Geffen/Atlantic albums). From Once Upon a Time through to the end of the Casablanca albums, this label was used to distribute Summer's work in most nations.

=== Studio albums ===
Year	Title	Peak chart positions								Certifications	Record label
Year	Title	US	US R&B	AUS	CAN	GER	NL	NZ	UK	Certifications	Record label
1974	Lady of the Night ^{[A]}	—	—	—	—	—	—	—	—		Groovy
1975	Love to Love You Baby	11	6	7	16	23	—	—	16	RIAA: Gold; BPI: Gold	Casablanca ^{[B]}^{[C]}^{[D]}
1976	A Love Trilogy	21	16	32	6	24	—	—	41	RIAA: Gold; BPI: Gold	Casablanca ^{[B]}^{[C]}^{[D]}
1976	Four Seasons of Love	29	13	—	16	31	—	—	—	RIAA: Gold; BPI: Silver	Casablanca ^{[B]}^{[C]}^{[D]}
1977	I Remember Yesterday	18	11	4	15	7	6	12	3	RIAA: Gold; BPI: Gold	Casablanca ^{[B]}^{[C]}^{[D]}
1977	Once Upon a Time...	26	13	44	27	—	—	—	24	RIAA: Gold; BPI: Gold; MC: Gold	Casablanca ^{[B]}^{[C]}^{[D]}
1979	Bad Girls	1	1	6	1	7	24	3	23	RIAA: 2× Platinum; BPI: Silver; MC: 2× Platinum; RMNZ: Gold	Casablanca ^{[B]}^{[C]}^{[D]}
1980	The Wanderer	13	12	18	—	54	—	16	55	RIAA: Gold	Geffen
1982	Donna Summer^{[G]}	20	6	45	32	37	4	—	13	RIAA: Gold; NVPI: Platinum	Geffen
1983	She Works Hard for the Money	9	5	21	23	14	9	47	28	RIAA: Gold; MC: Gold	Mercury
1984	Cats Without Claws	40	24	91	84	39	19	—	69		Geffen^{[G]}
1987	All Systems Go	122	53	—	—	—	72	—	—		Geffen^{[G]}
1989	Another Place and Time	53	71	93	60	49	29	—	17	BPI: Gold	Atlantic^{[G]}
1991	Mistaken Identity	—	97	—	—	—	—	—	—		Atlantic^{[G]}
1994	Christmas Spirit^{[H]}	—	—	—	—	—	—	—	—		Mercury
1996	I'm a Rainbow^{[E]}^{[F]}	—	—	—	—	—	—	—	—		Mercury
2008	Crayons	17	5	244	—	73	—	—	—		Burgundy
"—" denotes a recording that did not chart or was not released in that territory.

- ^{A} Released in the Netherlands only.
- ^{B} Love to Love You Baby and A Love Trilogy released by Oasis in North America in association with Casablanca.
- ^{C} Love to Love You Baby, A Love Trilogy, Four Seasons of Love and I Remember Yesterday released by various labels outside of North America including Groovy, who continued to distribute Summer's work in the Netherlands, GTO in the United Kingdom and Atlantic in Germany and France. Once Upon a Time... also released by Atlantic in Germany and France.
- ^{D} Once Upon a Time... and Bad Girls released by Philips in the Netherlands.
- ^{E} Recorded in 1981 but unreleased until 1996 and released in North America and Japan only.
- ^{F} Recorded in 1981 while Summer was signed to Geffen (who refused to release it). Eventually released by Mercury in 1996.
- ^{G} Released by Warner Bros. outside of North America.
- ^{H} Released only in North America.

=== Live albums ===
Year	Title	Peak chart positions								Certifications	Record label
Year	Title	US	US R&B	AUS	CAN	GER	NL	NZ	UK	Certifications	Record label
1978	Live and More	1	4	27	2	—	25	4	16	RIAA: Platinum; BPI: Gold; MC: 2× Platinum	Casablanca^{[I]}
1999	Live & More Encore	43	33	112	—	75	—	—	—		Epic
"—" denotes a recording that did not chart or was not released in that territory.

- ^{I} Released by Philips in the Netherlands and Atlantic in France.

=== Compilations ===
==== Main compilations ====
These compilation albums were issued by the record labels to which Summer was signed at the time of their releases. She had full involvement in the putting together of them and recorded new material for them.

Year	Title	Peak chart positions								Certifications (sales thresholds)	Record label
Year	Title	US	US R&B	AUS	CAN	GER	NL	NZ	UK	Certifications (sales thresholds)	Record label
1979	On the Radio: Greatest Hits Volumes I & II ^{[J]}	1	4	16	10	42	40	2	24	RIAA: 2× Platinum; BPI: Gold; MC: Platinum; RMNZ: Platinum	Casablanca ^{[J]}
1994	Endless Summer: Donna Summer's Greatest Hits	90	—	93	—	—	75	10	37	BPI: Gold	Mercury
2003	The Journey: The Very Best of Donna Summer	88	65	54	64	—	57	—	6	BPI: Gold	UTV
"—" denotes a recording that did not chart or was not released in that territory.

- ^{J} Released by Philips in The Netherlands; also available there with different artwork under the title Wereldsuccessen.

==== Other official compilations ====
These compilation albums were also issued by the record labels to which Summer was signed (or had recently left) at the time of their releases. However, some of them were only released in certain countries (particularly if a certain label was used to distribute Summer's work exclusively in that country/those countries) and none contained any new material from Summer (although The Donna Summer Anthology featured two tracks from the then unreleased 1981 I'm A Rainbow album).

Year	Title	Peak chart positions						Certifications (sales thresholds)	Record label
Year	Title	US	US R&B	AUS	GER	NL	UK	Certifications (sales thresholds)	Record label
1977	Greatest Hits ^{[K]}	—	—	—	—	30	—		Groovy/Atlantic
1977	The Greatest Hits of Donna Summer ^{[L]}	—	—	—	—	—	4	BPI: Gold	GTO
1978	Lo Mejor De Donna Summer Volume 1 ^{[M]}	—	—	—	—	—	—		Casablanca
1978	Lo Mejor De Donna Summer Volume 2 ^{[M]}	—	—	—	—	—	—		Casablanca
1980	Walk Away - Collector's Edition: The Best of 1977-1980	50	54	—	—	—	—		Casablanca
1985	The Summer Collection: Greatest Hits	—	—	—	—	—	—		Mercury
1987	The Dance Collection: A Compilation of Twelve Inch Singles	—	—	—	—	—	—		Casablanca
1990	The Best of Donna Summer ^{[N]}	—	—	124	76	44	24	BPI: Gold	Warner Bros.
1993	The Donna Summer Anthology	—	—	144	—	—	—		Mercury
1998	Greatest Hits	194	—	—	—	—	—		Mercury
2003	20th Century Masters – The Millennium Collection: The Best of Donna Summer	101	—	—	—	—	—		Mercury
2016	The Ultimate Collection ^{[O]}	—	—	—	—	—	30	BPI: Silver	Driven by the Music
"—" denotes a recording that did not chart or was not released in that territory.

- ^{K} Released only in The Netherlands and Germany with different artwork by Groovy and Atlantic respectively. These labels were responsible for distributing Summer's earlier work in those countries and released the compilations independently of any other label.
- ^{L} Released only in the United Kingdom (with a slightly different track listing to the Dutch/German Greatest Hits releases and similar [but not identical] artwork to the Dutch one) by GTO. This label was responsible for distributing Summer's earlier work in that country and released the compilation independently of any other label.
- ^{M} Released only in South America.
- ^{N} Released only outside of North America. It was issued by Warner Bros., who had been responsible for distributing much of Summer's material outside of North America since 1980. This work had been distributed in North America firstly by Geffen and later Atlantic, both of which were Warner Bros. companies. Atlantic (to whom Donna was still signed in North America at the time) did not release the compilation there.
- ^{O} Released in Europe and different from the 2003 compilation of the same name.

==== Miscellaneous compilations ====
- Star-Collection (1977, Midi, Germany)
- Star Gold (1979, Global, Germany)
- 12"ers (1990, WEA, Japan)
- The Complete Hits Collection (1991, Mercury, Japan)
- This Time I Know It's for Real (1993, WEA, Europe)
- The Complete Donna Summer (1994, Razor & Tie, USA)
- Donna Summer (1997, Mercury, Europe)
- Millennium Edition (2000, Mercury, Germany)
- The Ultimate Collection (2003, Universal, Netherlands)
- Gold (2005, Hip-O, International)
- Love to Love You, Baby A Tribute to Donna Summer (2005, Koch Records)
- Chronicles: 3 Classic Albums (2005, Mercury, USA)
- 20th Century Masters – The Millennium Collection: The Best of Donna Summer, Volume 2 (2006, Hip-O, USA)
- Icon (2013, Mercury, USA)
- Playlist: The Very Best of Donna Summer (2013, Legacy, USA)
- I Feel Love: The Collection (2013, Spectrum Music, Europe)
- Summer: The Original Hits (2018, Casablanca, International)

==== Remix albums ====
Year	Title	Peak	Record label
Year	Title	US	Record label
2013	Love to Love You Donna	97	Verve

=== Film soundtracks ===
Song(s) featured	Year	Album	Label	Note(s)
"Theme from The Deep (Down, Deep Inside)"	1977	Music from the Original Motion Picture Soundtrack "The Deep"	Casablanca	The soundtrack, composed by John Barry, features two versions of the same track, the "main" version of which became a hit single for Summer.
"Theme from The Deep (Down, Deep Inside) (A Love Song)"	1977	Music from the Original Motion Picture Soundtrack "The Deep"	Casablanca	The soundtrack, composed by John Barry, features two versions of the same track, the "main" version of which became a hit single for Summer.
"With Your Love"	1978	Thank God It's Friday: The Original Motion Picture Soundtrack	Casablanca	Summer, who also appeared in the film, is credited as the performer of three songs for the soundtrack (plus a reprise of "Last Dance") and also wrote and sang background vocals on the song "Take It to the Zoo", performed by Sunshine, a group composed of her sisters. When released as a single, "Last Dance" would become one of the biggest hits of Summer's career and one of her signature songs.
"Last Dance"	1978	Thank God It's Friday: The Original Motion Picture Soundtrack	Casablanca	Summer, who also appeared in the film, is credited as the performer of three songs for the soundtrack (plus a reprise of "Last Dance") and also wrote and sang background vocals on the song "Take It to the Zoo", performed by Sunshine, a group composed of her sisters. When released as a single, "Last Dance" would become one of the biggest hits of Summer's career and one of her signature songs.
"Take It to the Zoo"	1978	Thank God It's Friday: The Original Motion Picture Soundtrack	Casablanca	Summer, who also appeared in the film, is credited as the performer of three songs for the soundtrack (plus a reprise of "Last Dance") and also wrote and sang background vocals on the song "Take It to the Zoo", performed by Sunshine, a group composed of her sisters. When released as a single, "Last Dance" would become one of the biggest hits of Summer's career and one of her signature songs.
"Last Dance (Reprise)"	1978	Thank God It's Friday: The Original Motion Picture Soundtrack	Casablanca	Summer, who also appeared in the film, is credited as the performer of three songs for the soundtrack (plus a reprise of "Last Dance") and also wrote and sang background vocals on the song "Take It to the Zoo", performed by Sunshine, a group composed of her sisters. When released as a single, "Last Dance" would become one of the biggest hits of Summer's career and one of her signature songs.
"Je T'aime... Moi Non Plus"	1978	Thank God It's Friday: The Original Motion Picture Soundtrack	Casablanca	Summer, who also appeared in the film, is credited as the performer of three songs for the soundtrack (plus a reprise of "Last Dance") and also wrote and sang background vocals on the song "Take It to the Zoo", performed by Sunshine, a group composed of her sisters. When released as a single, "Last Dance" would become one of the biggest hits of Summer's career and one of her signature songs.
"On the Radio"	1980	Foxes: Music from the Motion Picture	Casablanca	Soundtrack album by various artists with music written and produced by Giorgio Moroder (although different lyricists were used, Summer herself being credited with the lyrics on this track). The song previously appears on Summer's 1979 compilation album On the Radio: Greatest Hits Volumes 1 & 2 in both its full length and edited versions (with the track being credited as "written and recorded for the motion picture 'Foxes'"). The edited version was released as a 7" single in late 1979 and a 12" single with a longer instrumental part and the omission of the final verse (replacing it with a repeat of the second verse) was also available. It is in fact the 12" version featured on this soundtrack, which also features an instrumental of "On the Radio" credited to Moroder alone. "On the Radio" became a Top 5 hit for Summer.
"Highway Runner"	1982	Fast Times at Ridgemont High: Music from the Motion Picture	Full Moon ^{[P]}	Track from Summer's shelved 1981 album I'm a Rainbow that made its first appearance on this soundtrack album the following year.
"Romeo"	1983	Flashdance: Original Soundtrack from the Motion Picture	Casablanca	Track from Summer's shelved 1981 album I'm a Rainbow that made its first appearance on this award-winning soundtrack album two years later.
"Ordinary Miracle"	1996	Let It Be Me	Rysher Entertainment	While no soundtrack album was released for the film Let It Be Me, this song (produced by Narada Michael Walden) can be heard playing over the end credits.
"Whenever There Is Love"	1996	Daylight: Music from the Motion Picture	Universal	Soundtrack to a Sylvester Stallone film. The song, a duet with longtime collaborator Bruce Roberts was released as a single and also in a dance remix. A French version entitled "Tant Qu'il Y Aura L'Amour" was also issued and a Spanish version features on the Spanish DVD of the film.
"Dreamcatcher"	2000	Naturally Native (Original Soundtrack Recording)	Silver Wave	Film soundtrack featuring one song by Summer.
"The Power of One"	2000	Pokémon 2: The Power of One - Music from and Inspired by the Motion Picture	Atlantic	Film soundtrack featuring one song by Summer, also released as a single.

- ^{P} Released by Full Moon and distributed by Asylum in North America and Warner Music Group in other countries.

=== Cast recordings ===
Song(s) featured	Year	Album	Note(s)
"Wassermann"	1968	Haare (Deutsche Originalaufnahme)	The original German cast recording of the musical "Hair." Donna Gaines is credited as a joint lead vocalist on some songs ("Wassermann"/"Luft"/"White Boys"/"Schweben Im Raum"/"Finale") and sings as part of the ensemble on the others listed. "Wassermann" was also released as a single in Germany, making it her first single release.
"Donna"	1968	Haare (Deutsche Originalaufnahme)	The original German cast recording of the musical "Hair." Donna Gaines is credited as a joint lead vocalist on some songs ("Wassermann"/"Luft"/"White Boys"/"Schweben Im Raum"/"Finale") and sings as part of the ensemble on the others listed. "Wassermann" was also released as a single in Germany, making it her first single release.
"Manchester"	1968	Haare (Deutsche Originalaufnahme)	The original German cast recording of the musical "Hair." Donna Gaines is credited as a joint lead vocalist on some songs ("Wassermann"/"Luft"/"White Boys"/"Schweben Im Raum"/"Finale") and sings as part of the ensemble on the others listed. "Wassermann" was also released as a single in Germany, making it her first single release.
"Ich Bin Ein Farbiger"	1968	Haare (Deutsche Originalaufnahme)	The original German cast recording of the musical "Hair." Donna Gaines is credited as a joint lead vocalist on some songs ("Wassermann"/"Luft"/"White Boys"/"Schweben Im Raum"/"Finale") and sings as part of the ensemble on the others listed. "Wassermann" was also released as a single in Germany, making it her first single release.
"Ich Hab Kein..."	1968	Haare (Deutsche Originalaufnahme)	The original German cast recording of the musical "Hair." Donna Gaines is credited as a joint lead vocalist on some songs ("Wassermann"/"Luft"/"White Boys"/"Schweben Im Raum"/"Finale") and sings as part of the ensemble on the others listed. "Wassermann" was also released as a single in Germany, making it her first single release.
"Luft"	1968	Haare (Deutsche Originalaufnahme)	The original German cast recording of the musical "Hair." Donna Gaines is credited as a joint lead vocalist on some songs ("Wassermann"/"Luft"/"White Boys"/"Schweben Im Raum"/"Finale") and sings as part of the ensemble on the others listed. "Wassermann" was also released as a single in Germany, making it her first single release.
"Ich Bin Reich"	1968	Haare (Deutsche Originalaufnahme)	The original German cast recording of the musical "Hair." Donna Gaines is credited as a joint lead vocalist on some songs ("Wassermann"/"Luft"/"White Boys"/"Schweben Im Raum"/"Finale") and sings as part of the ensemble on the others listed. "Wassermann" was also released as a single in Germany, making it her first single release.
"Bergab"	1968	Haare (Deutsche Originalaufnahme)	The original German cast recording of the musical "Hair." Donna Gaines is credited as a joint lead vocalist on some songs ("Wassermann"/"Luft"/"White Boys"/"Schweben Im Raum"/"Finale") and sings as part of the ensemble on the others listed. "Wassermann" was also released as a single in Germany, making it her first single release.
"Haar"	1968	Haare (Deutsche Originalaufnahme)	The original German cast recording of the musical "Hair." Donna Gaines is credited as a joint lead vocalist on some songs ("Wassermann"/"Luft"/"White Boys"/"Schweben Im Raum"/"Finale") and sings as part of the ensemble on the others listed. "Wassermann" was also released as a single in Germany, making it her first single release.
"Hare Krishna"	1968	Haare (Deutsche Originalaufnahme)	The original German cast recording of the musical "Hair." Donna Gaines is credited as a joint lead vocalist on some songs ("Wassermann"/"Luft"/"White Boys"/"Schweben Im Raum"/"Finale") and sings as part of the ensemble on the others listed. "Wassermann" was also released as a single in Germany, making it her first single release.
"Wo Geh' Ich Hin"	1968	Haare (Deutsche Originalaufnahme)	The original German cast recording of the musical "Hair." Donna Gaines is credited as a joint lead vocalist on some songs ("Wassermann"/"Luft"/"White Boys"/"Schweben Im Raum"/"Finale") and sings as part of the ensemble on the others listed. "Wassermann" was also released as a single in Germany, making it her first single release.
"White Boys"	1968	Haare (Deutsche Originalaufnahme)	The original German cast recording of the musical "Hair." Donna Gaines is credited as a joint lead vocalist on some songs ("Wassermann"/"Luft"/"White Boys"/"Schweben Im Raum"/"Finale") and sings as part of the ensemble on the others listed. "Wassermann" was also released as a single in Germany, making it her first single release.
"Schweben Im Raum"	1968	Haare (Deutsche Originalaufnahme)	The original German cast recording of the musical "Hair." Donna Gaines is credited as a joint lead vocalist on some songs ("Wassermann"/"Luft"/"White Boys"/"Schweben Im Raum"/"Finale") and sings as part of the ensemble on the others listed. "Wassermann" was also released as a single in Germany, making it her first single release.
"3500"	1968	Haare (Deutsche Originalaufnahme)	The original German cast recording of the musical "Hair." Donna Gaines is credited as a joint lead vocalist on some songs ("Wassermann"/"Luft"/"White Boys"/"Schweben Im Raum"/"Finale") and sings as part of the ensemble on the others listed. "Wassermann" was also released as a single in Germany, making it her first single release.
"Die Letzten Sterne"	1968	Haare (Deutsche Originalaufnahme)	The original German cast recording of the musical "Hair." Donna Gaines is credited as a joint lead vocalist on some songs ("Wassermann"/"Luft"/"White Boys"/"Schweben Im Raum"/"Finale") and sings as part of the ensemble on the others listed. "Wassermann" was also released as a single in Germany, making it her first single release.
"Finale"	1968	Haare (Deutsche Originalaufnahme)	The original German cast recording of the musical "Hair." Donna Gaines is credited as a joint lead vocalist on some songs ("Wassermann"/"Luft"/"White Boys"/"Schweben Im Raum"/"Finale") and sings as part of the ensemble on the others listed. "Wassermann" was also released as a single in Germany, making it her first single release.
"Light Sings"	1971	The Me Nobody Knows (Original German cast recording)	The English-language version of "The Me Nobody Knows" sung by the German cast. For reasons unknown, Summer is credited as "Gayn Pierre." Her main song as a lead vocalist is "How I Feel," but she can also be heard on other tracks.
"This World"	1971	The Me Nobody Knows (Original German cast recording)	The English-language version of "The Me Nobody Knows" sung by the German cast. For reasons unknown, Summer is credited as "Gayn Pierre." Her main song as a lead vocalist is "How I Feel," but she can also be heard on other tracks.
"How I Feel"	1971	The Me Nobody Knows (Original German cast recording)	The English-language version of "The Me Nobody Knows" sung by the German cast. For reasons unknown, Summer is credited as "Gayn Pierre." Her main song as a lead vocalist is "How I Feel," but she can also be heard on other tracks.
"If I Had a Million Dollars"	1971	The Me Nobody Knows (Original German cast recording)	The English-language version of "The Me Nobody Knows" sung by the German cast. For reasons unknown, Summer is credited as "Gayn Pierre." Her main song as a lead vocalist is "How I Feel," but she can also be heard on other tracks.
"Sounds (Reprise)"	1971	The Me Nobody Knows (Original German cast recording)	The English-language version of "The Me Nobody Knows" sung by the German cast. For reasons unknown, Summer is credited as "Gayn Pierre." Her main song as a lead vocalist is "How I Feel," but she can also be heard on other tracks.
"Fugue"	1971	The Me Nobody Knows (Original German cast recording)	The English-language version of "The Me Nobody Knows" sung by the German cast. For reasons unknown, Summer is credited as "Gayn Pierre." Her main song as a lead vocalist is "How I Feel," but she can also be heard on other tracks.
"Sounds"	1971	The Me Nobody Knows (Original German cast recording)	The English-language version of "The Me Nobody Knows" sung by the German cast. For reasons unknown, Summer is credited as "Gayn Pierre." Her main song as a lead vocalist is "How I Feel," but she can also be heard on other tracks.
"Black"	1971	The Me Nobody Knows (Original German cast recording)	The English-language version of "The Me Nobody Knows" sung by the German cast. For reasons unknown, Summer is credited as "Gayn Pierre." Her main song as a lead vocalist is "How I Feel," but she can also be heard on other tracks.
"Let Me Come In"	1971	The Me Nobody Knows (Original German cast recording)	The English-language version of "The Me Nobody Knows" sung by the German cast. For reasons unknown, Summer is credited as "Gayn Pierre." Her main song as a lead vocalist is "How I Feel," but she can also be heard on other tracks.
"Licht singt"	1971	Ich Bin Ich (Original German cast recording)	The German-language version of "The Me Nobody Knows" sung by the German cast. The German version of "How I Feel" however is sung by a different person, although "Gayn Pierre" is still credited on several tracks.
"Die Welt"	1971	Ich Bin Ich (Original German cast recording)	The German-language version of "The Me Nobody Knows" sung by the German cast. The German version of "How I Feel" however is sung by a different person, although "Gayn Pierre" is still credited on several tracks.
"Hätt ich eine Million Dollars"	1971	Ich Bin Ich (Original German cast recording)	The German-language version of "The Me Nobody Knows" sung by the German cast. The German version of "How I Feel" however is sung by a different person, although "Gayn Pierre" is still credited on several tracks.
"Schall"	1971	Ich Bin Ich (Original German cast recording)	The German-language version of "The Me Nobody Knows" sung by the German cast. The German version of "How I Feel" however is sung by a different person, although "Gayn Pierre" is still credited on several tracks.
"Fuge"	1971	Ich Bin Ich (Original German cast recording)	The German-language version of "The Me Nobody Knows" sung by the German cast. The German version of "How I Feel" however is sung by a different person, although "Gayn Pierre" is still credited on several tracks.
"Schwarz"	1971	Ich Bin Ich (Original German cast recording)	The German-language version of "The Me Nobody Knows" sung by the German cast. The German version of "How I Feel" however is sung by a different person, although "Gayn Pierre" is still credited on several tracks.
"Schall (Reprise)"	1971	Ich Bin Ich (Original German cast recording)	The German-language version of "The Me Nobody Knows" sung by the German cast. The German version of "How I Feel" however is sung by a different person, although "Gayn Pierre" is still credited on several tracks.
"Laß mich herein"	1971	Ich Bin Ich (Original German cast recording)	The German-language version of "The Me Nobody Knows" sung by the German cast. The German version of "How I Feel" however is sung by a different person, although "Gayn Pierre" is still credited on several tracks.
"Bereitet den Weg"	1971	Godspell (Original German cast recording)	The original German cast recording of the musical "Godspell." The original LP credits "Gayn Pierre" and the CD credits "Donna Summer." Although she is only credited on two tracks ("Oh, segne Gott mein' Seel" and "Du bist das Licht der Welt"), she can be heard in the background on many of the other tracks.
"Gott, hilf den Menschen"	1971	Godspell (Original German cast recording)	The original German cast recording of the musical "Godspell." The original LP credits "Gayn Pierre" and the CD credits "Donna Summer." Although she is only credited on two tracks ("Oh, segne Gott mein' Seel" and "Du bist das Licht der Welt"), she can be heard in the background on many of the other tracks.
"Tag für Tag "	1971	Godspell (Original German cast recording)	The original German cast recording of the musical "Godspell." The original LP credits "Gayn Pierre" and the CD credits "Donna Summer." Although she is only credited on two tracks ("Oh, segne Gott mein' Seel" and "Du bist das Licht der Welt"), she can be heard in the background on many of the other tracks.
"Lernt eure Lektion"	1971	Godspell (Original German cast recording)	The original German cast recording of the musical "Godspell." The original LP credits "Gayn Pierre" and the CD credits "Donna Summer." Although she is only credited on two tracks ("Oh, segne Gott mein' Seel" and "Du bist das Licht der Welt"), she can be heard in the background on many of the other tracks.
"Oh, segne Gott mein' Seel"	1971	Godspell (Original German cast recording)	The original German cast recording of the musical "Godspell." The original LP credits "Gayn Pierre" and the CD credits "Donna Summer." Although she is only credited on two tracks ("Oh, segne Gott mein' Seel" and "Du bist das Licht der Welt"), she can be heard in the background on many of the other tracks.
"Dann hat sich's gelohnt"	1971	Godspell (Original German cast recording)	The original German cast recording of the musical "Godspell." The original LP credits "Gayn Pierre" and the CD credits "Donna Summer." Although she is only credited on two tracks ("Oh, segne Gott mein' Seel" and "Du bist das Licht der Welt"), she can be heard in the background on many of the other tracks.
"Gut und schön"	1971	Godspell (Original German cast recording)	The original German cast recording of the musical "Godspell." The original LP credits "Gayn Pierre" and the CD credits "Donna Summer." Although she is only credited on two tracks ("Oh, segne Gott mein' Seel" and "Du bist das Licht der Welt"), she can be heard in the background on many of the other tracks.
"Di bist das Licht der Welt"	1971	Godspell (Original German cast recording)	The original German cast recording of the musical "Godspell." The original LP credits "Gayn Pierre" and the CD credits "Donna Summer." Although she is only credited on two tracks ("Oh, segne Gott mein' Seel" and "Du bist das Licht der Welt"), she can be heard in the background on many of the other tracks.
"Kehr um, oh Mensch"	1971	Godspell (Original German cast recording)	The original German cast recording of the musical "Godspell." The original LP credits "Gayn Pierre" and the CD credits "Donna Summer." Although she is only credited on two tracks ("Oh, segne Gott mein' Seel" and "Du bist das Licht der Welt"), she can be heard in the background on many of the other tracks.
"Geschieht euch recht, was kommt"	1971	Godspell (Original German cast recording)	The original German cast recording of the musical "Godspell." The original LP credits "Gayn Pierre" and the CD credits "Donna Summer." Although she is only credited on two tracks ("Oh, segne Gott mein' Seel" and "Du bist das Licht der Welt"), she can be heard in the background on many of the other tracks.
"Warum mußt du gehen?"	1971	Godspell (Original German cast recording)	The original German cast recording of the musical "Godspell." The original LP credits "Gayn Pierre" and the CD credits "Donna Summer." Although she is only credited on two tracks ("Oh, segne Gott mein' Seel" and "Du bist das Licht der Welt"), she can be heard in the background on many of the other tracks.
"Wir beschwör'n dich"	1971	Godspell (Original German cast recording)	The original German cast recording of the musical "Godspell." The original LP credits "Gayn Pierre" and the CD credits "Donna Summer." Although she is only credited on two tracks ("Oh, segne Gott mein' Seel" and "Du bist das Licht der Welt"), she can be heard in the background on many of the other tracks.
"Auf den Weiden"	1971	Godspell (Original German cast recording)	The original German cast recording of the musical "Godspell." The original LP credits "Gayn Pierre" and the CD credits "Donna Summer." Although she is only credited on two tracks ("Oh, segne Gott mein' Seel" and "Du bist das Licht der Welt"), she can be heard in the background on many of the other tracks.
"Finale"	1971	Godspell (Original German cast recording)	The original German cast recording of the musical "Godspell." The original LP credits "Gayn Pierre" and the CD credits "Donna Summer." Although she is only credited on two tracks ("Oh, segne Gott mein' Seel" and "Du bist das Licht der Welt"), she can be heard in the background on many of the other tracks.
"Lang' leb' Gott"	1971	Godspell (Original German cast recording)	The original German cast recording of the musical "Godspell." The original LP credits "Gayn Pierre" and the CD credits "Donna Summer." Although she is only credited on two tracks ("Oh, segne Gott mein' Seel" and "Du bist das Licht der Welt"), she can be heard in the background on many of the other tracks.
"Tag für Tag"	1971	Godspell (Original German cast recording)	The original German cast recording of the musical "Godspell." The original LP credits "Gayn Pierre" and the CD credits "Donna Summer." Although she is only credited on two tracks ("Oh, segne Gott mein' Seel" and "Du bist das Licht der Welt"), she can be heard in the background on many of the other tracks.
"Elizabeth Recitative"	2000	Child of the Promise (A Musical Story Celebrating the Birth of Christ)	A concept album written by Christian writers Michael and Stormie Omartian telling the story of the Nativity of Jesus through music, on which Summer sings the part of Elizabeth.
"When the Dream Never Dies"	2000	Child of the Promise (A Musical Story Celebrating the Birth of Christ)	A concept album written by Christian writers Michael and Stormie Omartian telling the story of the Nativity of Jesus through music, on which Summer sings the part of Elizabeth.
"Mary and Elizabeth Recitative"	2000	Child of the Promise (A Musical Story Celebrating the Birth of Christ)	A concept album written by Christian writers Michael and Stormie Omartian telling the story of the Nativity of Jesus through music, on which Summer sings the part of Elizabeth.
"I Cannot Be Silent"	2000	Child of the Promise (A Musical Story Celebrating the Birth of Christ)	A concept album written by Christian writers Michael and Stormie Omartian telling the story of the Nativity of Jesus through music, on which Summer sings the part of Elizabeth.

=== Guest appearances ===
Title	Year	Album	Artist(s)	Note(s)
"The Family"	1976	Trouble Maker (entitled The Trouble Maker in Europe)	Roberta Kelly	Album largely written and produced by Giorgio Moroder and Pete Bellotte. Summer's background vocals feature on one track.
"Happiness in the World"	1976	Winterference	Tom Winter	Summer features as a backing vocalist on one track.
"Shut Out/Heaven Is a Disco"	1977	Shut Out	Paul Jabara	Summer features as a guest vocalist on one track. "Shut Out" was also released as a single.
"Old Fashioned Girl"	1977	Brooklyn Dreams	Brooklyn Dreams	Summer features as a backing vocalist on one track. She would continue to work with the Brooklyn Dreams for several years. They sang backing vocals on several of her songs (lead singer Joe "Bean" Esposito also shared lead vocals with her on some, most notably the top five hit "Heaven Knows") and wrote numerous songs with her (including the number one hit "Bad Girls"). Summer would later marry group member Bruce Sudano and continue to write with him for many years.
"Burning Up With Fever"	1978	Gene Simmons	Gene Simmons	Summer sings background vocals on two tracks.
"Tunnel of Love"	1978	Gene Simmons	Gene Simmons	Summer sings background vocals on two tracks.
"Mimi's Song"	1979	The Music for UNICEF: A Gift of Song	Various Artists	Features Summer's spoken introduction to her performance at the UNICEF benefit concert. While she performed the song live at the concert, the version used on the album is in fact from the Live and More album the previous year, which was recorded live at the Universal Amphitheater.
"Heaven Knows"	1979	Sleepless Nights	Brooklyn Dreams	"Heaven Knows" originally featured on Summer's Live and More album the previous year, with Brooklyn Dreams member Joe Esposito sharing the lead vocals (performing the "echo" parts on the verses), and became a Top 5 hit single. This version on the Brooklyn Dreams's album is a re-recorded version with Summer and Esposito's vocal parts being swapped around.
"Foggy Day"/"Never Lose Your Sense of Humor"	1979	The Third Album	Paul Jabara	Medley of two songs, "Never Lose Your Sense of Humor" being a duet with Summer. The track was also released as a single.
"Too Much for the Lady"	1979	Joy Ride	Brooklyn Dreams	Features spoken vocals by Summer.
"No More Tears (Enough Is Enough)"	1979	Wet	Barbra Streisand	The original, full length version of the later Number 1 hit single. A longer version, remixed by Harold Faltermeyer, appears on Summer's compilation album On the Radio: Greatest Hits Volumes 1 & 2. Edits of both album versions appear on 7" singles issued by Columbia Records (edit of Wet version) and Casablanca Records (edit of On the Radio version), Streisand and Summer's respective record labels. The extended On the Radio version was issued as a 12" single by both labels, making Wet the only release to contain the original version.
"A Lover in the Night"	1980	Won't Let Go	Brooklyn Dreams	Summer sings background vocals on two tracks.
"I Won't Let Go"	1980	Won't Let Go	Brooklyn Dreams	Summer sings background vocals on two tracks.
"Pretenders"	1981	Fugitive Kind	Bruce Sudano	Summer provides background vocals for five tracks on husband and former Brooklyn Dreams member Bruce Sudano's album and is credited as Donna Sudano.
"A Girl Like You"	1981	Fugitive Kind	Bruce Sudano	Summer provides background vocals for five tracks on husband and former Brooklyn Dreams member Bruce Sudano's album and is credited as Donna Sudano.
"True Love"	1981	Fugitive Kind	Bruce Sudano	Summer provides background vocals for five tracks on husband and former Brooklyn Dreams member Bruce Sudano's album and is credited as Donna Sudano.
"Modern Age"	1981	Fugitive Kind	Bruce Sudano	Summer provides background vocals for five tracks on husband and former Brooklyn Dreams member Bruce Sudano's album and is credited as Donna Sudano.
"Talk to Me"	1981	Fugitive Kind	Bruce Sudano	Summer provides background vocals for five tracks on husband and former Brooklyn Dreams member Bruce Sudano's album and is credited as Donna Sudano.
"Walk Hand in Hand"	1982	Disco Round 2	Various Artists	Previously unreleased track that features on this compilation album released in Germany.
"Incommunicado"	1983	Different Style!	Musical Youth	Summer provides guest vocals on the British group's song that was co-written by Bruce Sudano, after they provided guest singles on her hit single "Unconditional Love" in the same year.
"This Girl's Back in Town"	1986	De La Noche: The True Story – A Poperetta	Paul Jabara	Summer's final appearance on an original Paul Jabara album.
"Something's Missing"	1989	Greatest Hits... and Misses	Paul Jabara	A track originally released as a Jabara solo track on his Keeping Time album in 1978. The duet version with Summer remained unreleased until this compilation album eleven years later.
"Carry On"	1992	Forever Dancing	Giorgio Moroder	The first collaboration between Summer and Moroder for 11 years. The song was released as a single in Germany and, some years later, in a remixed form in other countries, winning the Grammy award for Best Dance Recording in 1998.
"La Vie En Rose"	1993	Tribute to Edith Piaf	Various Artist	An album of various artists covering songs made famous by Edith Piaf. Summer's version of "La Vie En Rose" was released as a single in France and a promotional single in the United States.
"She Works Hard for the Money"	1994	Grammys Greatest Moments Volume 1	Various Artists	Live performance of Summer's hit from the 26th Annual Grammy Awards in 1984.
"Does He Love You"	1996	Gently	Liza Minnelli	A duet cover of the 1993 song originally by Reba McEntire and Linda Davis.
"From a Distance"	1996	One Voice	Various Artists	An album produced by Summer's long-term collaborator Michael Omartian featuring a cover of the popular song with lead vocals by Summer, Nanci Griffith and Raul Malo.
"Someday"	1996	Mouse House: Disney's Dance Mixes	Various Artists	Compilation of dance versions of various songs from Disney films. "Someday" was originally featured in The Hunchback of Notre Dame in 1996 and performed by Heidi Mollenhauer.
"Black Power"	1998	Moonflowers & Mini-Skirts	Peter Thomas	Compilation of tracks recorded in the late 1960s and early 1970s. Summer's song is taken from a German television show called 11 Uhr 20, in which she had a cameo as a nightclub diva.
"My Prayer for You"	1999	Sing Me to Sleep, Mommy	Various Artists	Compilation of original ballads and lullabies featuring one song by Summer.
"When I Look Up"	2000	Vertical	Darwin Hobbs	Duet with the American gospel singer.
"Rosie Christmas"	2000	Another Rosie Christmas	Rosie O'Donnell/Various Artists	Christmas album by American comedian Rosie O'Donnell featuring one track by Summer, produced by Ric Wake.
"Take Heart"	2000	The Mercy Project	Various Artists	Gospel album released on the Christian Word label. Features one song by Summer.
"Someone to Watch Over Me" (Video Version)	2001	Keeping the Dream Alive: Race to Erase MS	Various Artists	Charity album to raise money for/awareness of multiple sclerosis. This live recording of the Gershwin standard is actually from Summer's 1999 VH-1 special Live & More Encore but was not included on the accompanying album. The other songs performed on the special/video but not released on the album would remain unreleased on CD until 2013 on a compilation entitled Playlist: The Very Best of Donna Summer.
"No More Tears (Enough Is Enough)"	2004	DiscoMania	Various Artists	U.K. album featuring a compilation of pre-recorded performances from a TV special of the same name, on which contemporary pop acts (mostly British ones) performed disco classics from the 1970s. Summer hosted the show and performed her hit "Enough Is Enough" as a duet with Irish boyband Westlife. The CD also included "The Donna Summer 'Eternity' Megamix."
"Power of Love"	2005	So Amazing: An All-Star Tribute to Luther Vandross	Various Artists	Tribute to the late Luther Vandross by various artists covering his songs. Summer's version of "Power Of Love" was also released as a maxi-single.
"Are You Brave?"	2005	Songs from the Neighborhood - The Music of Mister Rogers	Various Artists	Tribute album to the late children's television host Fred Rogers by various artists performing songs used in his popular programme Mister Rogers' Neighborhood. Summer performs "Are You Brave?" and is featured in the ensemble of "Thank You For Being You".
"Thank You For Being You"	2005	Songs from the Neighborhood - The Music of Mister Rogers	Various Artists	Tribute album to the late children's television host Fred Rogers by various artists performing songs used in his popular programme Mister Rogers' Neighborhood. Summer performs "Are You Brave?" and is featured in the ensemble of "Thank You For Being You".
"MacArthur Park"	2005	Night of the Proms	Various Artists	Soundtrack of the Belgian concert on which Summer performs two of her hits live. "State of Independence" also features vocals by Jenny Berggren of Ace of Base.
"State of Independence"	2005	Night of the Proms	Various Artists	Soundtrack of the Belgian concert on which Summer performs two of her hits live. "State of Independence" also features vocals by Jenny Berggren of Ace of Base.
"A Whole New World"	2007	At the Movies	Dave Koz	Summer provides guest vocals for saxophone player Dave Koz on a cover of the song from Disney's Aladdin.
"Un-Break My Heart/Crazy/On The Radio"	2011	Hit Man Returns	David Foster	Soundtrack to the TV special.

== Singles ==
=== Commercially released singles ===
==== 1968–1975 (Pre-Casablanca signing) ====
Summer's first single, "Wassermann" was taken from the German cast recording of the musical Hair and released by Polydor Records. The next few singles were one-offs that were not major hits, released on different labels, until she was signed to the Dutch label Groovy Records in 1974 ("The Hostage" being her first single for them). Atlantic Records became responsible for distributing Summer's work in Germany at the same time and both labels would continue to distribute Summer's work in the respective countries for the following few years (including the first few years of her signing to Casablanca Records in North America).

Year	Title	Peaks		Album
Year	Title	GER	NL	Album
1968	"Wassermann" ^{[A]} b/w "Finale" (Donna Gaines und Ensemble)	—	—	Haare (Hair)
1969	"If You Walkin' Alone" ^{[A]} b/w "Can't Understand" (Donna Gains)	—	—	—N/a
1971	"Sally Go 'Round the Roses" b/w "So Said the Man" (Donna Gaines)	—	—	—N/a
1974	"Denver Dream" ^{[B]} b/w "Something's in the Wind"	—	—	—N/a
1974	"The Hostage" b/w "Let's Work Together Now"	—	2	Lady of the Night
1974	"Lady of the Night" b/w "Wounded"	40	4	Lady of the Night
1975	"Love to Love You" ^{[C]} b/w "Need-A-Man Blues"	—	13	—N/a
1975	"Virgin Mary" ^{[C]} b/w "Pandora's Box"	—	—	—N/a
"—" denotes a recording that did not chart or was not released in that territory.

- ^{A} Released in Germany only.
- ^{B} Released in the Netherlands, Belgium and France only.
- ^{C} Released in the Netherlands only.

None of the above singles were released outside of just a few countries in Europe. "Sally Go 'Round the Roses" and "The Hostage" were released in the United Kingdom, but were not UK hits. Summer scored hits in the Netherlands with "Let's Work Together Now", "Lady of the Night", and "Love to Love You" (later named "Love to Love You Baby").

==== 1975–1980 (Casablanca Records era) ====
These singles were all released commercially in at least one format in one country. Promotional formats may have also been released in that country/those countries or in others.

Summer's recordings during this era were distributed by Casablanca Records in North America and, from late 1977 onwards, in most other nations. Various other labels released Summer's work internationally prior to said time (and in a small number of cases, during it). Summer left the label in 1979 but they continued to issue previously released material for a while afterwards.

Singles from the film soundtracks of The Deep and Thank God It's Friday were distributed internationally by Casablanca, as that label was responsible for releasing the soundtracks worldwide.

Year	Titles (A-side, B-side) Both sides from same album except where indicated	Peak chart positions										Certifications	Album
Year	Titles (A-side, B-side) Both sides from same album except where indicated	US	US Dance	US R&B	AUS	CAN	GER	IRE	NL	NZ	UK	Certifications	Album
1975	"Love to Love You Baby" b/w "Need-A-Man Blues"	2	1	3	4	1	6	11	13	8	4	RIAA: Gold; MC: Gold	Love to Love You Baby
1976	"Could It Be Magic" b/w "Whispering Waves" (from Love to Love You Baby)	52	3	21	—	64	23	—	5	—	40		A Love Trilogy
1976	"Try Me, I Know We Can Make It" ^{[D]} b/w "Wasted"	80	1	35	—	68	42	—	—	—	—		A Love Trilogy
1976	"Spring Affair" ^{[D]} b/w "Come With Me" (from A Love Trilogy)	58	1	24	—	80	—	—	25	—	—		Four Seasons of Love
1977	"Winter Melody" b/w "Full of Emptiness (Reprise)" (from Love to Love You Baby)	43	1	21	—	59	—	20	—	—	27		Four Seasons of Love
1977	"Can't We Just Sit Down (And Talk It Over)" ^{[E]} b/w "I Feel Love"	—	1	20	—	—	—	—	—	—	—		I Remember Yesterday
1977	"I Feel Love" b/w "Can't We Just Sit Down (And Talk It Over)"	6	1	9	1	4	3	9	1	2	1	RIAA: Gold; BPI: Platinum; MC: Platinum	I Remember Yesterday
1977	"Theme from The Deep (Down, Deep Inside)" ^{[F]} b/w Instrumental version of A-side	—	3	—	70	—	25	—	5	—	5	BPI: Silver	"The Deep" soundtrack
1977	"I Remember Yesterday" (Part 1) ^{[F]} b/w "I Remember Yesterday (Part 2)"	—	1	—	—	—	—	—	20	—	14		I Remember Yesterday
1977	"Love's Unkind" ^{[F]} b/w "Black Lady"	—	1	—	—	—	18	2	28	—	3	BPI: Gold	I Remember Yesterday
1977	"I Love You" b/w "Once Upon a Time"	37	1	28	47	27	—	—	—	—	10		Once Upon a Time...
1977	"Fairy Tale High" ^{[G]} b/w "I Love You"	—	1	—	—	—	—	—	—	—	—		Once Upon a Time...
1977	"Once Upon a Time" ^{[H]} b/w "(Theme) Once Upon a Time"	—	1	—	—	—	—	—	—	—	—		Once Upon a Time...
1978	"Rumour Has It" b/w "(Theme) Once Upon a Time"	53	1	21	—	64	21	—	20	—	19		Once Upon a Time...
1978	"Back in Love Again" ^{[F]} b/w "Try Me, I Know, We Can Make It" / "Wasted" (both from A Love Trilogy) [GTO] "A Man Like You" (from Once Upon a Time) [Atlantic]	—	1	—	—	—	—	—	—	—	29		I Remember Yesterday
1978	"Last Dance" b/w "With Your Love"	3	1	5	69	4	—	—	10	3	51	RIAA: Gold; MC: Gold	Thank God It's Friday: The Original Motion Picture Soundtrack
1978	"Je t'aime... moi non plus" (Part 1) ^{[I]} b/w Part 2	—	—	—	—	—	—	—	—	—	—		Thank God It's Friday: The Original Motion Picture Soundtrack
1978	"MacArthur Park" b/w "Once Upon a Time (Live)"	1	1	8	8	1	39	7	8	4	5	RIAA: Gold; BPI: Silver; MC: Gold	Live and More
1978	"Heaven Knows" (with Brooklyn Dreams) b/w "Only One Man"	4	1	10	15	3	—	—	—	14	34	RIAA: Gold; MC: Gold	Live and More
1979	"Hot Stuff" b/w "Journey to the Center of Your Heart"	1	1	3	1	1	5	14	21	7	11	RIAA: Platinum; BPI: Silver; MC: Platinum	Bad Girls
1979	"Bad Girls" b/w "On My Honor"	1	1	1	14	1	9	23	10	6	14	RIAA: Platinum; BPI: Silver; MC: Platinum	Bad Girls
1979	"Dim All the Lights" b/w "There Will Always Be a You"	2	54	13	—	13	25	30	28	14	29	RIAA: Gold	Bad Girls
1979	"No More Tears (Enough Is Enough)" ^{[J]} (with Barbra Streisand) b/w "Lucky" (from Bad Girls)	1	1	20	8	2	31	7	27	7	3	RIAA: Platinum; BPI: Silver; MC: Gold	On the Radio: Greatest Hits Volumes I & II
1979	"On the Radio" b/w "There Will Always Be a You" (from Bad Girls)	5	8	9	36	2	34	18	27	32	32	RIAA: Gold	On the Radio: Greatest Hits Volumes I & II
1980	"Sunset People" ^{[F]} b/w "Our Love"	—	—	—	—	—	—	—	42	—	46		Bad Girls
1980	"Our Love" ^{[K]} b/w "Sunset People"	—	—	—	—	—	—	—	—	—	—		Bad Girls
1980	"Walk Away" b/w "Could It Be Magic" (from A Love Trilogy)	36	—	35	—	—	—	—	—	—	—		Bad Girls
"—" denotes a recording that did not chart or was not released in that territory.

- ^{D} Not released commercially in the United Kingdom.
- ^{E} Released commercially in selected countries (including North America and the Netherlands) with "I Feel Love" as the B-side. The two sides were switched around soon after release and issued with "Can't We Just Sit Down" as the B-side internationally.
- ^{F} Not released commercially in North America.
- ^{G} Released commercially in Germany only.
- ^{H} Released commercially in Japan only.
- ^{I} Released commercially in South America only.
- ^{J} Also released by Streisand's label (Columbia Records) on different formats in different countries (hence its inclusion in the "Guest Appearances" section also). Sales/airplay of all formats on both labels were amalgamated.
- ^{K} Released commercially in Spain only.

==== 1980–1991 (Geffen/Atlantic/Warner Bros. era) ====
These singles were all released commercially in at least one format in one country. Promotional formats may have also been released in that country/those countries or in others.

Summer's material during this era was released by three different Warner Bros. labels: Geffen, Atlantic and the main Warner Bros. label. In North America, Summer was signed to Geffen from 1980 to 1988 and Atlantic from 1989 to 1991. Internationally, Geffen released her material from 1980 to 1981 but all subsequent Geffen/Atlantic releases were released by Warner Bros. Records.

Summer's original North American label (Casablanca), now owned by PolyGram, also released two official Donna Summer singles in the United Kingdom in 1982 and 1983 respectively; these were new remixes and/or edits of two of Summer's biggest hits from during her time with that label. See notes below for details.

During Summer's court battle regarding her leaving Casablanca, it was decided that she still owed them an album. Subsequently, PolyGram's Mercury Records released the 1983 album She Works Hard For The Money, so all singles from that album were also released by Mercury.

Year	Titles (A-side, B-side) Both sides from same album except where indicated	Peak chart positions										Certifications	Album
Year	Titles (A-side, B-side) Both sides from same album except where indicated	US	US Dance	US R&B	AUS	CAN	GER	IRE	NL	NZ	UK	Certifications	Album
1980	"The Wanderer" b/w "Stop Me"	3	8	13	6	4	—	—	30	5	48	RIAA: Gold	The Wanderer
1980	"Cold Love" b/w "Grand Illusion"	33	8	—	—	—	—	30	—	—	44		The Wanderer
1981	"Who Do You Think You're Foolin'" b/w "Running for Cover"	40	8	—	100	—	—	—	—	—	—		The Wanderer
1981	"Looking Up" ^{[L]} b/w "Who Do You Think You're Foolin'"	—	8	—	—	—	—	—	—	—	—		The Wanderer
1982	"Love Is in Control (Finger on the Trigger)" b/w "Sometimes Like Butterflies"	10	3	4	17	4	—	14	12	40	18		Donna Summer
1982	"State of Independence" b/w "Love Is Just a Breath Away"	41	—	31	30	—	—	10	1	—	14		Donna Summer
1982	"I Feel Love" (Patrick Cowley Remixes) ^{[M]} 12" single b/w "Bad Girls" and "Hot Stuff" (both from Bad Girls)	—	—	—	—	—	—	18	—	—	21		—N/a
1982	"The Woman in Me" b/w "Livin' in America"	33	—	30	—	—	—	—	12	—	62		Donna Summer
1982	"Protection" ^{[N]} b/w "(If It Hurts Just a Little)" [Europe] "State of Independence" [Japan]	—	—	—	—	—	—	—	—	—	—		Donna Summer
1983	"Love to Love You Baby" (Young & Strong Edit) ^{[M]} 12" single b/w another mix of A-side	—	—	—	—	—	—	—	—	—	119		—N/a
1983	"She Works Hard for the Money" b/w "I Do Believe (I Fell in Love)"	3	3	1	4	4	11	26	18	23	25	MC: Gold	She Works Hard for the Money
1983	"Unconditional Love" (additional vocals by Musical Youth) b/w "Woman"	43	—	9	57	48	—	28	—	24	14		She Works Hard for the Money
1983	"Love Has a Mind of Its Own" (with Matthew Ward) b/w "Stop, Look and Listen"	70	—	35	—	—	—	—	—	—	103		She Works Hard for the Money
1983	"People People" ^{[O]} b/w "Tokyo"	—	—	—	—	—	—	—	—	—	—		She Works Hard for the Money
1983	"He's a Rebel" ^{[P]} b/w "Love Has a Mind of Its Own"	—	—	—	—	—	—	—	—	—	—		She Works Hard for the Money
1984	"Stop, Look and Listen" ^{[M]} b/w "Tokyo"	—	—	—	—	—	—	—	—	—	57		She Works Hard for the Money
1984	"There Goes My Baby" b/w "Maybe It's Over"	21	—	20	52	31	—	—	31	—	99		Cats Without Claws
1984	"Supernatural Love" b/w "Face the Music" (Non-album track)	75	39	51	—	—	—	—	—	—	126		Cats Without Claws
1985	"Eyes" ^{[Q]} b/w "It's Not the Way"	—	—	—	—	—	—	—	—	—	97		Cats Without Claws
1987	"Dinner with Gershwin" b/w instrumental version of A-side (Non-album track)	48	13	10	—	39	—	13	43	—	13		All Systems Go
1987	"Only the Fool Survives" ^{[R]} (with Mickey Thomas) b/w "Love Shock"	—	—	—	—	43	—	—	—	—	—		All Systems Go
1988	"All Systems Go" ^{[Q]} /	—	—	—	—	—	—	—	—	—	54		All Systems Go
1988	"Fascination" ^{[S]}	—	—	—	—	—	—	—	—	—	—		All Systems Go
1989	"This Time I Know It's for Real" b/w "If It Makes You Feel Good"	7	5	—	40	6	15	4	6	—	3	RIAA: Gold; BPI: Silver	Another Place and Time
1989	"I Don't Wanna Get Hurt" ^{[Q]} b/w instrumental version of A-side (Non-album track)	—	—	—	—	—	25	3	29	—	7		Another Place and Time
1989	"Love's About to Change My Heart" b/w another mix of A-side (Non-album track)	85	3	—	71	—	—	11	59	—	20		Another Place and Time
1989	"Breakaway" ^{[S]} b/w "Thinkin' Bout My Baby" (Non-album track)	—	—	—	—	—	—	—	—	—	—		Another Place and Time
1989	"When Love Takes Over You" ^{[Q]} b/w "Bad Reputation" (from All Systems Go)	—	—	—	—	—	—	—	—	—	72		Another Place and Time
1990	"State of Independence" ^{[Q]} (re-release) b/w "Love Is Just a Breath Away"	—	—	—	—	—	—	—	69	—	45		The Best Of Donna Summer
1990	"Breakaway" (Remix) b/w "Love Is in Control" (from Donna Summer)	—	31	—	—	—	—	—	—	—	49		The Best Of Donna Summer
1991	"When Love Cries" b/w "What Is It You Want"	77	41	18	—	—	—	—	—	—	—		Mistaken Identity
1991	"Work That Magic" b/w "Let There Be Peace"	—	—	—	147	—	—	—	—	—	74		Mistaken Identity
"—" denotes a recording that did not chart or was not released in that territory.

- ^{L} Released commercially in Japan only.
- ^{M} Released commercially in the United Kingdom only.
- ^{N} Released commercially in Belgium, The Netherlands and Japan only.
- ^{O} Released commercially in The Netherlands only.
- ^{P} Released commercially in Spain only.
- ^{Q} Not released commercially in North America.
- ^{R} Released commercially in North America and Japan only.
- ^{S} Released commercially in North America only.

==== 1993–2020 ====
These singles were all released commercially in at least one format in one country. Promotional formats may have also been released in that country/those countries or in others.

Several of the singles from this era are in fact from albums by various artists on which Summer appeared.

PolyGram released the 1994 compilation album Endless Summer, so the two singles from that album (both newly recorded tracks) were released on Mercury, as were the 1999 and 2000 re-releases of "Last Dance" and "I Feel Love" respectively.

The remixes of "I Feel Love" and "State of Independence" were released by the former UK-based Manifesto label, a division of Universal (who had owned the rights to much of Summer's back catalogue for some time).

Summer signed to Sony in 1999 and both her singles from that year were released by their Epic label. Summer's final album (2008's Crayons) and the singles from it were released by Sony's Burgundy Records.

Universal released 2005's "I Got Your Love", originally featured two years earlier in the television series Sex and the City.

The final Donna Summer single, "To Paris with Love" was released on her own Driven by the Music label.

The posthumous remix album released in 2013 (entitled Love to Love You Donna) and its singles were released by Verve Records, by then part of Universal Music Group, who had long since owned the rights to Summer's Casablanca/PolyGram recordings from 1975 to 1983.

Year	Title	Peak chart positions							Album
Year	Title	US	US Dance	AUS	GER	IRE	NL	UK	Album
1993	"La Vie en rose" ^{[T]}	—	—	—	—	—	—	—	Tribute to Edith Piaf
1994	"Melody of Love (Wanna Be Loved)"	—	1	79	—	—	—	21	Endless Summer: Donna Summer's Greatest Hits
1994	"Any Way at All" ^{[U]}	—	—	—	—	—	—	—	Endless Summer: Donna Summer's Greatest Hits
1995	"I Feel Love" (Remixes)	—	9	80	—	24	26	8	—N/a
1996	"State of Independence" (Remixes) ^{[V]}	—	—	—	—	—	—	13	—N/a
1996	"Whenever There Is Love" ^{[W]} (with Bruce Roberts)	—^{[W]}	—	—	—	—	—	—	Daylight
1997	"Carry On" (Remixes) (with Giorgio Moroder)	—	25	—	—	—	—	65	—N/a
1999	"I Will Go with You (Con te partirò)"	79	1	97	—	—	59	44	Live & More Encore
1999	"Love Is the Healer" ^{[W]}	—	1	—	—	—	—	—	Live & More Encore
1999	"Last Dance" ^{[X]} (Re-release)	—	—	—	—	—	—	—	—N/a
2000	"I Feel Love" ^{[X]} (Re-release)	—	—	—	—	—	—	—	—N/a
2000	"The Power of One" ^{[U]}	—	2	—	—	—	—	—	Pokémon: The Movie 2000
2005	"I Got Your Love" ^{[U]}	—	4	—	—	—	—	—	—N/a
2006	"Power of Love" ^{[U]}	—	43	—	—	—	—	—	So Amazing: An All-Star Tribute to Luther Vandross
2008	"I'm a Fire"	—	1	—	—	—	—	—	Crayons
2008	"Stamp Your Feet"	—	1	195	88	—	—	—	Crayons
2008	"It's Only Love" ^{[U]}	—	—	—	—	—	—	—	Crayons
2009	"Fame (The Game)"	—	1	—	—	—	—	—	Crayons
2010	"To Paris with Love"	—	1	—	—	—	—	—	—N/a
2012	"I Feel Love" (Download)	—	—	—	—	—	—	45	—N/a
2013	"Love Is in Control (Finger on the Trigger)" (Chromeo & Oliver Remix)	—	—	—	—	—	—	—	Love to Love You Donna
2013	"Love to Love You Baby" (Giorgio Moroder Remix)	—	—	—	—	—	—	—	Love to Love You Donna
2013	"MacArthur Park" (Laidback Luke Remix)	—	1	—	—	—	—	—	Love to Love You Donna
2017	"Enough Is Enough 2017" (with Barbra Streisand)	—	3	—	—	—	—	—	—N/a
2018	"Hot Stuff 2018"	—	1	—	—	—	—	—	—N/a
2020	"Hot Stuff" (with Kygo)	—	—	—	74	—	—	—	—N/a
"—" denotes a recording that did not chart or was not released in that territory.

- ^{T} Released commercially in France only.
- ^{U} Released commercially in North America only.
- ^{V} Released commercially in the United Kingdom only.
- ^{W} Not released commercially in the United Kingdom. Did not enter the Billboard Hot 100, but peaked at number nine on the Bubbling Under Hot 100 Singles chart.
- ^{X} Not released commercially in North America.

=== Promotional singles ===
Year	Title	Peaks	Album
Year	Title	US Dance	Album
1978	"With Your Love" ^{[Z]}	1	Thank God It's Friday: The Original Motion Picture Soundtrack
1979	"On My Honor" ^{[Y]}	—	Bad Girls
1987	"Thinkin' Bout My Baby" ^{[Y]}	—	All Systems Go
1993	"Don't Cry for Me Argentina" ^{[Z]}	—	The Donna Summer Anthology
1999	"Donna Summer Medley" ^{[Z]}	—	Live & More Encore
2003	"You're So Beautiful" ^{[Z]}	5	The Journey: The Very Best of Donna Summer
2003	"Dream-A-Lot's Theme (I Will Live for Love)" ^{[Z]}	20	The Journey: The Very Best of Donna Summer
2005	"I Feel Love" ^{[!]} (Remixes)	—	—N/a

- ^{Y} Released in the United Kingdom only.
- ^{Z} Released in North America only.

=== Other charted songs ===
Year	Title	Peak	Album
Year	Title	US Dance	Album
1976	"Wasted"/"Come with Me"	7	A Love Trilogy

Dance Club Play chart entries

From the inception of the Billboard Dance Club Play chart (also known as Club Play Singles, and formerly known as Hot Dance Club Play and Hot Dance/Disco) until the week of February 16, 1991, several (or even all) songs on an EP or album could occupy the same position if more than one track from a release was receiving significant play in clubs. Beginning with the February 23, 1991, issue, the dance chart became "song specific," meaning only one song could occupy each position at a time. Therefore;

- "Wasted" and "Come With Me" charted at #7 due to their inclusion on the A Love Trilogy album, so the chart position is in fact for the entire album. The reason these two tracks have been singled out is because the other two tracks on the album ("Could It Be Magic" and "Try Me, I Know We Can Make It") reached their own peak positions when they were released as singles.
- "Spring Affair" and "Winter Melody" both appear on Summer's Four Seasons of Love album, so their #1 position is actually for the whole album.
- "Can't We Just Sit Down (And Talk It Over)", "I Feel Love", "I Remember Yesterday", "Love's Unkind" and "Back in Love Again" all appear on Summer's I Remember Yesterday album, so their #1 position is also for the full album..
- "I Love You", "Fairy Tale High", "Once Upon a Time" and "Rumour Has It" all appear on her Once Upon a Time album, so again the #1 position is in fact for the whole album.
- "Last Dance" shared its entry with three other tracks from the Thank God It's Friday film soundtrack, none of which were sung by Summer (though she was credited as co-writer and background vocalist on "Take It to the Zoo", a track by her sisters' group Sunshine.
- "MacArthur Park" and "Heaven Knows" are both part of a medley titled "MacArthur Park Suite," which was released as a 12" single for use in clubs. A slightly different version appears on the Live And More album.
- "Hot Stuff" and "Bad Girls" was released for use in clubs as a continuous medley on a one-sided 12" single, so these two also count as one #1 on this chart.
- "The Wanderer", "Cold Love", "Who Do You Think You're Foolin'", and "Looking Up" all appear on Summer's The Wanderer album, so yet again their entry is for the whole album.

== Guest appearances ==
All of the following singles were released commercially.

Year	Title	Peak chart positions										Certifications	Album
Year	Title	US	US Dance	US R&B	AUS	CAN	GER	IRE	NL	NZ	UK	Certifications	Album
1977	"Shut Out" (Paul Jabara featuring special guest Donna Summer)	—	31	—	—	—	—	—	—	—	—		Shut Out
1979	"No More Tears (Enough Is Enough)" ^{[AA]} (with Barbra Streisand)	1	1	20	8	2	31	7	27	7	3	RIAA: Platinum; MC: Gold	Wet
1980	"Foggy Day/Never Lose Your Sense of Humor" (with Paul Jabara)	—	—	—	—	—	—	—	—	—	—		The Third Album
1989	"Spirit of the Forest" (as part of charity group Spirit of the Forest)	—	—	—	—	—	—	—	—	—	—		—N/a
1992	"Carry On" (Giorgio Moroder featuring Donna Summer)	—	—	—	—	—	—	—	—	—	—		Forever Dancing
2012	"Angel" (O'Mega Red featuring Donna Summer)	—	—	—	—	—	—	—	—	—	—		—N/a
"—" denotes a recording that did not chart or was not released in that territory.

- ^{AA} Also released by Summer's label on different formats in different countries (hence its inclusion in the main section also). Sales/airplay of all formats on both labels were amalgamated.

== Music videos ==
Year	Title	Album
1975	"Lady of the Night"	Lady of the Night
1975	"Love to Love You Baby"	Love to Love You Baby
1976	"Try Me, I Know We Can Make It"	A Love Trilogy
1976	"Could It Be Magic"	A Love Trilogy
1976	"Spring Affair"	Four Seasons of Love
1976	"Autumn Changes"	Four Seasons of Love
1976	"Winter Melody"	Four Seasons of Love
1977	"I Remember Yesterday"	I Remember Yesterday
1978	"Last Dance"	Thank God It's Friday soundtrack
1978	"Fairy Tale High"	Once Upon a Time...
1979	"Bridge Over Troubled Water" (feat. Robert Guillaume; not official - TV appearance)	non-album
1979	"Bad Girls" (not official - TV appearance)	Bad Girls
1979	"Sunset People"	Bad Girls
1979	"My Man Medley" (not official - TV appearance)	non-album
1980	"The Wanderer"	The Wanderer
1982	"Love Is in Control (Finger on the Trigger)"	Donna Summer
1982	"State of Independence"	Donna Summer
1982	"The Woman in Me"	Donna Summer
1983	"Romeo"	Flashdance soundtrack
1983	"She Works Hard for the Money"	She Works Hard for the Money
1983	"Unconditional Love"	She Works Hard for the Money
1984	"Supernatural Love"	Cats Without Claws
1984	"There Goes My Baby"	Cats Without Claws
1987	"Dinner with Gershwin"	All Systems Go
1987	"Dinner with Gershwin (Remix)"	All Systems Go
1987	"All Systems Go"	All Systems Go
1987	"Love Shock"	All Systems Go
1989	"This Time I Know It's for Real"	Another Place and Time
1989	"This Time I Know It's for Real (Remix)"	Another Place and Time
1989	"Love's About to Change My Heart"	Another Place and Time
1989	"I Don't Wanna Get Hurt"	Another Place and Time
1990	"When Love Takes Over You"	Another Place and Time
1991	"Work That Magic"	Mistaken Identity
1994	"Melody of Love (Wanna Be Loved)"	Endless Summer: Donna Summer's Greatest Hits
1994	"Endless Summer Medley"	non-album
1995	"I Feel Love (Remix)"	non-album
1996	"Whenever There Is Love" (with Bruce Roberts)	Daylight soundtrack
1999	"My Prayer for You"	Sing Me to Sleep, Mommy
1999	"I Will Go with You (Con te partirò)"	Live & More Encore
1999	"I Will Go with You (Con te partirò) (Big Red Remix)"	Live & More Encore
2008	"Stamp Your Feet"	Crayons
2008	"Mr. Music"	Crayons
2008	"The Queen Is Back"	Crayons
2009	"Fame (The Game)"	Crayons
