= List of Billboard number-one disco singles of 1977 =

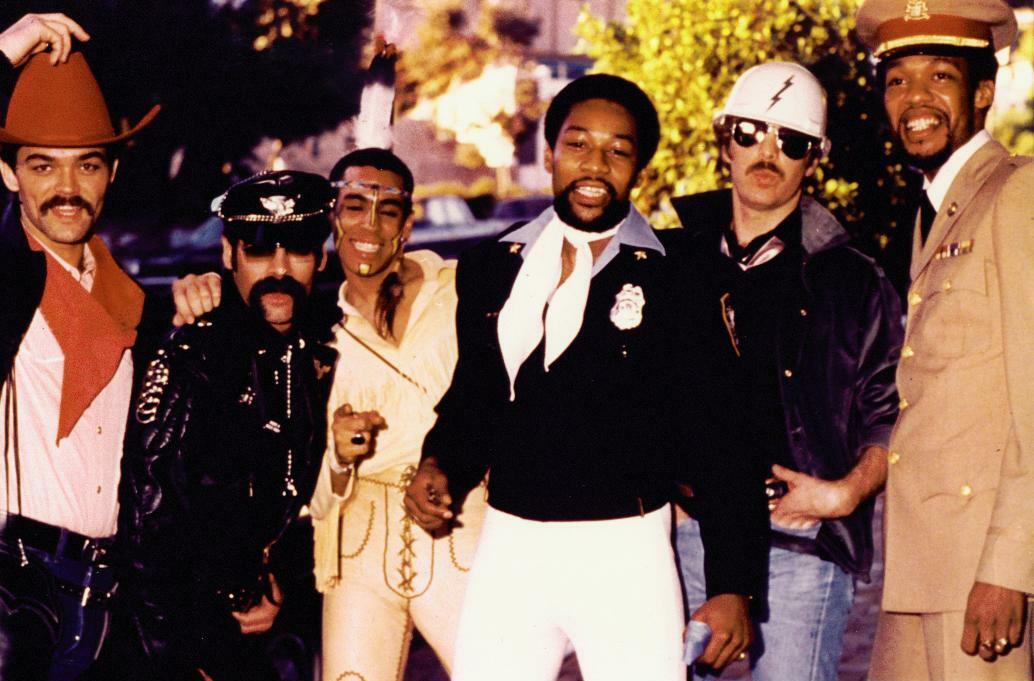
Village People spent seven consecutive weeks at number one with several tracks from their self-titled album.

The National Disco Action Top 40 was a chart published weekly by Billboard magazine in the United States, which ranked the popularity of disco singles in nightclubs across the country, based on a national survey of club disc jockeys. Launched in 1976, the chart combined the data from 15 major markets, and there were 12 different number ones. The chart methodology of the time allowed for multiple songs ("cuts") from a 12-inch single or album to be bracketed together as a single listing if more than one track from the release was receiving significant play in clubs.

Thelma Houston had the year's first number one, spending her second consecutive week at number one with "Don't Leave Me This Way" and "Any Way You Like It" on the chart dated January 1. The songs remained atop the chart through the issue dated January 29, before being displaced by "Disco Inferno", "Starvin'", and "Body Contact Contract" by the Trammps, three songs from the group's album Disco Inferno. "Don't Leave Me This Way" was the only song to top both the disco chart and the all-genre Hot 100 during 1977, although it did not reach the top spot on the Hot 100 until late April, nearly four months after it first topped the disco listing. In contrast, neither of the two songs by Love & Kisses which topped the disco chart entered the Hot 100 at all. The Eurodisco act's lengthy tracks proved extremely popular with nightclub DJs but were generally not deemed suitable for top 40 radio airplay, limiting their mainstream appeal.

The band Chic achieved the year's longest-running number one, spending eight consecutive weeks atop the chart with "Dance, Dance, Dance (Yowsah, Yowsah, Yowsah)". For the final two weeks, the song "Everybody Dance" was also listed. The eight weeks which the songs spent at number also made Chic the act with the highest total number of weeks in the top spot during 1977, one week ahead of Village People. The only act with more than one number one during the year was Donna Summer, known as the "Queen of Disco". Combined tracks from her album I Remember Yesterday spent three weeks in the peak position in July, and in December she returned to the top spot with all the cuts from her next album Once Upon a Time; this was the year's final chart-topper.

== Chart history ==
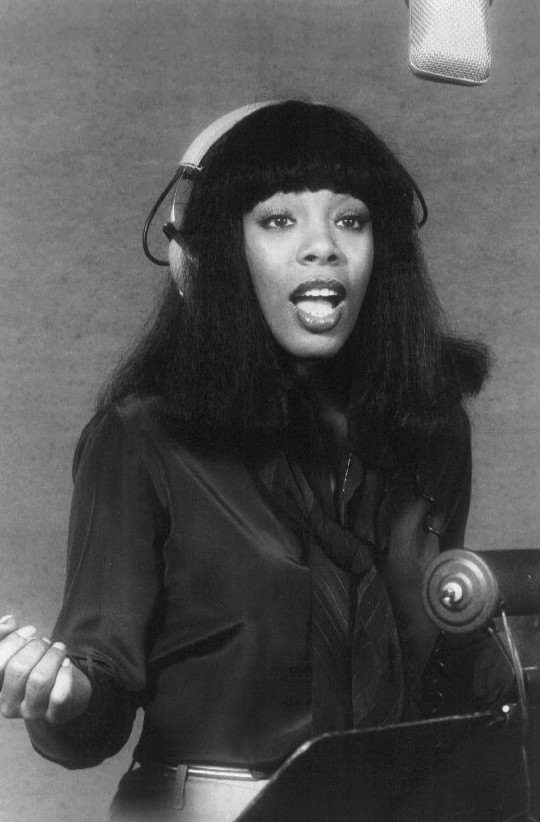
Two of Donna Summer's albums topped the chart.

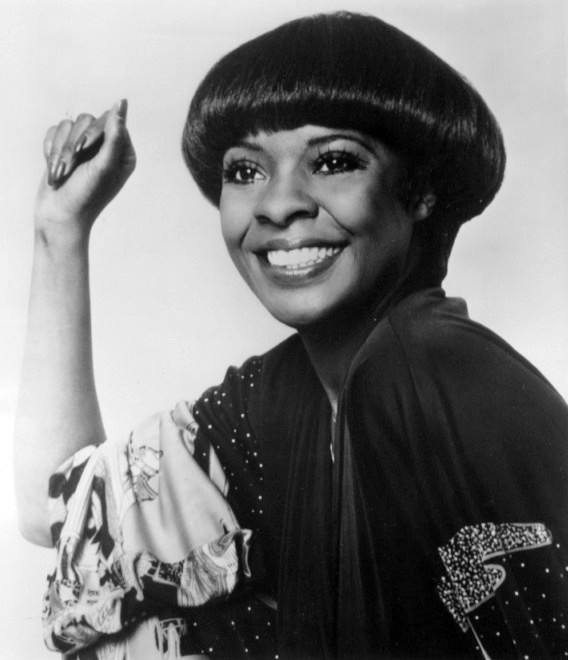
Thelma Houston topped the chart in January.

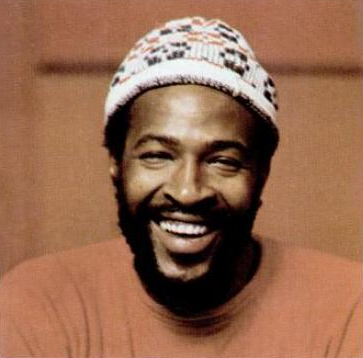
"Got to Give It Up" was a number one for Marvin Gaye.

Issue date	Title(s)	Artist(s)	Ref.
January 1	"Don't Leave Me This Way" / "Any Way You Like It"	Thelma Houston	
January 8	"Don't Leave Me This Way" / "Any Way You Like It"	Thelma Houston	
January 15	"Don't Leave Me This Way" / "Any Way You Like It"	Thelma Houston	
January 22	"Don't Leave Me This Way" / "Any Way You Like It"	Thelma Houston	
January 29	"Don't Leave Me This Way" / "Any Way You Like It"	Thelma Houston	
February 5	"Disco Inferno" / "Starvin'" / "Body Contact Contract"	The Trammps	
February 12	"Disco Inferno" / "Starvin'" / "Body Contact Contract"	The Trammps	
February 19	"Disco Inferno" / "Starvin'" / "Body Contact Contract"	The Trammps	
February 26	"Disco Inferno" / "Starvin'" / "Body Contact Contract"	The Trammps	
March 5	"Disco Inferno" / "Starvin'" / "Body Contact Contract"	The Trammps	
March 12	"Disco Inferno" / "Starvin'" / "Body Contact Contract"	The Trammps	
March 19	"Do What You Wanna Do"	T-Connection	
March 26	"Do What You Wanna Do"	T-Connection	
April 2	"Do What You Wanna Do"	T-Connection	
April 9	"Do What You Wanna Do"	T-Connection	
April 16	"Do What You Wanna Do"	T-Connection	
April 23	"Do What You Wanna Do"	T-Connection	
April 30	"Do What You Wanna Do"	T-Connection	
May 7	"I Need a Man"	Grace Jones	
May 14	"I Need a Man"	Grace Jones	
May 21	"Got to Give It Up"	Marvin Gaye	
May 28	"Devil's Gun" / "We Got Our Own Thing"	C. J. & Company	
June 4	"Devil's Gun" / "We Got Our Own Thing"	C. J. & Company	
June 11	"Devil's Gun" / "We Got Our Own Thing"	C. J. & Company	
June 18	"Devil's Gun" / "We Got Our Own Thing"	C. J. & Company	
June 25	"Devil's Gun" / "We Got Our Own Thing"	C. J. & Company	
July 2	"I Feel Love" / "I Remember Yesterday Medley" / "Love's Unkind" / "Take Me" (Note: "Love's Unkind" only listed in the issue dated July 2, "Take Me" only listed in the issues dated July 9 and July 16)	Donna Summer	
July 9	"I Feel Love" / "I Remember Yesterday Medley" / "Love's Unkind" / "Take Me"	Donna Summer	
July 16	"I Feel Love" / "I Remember Yesterday Medley" / "Love's Unkind" / "Take Me"	Donna Summer	
July 23	"Accidental Lover" / "I Found Love (Now That I Found You)"	Love & Kisses	
July 30	"Accidental Lover" / "I Found Love (Now That I Found You)"	Love & Kisses	
August 6	"Accidental Lover" / "I Found Love (Now That I Found You)"	Love & Kisses	
August 13	"Quiet Village" / "African Queens" / "Summer Dance"	The Ritchie Family	
August 20	"Quiet Village" / "African Queens" / "Summer Dance"	The Ritchie Family	
August 27	"Quiet Village" / "African Queens" / "Summer Dance"	The Ritchie Family	
September 3	"San Francisco (You've Got Me)" / "Hollywood" / "Fire Island"	Village People	
September 10	"San Francisco (You've Got Me)" / "Hollywood" / "Fire Island"	Village People	
September 17	"San Francisco (You've Got Me)" / "Hollywood" / "Fire Island"	Village People	
September 24	"San Francisco (You've Got Me)" / "Hollywood" / "Fire Island"	Village People	
October 1	"San Francisco (You've Got Me)" / "Hollywood" / "Fire Island"	Village People	
October 8	"San Francisco (You've Got Me)" / "Hollywood" / "Fire Island"	Village People	
October 15	"San Francisco (You've Got Me)" / "Hollywood" / "Fire Island"	Village People	
October 22	"Dance, Dance, Dance (Yowsah, Yowsah, Yowsah)" / "Everybody Dance" (Note: "Everybody Dance" only listed in issues dated December 3 and December 10)	Chic	
October 29	"Dance, Dance, Dance (Yowsah, Yowsah, Yowsah)" / "Everybody Dance"	Chic	
November 5	"Dance, Dance, Dance (Yowsah, Yowsah, Yowsah)" / "Everybody Dance"	Chic	
November 12	"Dance, Dance, Dance (Yowsah, Yowsah, Yowsah)" / "Everybody Dance"	Chic	
November 19	"Dance, Dance, Dance (Yowsah, Yowsah, Yowsah)" / "Everybody Dance"	Chic	
November 26	"Dance, Dance, Dance (Yowsah, Yowsah, Yowsah)" / "Everybody Dance"	Chic	
December 3	"Dance, Dance, Dance (Yowsah, Yowsah, Yowsah)" / "Everybody Dance"	Chic	
December 10	"Dance, Dance, Dance (Yowsah, Yowsah, Yowsah)" / "Everybody Dance"	Chic	
December 17	Once Upon a Time... (all cuts)	Donna Summer	
December 24	Once Upon a Time... (all cuts)	Donna Summer	
December 31	Once Upon a Time... (all cuts)	Donna Summer	

== See also ==
- 1977 in music
- List of Billboard Hot 100 number ones of 1977
