= I Remember Yesterday =

Studio album by Donna Summer
- Released: May 13, 1977
- Recorded: October 1976 – February 1977
- Studios: Musicland and Arco, Munich.
- Genres: Eurodisco; pop; R&B
- Length: 35:19
- Label: Casablanca
- Producers: Giorgio Moroder, Pete Bellotte

Donna Summer chronology
Four Seasons of Love (1976)	I Remember Yesterday (1977)	Once Upon a Time (1977)

Singles from I Remember Yesterday
- 1. "Can't We Just Sit Down (And Talk It Over)" Released: May 1, 1977; 2. "I Feel Love" Released: July 2, 1977; 3. "I Remember Yesterday" Released: September 4, 1977; 4. "Love's Unkind" Released: November 29, 1977; 5. "Back in Love Again" Released: April 4, 1978

I Remember Yesterday is the fifth studio album by American singer-songwriter Donna Summer. It was released on May 13, 1977, seven months after the release of her previous album. Like her previous three albums, it was a concept album, this time seeing Summer combining the recent disco sound with various sounds of the past. I Remember Yesterday includes the singles "Can't We Just Sit Down (And Talk It Over)", "I Feel Love", the title track, "Love's Unkind" and "Back in Love Again". "I Feel Love" and "Love's Unkind" proved to be the album's most popular and enduring hits, the former of which came to be one of Summer's signature songs.

The album was recorded in Munich at Musicland Studios and Arco Studios with Summer's long-term collaborators and production team headed by producers Giorgio Moroder and Pete Bellotte. Arrangements were handled by Thor Baldursson. The artwork was designed by Gribbitt! with photography by Victor Skrebneski.

== Music ==
Side One of the LP saw Summer "remembering yesterday" by combining the electronic disco sound with sounds of the 1940s ("I Remember Yesterday"), 1950s ("Love's Unkind") and 1960s ("Back in Love Again"). Side Two consisted of two pop/disco tracks, a ballad and finished with a disco song supposedly representing "the future" that would become one of the most famous songs of that genre – "I Feel Love". With the exception of the ballad "Can't We Just Sit Down (And Talk It Over)", all the songs were written in collaboration by Summer, Giorgio Moroder and Pete Bellotte.

As with Summer's last few albums, different record labels distributed her work in different nations. Some of the labels chose to release the ballad "Can't We Just Sit Down (And Talk It Over)" as the first single, with "I Feel Love" as the B-side. However, the impact of the song was so huge that it was soon released internationally as an A-side. Previous disco tracks had usually been backed by an acoustic orchestra, the use of synthesizers would later develop new sub-genres of music such as dance and techno. Summer's repetitive vocals over the backing track helped make the song a massive hit. It finally gave her a follow-up in the US to her initial hit ("Love to Love You Baby"), and made number six on the Hot 100 singles chart. It was also a huge hit in Europe, and became a number one hit in the UK. "I Feel Love" firmly secured Donna Summer's place as the leading female artist of disco music.

== Image ==
Summer's sexually oriented image seemed less prominent on this album, perhaps due to the slight departure from the regular disco sound and the fusion of this sound with the older sounding songs. In fact the lyrics to "Love's Unkind" in particular were very non-sexual compared to many of the love-themed songs Summer had recorded (the songs tells the story of a schoolgirl with a crush on one of her classmates). A couple of the "newer" styled songs on Side Two were slightly more of a sexual nature – namely "Take Me" and "I Feel Love". Around the same time as the album's release, Summer would further her reputation as a serious and credible artist when she was asked to record the theme song for the film The Deep by famous British composer John Barry. The song, "Down Deep Inside" was also released as a single and became another hit for Summer (Top five in the UK).

== Release and reception ==
Professional ratings
Review scores
Source	Rating
AllMusic	3/5 stars
Christgau's Record Guide	B−
Encyclopedia of Popular Music	3/5 stars
Music Week	4/4 stars
Record Mirror	2/5 stars

Helped by the phenomenal success of "I Feel Love", the I Remember Yesterday album became her biggest so far. It produced several more hit singles in Europe, notably the title track (a UK Top 20 hit) and "Love's Unkind", which became a number three hit in the UK, making it one of her biggest and most remembered hits there. "Back in Love Again" was also a European single and became a Top 40 in the UK as well. It also peaked at number eighteen on the US Billboard 200, number eleven on the Top R&B/Hip-Hop Albums chart and number three on the UK Albums Chart. It remains Summer's only top ten studio album in the UK. The entire album charted as one entry at number one on the Hot Dance/Disco chart.

== Artwork ==
The album's back cover features a provocative image of Summer posing in a long skirt, in a spread-eagle squat, with hands crossed at her crotch. The image was used for the single release of "Can't We Just Sit Down (And Talk It Over)" b/w "I Feel Love", and later as the image for the "I Feel Love" single when it became a smash hit.

== Track listing ==
All tracks written by Donna Summer, Giorgio Moroder and Pete Bellotte except where noted; all tracks produced by Moroder and Bellotte

Side one
No.	Title	Length
1.	"I Remember Yesterday"	4:45
2.	"Love's Unkind"	4:29
3.	"Back in Love Again"	3:54
4.	"I Remember Yesterday (Reprise)"	3:02

Side two
No.	Title	Writer(s)	Length
1.	"Black Lady"		3:47
2.	"Take Me"		5:03
3.	"Can't We Just Sit Down (And Talk It Over)"	Tony Macaulay	4:25
4.	"I Feel Love"		5:53

== Personnel ==
- Donna Summer – lead vocals
- Thor Baldursson – keyboards, Moog synthesizer, Moog bass, arrangements
- Giorgio Moroder – Moog synthesizer
- Robby Wedel – Moog synthesizer
- Geoff Barstow – guitars
- Mats Björklund – guitars
- Les Hurdle – bass guitar
- Keith Forsey – drums, percussion
- Hanus Berka – brass (saxophones)
- Benny Gebauer – brass (saxophones, woodwinds)
- Dino Solera – brass (woodwinds), solos
- Franco Taormina – brass (saxophones)
- Hermann Breuer – brass (trombone)
- Rudi Füssers – brass (trombone)
- Lee Harper – brass (trumpet)
- James Polivka – brass (trumpet)
- Brooklyn Dreams – backing vocals
- Pattie Brooks – backing vocals
- Marti McCall – backing vocals
- Dani McCormick – backing vocals
- Petsye Powell – backing vocals

Production

- Pete Bellotte – producer
- Giorgio Moroder – producer
- Jürgen Koppers – engineer, mixing
- Brian Gardner – mastering at Allen Zentz Mastering (San Clemente, California)
- Gribbitt! – design
- Victor Skrebneski – photography

== Charts ==
=== Weekly charts ===
Weekly chart performance for I Remember Yesterday
Chart (1977)	Peak position
Argentine Albums (CAPIF)	3
Australian Albums (Kent Music Report)	4
Austrian Albums (Ö3 Austria)	3
Canada Top Albums/CDs (RPM)	15
Dutch Albums (Album Top 100)	6
Finnish Albums (Suomen virallinen lista)	4
French Albums (SNEP)	4
German Albums (Offizielle Top 100)	7
Italian Albums (Musica e dischi)	1
Japanese Albums (Oricon)	77
New Zealand Albums (RMNZ)	12
Norwegian Albums (VG-lista)	5
Portuguese Albums (Musica & Som)	5
Spanish Albums (Promusicae)	1
Swedish Albums (Sverigetopplistan)	13
UK Albums (Official Charts)	3
US Billboard 200	18
US Top R&B/Hip-Hop Albums (Billboard)	11

=== Year-end charts ===
1977 year-end chart performance for I Remember Yesterday
Chart (1977)	Position
Australian Albums (Kent Music Report)	21
Austrian Albums (Ö3 Austria)	9
Canada Top Albums/CDs (RPM)	84
Dutch Albums (Album Top 100)	44
German Albums (Offizielle Top 100)	48
UK Albums (OCC)	25
US Billboard 200	63
US Top R&B/Hip-Hop Albums (Billboard)	34

== Certifications and sales ==
Region	Certification	Certified units/sales
France (SNEP)	Gold	100,000^{*}
United Kingdom (BPI)	Gold	100,000^{^}
United States (RIAA)	Platinum	1,000,000^{^}
^{*} Sales figures based on certification alone.^{^} Shipments figures based on certification alone.
