= Walter Goss =

American sound engineer (1928–2012)

- Born: July 21, 1928
- Died: July 26, 2012 (aged 84)
- Occupation: Sound engineer
- Years active: 1963 – 1991

Walter Goss (July 21, 1928 – July 26, 2012) was an American sound engineer. He was nominated for an Academy Award in the category Best Sound for the film The Deep.

== Selected filmography ==
- The Deep (1977)
