= Messiah (UK duo) =

British techno/acid house duo

Messiah were a British techno/acid house duo formed in London in 1988 by members Mark Davies and Ali Ghani.

== Biography ==
Known for their heavy use of sampling quotes from films, melodic female vocals, and aggressive synthesizer lines, the group released two full-length albums and several singles during the 1990s, the first being “20,000 Hardcore Members” in 1991. Two singles, "Temple of Dreams" and "I Feel Love" reached the top 20 of the UK Singles Chart.

== Discography ==
=== Albums ===
- 21st Century Jesus (1993, Warner Music UK; American Recordings US)
- Messiah Presents Progenitor (1997, Thirsty Ear)

=== Singles ===
Year	Single	Label	Peak chart positions		
Year	Single	Label	UK	AUS	US Dance
1991	"20,000 Hardcore Members"	Kickin	—	—	—
1991	"Prince of Darkness" / "I Am Evil"	Deja Vu	—	—	—
1991	"There Is No Law"	Kickin	—	—	—
1992	"Temple of Dreams"	Kickin	20	105	10
1992	"There Is No Law"	Kickin	—	—	—
1992	"I Feel Love"	Kickin	19	66	15
1993	"Thunderdome"	WEA	29	—	—
1996	"Sway"	Some Bizzare	—	—	—
1997	"Let Tyrants Tremble"	Some Bizzare	—	—	—
1997	"Meditator"	Thirsty Ear	—	—	—
"—" denotes releases that did not chart.
