= Love to Love You Donna =

Remix album by Donna Summer
- Released: 22 October 2013
- Genres: Electronic; disco; house
- Length: 64:00
- Label: Verve
- Producers: Dahlia Ambach Caplin; Randall Poster; Bruce Sudano (exec.)

Donna Summer chronology
Crayons (2008)	Love to Love You Donna (2013)	Hits, Singles, and More (2015)

Singles from Love to Love You Donna
- 1. "Love Is in Control (Finger on the Trigger)" Released: 28 August 2013; 2. "Love to Love You Baby" Released: 23 September 2013; 3. "MacArthur Park" Released: 17 December 2013

Professional ratings
Aggregate scores
Source	Rating
Metacritic	59/100
Review scores
Source	Rating
AllMusic	2.5/5 stars
The Irish Times	3/5 stars
The Line of Best Fit	5.5/10
Slant Magazine	3/5 stars

Love to Love You Donna is the remix album by American singer Donna Summer. It was released on 22 October 2013 by Verve Records. The album was Summer's first posthumous release after her death from lung cancer in May 2012, and achieved some success in the United States, debuting and peaking at number 97 on the Billboard 200.

== Track listing ==
Love to Love You Donna – Standard edition
No.	Title	Writer(s)	Length
1.	"Love to Love You Baby" (Giorgio Moroder feat. Chris Cox remix)	Donna Summer; Giorgio Moroder; Pete Bellotte	4:19
2.	"Dim All the Lights" (Duke Dumont remix)	Summer	6:00
3.	"Hot Stuff" (Frankie Knuckles and Eric Kupper as director's cut signature mix)	Bellotte; Harold Faltermeyer; Keith Forsey	5:59
4.	"I Feel Love" (Afrojack remix)	Summer; Moroder; Bellotte	6:00
5.	"Love Is in Control (Finger on the Trigger)" (Chromeo & Oliver remix)	Quincy Jones; Rod Temperton; Merria Ross	4:01
6.	"Sunset People" (Hot Chip dub edit)	Bellotte; Faltermeyer; Forsey	7:38
7.	"Working the Midnight Shift" (Holy Ghost! remix)	Summer; Moroder; Bellotte	5:29
8.	"Bad Girls" (Gigamesh remix)	Summer; Bruce Sudano; Edward "Eddie" Hokenson; Joe "Bean" Esposito	5:22
9.	"MacArthur Park" (Laidback Luke remix)	Jimmy Webb	5:40
10.	"I Feel Love" (Benga Remix)	Summer; Moroder; Bellotte	7:13
11.	"On the Radio" (Jacques Greene remix)	Summer; Moroder	5:58
12.	"Last Dance" (Masters at Work remix short version)	Paul Jabara	6:30
13.	"La Dolce Vita" (featuring Giorgio Moroder)	Summer; Moroder; Nathan DiGesare	4:13
Total length:			64:00

Love to Love You Donna – Deluxe edition (bonus tracks)
No.	Title	Writer(s)	Length
14.	"Our Love" (Krystal Klear remix)	Summer; Moroder	5:04
15.	"MacArthur Park" (Laidback Luke remix) (instrumental version)	Webb	5:40
16.	"Bad Girls" (Boys Noize club mix)	Summer; Sudano; Hokenson; Esposito	5:44
17.	"Sunset People" (Hot Chip re-edit)	Bellotte; Faltermeyer; Forsey	10:55
Total length:			27:23

== Charts ==
Chart performance for Love to Love You Donna
Chart (2013)	Peak position
US Billboard 200	97
US Top Dance Albums (Billboard)	2
US Top R&B/Hip-Hop Albums (Billboard)	20
US Top R&B Albums (Billboard)	11
