= Whenever There Is Love =

Single by Donna Summer

from the album Original Motion Picture Soundtrack: Daylight
- B-side: "Whenever There Is Love (Instrumental)"
- Released: November 12, 1996
- Recorded: 1996
- Genre: Pop, R&B, soul
- Length: 4:34
- Label: Universal Music
- Songwriter(s): Bruce Roberts, Sam Roman
- Producer(s): David Foster, Bruce Roberts

Donna Summer singles chronology
"I Feel Love (1995 Remix)" (1995)	"Whenever There Is Love" (1996)	"I Will Go with You (Con te partirò)" (1999)

"Whenever There Is Love" is a song written by American singer and songwriter Bruce Roberts and Edgar Bronfman Jr. (as Sam Roman) for the 1996 disaster film Daylight starring Sylvester Stallone.

The song was recorded as a duet by Roberts and singer Donna Summer. It was produced by Roberts and David Foster. It was released on November 12, 1996, by Universal Music as a single from the film's soundtrack album. The dance remixes were done by Junior Vasquez. The song peaked outside the Billboard Hot 100 chart (#109).

The song was credited to writer "Sam Roman" on its release, but it was soon revealed that "Roman" was actually a pseudonym for Edgar Bronfman Jr., chairman of Seagram, which owned MCA Inc., parent company of Universal Pictures, who produced and released the film.

== Single track listings ==
All tracks written by Bruce Roberts and Edgar Bronfman Jr. (as Sam Roman)

=== US CD single ===
1. (Album Version) - 4:30
2. (Instrumental) - 4:30

=== US remix 12" & Maxi-Promo CD Single ===
1. (Club Mix) - 9:47
2. (Club Dub) - 7:49
3. (Riff Dub) - 4:56
4. (Tribal Beats) - 4:01
5. (Instrumental) - 5:08
6. (7" Edit) - 4:06

=== German CD single ===
1. (Album Version) - 4:30
2. (Instrumental) - 4:30
3. (Junior Vasquez Club Mix) - 9:47

=== Spanish CD single ===
1. (Album Version) - 4:30
2. El Verdadero Amor (Spanish Version) - 4:30

French Version : Tant qu'il y aura l'amour ( French Lyrics by Lara Fabian )

- All remixes by Junior Vasquez
