= Can't We Just Sit Down (And Talk It Over) =

Single by Donna Summer

from the album I Remember Yesterday
- B-side: "I Feel Love"
- Released: May 1, 1977
- Genre: R&B
- Length: 4:25
- Label: Casablanca
- Songwriter: Tony Macaulay
- Producers: Giorgio Moroder; Pete Bellotte

Donna Summer singles chronology
"Winter Melody" (1977)	"Can't We Just Sit Down (And Talk It Over)" (1977)	"I Feel Love" (1977)

"Can't We Just Sit Down (And Talk It Over)" is a song by Tony Macaulay made famous by American singer Donna Summer, appearing on her album I Remember Yesterday (1977). Summer's version of the song is an R&B ballad, and was released as a single in certain countries in 1977. However, the disco B-side, "I Feel Love" caused such a stir that it was changed to the A-side – it became a landmark song in electronic dance music. "Can't We Just Sit Down (And Talk It Over)" rose to #20 on the R&B chart, the first time one of Summer's singles had done so since "Love to Love You Baby" (1975).

Record World said that "Summer demonstrates an impressive versatility with this slow, melodic ballad, sans erotic sound effects, that showcases a good, soulful singing voice."

Also in 1977, American soul singer Bill Brandon recorded a version of the song for his self-titled album, released on Prelude Records. David Soul recorded the song for his 1977 album Playing to an Audience of One. The following year, British singer Linda Lewis recorded the song for release as a 45 rpm single.

== Weekly charts ==
Chart (1977)	Peak position
US Hot R&B/Hip-Hop Songs (Billboard)	20
