= I Remember Yesterday (song) =

- German single picture sleeve (also used for the Dutch release with a different titling layout)

Single by Donna Summer

from the album I Remember Yesterday
- B-side: "Spring Affair" (UK); "I Remember Yesterday (Part 2)" (The Netherlands)
- Released: September 4, 1977
- Genre: Disco
- Length: 4:45
- Label: Casablanca (U.S.); GTO (UK); Various labels (rest of world)
- Songwriters: Donna Summer, Giorgio Moroder, Pete Bellotte
- Producers: Giorgio Moroder, Pete Bellotte

Donna Summer singles chronology
"Down Deep Inside (Theme From "The Deep")" (1977)	"I Remember Yesterday" (1977)	"Love's Unkind" (1977)

"I Remember Yesterday" is a song by American singer and songwriter Donna Summer released from her successful 1977 album I Remember Yesterday. Upon its release as a single it became a hit in Europe, reaching #14 on the UK Singles Chart and #20 in the Netherlands. The album also contained a reprise of the track (which in some nations was found on the B-side of the 7" single).

A Lithuanian rendering entitled "Aš Prisimenu Vakarykščią Dieną" was recorded in 1982 by Janina Miščiukaitė (lt). In 2018, the song was included in the Broadway musical Summer: The Donna Summer Musical.

== Weekly charts ==
Chart performance for "I Remember Yesterday"
Chart (1977)	Peak position
Austria (Ö3 Austria Top 40)	24
Belgium (Ultratop 50 Wallonia)	15
France (SNEP)	11
Italy (Musica e dischi)	10
Netherlands (Dutch Top 40)	24
Netherlands (Single Top 100)	20
UK Singles (Official Charts)	14
US Dance Club Songs (Billboard)	1

== Sales ==
Sales for I Remember Yesterday
Region	Sales
United Kingdom	200,000

== See also ==
- List of National Disco Action number ones of 1977
