= I Feel Love =

1977 single by Donna Summer

- Side A of 1977 US reissue

Single by Donna Summer

from the album I Remember Yesterday
- B-side: "Can't We Just Sit Down (And Talk It Over)"
- Released: July 2, 1977
- Recorded: 1976
- Studio: Musicland (Munich, West Germany)
- Genre: Synth-pop; Eurodisco; dance
- Length: 5:56 (album version); 3:46 (US promotional 7-inch version); 8:16 (12-inch version)
- Label: Casablanca
- Composers: Donna Summer; Giorgio Moroder; Pete Bellotte
- Lyricist: Pete Bellotte
- Producers: Giorgio Moroder; Pete Bellotte

Donna Summer singles chronology
"Can't We Just Sit Down (And Talk It Over)" (1977)	"I Feel Love" (1977)	"Shut Out" (1977)

Music video
- "I Feel Love" on YouTube

"I Feel Love" is a song by the American singer-songwriter Donna Summer. Produced and co-written by Giorgio Moroder and Pete Bellotte, it was recorded for Summer's fifth studio album, I Remember Yesterday (1977). The album concept was to have each track evoke a different musical decade; for "I Feel Love", the team aimed to create a futuristic mood, employing a Moog synthesizer.

"I Feel Love" was released as the B-side to the single "Can't We Just Sit Down (And Talk It Over)", which reached number 20 on the US Billboard R&B chart. Two months later, the single was reissued with the sides reversed. "I Feel Love" reached number one in countries including Australia, Austria, Belgium, the Netherlands and on the UK Singles Chart. It reached number three in West Germany and number six on the US Billboard Hot 100.

"I Feel Love" became popular during the disco era, influencing acts such as David Bowie, Brian Eno, Kylie Minogue, the Human League and Blondie. The Financial Times named it one of the most influential records, laying the foundations for electronic dance music. In 2011, the Library of Congress added it to the National Recording Registry as "culturally, historically, or aesthetically important". It has been covered by acts including Bronski Beat, Messiah and Sam Smith, while Beyoncé sampled it on her song "Summer Renaissance" from the 2022 album Renaissance.

== Recording ==
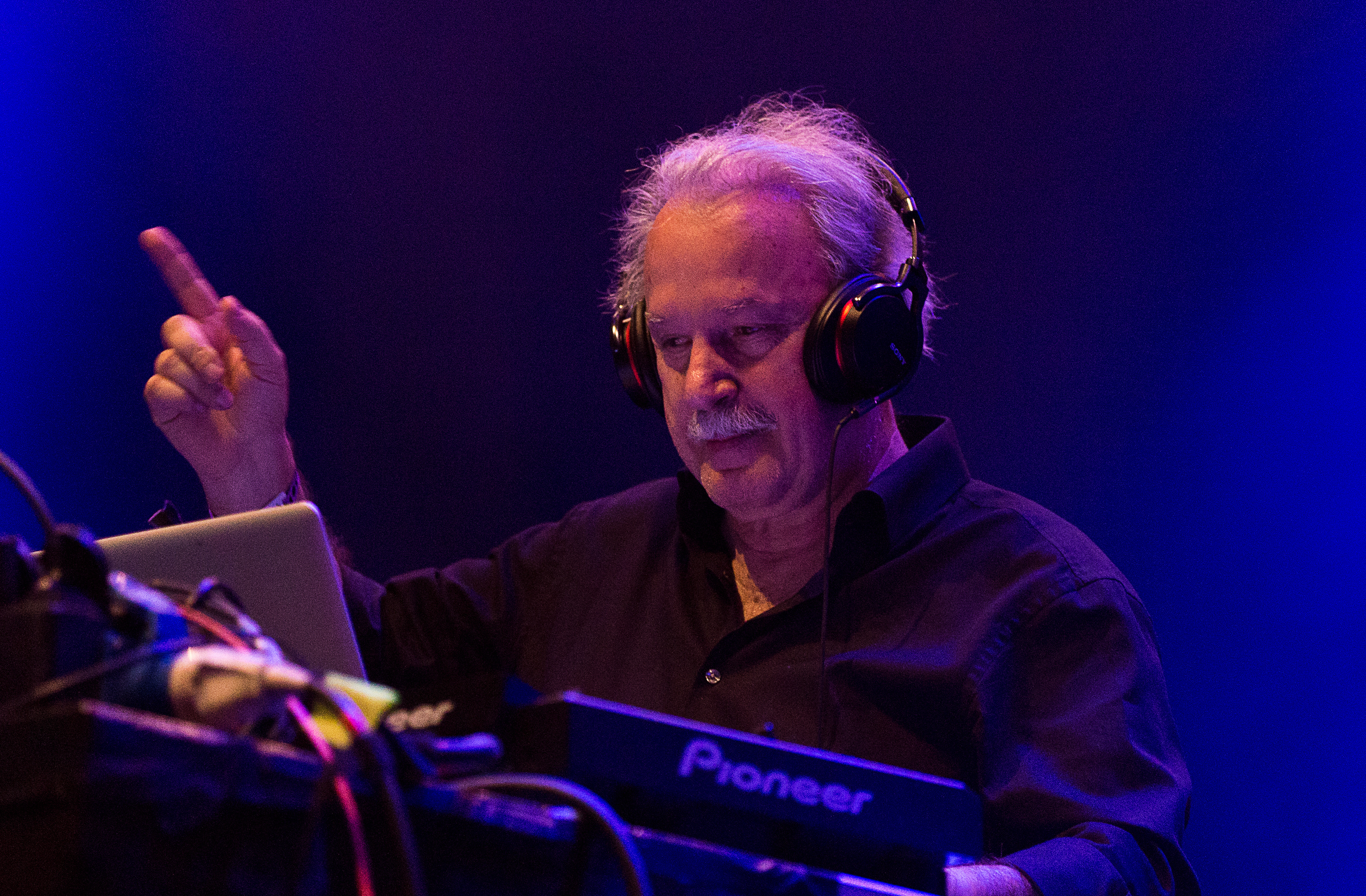
Giorgio Moroder in 2015

In 1970s Munich, Musicland Studios, led by the producers Giorgio Moroder and Pete Bellotte, had produced a number of disco hits, including Donna Summer's 1975 single "Love to Love You Baby". Summer had moved from the US to Munich to perform in the musical Hair, and had become a successful session vocalist. Moroder described her as "an incredibly talented singer, who could improvise but was also very disciplined".

For Summer's fifth album, I Remember Yesterday (1977), the production team wanted each track to evoke a different musical decade, such as '40s swing, '60s girl groups, and '70s funk and disco. For the final track, "I Feel Love", the team wanted to create a futuristic mood. Whereas most disco recordings had been backed by orchestras, the team produced "I Feel Love" with a Moog synthesizer borrowed from the classical composer Eberhard Schoener, aided by Schoener's assistant, Robby Wedel. Wedel demonstrated how to synchronize the elements using a click track, a feat Moroder described as "a revelation". Wedel's help with the technically complex synthesizer proved essential and Moroder described him as the "unsung hero" of the project.

"I Feel Love" was recorded on a 16-track tape recorder, with the various parts programmed on a sequencer. As the Moog went out of tune quickly, it had to be recorded in bursts of 20 or 30 seconds before being retuned. To create the hi-hat sound, the team took white noise generated by the Moog and processed it with an envelope. As the Moog could not create a satisfactory kick drum sound, the kick was played on a drum kit by the drummer Keith Forsey. Aside from the vocals, the kick is the only element not played by a machine.

The lyrics were written by Bellotte. Summer recorded her vocal in one take. In contrast to the deeper chest voice of most disco vocals, Summer sang in head voice.

== Composition ==
"I Feel Love" by Donna Summer

"I Feel Love" was the first song to combine repetitive synthesizer loops with a continuous four-on-the-floor bass drum and an off-beat hi-hat, which became a main feature of techno and house music ten years later.

Unusually for a disco track of the era, Moroder composed the backing track and bassline before the melody. He introduced variety by altering the key at regular intervals and layering Summer's vocals. Each note of the bassline is doubled by a delay effect. The unmodified bassline plays through the left channel and the delayed repetition through the right, creating a flickering, strobe-like effect.

"I Feel Love" is in the key of C major, with electronic dance flavor, and choruses and interludes. The album version has a length of 5:53. It was extended to 8:15 for release as a 12-inch maxi-single, and is included on the 1987 compilation The Dance Collection: A Compilation of Twelve Inch Singles.

The song was edited to 3:45 on the 7-inch format, the fade-in opening sound reaching maximum volume sooner and fades out before the third verse and final choruses. This version has been included on a large number of greatest hits packages and other compilations issued by PolyGram, Mercury Records, Universal Music and others, such as 1994's Endless Summer: Greatest Hits and 2003's The Journey: The Very Best of Donna Summer. A new edit of 3:20 was released on Donna Summer's first compilation album On the Radio: Greatest Hits Volumes I & II in 1979.

== Critical reception ==
According to the singer David Bowie, during the recording of his Berlin Trilogy, his collaborator Brian Eno "came running in" and told him he had heard "the sound of the future". According to Bowie, Eno accurately predicted that "I Feel Love" would change the sound of club music for the next 15 years.

Record World said the song "establishes a mood first, then builds on it" and praised the "captivating" synthesizer. The critic Vince Aletti wrote that "the pace is fierce and utterly gripping with the synthesizer effects particularly aggressive and emotionally charged". He predicted that the track "should easily equal if not surpass" the success of "Love to Love You Baby" in the clubs.

Robert Moog, the creator of the Moog synthesizer, was critical, saying:

Warm, lyrical vocals but essentially it sounded like [Summer] was fighting the sequencer. When the sequencer stopped, I felt that I could hear the audience sort of coming alive and breathing a sigh of relief ... When [the song] is played live, what does [the band] do? The audience expects a musician to be doing something and if he's not doing as much as they expect, it's more showbiz than music.

== Sales ==
"I Feel Love" peaked at number six on the US Billboard Hot 100 chart the week of November 12, 1977. It reached number nine on the Soul Singles Chart in October 1977. Its 1995 remix peaked at number nine on the Billboard Hot Dance Club Play chart.

In the United Kingdom, "I Feel Love" peaked at the top of the UK Singles Chart in July 1977, a position it maintained for four weeks. The 1982 and 1995 remixes of the song peaked at number 21 and number eight on the UK Singles Chart respectively, and sales of these physical singles totaled 956,400. According to the Official Charts Company, together with digital sales, "I Feel Love" has sold 1.07 million copies in the United Kingdom as of June 2013, making it Britain's 103rd best-selling single of all time.

Elsewhere, "I Feel Love" also topped the charts in Australia, Austria, Belgium, France, Italy and the Netherlands, and peaked within the top ten of the charts in Canada, West Germany, New Zealand, Norway, the Irish Singles Chart, South Africa, Sweden and Switzerland.

== Legacy ==
In a 2017 feature on the song's 40th anniversary for Pitchfork, Simon Reynolds wrote that "I Feel Love" had a significant impact on all genres for the next decade, including rock-leaning genres such as post-punk and new wave, and subsequent sub-genres of the electronic dance music style the song had pioneered, including Hi-NRG, Italo disco, house, techno, and trance. He wrote: "If any one song can be pinpointed as where the 1980s began, it's 'I Feel Love'."

In 1996, Mixmag named "I Feel Love" the 12th-greatest dance single, writing: "Whenever, however you hear this tune, it's guaranteed to make you smile, shut your eyes and trance out. The first electronic disco masterpiece, disco diva Donna and Moroder's finest, trippiest moment." In 2013, Mixmag named "I Feel Love" the 19th-greatest dance track. In 2006, Slant named it the greatest dance song, writing:

No longer would synthesizers remain the intellectual property of prog-classical geeks. And, separated from its LP context and taken as a Top 10 single, it didn't just suggest the future, it was the future. Cooing ascending couplets of an almost banal ecstasy, Summer's breathy vocals still dwelled in the stratosphere of her own manufactured sensation.

In 2011, The Guardian's Richard Vine ranked the release of "I Feel Love" as one of 50 key events in the history of dance music, writing that it was "one of the first [songs] to fully utilise the potential of electronics, replacing lush disco orchestration with the hypnotic precision of machines". In 2015, Time Out named it the 12th-best "party song", writing: "Sometimes a song comes along that's so innovative that it changes the shape of the musical landscape for decades, whilst also getting you to shake yo bootay. This timeless, Giorgio Moroder–produced disco anthem from 1977 did exactly that, becoming the first purely electronic jam to make it big and pretty much inventing dance music in the process." In 2023, Pride Life Global ranked it as one of the best gay anthems. In 2022, Rolling Stone ranked "I Feel Love" No. 1 in their list of the "200 Greatest Dance Songs of All Time" and in 2024, they ranked the song No. 52 in their "500 Greatest Songs of All Time" list. In 2025, Billboard magazine ranked "I Feel Love" No. 1 in their "The 100 Best Dance Songs of All Time" list and No. 13 in their "The 100 Greatest LGBTQ+ Anthems of All Time" list.

=== Accolades ===
Year	Publisher	Country	Accolade	Rank
1996	Mixmag	United Kingdom	"The 100 Best Dance Singles of All Time"	12
2000	VH1	United States	"100 Greatest Dance Songs"	76
2006	Slant Magazine	United States	"100 Greatest Dance Songs"	1
2011	The Guardian	United Kingdom	"A History of Modern Music: Dance"	*
2012	Rolling Stone	United States	"The Best Disco Songs of All Time"	3
2013	Mixmag	United Kingdom	"50 Greatest Dance Tracks of All Time"	19
2015	Time Out	United Kingdom	"The 100 Best Party Songs"	12
2019	NME	United Kingdom	"The 20 Best Disco Songs of All Time"	*
2020	Slant Magazine	United States	"The 100 Best Dance Songs of All Time"	1
2022	Rolling Stone	United States	"200 Greatest Dance Songs of All Time"	1
2023	Pride Life Global	United Kingdom	"Get Your Pride On! 20 Anthems to Help You Live the Dream"	*
2024	Rolling Stone	United States	"500 Greatest Songs of All Time"	52
2024	Forbes	United States	"The 30 Greatest Disco Songs of All Time"	22
2025	Billboard	United States	"The 100 Best Dance Songs of All Time"	1
2025	Billboard	United States	"The 100 Greatest LGBTQ+ Anthems of All Time"	13
2025	Classic Pop	United Kingdom	"Top 20 Giorgio Moroder Tracks"	1

(*) indicates the list is unordered.

== Track listings ==
US 7-inch Casablanca NB 884

1. "I Feel Love" – 5:53
2. "Can't We Just Sit Down (And Talk It Over)" – 4:25

US Promo 7-inch Casablanca NB 884 DJ

1. "I Feel Love" – 3:42
2. "I Feel Love" - 3:42

12-inch maxi Casablanca NBD-20104 [US]

1. "I Feel Love" – 8:15
2. "Love to Love You" – 16:50

Single-Side - 12-inch maxi Casablanca NBD-20104 [US]

1. "I Feel Love" – 8:15
2. "Theme from The Deep (Down, Deep Inside)" – 6:06

== Charts ==
=== Weekly charts ===
Chart (1977)	Peak position
Australia (Kent Music Report)	1
Austria (Ö3 Austria Top 40)	1
Belgium (Ultratop 50 Flanders)	1
Belgium (Ultratop 50 Wallonia)	2
Canada Top Singles (RPM)	4
Finland (Suomen virallinen lista)	11
France (SNEP)	35
Ireland (IRMA)	9
Italy (Musica e dischi)	1
Netherlands (Dutch Top 40)	1
Netherlands (Single Top 100)	1
New Zealand (Recorded Music NZ)	2
Norway (VG-lista)	8
Portugal (Musica & Som)	3
South Africa (Springbok Radio)	6
Spain (PROMUSICAE)	5
Sweden (Sverigetopplistan)	5
Switzerland (Schweizer Hitparade)	2
UK Singles (Official Charts)	1
US Billboard Hot 100	6
US Easy Listening (Billboard)	45
US Hot Soul Singles (Billboard)	9
US Cash Box Top 100	4
West Germany (GfK)	3

=== Year-end charts ===
Chart (1977)	Rank
Australia (Kent Music Report)	17
Austria (Ö3 Austria Top 40)	6
Belgium (Ultratop 50 Flanders)	6
Canada Top Singles (RPM)	55
Netherlands (Single Top 100)	18
New Zealand (Recorded Music NZ)	20
UK Singles (OCC)	7
US Cash Box Top 100	57
US Record World	23
West Germany (GfK)	27

== Certifications and sales ==
Region	Certification	Certified units/sales
Canada (Music Canada)	Platinum	150,000^{^}
France	—	150,000
Germany	—	300,000
Netherlands	—	100,000
New Zealand (RMNZ)	Gold	15,000^{‡}
United Kingdom (BPI)	Platinum	1,127,511
United States (RIAA)	Gold	1,000,000^{^}
^{^} Shipments figures based on certification alone.^{‡} Sales+streaming figures based on certification alone.

== Patrick Cowley remix ==
External audio
- "I Feel Love" (Patrick Cowley remix) on YouTube

American disco and Hi-NRG DJ Patrick Cowley created an extended remix of "I Feel Love" that became a popular underground classic. According to Mixmag, Cowley produced the mix using a vinyl copy of the original track rather than master tapes from Giorgio Moroder, and early versions circulated as an underground bootleg before being picked up by the Disconet remix service. Cowley used extended looping and overdubbed synthesizer effects to build the mix's hypnotic structure.

In mid-1980, Cowley's mix was released with the title "I Feel Love / I Feel Megalove" and subtitle "The Patrick Cowley MegaMix", but only on a limited vinyl pressing by the DJ-only subscription service Disconet. Since this pressing was not available to the general public for commercial sale, it became highly sought after by collectors. In 1982, it was released as a 12-inch single in the UK market by Casablanca, backed with an edited version. With this wider release, "I Feel Love" became a dance floor hit again, five years after its debut. A further-edited 7-inch single reached number 21 on the UK Singles Chart.

The Patrick Cowley mix was out of print until it was released on the bonus disc of the 2003 UK edition of The Journey: The Very Best of Donna Summer and the Ben Liebrand compilation album Grand 12-Inches. It also appears on the 2013 double disc I Feel Love: The Collection.

== 1995 and 2013 remixes ==
"I Feel Love (1995 Remix)"

Single by Donna Summer
- Released: August 28, 1995
- Genre: EDM; disco
- Length: 3:50
- Label: Casablanca; Manifesto; Mercury
- Composers: Donna Summer; Giorgio Moroder; Pete Bellotte
- Lyricist: Pete Bellotte
- Producer: Rollo & Sister Bliss

Donna Summer singles chronology
"Any Way at All" (1994)	"I Feel Love (1995 Remix)" (1995)	"Whenever There Is Love" (1996)

Audio
- "I Feel Love" (Rollo & Sister Bliss Monster Mix, 1995) on YouTube
- "I Feel Love" (Afrojack remix, 2013) on YouTube

Following 1993's The Donna Summer Anthology and 1994's Endless Summer: Greatest Hits, both released by PolyGram, "I Feel Love" was re-released on the PolyGram sublabel Manifesto in a newly remixed form as a single in 1995, including mixes by Masters at Work and production duo Rollo & Sister Bliss of UK electronic group Faithless – and also new vocals by Summer. The single became a UK number 8 hit, the second time the song had entered the Top 10, and the '95 Radio Edit was later included as a bonus track on PolyGram France's version of the Endless Summer compilation. The 1995 release also peaked at number 80 in Australia.

In 2013, a remix by Dutch DJ Afrojack was released together with remixes by other DJs of other Donna Summer songs on the remix album Love to Love You Donna.

=== Reception ===
James Masterton for Dotmusic complimented the 1995 remix for "not to tinker too much with the near-perfect realisation of the original", stating that it "still sounds as fresh as the day it was made". Alan Jones from Music Week felt the Masters At Work mixes of the track are "a trifle disappointing", while praising the Rollo & Sister Bliss remix. He explained, "The Rollo & Sister Bliss mix grows and grows, picking up vocals and some nifty and airy synth riffs along the way, building into a superb house stomper. A masterful piece of work, and one that will surely launch the new Manifesto label in style."

Rupert Howe from NME wrote, "La Summer needs no introduction, 'I Feel Love' being one of the greatest moments in the long and cocaine-riddled history of D-I-S-C-O — a sequins-and-spangles surge of Moroder-produced dancefloor dynamite with a chorus offering more uplift than a wardrobe full of wonderbras." The Record Mirror Dance Update stated, "The big guns are brought out to remix the classic disco anthem – Rollo and MAW". Helen Lamont from Smash Hits gave it a top score of five out of five, saying, "If you haven't heard 'I Feel Love' and you don't trust your aunt's taste, fear not. It's actually great! you can't help but love it, and it comes with the added bonus of watching your assorted relatives making a right fool of themselves in the living room. More power to the Queen of Disco."

=== Track listings ===
7-inch, UK (1995)

1. "I Feel Love" (Rollo & Sister Bliss Monster mix) – 3:50
2. "I Feel Love" (Summer 77 Re-EQ '95) – 5:51

CD single, Europe (1995)

1. "I Feel Love" (Rollo & Sister Bliss Monster mix) (radio edit) – 3:54
2. "I Feel Love" (Rollo & Sister Bliss Monster mix) – 6:30
3. "I Feel Love" (12-inch MAW mix) – 6:08

CD maxi, Canada (1995)

1. "I Feel Love" (Rollo & Sister Bliss Monster mix) – 6:31
2. "I Feel Love" (Masters at Work 86th St. mix) – 6:09
3. "I Feel Love" (Summer '77 Re-EQ '95) – 5:51
4. "Melody of Love (Wanna Be Loved)" (Junior Vasquez DMC remix) – 5:53

=== Charts ===
==== Weekly charts ====
Chart (1995)	Peak position
Australia (ARIA)	80
Belgium (Ultratop 50 Flanders)	38
Europe (Eurochart Hot 100)	15
Europe (European Dance Radio)	16
Finland (Suomen virallinen lista)	16
France (SNEP)	33
Israel (Israeli Singles Chart)	5
Netherlands (Dutch Top 40)	26
Netherlands (Single Top 100)	28
Scotland (OCC)	6
UK Singles (Official Charts)	8
UK Dance (Official Charts)	1
UK Airplay (Music Week)	12
UK Club Chart (Music Week)	1
UK Pop Tip Club Chart (Music Week)	1

==== Year-end charts ====
Chart (1995)	Position
UK Pop Tip Club Chart (Music Week)	16

== Bronski Beat version ==
External videos
- "I Feel Love / Johnny Remember Me" by the Bronski Beat featuring Marc Almond on YouTube

British synth-pop band Bronski Beat included a medley of "I Feel Love" with "Johnny Remember Me" on their gay-themed album The Age of Consent in 1984. The album charted in many markets and went platinum in the UK and Canada, with gay anthems "Smalltown Boy" and "Why?" hitting the top 10 in the UK, Australia, Germany, France, and several other European markets, as well as being popular on U.S. dancefloors. Jimmy Somerville left Bronski Beat in 1985 and went on to have success as lead singer of The Communards and as a solo artist.

The 1985 remix album Hundreds & Thousands included two new recordings with Somerville and remixes of The Age of Consent songs; it was released in 1985. The "I Feel Love" medley was extended with an intro of a cover of Summer's "Love to Love You Baby" and John Leyton's "Johnny Remember Me" with some new vocals from Marc Almond from Soft Cell; it was released as a single that hit No. 3 in the UK.

== Messiah version ==
"I Feel Love"

Single by Messiah

from the album 21st Century Jesus
- Released: 1992
- Studio: Kickin Studios; Moody Studios, London
- Genre: Breakbeat hardcore; techno
- Length: 4:11
- Label: Kickin (UK); WHTE LBLS; American Recordings; Warner Bros. Records; (US)
- Composers: Donna Summer; Giorgio Moroder; Pete Bellotte
- Lyricist: Pete Bellotte
- Producers: Messiah; Ralph P. Ruppert

Messiah singles chronology
"There Is No Law" (1992)	"I Feel Love" (1992)	"Thunderdome" (1993)

English electronic duo Messiah released its version of "I Feel Love" in 1992, featuring singer Precious Wilson on vocals. This version was a top-20 hit, peaking at No. 19 on the UK Singles Chart. In the US, it was released as a single in 1994 and reached No. 15 on the US Billboard Dance Club Songs chart in early 1995, spending a total of 10 weeks on the chart.

=== Critical reception ===
Larry Flick from Billboard magazine wrote, "Import-savvy spinners have been aware of this jumpy, trance-induced cover of Donna Summer's timeless disco hit for several seconds now. Given the influence the original '70s-era recording has had on a generation of rave rebels, it is hard to believe that no one has mustered the courage to take it on sooner. Messiah handles the track with obvious reverence, though it injects a frenzied energy that is instantly infectious. Do not miss Steveo's nifty new remix." Jonathan Bernstein from Spin noted that it features "one-time Eurodiva" Precious Wilson, "who fights to be heard in a particularly bruising rendition" of "I Feel Love".

=== Track listings ===
- UK 12-inch

A. "I Feel Love" – 4:11
B1. "The Future Is Ours" – 3:45
B2. "I Feel Love (Voxless)" – 4:03

- US 12-inch maxi

A1. "I Feel Love" (Centurion Mix)
A2. "I Feel Love" (Journey of Love)
A3. "I Feel Love" (Sellout Pussy Radio Mix)
B1. "I Feel Love" (I Feel Dub)
B2. "I Feel Love" (Kiss My Beat and Move)
B3. "I Feel Love" (American Version)

=== Charts ===
Chart performance for "I Feel Love" by Messiah
Chart (1992)	Peak position
Australia (ARIA)	66
UK Singles (OCC)	19
UK Dance (Music Week)	2
UK Club Chart (Music Week)	16
US Dance Club Songs (Billboard)	15

== Vanessa-Mae version ==
External videos
- "I Feel Love" by Vanessa-Mae on YouTube

Singaporean-born British singer-violinist Vanessa-Mae released a cover of "I Feel Love" in December 1997. It peaked at number 41 on the UK Singles Chart, and spent two weeks on the chart. The song was the second single from Vanessa-Mae's 1997 album Storm.

=== Track listings ===
CD1 (CDEM503)

1. "I Feel Love" (Single Version) - 4.23
2. "Storm" (Single Version) - 3.48
3. "Classical Gas" (Stradosphere Mix) - 8.15

CD2 (CDEMS503)

1. "I Feel Love" (Single Version) - 4.23
2. "I Feel Love" (Klubbheads vs Rollercoaster Mix) - 8.29
3. "I Feel Love" (D-Bop Saturday Nite Mix) - 8.47

== Sam Smith version ==
"I Feel Love"

Single by Sam Smith
- Released: November 1, 2019
- Genre: Pop; disco; synth-pop
- Length: 4:14
- Label: Capitol UK
- Composers: Donna Summer; Giorgio Moroder; Pete Bellotte
- Lyricist: Pete Bellotte
- Producer: Guy Lawrence

Sam Smith singles chronology
"How Do You Sleep?" (2019)	"I Feel Love" (2019)	"To Die For" (2020)

Videos
- "I Feel Love" (visualizer) by Sam Smith on YouTube
- "I Feel Love" (lyric video) by Sam Smith on YouTube

English singer Sam Smith released a cover of "I Feel Love" on November 1, 2019. Smith described it as a queer anthem and the "highest song" they had ever sung. The song was planned for inclusion on Smith's planned third studio album, To Die For, but was removed after Smith overhauled their album concept.

=== Track listing ===
Digital download / streaming

1. "I Feel Love" – 4:14

12-inch picture disc

1. "I Feel Love"
2. "I Feel Love" (Extended)

=== Charts ===
==== Weekly charts ====
Chart (2019–2020)	Peak position
Belgium (Ultratip Bubbling Under Flanders)	19
Belgium Dance (Ultratop Flanders)	14
Belgium Dance (Ultratop Wallonia)	49
Euro Digital Song Sales (Billboard)	11
Hungary (Single Top 40)	40
Ireland (IRMA)	78
Mexico Airplay (Billboard)	5
New Zealand Hot Singles (RMNZ)	22
Scottish Singles Sales (Official Charts)	24
UK Singles (Official Charts)	76
US Dance Club Songs (Billboard)	1
US Digital Song Sales (Billboard)	14
US Hot Dance/Electronic Songs (Billboard)	8

==== Year-end charts ====
Chart (2020)	Position
US Hot Dance/Electronic Songs (Billboard)	34

=== Release history ===
Region	Date	Format	Label	Ref.
Various	November 1, 2019	Digital download; streaming	Capitol	
United Kingdom	November 16, 2019	Adult contemporary radio	Capitol	
Various	August 29, 2020	12-inch	Capitol	

== See also ==
- List of Billboard number-one dance songs of 2020
