= The Deep (1977 film) =

1977 adventure film by Peter Yates

- Theatrical release poster
- Directed by: Peter Yates
- Screenplay by: Peter Benchley; Tracy Keenan Wynn
- Based on: The Deep by Peter Benchley
- Produced by: Peter Guber
- Starring: Robert Shaw; Jacqueline Bisset; Nick Nolte; Louis Gossett; Eli Wallach
- Cinematography: Christopher Challis
- Edited by: David Berlatsky
- Music by: John Barry
- Production companies: Casablanca FilmWorks; EMI Films
- Distributed by: Columbia Pictures (US); Columbia–EMI–Warner Distributors (UK)
- Release dates: 17 June 1977 (United States); 23 September 1977 (United Kingdom)
- Running time: 124 minutes
- Countries: United States; United Kingdom
- Language: English
- Budget: $8.5–9 million
- Box office: $100 million

The Deep is a 1977 adventure film based on Peter Benchley's 1976 novel of the same name. It was directed by Peter Yates and stars Robert Shaw, Jacqueline Bisset, and Nick Nolte.

== Plot ==
While scuba diving near shipwrecks off Bermuda, vacationing couple David Sanders and Gail Berke recover small artifacts, including a glass ampoule with amber-coloured liquid and a gold medallion bearing a woman's image and the letters "S.C.O.P.N." (meaning "Santa Clara, ora pro nobis", or "Saint Clara, pray for us") and a date, 1714. An unknown sea creature suddenly grabs Gail's wood baton as she probes the wreck's crevices. Panicked, she gets loose from the strap while the baton's end is left shredded. Sanders and Berke seek advice from historian and treasure hunter Romer Treece on the medallion's origin. He identifies the item as Spanish as he palms the ampoule, taking an interest in the couple.

The dive-shop clerk notices the ampoule, which in turn attracts the attention of Henri "Cloche" Bondurant, a local drug kingpin for whom the clerk works. When Cloche unsuccessfully tries to buy the ampoule, he begins terrorizing the couple. The ampoule contains medicinal morphine from the Goliath, a ship that sank during World War II with a cargo of munitions and medical supplies. The Goliath is off-limits to divers due to the still-live explosives. Treece concludes that a recent storm has exposed the morphine and unearthed a much older wreck containing Spanish treasure that is beneath Goliath.

Treece makes a deal with Cloche to retrieve the ampoules for $1 million, which Cloche can illegally resell for over $3 million, while Treece secretly searches for the treasure. Cloche gives him three days to recover the morphine. Sanders, Berke and Treece make several dives to the wrecks, recovering thousands of ampoules from Goliath and several additional artifacts from the Spanish wreck. They also encounter a huge moray eel, which lives inside the vessel, and was what previously attacked Berke. Adam Coffin, the only survivor from Goliath, joins the venture, but his loyalty shifts when he feels slighted by Treece. When Cloche's men arrive and dump bait into the water to attract sharks, Coffin tells Treece he probably fell asleep without noticing they were in trouble.

Through research in Treece's library, the trio reconstructs the lost treasure ship's history and locates a list of valuable items, including a gold pinecone filled with pearls with the letters "EF" engraved on it. The initials identify Elisabeth Farnese, a noblewoman for whom they were made by the King of Spain. Sanders is determined to locate at least one item on the list to establish provenance, as without it, the treasure has less value. Treece plans to destroy the Goliath to prevent Cloche from obtaining the morphine. Cloche attempts to thwart them and recover the morphine himself. Cloche's henchman murders Treece's long-time friend Kevin. Adam betrays Treece and is killed by triggering Treece's booby trap in the lighthouse tower when he tries to steal the recovered morphine stashed there. During the final dive, Cloche is killed by the giant eel, while his henchman Slake is speared by Gail on the surface, and his other henchman Ronald is drowned by David. The Goliath is destroyed in the explosion that Treece ignites. Treece recovers a gold dragon necklace that provides the treasure's needed provenance.

== Cast ==
- Robert Shaw as Romer Treece
- Jacqueline Bisset as Gail Berke
- Nick Nolte as David Sanders
- Louis Gossett Jr. as Henri 'Cloche' Bondurant
- Eli Wallach as Adam Coffin
- Dick Anthony Williams as Slake
- Earl Maynard as Ronald
- Bob Minor as Wiley
- Robert Tessier as Kevin
- Colin Shaw (Robert's real-life son) as young Romer Treece

Two actors from the Jaws films (which were also based on a novel by Peter Benchley) appeared in this film. Robert Shaw previously played shark hunter Quint in Jaws in 1975, while Louis Gossett Jr. subsequently played SeaWorld park owner Calvin Bouchard in Jaws 3 in 1983. Shaw's character Romer Treece was largely inspired by Bermudian explorer Teddy Tucker, who makes a cameo appearance as the harbor master early in The Deep. Tucker's own dive boat The Brigadier was dressed to play Treece's boat Corsair, and on that vessel, Peter Benchley partly wrote Jaws.

== Production ==
The original concept was developed from the story of a Bermuda shipwreck, the Constellation, which sank in 1942, carrying ampoules of morphine among other war cargos, such as concrete mix and pharmaceuticals. Constellation sank after possibly striking the wreckage of American Civil War blockade runner Montana, which Peter Benchley described as having sunk one on top of the other.

After the success of Jaws, Columbia Pictures purchased the rights to Benchley's next novel before its publication in 1976, hiring him to write a screen adaptation. After Peter Guber left his job at Columbia and signed a three-year distribution deal between Columbia and his new company Casablanca FilmWorks, he received The Deep as his company's first project. Benchley's screenplay was rewritten by Tracy Keenan Wynn and Tom Mankiewicz, while Robert Shaw and Nick Nolte rewrote much of their dialogue.

The movie was partly financed by Britain's EMI Films.

Filming began in July 1976 with open-water diving sequences off Black Rock Point, Salt Island, near Peter Island, the location of the real shipwreck of the RMS Rhone in the British Virgin Islands. By August 1976 the production was filming land sequences on location in Bermuda. Other scenes were filmed at the Great Barrier Reef in Australia. Robert Shaw was paid $650,000 plus a percentage of the profits; Bisset and Nolte were paid $200,000 each. After Shaw suggested that the film would be more realistic if the filming took place underwater, the entire cast and crew were taught how to scuba dive and filmed their scenes underwater. Although some scenes were shot in the ocean at depths of 80 feet, many of them were ultimately filmed in underwater sets to eliminate the need for decompression. The film originally had an alternate opening depicting the sinking of the Goliath in 1943, with a cameo appearance by Benchley, but it was cut from the film.

The production was responsible for a number of technical firsts, including Al Giddings' Petermar camera system and the use of specially modified 5000-watt "Senior" luminaires to provide cinematic lighting underwater. The world's biggest underwater set was dug at the summit of a historic Bermuda hill formerly known as Hospital Island at Ireland Island South.

The film was marketed with a massive advertising campaign, with Columbia spending $1.3 million in television commercials and $1.5 million in print advertising. The film was marketed in Playboy and Penthouse magazines with a still of Bisset in a wet T-shirt, although plans to make a poster of this image were cancelled after Bisset threatened to sue. After the ABC Television Network released The Making of Star Wars, Columbia produced a similar one-hour primetime special called The Making of 'The Deep' , produced, written, and directed by Peter Lake and Chuck Workman on the CBS Television Network. Research data reported in The New York Times showed that the marketing of the film was so extensive that the average moviegoer viewing the film had already seen a full 15 minutes of it.

== Music ==
The film's score was composed and conducted by John Barry, who at the time was most famous for his work on the James Bond film series, and performed by the Hollywood Studio Symphony. In the same manner of a Bond film, Barry collaborated with a high-profile singer for the film's theme song. American singer Donna Summer teamed up with Barry for the film's signature song, titled "Down Deep Inside (Theme from the Deep)". Summer was a singer under contract to film production company, Casablanca Record and FilmWorks. The song was nominated for a Golden Globe Award and a hit on the U.S. Dance Chart, as well as a top-five singles hit in the UK, and a top-40 hit in the Netherlands.

=== Charts ===
Chart (1977)	Peak position
Australia (Kent Music Report)	63

== Reception ==
The Deep was released on June 17, 1977, and was well received by the public. For the first time in film history the audience saw the real underwater world filmed in Panavision. The film reportedly cost $8.5 million to market having assured promotional partners that by opening day over 200 million people would have read, seen or heard about The Deep more than 15 times. Upon its release, the film was noted for its opening scene of Jacqueline Bisset swimming underwater while wearing only a thin, white T-shirt and a black bikini bottom. A possibly opportunistic photo of Bisset in character taken underwater by the wreck of RMS Rhone was used to target the men's lifestyle market without her approval. Producer Peter Guber claimed this helped make the film a box office success, and said "That T-shirt made me a rich man!"

The Deep opened to $8,124,316 on 800 screens beating the opening weekend record set by Jaws, although it had opened on almost double the number of screens that Jaws had. It was the eighth highest-grossing film of 1977 in the United States and Canada with a gross of $47.3 million. Overseas, the film was Columbia's highest-grossing film and grossed over $100 million worldwide, although Guber complained in May 1978 that he had not received any profit participation.

Vincent Canby of The New York Times gave the film a negative review, stating that "The story, as well as Peter Yates's direction of it, is juvenile without being in any attractive way innocent, but the underwater sequences are nice enough, alternately beautiful and chilling. The shore-based melodrama is as badly staged as any I've seen since Don Schain's The Abductors (1972), which is to remember incompetence of stunning degree." Roger Ebert praised the film for its photography and presenting a romance in a new setting.

The Deep holds a 38% rating on Rotten Tomatoes based on 26 reviews. The consensus summarizes: "Narratively shallow, The Deep is a satisfyingly disposable thriller with commendable underwater photography."

=== Awards and nominations ===
Among the film's honors include nominations for an Academy Award and a Golden Globe Award:

Year	Award	Category	Recipient	Result
1977	Academy Awards	Best Sound	Walter Goss, Tom Beckert, Robin Gregory, Dick Alexander	Nominated
1977	Golden Globe Awards	Best Original Song	John Barry, Donna Summer	Nominated
1977	British Academy Film Awards	Best Cinematography	Christopher Challis	Nominated
1977	Photoplay Awards	Gold Medal for Favorite Movie	Jacqueline Bisset, Nick Nolte	Nominated

== Comic book adaptation ==
- Marvel Comics: The Deep (November 1977)
