= Love's Unkind =

- German picture sleeve

Single by Donna Summer

from the album I Remember Yesterday
- B-side: "Autumn Changes" (UK); "Black Lady" (Germany/The Netherlands)
- Released: November 29, 1977
- Genre: Rock; disco
- Length: 4:29
- Label: Casablanca (US); GTO (UK)
- Songwriters: Donna Summer; Giorgio Moroder; Pete Bellotte
- Producers: Giorgio Moroder; Pete Bellotte

Donna Summer singles chronology
"I Remember Yesterday" (1977)	"Love's Unkind" (1977)	"I Love You" (1977)

"Love's Unkind" is a song written and produced by Giorgio Moroder and Pete Bellotte, with lyrics and vocals by American singer and songwriter Donna Summer. It was recorded for the Donna Summer album, I Remember Yesterday (1977), which combined modern disco beats with sounds of previous decades. "Love's Unkind" was released as a single in Europe in November 1977, reaching number three on the UK Singles Chart, and number 32 in the Netherlands. It entered the Irish Charts on 5 January 1978, peaking at number two. Though never released as a single in the US, it topped the Billboard dance chart as part of the I Remember Yesterday album, as at that time entire albums could count as one entry on that particular chart. The lyrics are of high school crushes and love triangles.

== Weekly charts ==
Chart (1977–1978)	Peak position
Austria (Ö3 Austria Top 40)	18
Belgium (Ultratop 50 Flanders)	25
Ireland (IRMA)	2
Netherlands (Dutch Top 40)	32
Netherlands (Single Top 100)	28
UK Singles (OCC)	3
US Billboard Hot Dance Club Play	1
West Germany (GfK)	18

== Certifications and sales ==
Region	Certification	Certified units/sales
United Kingdom (BPI)	Gold	550,000

== Cover version ==
English actress Sophie Lawrence reached No. 21 on the UK Singles Chart and No. 20 in Luxembourg in 1991 with her cover of the song. It also peaked at No. 40 on the UK Airplay chart.
