= Down Deep Inside =

"Down Deep Inside (Theme From The Deep)"
- German vinyl picture sleeve

Single by Donna Summer

from the album The Deep soundtrack
- B-side: "Theme from The Deep (Instrumental)"
- Released: August 1977
- Genre: Disco
- Length: 4:23
- Label: Casablanca
- Songwriters: Donna Summer, John Barry
- Producer: John Barry

Donna Summer singles chronology
"Shut Out" (1977)	"Down Deep Inside (Theme From The Deep)" (1977)	"I Remember Yesterday" (1977)

"Down Deep Inside" is the theme song from the 1977 film The Deep. The film's score was written by British composer John Barry and the lyrics to the main theme were added by disco singer Donna Summer. The track was released as a single and became a hit in some European countries, including on the UK Singles Chart. The film soundtrack LP also contained a slower tempo version of the song, and an extended version of the original later appeared on a CD version of Summer's 1978 Live and More album. The song was nominated for a Golden Globe Award for Best Original Song at the 35th Golden Globe Awards.

== Chart performance ==
The song was a hit on the US Billboard dance chart, as well as a top-five hit on the UK Singles Chart and a top-ten hit in the Netherlands.

== Charts ==
Chart performance for "Down Deep Inside"
Chart (1977)	Peak position
Australia (Kent Music Report)	70
Belgium (Ultratop 50 Flanders)	4
Belgium (Ultratop 50 Wallonia)	8
Germany (GfK)	25
Italy (Musica e dischi)	17
Netherlands (Dutch Top 40)	6
Netherlands (Single Top 100)	5
UK Singles (Official Charts)	5
US Billboard Dance Music/Club Play Singles	3

== Certifications ==
Region	Certification	Certified units/sales
United Kingdom (BPI)	Silver	250,000^{^}
^{^} Shipments figures based on certification alone.
