= Giorgio Moroder discography =

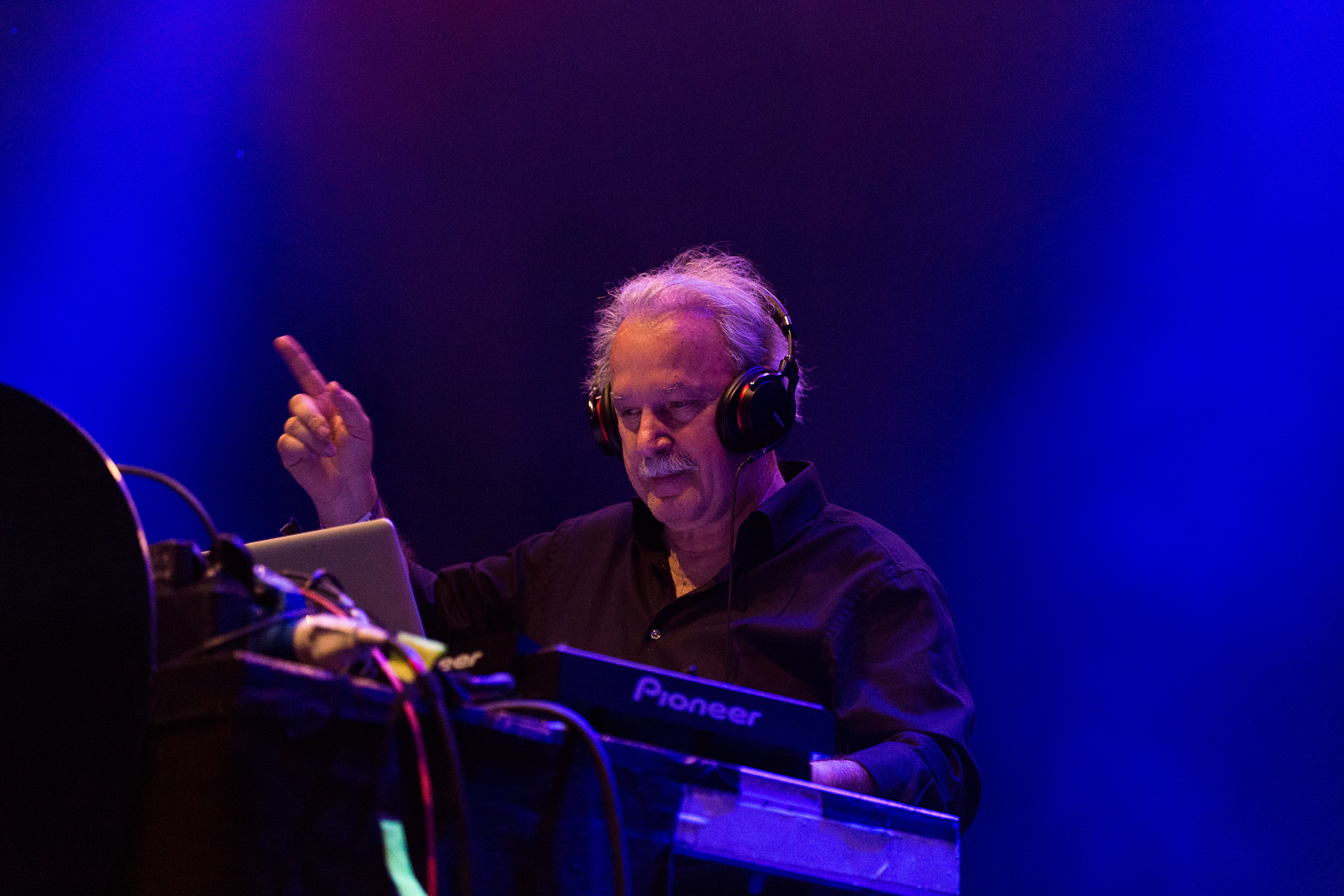
- Giorgio Moroder at Melt! Festival 2015.
- Studio albums: 16
- Soundtrack albums: 11
- Compilation albums: 3
- Singles: 41
- Music videos: 3

Giorgio Moroder produced thirteen studio albums and ten soundtracks, as well as numerous production credits. When in Munich in the 1970s, he started his own record label called Oasis Records, which several years later became a subdivision of Casablanca Records. He produced huge hits for Donna Summer during the late-1970s disco era, including "Bad Girls", "Last Dance", "Love to Love You Baby", "No More Tears (Enough Is Enough)", "Dim All the Lights", "MacArthur Park", "Hot Stuff", "On the Radio", and "I Feel Love", and is the founder of the former Musicland Studios in Munich, a recording studio used by many renowned artists including Electric Light Orchestra, Led Zeppelin, Queen and Elton John.

Moroder also produced a number of electronic disco hits for the Three Degrees, two albums for Sparks, and a handful of songs on Bonnie Tyler's album Bitterblue as well as her 1985 single "Here She Comes". Moroder also created a score of songs for performers including David Bowie, Kylie Minogue, Irene Cara, Janet Jackson, Madleen Kane, Melissa Manchester, Blondie, Japan, Sabrina Salerno and France Joli. He has stated that the work of which he is most proud is Berlin's "Take My Breath Away".

== Albums ==
=== Studio albums ===
List of studio albums, with selected chart positions
Title	Album details	Peak chart positions									
Title	Album details	ITA	AUS	BEL	GER	IRL	NL	SWI	UK	US	US Dance
That's Bubblegum – That's Giorgio	Released: 1969; Format: LP; Label: Hansa	—	—	—	—	—	—	—	—	—	—
Giorgio	Released: 1970; Format: LP; Label: Hansa	17	—	—	—	—	—	—	—	—	—
Son of My Father	Released: 1972; Format: LP; Label: Hansa	—	—	—	—	—	—	—	—	—	—
Giorgio's Music	Released: 1973; Format: LP; Label: Philips	—	—	—	—	—	—	—	—	—	—
Spinach 1 (with Michael Holm under name of Spinach)	Released: 1973; Format: LP; Label: Canyon	—	—	—	—	—	—	—	—	—	—
Einzelgänger	Released: September 11, 1975; Format: LP; Label: Oasis	—	—	—	—	—	—	—	—	—	—
Knights in White Satin	Released: April 13, 1976; Format: LP; Label: Oasis	23	43	—	—	—	—	—	—	—	—
From Here to Eternity	Released: July 22, 1977; Format: LP; Label: Oasis, Casablanca	2	68	—	—	—	—	—	—	130	—
Love's in You, Love's in Me (with Chris)	Released: June 23, 1978; Format: LP; Label: Oasis, Casablanca	24	—	—	—	—	—	—	—	—	—
E=MC²	Released: August 29, 1979; Format: LP; Label: Oasis, Casablanca	16	93	—	—	—	—	—	—	—	—
Solitary Men (with Joe Esposito)	Released: August 9, 1983; Format: LP; Label: Oasis	—	—	—	—	—	—	—	—	—	—
Innovisions	Released: February 9, 1985; Format: LP; Label: Oasis, Carrere	—	—	—	—	—	—	—	—	—	—
Philip Oakey & Giorgio Moroder (with Philip Oakey)	Released: July 19, 1985; Format: LP; Label: Virgin	—	—	—	—	—	—	—	52	—	—
To Be Number One (Giorgio Moroder Project)	Released: May 2, 1990; Format: LP; Label: Virgin	10	—	—	—	—	—	—	—	—	—
Forever Dancing	Released: March 12, 1992; Format: CD, digital download; Label: Virgin	—	—	—	—	—	—	—	—	—	—
Déjà Vu	Released: June 12, 2015; Format: CD, LP, digital download; Label: RCA	32	23	52	31	38	50	22	30	72	1
"—" denotes releases that did not chart or were not released in that territory.

=== Recorded as by Munich Machine ===
Title	Album details
Munich Machine	Released: 1977; Format: LP; Label: Oasis, Casablanca
A Whiter Shade of Pale (introducing Chris Bennett)	Released: 1978; Format: LP; Label: Oasis, Casablanca
Body Shine	Released: 1979; Format: LP, CD; Label: Oasis, Casablanca

=== Soundtrack albums ===
Title	Album details	Peak chart positions			
Title	Album details	AUS	GER	US	US Dance
Midnight Express	Released: October 6, 1978; Format: LP; Label: Casablanca	26	—	59	—
Battlestar Galactica	Released: December 11, 1978; Format: LP; Label: Casablanca	—	—	—	—
American Gigolo	Released: February 8, 1980; Format: LP; Label: Polydor	79	—	7	—
Foxes	Released: February 29, 1980; Format: LP; Label: Casablanca	—	—	—	—
Cat People	Released: April 2, 1982; Format: LP; Label: Backstreet, MCA	—	—	47	—
Flashdance	Released: April 15, 1983; Format: LP; Label: Casablanca	1	—	1	—
Scarface	Released: December 9, 1983; Format: LP; Label: MCA	—	—	—	—
D.C. Cab	Released: December 16, 1983; Format: LP; Label: MCA	—	—	—	—
The NeverEnding Story (with Klaus Doldinger)	Released: April 6, 1984; Format: LP; Label: EMI	22	17	10	—
Metropolis	Released: July 19, 1984; Format: LP; Label: EMI	69	50	110	—
Over the Top	Released: February 13, 1987; Format: LP; Label: CBS	—	—	—	
Mamba (Original Motion Picture Soundtrack)	Released: 1988; Format: CD, LP; Label: Ariola Records	—	—	—	—
Another Way (Original Motion Picture Soundtrack)	Released: 1988; Format: CD; Label: Sony	—	—	—	—
The NeverEnding Story II: The Next Chapter (with Robert Folk)	Released: October 12, 1990; Format: LP; Label: EMI	—	—	—	—
Tron RUN/r (with Raney Shockne)	Released: May 31, 2016; Format: digital download; Label: Sumthing Else Music Works	—	—	—	—
"—" denotes releases that did not chart or were not released in that territory.

=== Compilations ===
Title	Album details
From Here to Eternity... And Back	Released: May 2, 1985; Format: LP; Label: Casablanca
To Be Number One (L'Inno Dei Mondiali)	Released: July 14, 1990; Format: LP; Label: Virgin
16 Early Hits	Released: May 20, 1996; Format: CD, digital download; Label: Hansa
The Best of Giorgio Moroder	Released: April 3, 2001; Format: CD, digital download; Label: Virgin

== Singles ==
=== As lead artist ===
List of singles with selected chart positions, showing year released and album name
Title	Year	Peak chart positions										Album
Title	Year	ITA	BEL	FIN	FRA	GER	SPA	SWI	UK	US	US Dance	Album
"Cerca (Di Scordare)"	1965	—	—	—	—	—	—	—	—	—	—	Non-album singles
"Believe in Me"/ "Stop"	1966	—	—	—	—	—	—	—	—	—	—	Non-album singles
"Glaub An Mich"	1966	—	—	—	—	—	—	—	—	—	—	Non-album singles
"Bla, Bla Diddly"	1966	—	—	—	56	—	—	—	—	—	—	Non-album singles
"Lilly Belle"	1967	—	—	—	—	—	—	—	—	—	—	Non-album singles
"Cinnamon"	1968	—	—	—	—	—	—	—	—	—	—	Non-album singles
"Moody Trudy"	1968	—	17	—	7	31	—	—	—	—	—	That's Bubblegum – That's Giorgio
"Yummy, Yummy, Yummy"	1968	—	—	—	—	—	—	—	—	—	—	That's Bubblegum – That's Giorgio
"Looky, Looky"	1969	—	—	—	1	69	—	3	—	—	—	That's Bubblegum – That's Giorgio
"Mah Nà Mah Nà"	1969	—	—	—	—	—	—	—	—	—	—	Sweden: Heaven and Hell
"Monja"	1969	—	—	—	—	—	—	—	—	—	—	Non-album single
"Mony, Mony"	1970	—	—	—	—	—	—	—	—	—	—	Giorgio
"Arizona Man"	1970	—	—	—	6	—	—	—	—	—	—	Giorgio
"Underdog"	1971	—	—	—	—	22	—	—	—	—	—	Son of My Father
"I'm Free Now"	1971	—	—	—	—	—	—	—	—	—	—	Son of My Father
"London Traffic"	1971	—	—	—	—	—	—	—	—	—	—	Son of My Father
"Tu Sei Mio Padre"	1972	—	—	—	—	—	—	—	—	—	—	Son of My Father
"Son of My Father"	1972	—	—	—	27	47	—	—	—	46	—	Son of My Father
"Today's a Tomorrow (You Worried 'Bout Yesterday)"	1972	—	—	—	—	—	—	—	—	—	—	Son of My Father
"Take It, Shake It, Break My Heart"	1972	—	—	—	—	—	—	—	—	—	—	Son of My Father
"The Future Is Past"	1972	—	—	—	—	—	—	—	—	—	—	Non-album single
"Lonely Lovers' Symphony"	1973	—	—	15	—	—	—	—	—	—	—	Giorgio's Music
"Heaven Helps the Man (Who Helps Himself)"	1973	—	—	—	—	—	—	—	—	—	—	Giorgio's Music
"Hilf Dir Selbst"	1973	—	—	—	—	—	—	—	—	—	—	Giorgio's Music
"Marrakesh"	1974	—	—	—	—	—	—	—	—	—	—	Giorgio's Music
"Lie, Lie, Lie"	1974	—	—	—	—	—	—	—	—	—	—	Non-album singles
"Born to Die" (featuring Common Cause)	1974	—	—	—	—	—	—	—	—	—	—	Non-album singles
"Bricks and Mortar"	1975	—	—	—	—	—	—	—	—	—	—	Non-album singles
"Knights in White Satin"	1976	10	—	—	65	—	—	—	—	—	14	Knights in White Satin
"I Wanna Funk with You Tonite"	1976	—	—	—	—	—	—	—	—	—	4	Knights in White Satin
"Let the Music Play"	1977	14	—	—	—	—	—	—	—	—	8	Knights in White Satin
"From Here to Eternity"	1977	6	14	—	73	29	—	—	16	—	2	From Here to Eternity
"Utopia – Me Giorgio"	1977	—	—	—	—	—	—	—	—	—	—	From Here to Eternity
"Love's in You, Love's in Me" (with Chris)	1978	—	—	—	—	—	—	—	—	—	—	Love's in You, Love's in Me
"Love Now, Hurt Later" (with Chris)	1978	—	—	—	—	—	—	—	—	—	—	Love's in You, Love's in Me
"Chase"	1978	18	—	—	—	44	—	75	46	33	31	Midnight Express
"(Theme From) Midnight Express" (with Chris)	1978	—	—	—	—	—	—	—	—	—	—	Midnight Express
"Baby Blue" / "E=MC²"	1979	—	—	—	—	—	—	—	—	—	4	E=MC²
"If You Weren't Afraid"	1979	—	—	—	—	—	—	—	—	—	4	E=MC²
"I Wanna Rock You"	1979	—	—	—	—	—	—	—	—	—	—	E=MC²
"What a Night"	1980	—	—	—	—	—	—	—	—	—	—	E=MC²
"Night Drive" / "The Apartment"	1980	—	—	—	—	—	—	—	—	—	—	American Gigolo
"Hollywood Dreams" / "Valley of the Dolls"	1980	—	—	—	—	—	—	—	—	—	—	Non-album single
"Lady, Lady" (with Joe Esposito)	1983	—	—	—	—	—	—	19	—	86	—	Solitary Men
"A Love Affair" (with Joe Esposito)	1983	—	—	—	94	—	—	—	—	—	—	Solitary Men
"Solitary Men" (with Joe Esposito)	1983	—	—	—	—	—	—	—	—	—	—	Solitary Men
"Together in Electric Dreams" (with Philip Oakey)	1984	—	—	—	—	—	—	—	3	—	20	Electric Dreams
"The Duel"	1984	—	—	—	—	—	—	—	—	—	—	Electric Dreams
"Now You're Mine" (with Helen Terry)	1984	—	—	—	—	—	—	—	—	—	—	Electric Dreams
"Reach Out" (with Paul Engemann)	1984	—	—	—	—	1	—	2	—	81	—	Innovisions
"American Dream" (with Paul Engemann)	1984	—	—	—	—	36	—	—	—	—	—	Innovisions
"Shannon's Eyes" (with Paul Engemann)	1985	—	—	—	—	—	—	—	—	—	—	Innovisions
"Good-Bye Bad Times" (with Philip Oakey)	1985	—	—	—	—	—	—	—	44	—	20	Philip Oakey & Giorgio Moroder
"Be My Lover Now" (with Philip Oakey)	1985	—	—	—	—	—	—	—	91	—	—	Philip Oakey & Giorgio Moroder
"To Be Number One" (featuring Paul Engemann)	1990	2	—	—	—	—	—	—	—	—	—	To Be Number One
"Carry On" (with Donna Summer)	1992	—	—	—	—	—	—	—	65	—	25	Forever Dancing
"Last Night" (with Gloria Gaynor)	2000	—	—	—	—	70	—	89	67	—	—	Non-album single
"74 Is the New 24"	2014	—	—	—	—	—	—	—	—	—	—	Déjà Vu
"Right Here, Right Now" (featuring Kylie Minogue)	2015	—	60	17	147	—	40	—	125	—	1	Déjà Vu
"Déjà Vu" (featuring Sia)	2015	—	—	—	182	—	—	—	194	—	1	Déjà Vu
"Tom's Diner" (featuring Britney Spears)	2015	—	—	—	146	—	—	—	—	—	38	Déjà Vu
"Good for Me" (featuring Karen Harding)	2016	—	—	—	—	—	—	—	—	—	—	TBA
"—" denotes releases that did not chart or were not released in that territory.

=== As featured artist ===
List of songs, showing year released and album name
Title	Year	Album
"Tony's Theme" (The Beat Mercenaries featuring Giorgio Moroder)	2014	Non-album single
"Midnight (Giorgio Moroder remix)" (Coldplay featuring Giorgio Moroder)	2014	Midnight
"One More Day" (Sistar featuring Giorgio Moroder)	2016	Non-album single

=== Promotional singles ===
List of songs, showing year released and album name
Title	Year	Album
"Take My Breath Away"	1999	Non-album singles
"On the Radio"	2000	Non-album singles
"I'm Yours"	2000	Non-album singles

== Other charted songs ==
List of songs with selected chart positions, showing year released and album name
Title	Year	Peak chart positions				Album
Title	Year	FRA	SPA	SWE	US Dance	Album
"Giorgio by Moroder" (Daft Punk featuring Giorgio Moroder)	2013	54	—	57	22	Random Access Memories
"Your Body" (Kylie Minogue and Fernando Garibay featuring Giorgio Moroder)	2015	174	42	—	—	Kylie and Garibay
"—" denotes releases that did not chart or were not released in that territory.
