= Harmony (Suzi Lane song) =

Single by Suzi Lane

from the album Ooh, La, La
- B-side: "Givin' It Up"
- Released: August 12, 1979
- Recorded: 1979
- Genre: Disco
- Length: 4:08 (7" version); 6:45 (12" version); 6:59 (Album version)
- Label: Elektra
- Songwriters: Giorgio Moroder, Pete Bellotte, Geoff Bastow
- Producer: Giorgio Moroder

Suzi Lane singles chronology
"Ooh, La, La" (1979)	"Harmony" (1979)

"Harmony" is a 1979 song by Suzi Lane from the album Ooh, La, La. The song was written by Giorgio Moroder, Pete Bellotte, and Geoff Bastow and produced by Moroder.

== Chart performance ==
Along with the track "Ooh, La, La", the song went to number one for one week on the Billboard disco/dance chart. "Harmony" failed to chart on either the Billboard Hot 100 or the R&B chart.
