= Ooh La La (Suzi Lane album) =

Ooh, La, La

Studio album by Suzi Lane
- Released: 1979
- Studio: Musicland Studios (Munich, Germany)
- Genre: Disco, soul, R&B
- Label: Elektra
- Producer: Giorgio Moroder

Ooh, La, La is the debut and only studio album by American singer, Suzi Lane, released in 1979 through Elektra Records. The album was produced by Giorgio Moroder who was also producing Donna Summer at that time. Lane said she met Summer at the recording studio and that she was influenced by the "high-energy electronica" sound pioneered by Moroder and Summer. The title track along with the song "Harmony" reached number one on Billboard magazine's Hot Dance Music/Club Play chart. The dance hit was number one for one week then remained on the chart for six months.

Soon after the release of the album, Lane was involved in a car accident in which her face was seriously injured by the broken windshield. Lane spent three years in seclusion at her home in Las Vegas recuperating.

== Track listing ==
1. "Ooh, La, La" (Chris Bennett, Giorgio Moroder, Harold Faltermeyer)
2. "Givin' It Up" (Bennett, Faltermeyer)
3. "No One Home in the City" (Bennett, Faltermeyer)
4. "Harmony" (Geoff Bastow, Moroder, Pete Bellotte)
5. "Morning, Noon and Night" (Bellotte, Moroder)
6. "Free Me" (Bellotte, Moroder)
7. "Harmony (12" version) (Bastow, Moroder, Bellotte)
8. "Ooh, La, La" (12" version) (Bennett, Moroder, Faltermeyer)
9. "Harmony" (7" version) (Bastow, Moroder, Bellotte)

== Personnel ==
- Arranged By – Harold Faltermeyer
- Art Direction – Johnny Lee, Mary Francis
- Bass – Les Hurdle
- Brass – Dino Solera's Brass Section
- Drums – Keith Forsey
- Engineer [Assistant] – Carolyn Tapp, Steven D. Smith
- Engineer [Recording & Mixing] – Harold Faltermeyer, Jürgen Koppers
- Guitar – Günther Moll, Mats Björklund
- Photography By – McGowan, Coder
- Piano, Synthesizer – Harold Faltermeyer
- Backing Vocals (Uncredited) – Suzi Lane, Gloria Weems, Yvonne Lewis
- Producer – Giorgio Moroder
- Strings – Fritz Sonnleitner
