= Knocking on Your Door =

Knocking on Your Door or Knockin' on Your Door may refer to:

- "Knocking on Your Door", a song by Erasure from Crackers International
- "Knockin' on Your Door", a song by Giorgio Moroder and Michael Holm from Spinach 1
- "Knockin' on Your Door", a song by John Fogerty from Eye of the Zombie
- "Knockin' on Your Door", a song by Michael Holm
- "Knocking on Your Door", a song by Working Week
- Knocking On Your Door, an album by Frank Carillo and Eddie Seville
