= Harold Faltermeyer =

German musician (born 1952)

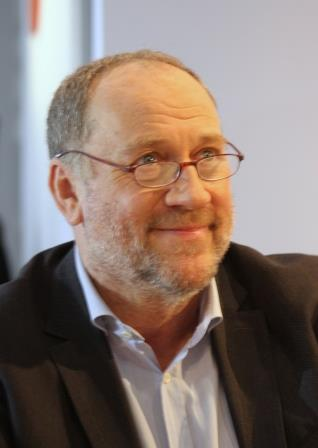
- Faltermeyer in 2016

Background information
- Born: Hans Hugo Harold Faltermeyer; 5 October 1952 (age 74); Munich, West Germany
- Genre: Synth-pop
- Occupations: Musician; record producer; songwriter; composer
- Instruments: Piano; keyboards; synthesizer
- Years active: 1977–present
- Labels: Remote Control Productions; Deutsche Grammophon; MCA; Varèse Sarabande
- Website: haroldfaltermeyer.net

Hans Hugo Harold Faltermeyer (born 5 October 1952) is a German musician, composer and record producer.

He has received numerous accolades and is internationally known for film scores of Hollywood blockbusters such as Beverly Hills Cop (which includes the influential synth-pop hit "Axel F"), Top Gun, The Running Man, and the Chevy Chase films Fletch and Fletch Lives. The Beverly Hills Cop and Top Gun projects earned him two Grammy Awards: the first in 1986 for Best Album of original score written for a motion picture or television special, as a co-writer of the Beverly Hills Cop soundtrack; and the second in 1987 for Best Pop Instrumental Performance with guitarist Steve Stevens for "Top Gun Anthem" from the Top Gun soundtrack.

As a session musician, arranger and producer, Faltermeyer has worked with numerous international pop stars including Donna Summer, Amanda Lear, Patti LaBelle, Barbra Streisand, Glenn Frey, Blondie, Laura Branigan, La Toya Jackson, Billy Idol, Jennifer Rush, Bonnie Tyler and Pet Shop Boys.

== Early life ==
Faltermeyer was born in Munich, Bavaria, the son of Anneliese (née Schmidt), a homemaker, and Hugo Faltermeier, a construction businessman. Encouraged by his parents (the owners of a civil engineering firm), he started playing piano at the age of six. At 11, a Nuremberg music professor discovered that Faltermeyer had absolute pitch. His boyhood years combined training in classical music with a developing interest in rock 'n' roll. He played organ in a rock combo and studied trumpet and piano at the University of Music and Performing Arts Munich. While still studying he found work at a recording studio. Within three years he was engineering major classical sessions for the prestigious Deutsche Grammophon label. Then in 1978, Giorgio Moroder recognized his talent and brought him to Los Angeles to play keyboards and arrange the soundtrack for the film Midnight Express. Moroder and Faltermeyer continued their collaboration in the next decade, producing Donna Summer albums and several hits for various artists. Soon Faltermeyer was earning an international reputation for both precise workmanship and trendsetting creativity in his use of synthesizer technology.

== Career ==
=== Soundtrack work ===
Alongside a busy schedule as a record producer, he became increasingly involved in soundtrack work on Moroder's scores (Midnight Express, American Gigolo and Foxes) and was soon hired as composer in his own right—usually composing, performing and producing the complete score as well as a number of pop songs penned for various artists. Early on he created work for 1984's Thief of Hearts, with electronic scoring and songs for Melissa Manchester, Annabella Lwin, Elizabeth Daily and others. Then came his big break with the landmark hip hop / breakdance-influenced score for Beverly Hills Cop, featuring the worldwide hit, the "Axel F" theme (referred to by Faltermeyer himself as the "banana theme", as it was originally written for a specific scene where Detroit policeman Axel Foley gives a pair of Beverly Hills police officers the slip by shoving bananas up their exhaust pipe, causing their car to stall when they try and tail him).

The year after, the Fletch theme expanded on his trademark electronic soundscapes with experimental phase modulated percussion effects woven into the largely analog synth melodies. He also composed the theme song, "Bit by Bit", sung by Stephanie Mills.

The full scores of these films were not released on album. Only a handful of additional score tracks complemented these hits on vinyl: "The Discovery" and "Shoot-out" from Beverly Hills Cop and "Memories" from Top Gun, and only ever as B-sides on singles. However, The Running Man and Kuffs were graced with full score albums and the Thief of Hearts and Fletch scores also received reasonably good coverage on their respective soundtrack albums. In January 2007, La La Land Records finally released a limited edition soundtrack (3000 CD copies) for Tango & Cash. In December 2016, the same label issued albums of his work on the Beverly Hills Cop series.

In 1987, Faltermeyer recorded an album called Harold F with vocal tracks featuring various guest singers plus "Axel F", which appears as a bonus track. The song "Bad Guys" is based on the (otherwise unavailable) main theme for Beverly Hills Cop II.

In 1989, Faltermeyer composed soundtrack music on the Fletch sequel Fletch Lives.

In 1990, he co-produced the album Behaviour with Pet Shop Boys at his studio near Munich. The album was released later the same year.

=== Later career ===
In Vienna, Faltermeyer and Rainhard Fendrich collaborated on the 2002 musical Wake Up. Faltermeyer also provided the soundtrack for the 2007 computer game Two Worlds. He returned to film scoring for Kevin Smith's 2010 action comedy Cop Out starring Bruce Willis. Faltermeyer's music is also featured in Top Gun: Maverick.

In May 2022 Faltermeyer published his autobiography Where's the Orchestra? My Story as an ebook to coincide with the release of Top Gun: Maverick.

== Discography ==
=== Film scores ===
Year	Title	Director	Notes
1984	Non-Stop Trouble with My Double	Reinhard Schwabenitzky	With Arthur Lauber
1984	Thief of Hearts	Douglas Day Stewart	
1984	Beverly Hills Cop	Martin Brest	also co-wrote "The Heat Is On" with Keith Forsey.
1985	Fletch	Michael Ritchie	
1986	Top Gun	Tony Scott	
1986	Fire and Ice (Feuer und Eis)	Willy Bogner Jr.	With Hermann Weindorf, one song
1987	Fatal Beauty	Tom Holland	
1987	Beverly Hills Cop II	Tony Scott	Also co-wrote and produced "Shakedown"
1987	The Running Man	Paul Michael Glaser	Deluxe Edition soundtrack released in 2020
1987	Starlight Express	Andrew Lloyd Webber	"The Race is On"
1989	Fletch Lives	Michael Ritchie	
1989	Tango & Cash	Andrei Konchalovsky	Soundtrack released in 2006
1990	Blue Blood	Sidney Hayers	TV mini-series, with Hermann Weindorf
1990	Fire, Ice & Dynamite	Willy Bogner Jr.	
1992	Kuffs	Bruce A. Evans	
1994	White Magic	Willy Bogner Jr.	
1994	Asterix Conquers America	Gerhard Hahn	
1995	Frankie	Christoph Schrewe	TV mini-series
1997	The King of St. Pauli	Dieter Wedel	TV mini-series
1997	Jack Orlando	Toontraxx	Video game
2002	Wake Up	Jorge Navarro Fica	
2007	Two Worlds	Reality Pump	Video game
2010	Cop Out	Kevin Smith	
2022	Top Gun: Maverick	Joseph Kosinski	With Hans Zimmer and Lady Gaga

=== Albums ===
As songwriter / producer / arranger / musician / remixer

- Amanda Lear: I Am a Photograph (1977)
- Roberta Kelly: Gettin' the Spirit (1978)
- Dee D. Jackson: Cosmic Curves (1978)
- Giorgio Moroder and Chris Bennett: Love's in You, Love's in Me (1978)
- Giorgio Moroder: Battlestar Galactica (1978)
- Giorgio Moroder: E=mc^{2} (1979)
- Janis Ian: Night Rains (1979)
- Suzi Lane: Ooh La La (1979)
- The Sylvers: Disco Fever (1979)
- The Three Degrees: Three D (1979)
- Donna Summer: Bad Girls (1979)
- Donna Summer: The Wanderer (1980)
- Sparks: Terminal Jive (1980)
- Donna Summer: I'm a Rainbow (1981, shelved until 1996)
- Al Corley: Square Rooms (1984)
- Laura Branigan: Self Control (1984)
- Laura Branigan: Hold Me (1985)
- Richard T. Bear: The Runner (1985)
- E. G. Daily: Wild Child (1985)
- Billy Idol: Whiplash Smile (1986)
- Donna Summer: All Systems Go (1987)
- Jennifer Rush: Heart over Mind (1987)
- Jennifer Rush: Passion (1988)
- Chris Thompson: The Challenge (Face It) (1989)
- Franzisca: Hold the Dream (1990)
- Pet Shop Boys: Behaviour (1990)
- Dominoe: The Key (1990)
- Chris Thompson: Beat of Love (1991)
- Falco: "Jeanny (Remix)" (1991)
- Falco: "Emotional (Remix)" (1991)
- Chaya: Here's to Miracles (1993)
- Marshall & Alexander: Marshall & Alexander (1998)
- Bonnie Tyler: All in One Voice (1999)

=== Selected singles ===
As songwriter / arranger / producer

- Camino De Lobo: "Carmen Disco Suite" (1983)
- Glenn Frey: "The Heat Is On" (1984)
- Patti LaBelle: "Stir It Up" (1984)
- Valerie Claire: "I'm a Model (Tonight's the Night)" (1984)
- Valerie Claire: "Shoot Me Gino" (1985)
- Marietta: "Fire and Ice" (1986)
- John Parr: "Restless Heart (Running Away with You)" (1988) (not available on the Running Man soundtrack album)
- Chris Thompson: "The Challenge (Face It)" (Wimbledon 1989 theme, 7" & CD including instrumental version)
- Artists United for Nature: "Yes We Can" (1989) (7" & CD including instrumental version)
- Kathy Joe Daylor: "With Every Beat of My Heart" (1990)

=== Solo albums ===
- Worldhits (1987) (Instrumental disco arrangements of various well-known songs)
- Harold F (1988)
- Harold Faltermeyer featuring Joe Pizzulo: "Olympic Dreams" (1992) (CD single)

=== Solo singles including instrumental themes ===
Year	Single	Peak chart positions					Certifications
Year	Single	US Pop	US Adult	US Dance	US R&B	UK	Certifications
1984	"Axel F"	3	1	1	13	2	BPI: Silver
1984	"Final Confrontation"	―	―	―	―	―	
1985	"Fletch Theme"	―	―	―	―	74	
1986	"Formula One"	―	―	―	―	―	
1987	"The Race Is On"	―	―	―	―	―	
1988	"Must Be Paradise"	―	―	―	―	―	
1988	"Prophecy"	―	―	―	―	―	
"—" denotes releases that did not chart or were not released in that territory.

=== Collections ===
- Portrait of Harold Faltermeyer: His Greatest Hits (2003 double CD)

== See also ==
- List of Billboard number-one dance club songs
- List of artists who reached number one on the U.S. Dance Club Songs chart
- List of German Academy Award winners and nominees
- List of Euro disco artists
- List of synthpop artists
