= Love's in You, Love's in Me =

Studio album by Giorgio Moroder and Chris Bennett
- Released: 23 June 1978
- Studio: Musicland, Munich; Westlake, Los Angeles, California
- Genre: Disco
- Label: Casablanca
- Producer: Giorgio Moroder, Pete Bellotte

Giorgio Moroder chronology
From Here to Eternity (1977)	Love's in You, Love's in Me (1978)	E=MC² (1979)

Singles from Love's In You, Love's In Me
- 1. "Love's In You (Love's In Me) / I Can't Wait" Released: 1978; 2. "Love Now, Hurt Later / Let This Night Go On For Days" Released: 1978

Love's in You, Love's in Me is a 1978 album by Giorgio Moroder and Chris Bennett.

== Track listing ==
All tracks composed by Giorgio Moroder and Pete Bellotte

1. "Love's in You, Love's in Me" - 3:46
2. "Keep It Together" - 3:32
3. "I Can't Wait" - 4:15
4. "Reprise" - 5:07
5. "Love Now, Hurt Later" - 6:10
6. "Burning the Midnight Oil" - 4:56
7. "Let This Night Go On for Days" - 6:00

== Personnel ==
- Giorgio Moroder - producer
- Bob Esty, Geoff Bastow, Harold Faltermeyer, Keith Forsey, Les Hurdle, Thor Baldursson - musicians
- Claudia Schwarz, Gitta Walther, Lucy O'Neale - choir
- Dan Wyman - Moog programming
