= Born to Die (disambiguation) =

Born to Die is a 2012 album by Lana Del Rey.

Born to Die may also refer to:

== Music ==
=== Albums ===
- Born to Die (Grand Funk Railroad album), 1976
- Born to Die: The Paradise Edition, a 2012 reissue of the Lana Del Rey album

=== Songs ===
- "Born to Die" (Lana Del Rey song), 2011
- Born to Die (Shaboozey song), 2026
- "Born to Die", a 1974 single by Giorgio Moroder
- "Born to Die", a 1976 song by Grand Funk Railroad from the album Born to Die
- "Born to Die", a 1982 song by MDC from Millions of Dead Cops
- "Born to Die", a 1996 song by Choking Victim from Squatta's Paradise
- "Born to Die", a 1997 song by Anti-Flag and d.b.s. from North America Sucks!!
- "Born to Die", a 1997 song by Sevendust from Sevendust
- "Born 2 Die", a 2021 song by Prince from Welcome 2 America
- "And Am I Born to Die?", a hymn written in 1780 by Charles Wesley

== Other uses ==
- Born to Die, a 1974 SEC documentary on Yallourn
- "Born to Die", a 1997 short story by Andy Griffiths from Just Tricking!
- "Born 2 Die" (Atlanta), a 2022 episode of the series Atlanta

== See also ==
- "Everyone's Born to Die", 2006 song by Electric Light Orchestra from On the Third Day
- "Born to Live, Born to Die", 1969 single by The Foundations
- "Born to Lie", 2017 song by Dreamcar from Dreamcar
