= Knights in White Satin =

Studio album by Giorgio Moroder
- Released: April 1976
- Recorded: 1975–1976
- Studio: Musicland Studios, Munich
- Genre: Disco
- Length: 31:04
- Label: Oasis
- Producer: Giorgio Moroder

Giorgio Moroder chronology
Einzelgänger (1975)	Knights in White Satin (1976)	From Here to Eternity (1977)

Singles from Knights in White Satin
- 1. "Knights In White Satin / I Wanna Funk With You Tonite" Released: 1976; 2. "I Wanna Funk With You Tonite / Oh, L'Amour" Released: 1976; 3. "Let The Music Play" (originally a stand-alone single; featured on 2001 album re-release)/ "Oh, L'Amour" Released: 1977

Knights in White Satin is a 1976 album composed, produced and performed by Giorgio Moroder.

Side A of the album is a continuous three part suite, consisting of a disco version of the Moody Blues' 1967 hit "Nights in White Satin", with a Moroder/Bellotte composition called "In the Middle of the Knight" acting as the second (middle) section. The composition is typical of the disco era in that it covers an entire LP side, but atypical as it is quite slow, only 110bpm, and not what was usually considered the standard at the time, which was 120bpm.

The primary bass line figure used in the "Knights in White Satin" track was re-used, at a faster tempo and with additional delay effects, in "Chase", recorded for Moroder's 1978 soundtrack of Alan Parker's film, Midnight Express.

== Track listing ==
=== Side 1 ===
1. "Knights in White Satin" (Justin Hayward) - 4:48
2. "In the Middle of the Knight" (Giorgio Moroder, Pete Bellotte) - 5:15
3. "Knights in White Satin" (Justin Hayward) - 5:06

=== Side 2 ===
4. "Oh, l'amour" (Giorgio Moroder, Pete Bellotte) - 5:45
5. "Sooner or Later" (Giorgio Moroder, Pete Bellotte) - 5:36
6. "I Wanna Funk with You Tonite" (Giorgio Moroder, Pete Bellotte) - 5:24

=== 2011 CD Bonus Tracks ===
7. "Let The Music Play" (Single Version) - 3:39
8. "Oh L'Amour" (Single Version) - 5:20
9. "I Wanna Funk With You Tonite" (Single Version) - 3:54
10. "Knights In White Satin" (Single Version) - 3:52

== Personnel ==
Giorgio is accompanied by a group known as "The Munich Machine", which is composed of

- Keith Forsey: Drums, percussion
- Thor Baldursson: Keyboards, piano, organ
- Gary Unwin: Bass
- Günther Moll: Guitars
- Frank Dietz: Guitars

== Charts ==
Chart (1977)	Peak position
Australia (Kent Music Report)	43
