= Raney Shockne =

- Occupations: Composer, record producer, songwriter
- Instruments: Piano, bass, percussion, vocals
- Label: RCA Records

Raney Shockne is an American music composer and producer based in Los Angeles. He has written and produced songs for Giorgio Moroder, Pitbull, Britney Spears, Foxes, Matthew Koma, Leona Lewis and others. His score and songwriting collaborations have appeared in over 30 films and 100 televisions shows to date. Shockne is perhaps best known as the composer of USA drama Queen of the South, CBS primetime comedy Kevin Can Wait, Anger Management (FX Network) starring Charlie Sheen, the film The To Do List (Aubrey Plaza), and Fame, where his remake of the title song reached the American Billboard Hot 100. Additionally, Shockne's current video game credits include Cyberpunk 2077, Star Wars Battlefront II, Tron RUN/r, Dragon Age: Inquisition and The Sims franchise.

== Film work ==
- The Wedding Year [composer]
- Josie [composer]
- Cover Versions [composer]
- Peppermint [original songs]
- The Assignment [composer]
- American Pastoral [original songs]
- Internet Famous [composer]
- Zoolander 2 [original songs]
- Sharknado 3: Oh Hell No! [original songs]
- Ashby [original songs]
- The Age Of Adaline [original songs]
- McFarland USA [original songs]
- The To Do List [composer]
- Tzipora's Nest
- Stand Up Guys [original songs]
- Scream 4 [original songs]
- The First Time
- The Back-up Plan [original songs]
- Crank: High Voltage [original songs]
- Fame (2009) [original songs / title track / on screen music production]
- Untraceable [original songs]
- Fuel [original songs]
- Feathers to the Sky
- Chasing the Dream (Documentary) [original songs]
- Novel Romance
- Rising Son: The Legend of Skateboarder Christian Hosoi [additional songs]
- Shafted!
- Love from Ground Zero [composer: additional music]

== Television work ==
- Debris [composer]
- Queen of the South [composer]
- Haunted [composer]
- Ultimate Surfer [composer]
- Kevin Can Wait [composer]
- Project Runway [composer]
- Anger Management [main title / composer]
- Pawn Stars [composer]
- Deadliest Catch [original songs]
- Make It Pop [composer]
- Project Runway: Junior [composer]
- The Incredible Dr. Pol [main title / composer]
- Finding Bigfoot [composer]
- Project Runway: Threads [composer]
- Under the Gunn [composer]
- Best Ink [composer]
- Tiny House Nation [composer]
- American Restoration [composer]
- The Governor's Wife [composer]
- Chasing Tail [composer]
- Cajun Pawn Stars [composer]
- Project Runway All Stars [composer]
- Counting Cars [composer]
- CSI [original songs]
- CSI: NY [original songs]
- Vegas [original songs]
- Jersey Shore [composer]
- Funny or Die Presents [composer]
- The Real L Word [composer]
- Run's House [composer]
- Taking the Stage [composer]
- True Life [composer]
- Men of a Certain Age [original songs]
- Burn Notice [original songs]
- Film School [composer]

== Videogame work ==
- Star Wars Battlefront II [original songs]
- Tron RUN/r [original songs]
- Dragon Age: Inquisition [original songs]
- The Sims 4 [original songs]
- Cyberpunk 2077 [original songs, as Point Break Candy]
- Wanted: Dead [covers]

== Album work ==
- Pitbull: La Reina De Blanco [Mr. 305 Inc.]
- Giorgio Moroder: Deja Vu [RCA Records]
- Britney Spears: Tom’s Diner [RCA Records]
- Matthew Koma: Tempted [RCA Records]
- Foxes: Wildstar [RCA Records]
- Fame: Naturi Naughton [Lakeshore Records]
