= E=MC² (Giorgio Moroder album) =

Studio album by Giorgio Moroder
- Released: 27 August 1979
- Recorded: Soundstream Inc.
- Genre: Disco; electronic
- Length: 31:07
- Label: Casablanca
- Producer: Giorgio Moroder; Harold Faltermeyer

Giorgio Moroder chronology
Love's in You, Love's in Me (1978)	E=MC² (1979)	Solitary Men (1983)

Singles from E=MC²
- 1. "Baby Blue" Released: 1979; 2. "What a Night" Released: 1979; 3. "If You Weren't Afraid"

E=MC² is a 1979 studio album by Italian producer Giorgio Moroder. It has been billed as the "first electronic live-to-digital album." The album peaked at number 4 (listed as all cuts) on Billboard's Dance Club/Disco chart.

== Critical reception ==
Professional ratings
Review scores
Source	Rating
AllMusic	4/5 stars
DownBeat	1/5 stars

Alex Henderson of AllMusic said: "This is the electronic dance music that preceded the rise of techno, house, and industrial noise, and it came at a time when hip-hop was in its infancy and the rave subculture had yet to be invented." He described it as "a historically interesting LP that anyone who has enjoyed electronic dance rhythms needs to check out." Kyle Fowle of The A.V. Club wrote, "The title track includes some of Moroder's finest vocoder work while songs like 'I Wanna Rock You' and 'Baby Blue' see Moroder delivering some of his most polished disco efforts, removed from the rawness of those Donna Summer tracks but still very indebted to them."

== Track listing ==
No.	Title	Writer(s)	Length
1.	"Baby Blue"	Keith Forsey, Giorgio Moroder	4:54
2.	"What a Night"	Harold Faltermeyer, Forsey, Moroder	4:54
3.	"If You Weren't Afraid"	Chris Bennett, Moroder	5:40
4.	"I Wanna Rock You"	Faltermeyer, Forsey, Moroder	6:32
5.	"In My Wildest Dreams"	Bennett, Faltermeyer, Moroder	4:37
6.	"E=MC²"	Pete Bellotte, Faltermeyer, Moroder	4:32

2001 reissue CD edition bonus tracks
No.	Title	Writer(s)	Length
7.	"Love's in You, Love's in Me"	Bellotte, Moroder	3:35
8.	"Evolution"	Moroder	15:15

2013 reissue CD edition bonus tracks
No.	Title	Writer(s)	Length
7.	"Baby Blue" (single version)	Forsey, Moroder	3:52
8.	"If You Weren't Afraid" (single version)	Bennett, Moroder	3:53
9.	"I Wanna Rock You" (single version)	Faltermeyer, Forsey, Moroder	3:51

== Charts ==
Chart (1980)	Peak position
Australia (Kent Music Report)	93

== Personnel ==
Credits adapted from liner notes.

- Giorgio Moroder – production
- Harold Faltermeyer – production, engineer, mixing, programming
- Keith Forsey – drums, percussion
- Jules Bloomenthal – computerized digital editing
- Bruce Rothaar – computerized digital editing
- Brian Gardner – mastering
- Henry Vizcarra – artwork
- Glenn Parsons – artwork
- Ron Slenzak – photography
- David Ingebretsen – computer photography
- Shusei Nagaoka – illustration
