= K.I.D. (musician) =

K.I.D. (Geoff Bastow)
- Born: Geoffrey Bastow; 20 May 1949; Yorkshire, England, United Kingdom
- Died: 16 March 2007 (aged 57) Berlin, Germany
- Genres: Post-disco; Euro disco Hi-NRG
- Labels: Baby Records (Italy); Bruton Music (UK); SAM Records (US); Sonoton (Germany)

K.I.D. was a British Euro disco musician of the early 1980s best known for his SAM import and club hit "You Don't Like My Music (Hupendi Muziki Wangu?!)" that entered the Billboard Club charts. The name is a pseudonym used by Geoffrey Bastow.

== Career ==
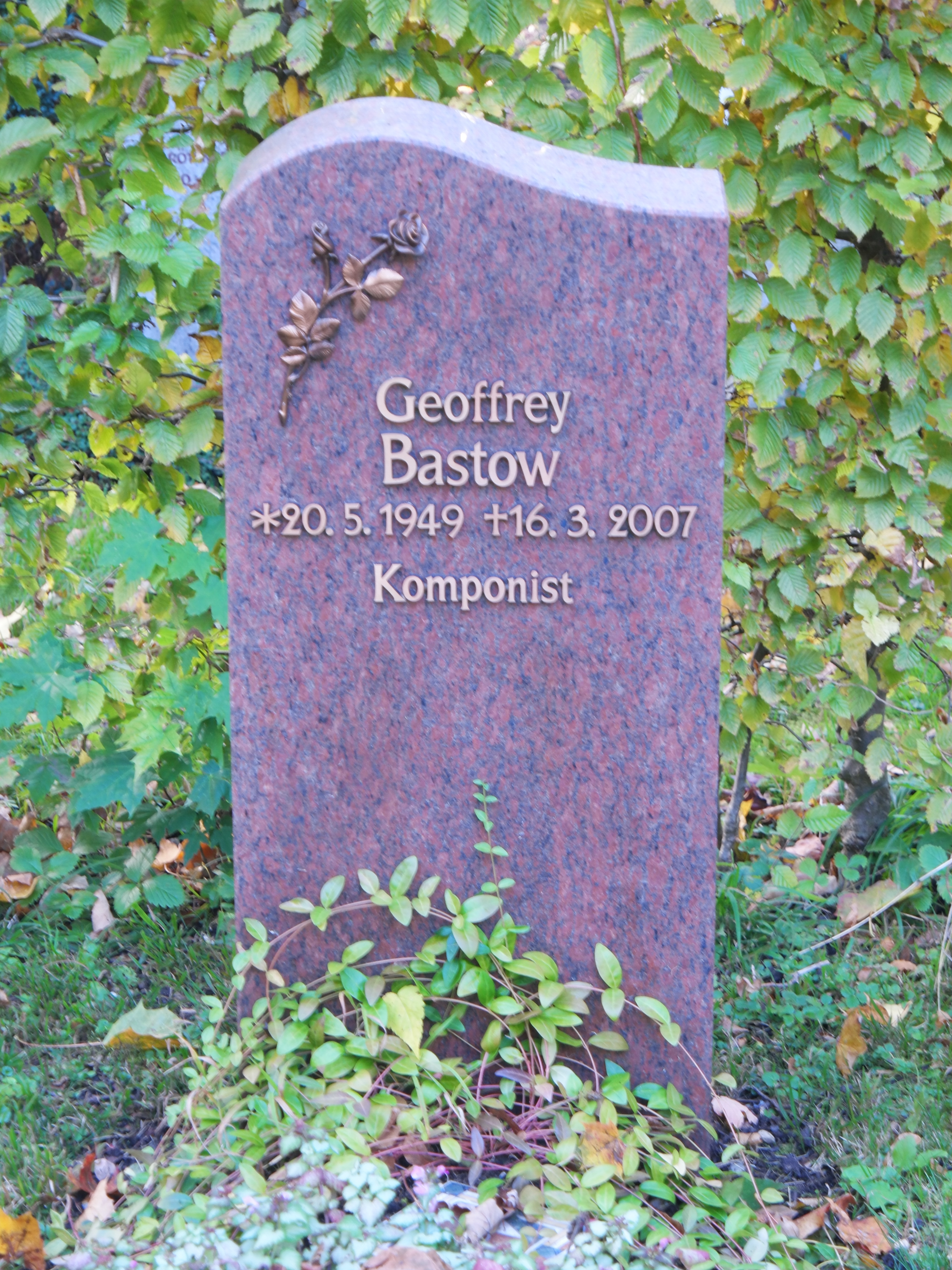
Grave of Geoffrey Bastow on the Westfriedhof in Munich

Bastow, who is also known as Geoff Bastow (20 May 1949 in Yorkshire, England – 16 March 2007 in Berlin, Germany), was a Munich-based English songwriter and record producer.

In the early 1970s, Bastow recorded albums such as Music To Varnish Owls By (1975), Flavour Of The Month (1977) and The Video Age (1980) for various British labels. Originally working as a guitarist and pianist in dance bands around Yorkshire, he moved to London in the early 1970s, and then Munich in around 1976. He collaborated with disco/electronic innovator Giorgio Moroder around that era. He also toured with Engelbert Humperdinck's band as a guitarist.

Aside from his main work as K.I.D., he has also worked as a session musician for Euro disco acts such as Amanda Lear (1981 album Incognito), Boney M (1981 album Boonoonoonoos), Mick Jackson and Gary Lux.

He wrote songs for artists including Elton John (song "Born Bad" from Victim of Love) and Suzi Lane ("Harmony"). Bastow co-composed with Mick Jackson the Austrian entry for Eurovision Song Contest in 1985, entitled "Kinder dieser Welt" which was sung by Gary Lux. The song placed 8th among 19 songs.

Bastow, as an electronic act called K.I.D. managed to get into the Billboard Dance Club charts in 1981. It entered the chart around September 1981, reaching No. 54 in 26 September, respectively. Around 14 November, it jumped to position No. 10. His brother Trevor (1945–2000) was also a noted London composer and session pianist. His younger brother Phil Bastow is also a musician.

Bastow has had a number of his compositions used in notable video productions. Some of his music can be heard in the children's video series There Goes a... also known as Real Wheels hosted by Dave Hood and Richard Blade's Video One. For example, in the video There Goes a Fire Truck, his songs "Current Advances 1", "Current Advances 3", "and Horizons 1" are used as background music. "Daytime Drama" was used in the SpongeBob SquarePants episode "Dumped". Posthumously, some of his production music has appeared in Check It Out! with Dr. Steve Brule, an Adult Swim comedy show stylized to parody public-access television. Geoffrey Bastow also contributed Lyrics for 'We Need Protection’, which was a song composed by Edwin Hind and Eckhart Debusmann techno-funk band ‘Picnic At The Whitehouse’ (CBS RECORDS/Portrait 1985 – 1990. This Record is still referred as one of the most Important songs of the eighties. Bastow died in Berlin, Germany on 16 March 2007, at the age of 57.

== Discography ==
=== Albums as K.I.D. ===
#	Name	Label	Notes
1980	Number One	Esquire	Recorded in Milano, Italy
1981	Don't Stop	Ariola / Baby Records	Recorded at Union Studios, Munich, Germany
1982	Fine Time Tonight	Baby	Recorded at Union Studios, Munich, Germany

=== Albums as Geoff Bastow (Incomplete) ===
#	Name	Label	Notes
1975	Music To Varnish Owls By	JW Music Library
1976	Double Exposure	Programme Music	Trevor Bastow is a co-composer of the album.
1976	Merry Christmas	Impress	Anthony Mawer is a co-composer of the album.
1977	Flavour Of The Month	JW Theme Music
1980	The Video Age	Bruton Music	Trevor Bastow is a co-composer of the album.
1982	Tomorrows World	Bruton Music
1986	The AV Conception Volume 1	Sonoton
1987	Industry 2 - New Look	Music House
1987	The AV Conception Volume 2	Sonoton
1992	Daytime Drama	Sonoton
1995	Daytime Drama 2	Sonoton

=== Singles as K.I.D. ===
#	Name	Label	Info
1981	"Don't Stop" / "Do It Again"	Baby (Italy); SAM (US)	#4 Dance
1981	"It's Hot (Take It To The Top)" / "Hupendi Muziki Wangu?! (You Don't Like My Music)"	SAM (US)	#10 Dance
1981	"No 1." / "You Can't Keep Me Waiting"	Esquire (Italy); Record Shack (UK)	-
1982	"I Wanna Piece Of The Action"	Baby (Italy); Carrere (UK, France)	-
1983	"Come And Get It"	Baby (Italy)	-
