= From Here to Eternity (Giorgio Moroder song) =

Single by Giorgio

from the album From Here to Eternity
- B-side: "Utopia"; "Too Hot to Handle"
- Released: September 1977
- Genre: Disco; electro-funk
- Length: 5:58 (album version); 3:52 (single edit)
- Label: Casablanca
- Songwriters: Giorgio Moroder; Pete Bellotte
- Producer: Giorgio Moroder

Giorgio singles chronology
"Let the Music Play" (1977)	"From Here to Eternity" (1977)	"Utopia - Me Giorgio" (1977)

"From Here to Eternity" is a song by Italian singer, songwriter, and producer Giorgio Moroder, released in 1977 as a single from an album of the same name.

== Song information ==
The song was written by Giorgio Moroder and Pete Bellotte, and produced by Moroder. The song is performed entirely on electronic keyboards and showcases the synthesized futuristic sound which Moroder also explored on Donna Summer's I Remember Yesterday (most notably the single "I Feel Love") and Once Upon a Time, both released in 1977.

On most editions of the single, "Utopia - Me Giorgio" was released as the B-side. Upon its original release, the single received a 5-star review in Blues & Soul magazine. In a retrospective AllMusic review, John Bush marked the song as one of the highlights on its parent album.

"From Here to Eternity" was featured in the 1978 movie Thank God It's Friday, but not included on the soundtrack album.

Two re-recordings of the song were made for the 2000 various artists compilation DJ Empire Presents: A Tribute to Giorgio Moroder. First was the remix by Danny Tenaglia, released as the single in various formats, which was a club chart hit in the US. The other version was produced by American musician Eric D. Clark, with French singer Amanda Lear on vocals, credited to Giorgio Moroder vs. Eric D. Clark feat. Amanda Lear. A short version of the Tox N Stone remix also appeared on Lear's hits compilation Forever Glam! in 2005.

"From Here to Eternity", along with other tracks from the same album, was featured in the popular video game Grand Theft Auto: Liberty City Stories (2005) on fictional radio station Flashback FM.

== Music video ==
The music video pictures Moroder performing the song and playing keyboards in a studio, interspersed with footage of a woman dancing against a black background. Halfway through the video, "From Here to Eternity" segues into "Utopia - Me Giorgio".

== Track listing ==
- 7" Single (1977)

A. "From Here to Eternity" – 3:52
B. "Utopia" – 4:17

- 7" Single (UK, 1977)

A. "From Here to Eternity" – 3:52
B. "Too Hot to Handle" – 4:51

- 7" Single (Bolivia, 1979)

A. "From Here to Eternity"
B. "First Hand Experience in Second Hand Love"

- CD Maxi Single (2000) – Giorgio Moroder vs. Danny Tenaglia
1. "From Here to Eternity" (Danny Tenaglia Radio Edit) – 4:34
2. "From Here to Eternity" (Danny Tenaglia Extended Club Mix) – 13:04
3. "From Here to Eternity" (Danny Tenaglia Dub Mix) – 9:35
4. "From Here to Eternity" (Danny's New Dub) – 8:50
5. "From Here to Eternity" (Danny Tenaglia Padapella) – 2:47
- 12" Single (2000) – Giorgio Moroder vs. Eric D. Clark feat. Amanda Lear

A. "From Here to Eternity" (Tox N Stone Club Mix) – 6:25
B1. "From Here to Eternity" (Eric D. Clark Passport) – 7:01
B2. "From Here to Eternity" (Whirlpool Maximum Passion Mix) – 8:10

== Chart performance ==
Chart (1977)	Peak position
Austria	8
Belgium (Flanders)	14
France	73
Germany	29
Italy	22
Netherlands (Dutch Top 40)	19
Netherlands (Mega Top 50)	22
Netherlands (Single Top 100)	22
UK Singles Chart (OCC)	16

Chart (2000)	Peak position
US Dance Club Songs (Billboard)	20
