= Einzelgänger =

Studio album by Giorgio Moroder
- Released: September 1975
- Recorded: 1975
- Studios: Musicland, Munich, Germany
- Genres: Electronic; experimental
- Label: Oasis
- Producer: Giorgio Moroder

Giorgio Moroder chronology
Spinach 1 (1973)	Einzelgänger (1975)	Knights in White Satin (1976)

Singles from Einzelgänger
- 1. "Einzelgänger / Einzelgänger" Released: 1975; 2. "Einzelgänger / Liebes-Arie" Released: 1975; 3. "Einzelgänger / Good Old Germany" Released: 1976

Einzelgänger is a 1975 electronic experimental album composed, produced and performed by Giorgio Moroder. It was first released in Germany on Moroder's label, Oasis, and later by Neil Bogart on his label, Casablanca Records.

As described by music critic Simon Reynolds, the album "teems with pitter-pattering drum machine beats and unsettling processed vocal-stutters that recall the ethereal whimsy of early Kraftwerk", and foreshadowed Moroder's work two years later on "I Feel Love", a pioneering track for electronic disco music.

== Track listing ==
1. "Einzelgänger (Lone Wolf; literally 'Loner')" - 4:37
2. "Aus (The End)" - 6:52
3. "Warum (Why)" - 3:08
4. "Percussiv" - 3:58
5. "Good Old Germany" - 5:08
6. "Basslich" - 2:50
7. "Untergang (Ruin)" - 5:10
8. "Liebes-Arie (Love Song)" - 4:48
9. "Einzelganger" - 1:54
