= Giorgio (album) =

Studio album by Giorgio Moroder
- Released: 1970
- Recorded: 1970
- Genre: Psychedelic rock
- Label: Fermata
- Producer: Giorgio Moroder

Giorgio Moroder chronology
That's Bubblegum – That's Giorgio (1969)	Giorgio (1970)	Son Of My Father (1972)

Singles from Giorgio
- 1. "Moody Trudy / Stop" Released: 1969; 2. "Muny, Muny, Muny" Released: 1970; 3. "Arizona Man / Sally Don't You Cry" Released: 1970

Giorgio is the second studio album by Italian producer Giorgio Moroder. Released in 1970, it is essentially a re-release of his previous (debut) album, That's Bubblegum – That's Giorgio with a slightly modified track list (eliminating some songs from the debut album, while adding several new ones). The cover features the same image as the single "Looky, Looky" (which ironically does not appear on this album, though it was originally featured on That's Bubblegum).

== Track listing ==
1. "Sorry Suzanne" (Geoff Stephens, Tony Macaulay) - 2:54
2. "Make Me Your Baby" (Fred Jay, Moroder) - 2:24
3. "Mercy" (Joey Levine, Steve Feldman) - 2:12
4. "Moody Trudy" (Moroder, Peter Rainford) - 2:24
5. "Sally Don't You Cry" (Moroder, Murray, Callander) - 2:41
6. "Mendocino" (Doug Sahm) - 2:30
7. "Muny Muny Muny" (Joachim Heider, Michael Holm) - 3:02
8. "Gimme Gimme Good Lovin'" (Joey Levine, Ritchie Cordell) - 2:07
9. "Bad Moon Rising" (John Fogerty) - 2:20
10. "Arizona Man" (Moroder, Murray, Callander) - 5:06
