= Musicland Studios =

Recording studio in Munich established by Giorgio Moroder

Coordinates: 48°9′0.39″N 11°37′10.21″E

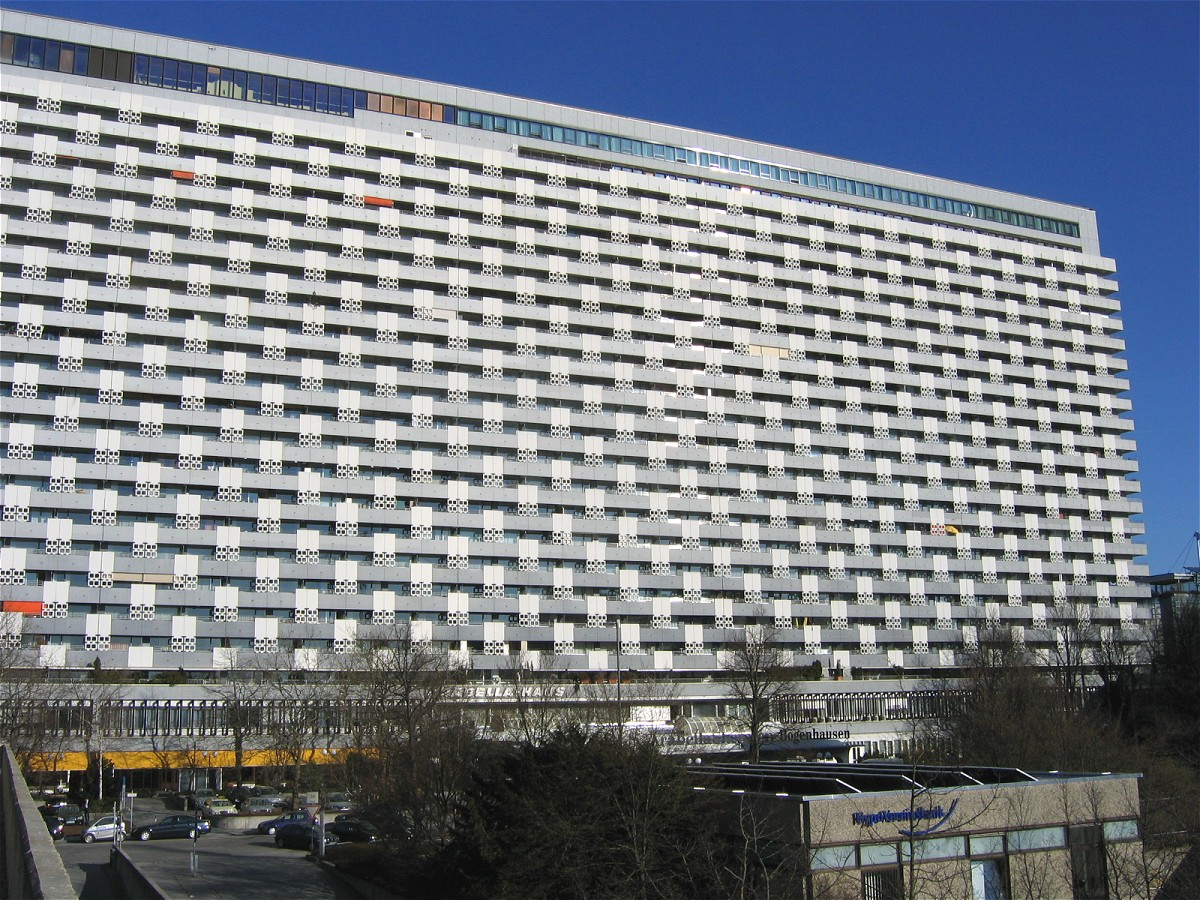
The Arabella Hochhaus, where Musicland Studios was located in the basement

Musicland Studios was a recording studio located in Munich, Germany, established by the Italian record producer, songwriter and musician Giorgio Moroder in the early 1970s. The studios were known for their work with artists such as Donna Summer, Electric Light Orchestra, and Queen, among others.

== History ==
Moroder founded the studio modestly in a small space in the basement of the Arabella High-Rise Building. The studio featured a 16-track recorder and a Helios mixing console which was later upgraded to a 48 channel Harrison console in 1976. Moroder hired engineer Reinhold Mack, who eventually complained that the small studio was uncomfortably hot at all times because it was adjacent to the building's central heating system, encouraging Moroder to expand the studios. Utilizing funds from his new Phonogram record deal and the success of Chicory Tip's version of "Son of My Father", co-composed by Moroder and Pete Belotte, Moroder and Mack expanded the studio in 1973. The first recording session in the new studios was for the recording of the Marc Bolan & T. Rex album Zinc Alloy and the Hidden Riders of Tomorrow (1974). Other rock bands recording there included the Rolling Stones, Deep Purple, Uriah Heep, Rainbow, and Led Zeppelin.

Donna Summer, who was working as a part-time model and backing singer in Munich, met Moroder and Bellotte during a session at the studios and they signed Summer to their Oasis label. The three began working together, resulting in several hit albums and singles, including "Love to Love You" and "I Feel Love", which is widely credited as one of the most influential records originating electronic dance music and paving the way for house and techno music. Electric Light Orchestra recorded several of the band's most successful albums at the studio with Reinhold Mack, beginning with 1975's Face the Music.

Mack co-produced Queen's 1980 album The Game at Musicland Studios, along with its hit singles "Another One Bites the Dust" and "Crazy Little Thing Called Love". Mack is referenced in the lyrics of "Dragon Attack": "gonna use my stack/it's gotta be Mack". Queen returned to Musicland in 1982 to record Hot Space, and in 1985 for "One Vision", with much of the music video for the song consisting of footage of the band recording the song at Musicland.

Other artists who recorded at Musicland Studios included the Three Degrees, Iron Maiden, Amanda Lear, Freddie Mercury, Sweet and Elton John, and Moroder himself recorded several of his own projects at the studio, including the soundtrack to Midnight Express, which won the Academy Award for Best Original Score in 1979.

Musicland Studios closed at the beginning of the 1990s, as noise from the nearby U4 metro was interfering with the quality of the studio's recordings. However, Reinhold Mack vehemently contradicts this view in a BR radio feature from 2025: it was not the construction of the underground railway, but a rent increase of almost 100 per cent that spelled the end for the studio.

== Selected list of albums recorded at Musicland (by year) ==
- Three Dog Night: Cyan - 1973
- The Rolling Stones: It's Only Rock 'n Roll - 1974
- Deep Purple: Stormbringer - 1974
- Donna Summer: Lady of the Night - 1974
- Faust: Punkt - 1974
- Marc Bolan & T. Rex: Zinc Alloy and the Hidden Riders of Tomorrow - 1974
- Scorpions: Fly to the Rainbow - 1974
- Uriah Heep: Wonderworld - 1974
- Deep Purple: Come Taste the Band - 1975
- Donna Summer: Love to Love You Baby - 1975
- Electric Light Orchestra: Face the Music - 1975
- Giorgio Moroder: Einzelgänger - 1975
- Rainbow: Ritchie Blackmore's Rainbow - 1975
- The Rolling Stones: Black and Blue - 1975
- The Sweet: Give Us a Wink - 1975
- Donna Summer: A Love Trilogy - 1976
- Donna Summer: Four Seasons of Love - 1976
- Electric Light Orchestra: A New World Record - 1976
- Giorgio Moroder: Knights in White Satin - 1976
- Iggy Pop: The Idiot - 1976
- Led Zeppelin: Presence - 1975
- Rainbow: Rising - 1976
- Rory Gallagher: Calling Card - 1976
- David Coverdale: White Snake - 1977
- Donna Summer: I Remember Yesterday - 1977
- Donna Summer: Once Upon a Time - 1977
- Electric Light Orchestra: Out of the Blue - 1977
- Giorgio Moroder: From Here to Eternity - 1977
- Amanda Lear: Never Trust a Pretty Face - 1979
- Electric Light Orchestra: Discovery - 1979
- Electric Light Orchestra: Xanadu (soundtrack) - 1979
- Elton John: Victim of Love - 1979
- Sparks: No. 1 in Heaven - 1979
- Suzi Lane: Ooh La La - 1979
- Queen: The Game - 1980
- Electric Light Orchestra: Time - 1981
- Sparks: Whomp That Sucker - 1981
- Queen: Hot Space - 1982
- Sparks: Angst in My Pants - 1982
- Roger Taylor: Strange Frontier - 1984
- Whitesnake: Slide It In - 1984
- Spandau Ballet: Parade - 1984
- Freddie Mercury: Mr. Bad Guy - 1985
- Philip Oakey and Giorgio Moroder: Philip Oakey & Giorgio Moroder - 1985
- Limahl: Colour All My Days - 1986
- Spandau Ballet: Through the Barricades - 1986
- Donna Summer: All Systems Go - 1987
- Iron Maiden: Seventh Son of a Seventh Son - 1988
