= Giorgio's Music =

Studio album by Giorgio Moroder
- Released: 1973
- Recorded: 1973
- Genre: Schlager
- Label: Philips
- Producer: Giorgio Moroder

Giorgio Moroder chronology
Son Of My Father (1972)	Giorgio's Music (1973)	Spinach 1 (1973)

Singles from Giorgio's Music
- 1. "Lonely Lovers' Symphony / Crippled Words" Released: 1973; 2. "Heaven Helps The Man (Who Helps Himself) / Sandy" Released: 1973; 3. "Hilf Dir Selbst / Geh Zu Ihm" Released: 1973; 4. "Marrakesh / Nostalgie" Released: 1973

Giorgio's Music is a 1973 album composed, produced and performed by Giorgio Moroder. Though he had intermittently recorded singles in German, Giorgio's Music is his only studio album in the language. Some of its songs were also recorded as singles in English. Donna Summer sung backing vocals uncredited on "Hilf Dir Selbst".

== Track listing ==
1. "Marrakesch" (Moroder, Pete Bellotte, Hans-Ulrich Prost) - 4:04
2. "Viel Glück, Christina [Good Grief Christina]" (Moroder, Michael Holm) - 3:52
3. "Her Mit Dem Geld [Give me the Money]" (Moroder, Prost) - 3:30
4. "Viele Phrasen [Crippled Words]" (Moroder, Prost) - 3:33
5. "Zigaretten Und Mädchen Und Wein [Cigarettes, Women and Wine]" (Moroder, Michael Kunze) - 3:11
6. "Hilf Dir Selbst [Heaven Helps The Man (Who Helps Himself)]" (Moroder) - 3:07
7. "Ich Komm Nach Haus [I'm Coming Home]" (Moroder, Prost) - 4:11
8. "Nostalgie" (Moroder, Bellotte, Prost) - 3:19
9. "Ja, Ja, Ja (Wie Ist Werbung Wunderbar) [Yes, yes, yes (How is advertising wonderful)]" (Moroder, Prost) - 3:08
10. "Eine Alte Melodie [Lonely Lovers Symphony]" (Moroder, Prost) - 4:55
