= Son of My Father (Giorgio Moroder album) =

Studio album by Giorgio Moroder
- Released: 1972
- Recorded: 1972
- Genre: Pop; rock; psychedelic rock
- Label: Hansa
- Producer: Giorgio Moroder

Giorgio Moroder chronology
Giorgio (1970)	Son of My Father (1972)	Giorgio's Music (1973)

Singles from Son of My Father
- 1. "Underdog / Watch Your Step" Released: 1971; 2. "I'm Free Now / Son Of My Father" Released: 1971; 3. "London Traffic / Everybody Join Hands" Released: 1972; 4. "Son Of My Father / Underdog" Released: 1972; 5. "Son Of My Father (part 1) / Son Of My Father (part 2)" Released: 1972; 6. "Today's A Tomorrow (You Worried 'Bout Yesterday) / Pauline" Released: 1972; 7. "Take It, Shake It, Break My Heart / Spanish Disaster" Released: 1972

Son of My Father is a 1972 album composed, produced and performed by Giorgio Moroder. The tracks "Tears", "Underdog", and "Son of My Father" appeared in the 1972 film Die Klosterschülerinnen, for which Moroder also composed the score.

"Son of My Father" was later covered and popularized by the English pop group Chicory Tip.

Shirocco later reworked a version of "Tears" with vocals and released it as "Es War Nur Ein Traum".

The track "Automation" appeared in the 1972 film Oswalt Kolle: Liebe als Gesellschaftsspiel.

== Track listing ==
1. "Son of My Father" (Giorgio Moroder, Pete Bellotte, Michael Holm) – 3:42
2. "Lord (Release Me)" (Moroder, Bellotte) – 3:41
3. "That's How I See Her" (Moroder, Bellotte) – 3:13
4. "Pauline" (Moroder, Bellotte) – 2:54
5. "Automation" (Moroder, Bellotte) – 4:12
6. "London Traffic" (Moroder, Bellotte) – 3:49
7. "Underdog" (Moroder) – 3:53
8. "Spanish Disaster" (Moroder, Bellotte) – 5:00
9. "Watch Your Step" (Moroder) – 3:24
10. "Tears" (Moroder, Fred Daysenhof) – 2:20

=== Re-release bonus tracks ===
1. "Today's A Tomorrow" (Single) (Moroder, Bellotte) – 3:45 ^
2. "I'm Free Now" (Single) (Fausto Leali, Luciana Medini, Morris) – 2:54
3. "Tu Sei Mio Padre" (Italian Version of "Son Of My Father") (Single) (Moroder, Bellotte, Holm, Oscar Avogadro) – 3:20
4. "Non Ci Sto" (Italian Version of "Underdog") (Single) (Moroder, Bellotte, Holm, Avogadro) – 3:17
5. "Take It, Shake It, Break My Heart" (Single) (Moroder, Bellotte) – 3:19
6. "Everybody Join Hands" (Single) (Moroder, Bellotte) – 4:15
7. "Son Of My Father" (Part 1) (Mono Version) (Single) (Moroder, Bellotte, Holm) – 3:46
8. "Underdog" (Mono Version) (Single) (Moroder) – 3:54
9. "Watch Your Step" (Mono Version) (Single) (Moroder) – 3:22
10. "Son Of My Father" (Part 2 - Instrumental) (Mono Version) (Single) (Moroder, Bellotte, Holm) – 3:20

^ "Today's a Tomorrow" was also included on certain original (1972) releases of the album

== Personnel ==
Recorded at Giorgio's Musicland Studios

- Engineered by Giorgio Moroder and G. Zipelius
- Arranged and directed by Giorgio Moroder; Co-ordinated by Pete Bellotte
- Drums and percussion: Keith Forsey
- Guitars: Paul Vincent, Giorgio Moroder, Pete Bellotte.
- Keyboards: Max Gregor Jr., F. B. Mushler
- Bass: F. B. Mushler
- Moog: F. B. Mushler, Giorgio Moroder
- Background vocals: Giorgio and Friends
- Giorgio Moroder - Guitar and Synths
