= Tron RUN/r =

2016 video game

- Developer: Sanzaru Games
- Publisher: Disney Interactive Studios
- Series: TRON
- Engine: Unreal Engine 4
- Platforms: PlayStation 4, Windows, Xbox One
- Release: WW: February 17, 2016
- Genre: Endless runner
- Mode: Single-player

Tron RUN/r is an endless runner video game developed by Sanzaru Games and published by Disney Interactive Studios as part of the Tron franchise. It was released on February 16, 2016, for the PlayStation 4, Windows, and Xbox One. The game was announced at the Game Awards 2015, where it was described as an "action arcade" game.

== Soundtrack ==
The soundtrack was written and composed by Giorgio Moroder and Raney Shockne. It was released on May 31, 2016, and included remixes from Autechre, Plaid, Rusko, Bibio, Darkstar, patten and Christopher Nicholls; most of these artists are associated with the record label Warp.

== Reception ==
Reception

Aggregate score
Aggregator	Score
Metacritic	PS4: 64/100

Critical reception for Tron RUN/r has been mixed and the game currently holds a rating of 64 on Metacritic based on 9 reviews, indicating "mixed or average reviews".
