= Chasing Tail =

Chasing Tail is an American television reality TV show airing on The History Channel. It follows pest control specialists in Connecticut trying to control deer populations. The first episodes aired in April 2013.
