= That's Bubblegum – That's Giorgio =

Studio album by Giorgio Moroder
- Released: 1969
- Recorded: 1969
- Genre: Bubblegum pop
- Label: Hansa
- Producer: Giorgio Moroder

Giorgio Moroder chronology
That's Bubblegum – That's Giorgio (1969)	Giorgio (1970)

Singles from That's Bubblegum – That's Giorgio
- 1. "Yummy, Yummy, Yummy / Make Me Your Baby" Released: 1968; 2. "Looky, Looky / Happy Birthday" Released: 1969

That's Bubble Gum – That's Giorgio is the 1969 debut studio album by Italian producer Giorgio Moroder. The album contains the song "Looky, Looky" which was the first hit for Moroder; it was released as a single under the mononymous name "Giorgio".

== Track listing ==
1. "Looky, Looky" (Moroder, Peter Rainford) – 2:42
2. "Mendocino" (Doug Sahm, Michael Holm) – 3:20
3. "Mercy" (Joey Levine, Steve Feldman) – 2:12
4. "Make Me Your Baby" (Moroder, Fred Jay) – 4:24
5. "Sorry Suzanne" (Geoff Stephens, Tony Macaulay) – 4:54
6. "Yummy, Yummy, Yummy" (Joey Levine, Arthur Resnick) – 2:18
7. "Bad Moon Rising" (John Fogerty) – 2:20
8. "Proud Mary" (John Fogerty) – 2:58
9. "Aquarius/Let the Sunshine In" (James Rado, Gerome Ragni, Galt MacDermot) – 4:28
10. "Muny, Muny, Muny" (Joachim Heider, Michael Holm) – 3:02
11. "Gimme Gimme Good Lovin'" (Joey Levine, Ritchie Cordell) – 2:07
