= From Here to Eternity (Giorgio Moroder album) =

Studio album by Giorgio Moroder
- Released: 22 July 1977
- Recorded: June 1977
- Studio: Musicland Studios (Munich, West Germany)
- Genre: Eurodisco; disco
- Length: 30:44
- Label: Casablanca
- Producer: Giorgio Moroder

Giorgio Moroder chronology
Knights in White Satin (1976)	From Here to Eternity (1977)	Love's in You, Love's in Me (1978)

Singles from From Here to Eternity
- 1. "From Here to Eternity" Released: 1977

From Here to Eternity is a 1977 studio album by Italian producer Giorgio Moroder. It peaked at number 130 on the Billboard 200 chart. The album's title track peaked at number 16 on the UK Singles Chart.

== Critical reception ==
Professional ratings
Review scores
Source	Rating
AllMusic	4.5/5 stars
Pitchfork	8.6/10

John Bush of AllMusic said: "The metallic beats, high-energy impact, and futuristic effects prove that Moroder was ahead of his time like few artists of the 1970s (Kraftwerk included), and the free-form songwriting on tracks like 'Lost Angeles', 'First Hand Experience in Second Hand Love', and the title track are priceless." Dominique Leone of Pitchfork gave the album an 8.6 out of 10, calling it "a marvel for disco historians" and "a perfect nugget of dance music for anyone else".

In 2004, Pitchfork placed it at number 88 on the "Top 100 Albums of the 1970s" list. In 2015, Thump placed it at number 19 on the "99 Greatest Dance Albums of All Time" list.

== Track listing ==
All tracks are written by Giorgio Moroder and Pete Bellotte.

No.	Title	Length
1.	"From Here to Eternity"	5:58
2.	"Faster than the Speed of Love"	1:54
3.	"Lost Angeles"	2:44
4.	"Utopia - Me Giorgio"	3:24
5.	"From Here to Eternity (Reprise)"	1:45
6.	"First Hand Experience in Second Hand Love"	5:02
7.	"I'm Left, You're Right, She's Gone"	5:08
8.	"Too Hot to Handle"	4:51

2013 reissue CD version bonus track
No.	Title	Length
9.	"From Here to Eternity" (Single version)	3:52

== Personnel ==
Credits adapted from liner notes.

- Giorgio Moroder – writing, production, electronic keyboards, engineering
- Pete Bellotte – writing, mystery voice
- Robby Wedel – Moog programming
- Gitte – backing vocals
- Lucy – backing vocals
- Betsy – backing vocals
- Juergen Koppers – engineering
- Phyllis Chotin – art direction
- Henry Vizcarra – art direction, design
- Gribbitt! – art direction, design
- Ronald Slenzak – photography

== Equipment used ==
- Roland MC-8 Microcomposer – sequencer
- Roland System 700 – synthesizer
- Moog Polymoog – synthesizer
- EMS vocoder 3000
- ARP/Solina String Ensemble

== Charts ==
Chart (1977)	Peak position
Australian (Kent Music Report)	68
Austrian Albums (Ö3 Austria)	20
US Billboard 200	130
