= Chase (instrumental) =

1978 electronic instrumental by Giorgio Moroder

Single by Giorgio Moroder

from the album Midnight Express: Music from the Original Motion Picture Soundtrack
- B-side: "Love's Theme"; "Istanbul Blues"; "(Theme From) Midnight Express"
- Released: 1978
- Recorded: 1978
- Genre: Eurodisco; italo disco; electropop
- Length: 13:06 (maxi single); 8:26 (LP version); 3:38 (single version)
- Label: Casablanca
- Songwriter: Giorgio Moroder
- Producer: Giorgio Moroder

Giorgio Moroder singles chronology
| "Let the Music Play" (1977) | "Chase" (1978) | "E=MC2" (1979) |

"Chase" (also known as "The Chase") is an instrumental composition by Italian music producer Giorgio Moroder. It was released as a single by Casablanca Records during 1978 from his Academy Award-winning soundtrack album Midnight Express (1978), and was a disco instrumental that was subsequently extended and released as a maxi single. It made the US Billboard Hot 100 in January 1979, peaking at number 33, and the UK Singles Chart, peaking at number 48.

== Background ==
Created especially for the film Midnight Express, Alan Parker, the director of the film, explicitly asked Moroder for a song in the style of "I Feel Love", which Moroder composed for Donna Summer. It was Moroder's second time composing a movie soundtrack after his work on 1972's German softcore sex film "Sex Life in a Convent". The song's main melody was played on a Roland SH-2000 synthesizer, while the bass lines were played on a Minimoog synthesizer. The track also has a flanging effect produced by the MXR Flanger, while other instruments used include an ARP/Solina String Ensemble, Fender Rhodes, Hohner Clavinet, and piano.

Although a disco piece, "Chase", along with "I Feel Love", is more specifically considered the pioneering introduction of the hi-NRG genre, which came to prominence in the early 1980s. The music was arranged by Harold Faltermeyer under the leadership of Giorgio Moroder.

== Reception ==
In 2016, Pitchfork named it the 175th best song of the 1970s, saying, "Any time someone describes a piece of music as 'cinematic,' there’s a decent chance they’re thinking, consciously or subconsciously, of 'Chase'. It's impossible to overstate, let alone list, the amount of composers and films who've ripped off 'Chase'." In 2019, Spin ranked it among "The 30 Best Disco Songs That Every Millennial Should Know".

== Track listing ==
- Casablanca — NBD 20146 — single-sided 12"

Side A
| No. | Title | Length |
|---|---|---|
| 1. | "Chase" | 13:06 |

- Casablanca — NBD 956 — 7" single

Side A
| No. | Title | Length |
|---|---|---|
| 1. | "Chase" | 3:38 |

Side B
| No. | Title | Length |
|---|---|---|
| 1. | "Love's Theme" | 3:20 |

== Charts ==
Original version

| Chart (1979) | Peak position |
|---|---|
| Australia (Kent Music Report) | 26 |
| Canada Top Singles (RPM) | 41 |
| Italy (Musica e Dischi) | 18 |
| UK Singles (OCC) | 48 |
| US Billboard Hot 100 | 33 |

Giorgio Moroder vs. Jam & Spoon version

| Chart (2000) | Peak position |
|---|---|
| Canada Dance/Urban (RPM) | 14 |
| Germany (GfK) | 44 |
| Italy (FIMI) | 25 |
| Netherlands (Single Top 100) | 68 |
| Switzerland (Schweizer Hitparade) | 44 |
| UK Singles (OCC) | 46 |
