= Spinach 1 =

Studio album by Giorgio Moroder and Michael Holm
- Released: 1973
- Recorded: 1973
- Genre: Rock and roll
- Label: Canyon Records (Original release); Repertoire Records (2003 CD)
- Producer: Giorgio Moroder, Michael Holm, Rainer Pietsch

Giorgio Moroder chronology
Giorgio's Music (1972)	Spinach 1 (1973)	Einzelgänger (1975)

Singles from Spinach 1
- 1. "America, America / Rhythm Of Love" Released: 1971; 2. "Action Man (part 1) / Action Man (part 2)" Released: 1971; 3. "(Sweet Sixteen) You Know What I Mean / Knockin' On Your Door" Released: 1972; 4. " Looky, Looky / I'm A Bum" Released: 1973

Spinach 1 is a 1973 album composed, produced and performed by Giorgio Moroder and Michael Holm under the moniker "Spinach".

== Track listing ==
1. "America, America" (Giorgio Moroder, Michael Holm) - 3:33
2. "Rhythm of Love" (Holm, Moroder) - 2:19
3. "Action Man (Part 1)" (Holm, Moroder) - 3:59
4. "Knockin' On Your Door" (Holm, Moroder) - 3:16
5. "(Sweet Sixteen) You Know What I Mean" (Holm, Moroder) - 4:19
6. "Action Man (Part 2)" (Holm, Moroder) - 3:51
7. "Looky, Looky" (Moroder, Peter Rainford) - 2:30
8. "Don't You Worry" (Tom Winter, Abi Ofarim) - 2:30
9. "I'm a Bum" (Heinz Krebs, Andreas Neumann) - 2:41
10. "Sunny Mornin'" (Rainer Pietsch, Cannon, Holm) - 3:21
11. "Sunshine Lady" (Pietsch) - 3:45
12. "Muny, Muny" (Holm, Joachim Heider) - 3:04
