= Suzi Lane =

American singer

Suzi Lane is an American female singer and model noted for her 1979 hit disco song "Harmony" / "Ooh, La La".

Lane was born Suzilienne McDonald. She adopted the name Suzi Lane prior to the release of her debut album Ooh, La, La. The album was produced by Giorgio Moroder who was also producing Donna Summer at that time. Lane said she met Summer at the recording studio and that she was influenced by the "high-energy electronica" sound pioneered by Moroder and Summer. The title track along with the song "Harmony" reached number one on Billboard magazine's Hot Dance Music/Club Play chart. The dance hit was number one for one week then remained on the chart for six months.

Soon after the release of the album, Lane was involved in a car accident in which her face was seriously injured by the broken windshield. Lane spent three years in seclusion at her home in Las Vegas recuperating. In New York, while visiting her sisters who worked as fashion models, Lane was spotted at a photo shoot for Essence magazine. She subsequently was represented by Ford Modeling and had contracts with Lane Bryant and Hanes.

== See also ==
- List of number-one dance hits (United States)
- List of artists who reached number one on the US Dance chart
