= Chris Bennett (musician) =

American jazz musician

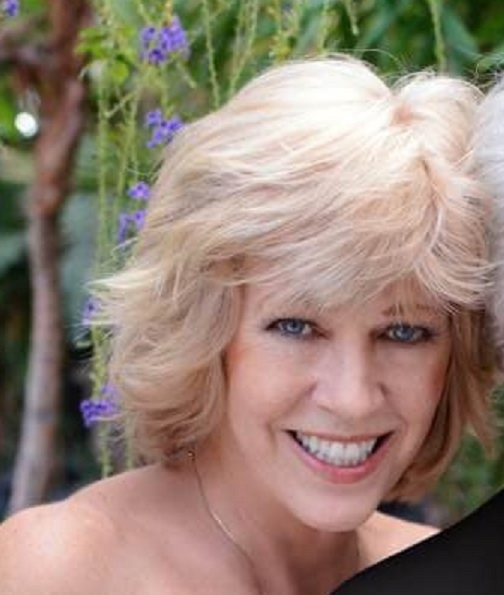
Chris Bennett in 2020

Chris Bennett is an American jazz singer and songwriter.

Bennett was born in Marshall, Illinois. She graduated from the University of Illinois.

She has collaborated with Tina Turner, The Manhattan Transfer, Giorgio Moroder, Donna Summer, The Three Degrees, Sparks and Keb Mo. Bennett's Grammy nomination was for "The Theme from Midnight Express", her contribution to the Midnight Express movie soundtrack. Bennett's 2010 album Sail Away - The Tahiti Sessions was produced by Bennett and Eric Doney and recorded on the island of Tahiti. The album includes a live string ensemble.

== Discography ==
- Love's in You, Love's in Me with Giorgio Moroder (Casablanca, 1978)
- A Whiter Shade of Pale by Munich Machine with Chris Bennett (Casablanca, 1978)
- Chris Bennett (Beachwood, 1993)
- Less Is More (Chartmaker, 1998)
- Live in Berlin (Renegade, 2000)
- Until the End of Time (Rhombus, 2001)
- When I Think of Christmas (Rhombus, 2003)
- Once Upon a Time: Live at the A-Trane (Renegade, 2005)
- Chris Bennett on Broadway (Rhombus, 2005)
- Girl Talk (Chris Bennett, 2008)
- Sail Away (Renegade, 2012)
- Something Wonderful with Bill Marx (2018)
