= Giorgio Moroder =

Italian composer and music producer (born 1940)

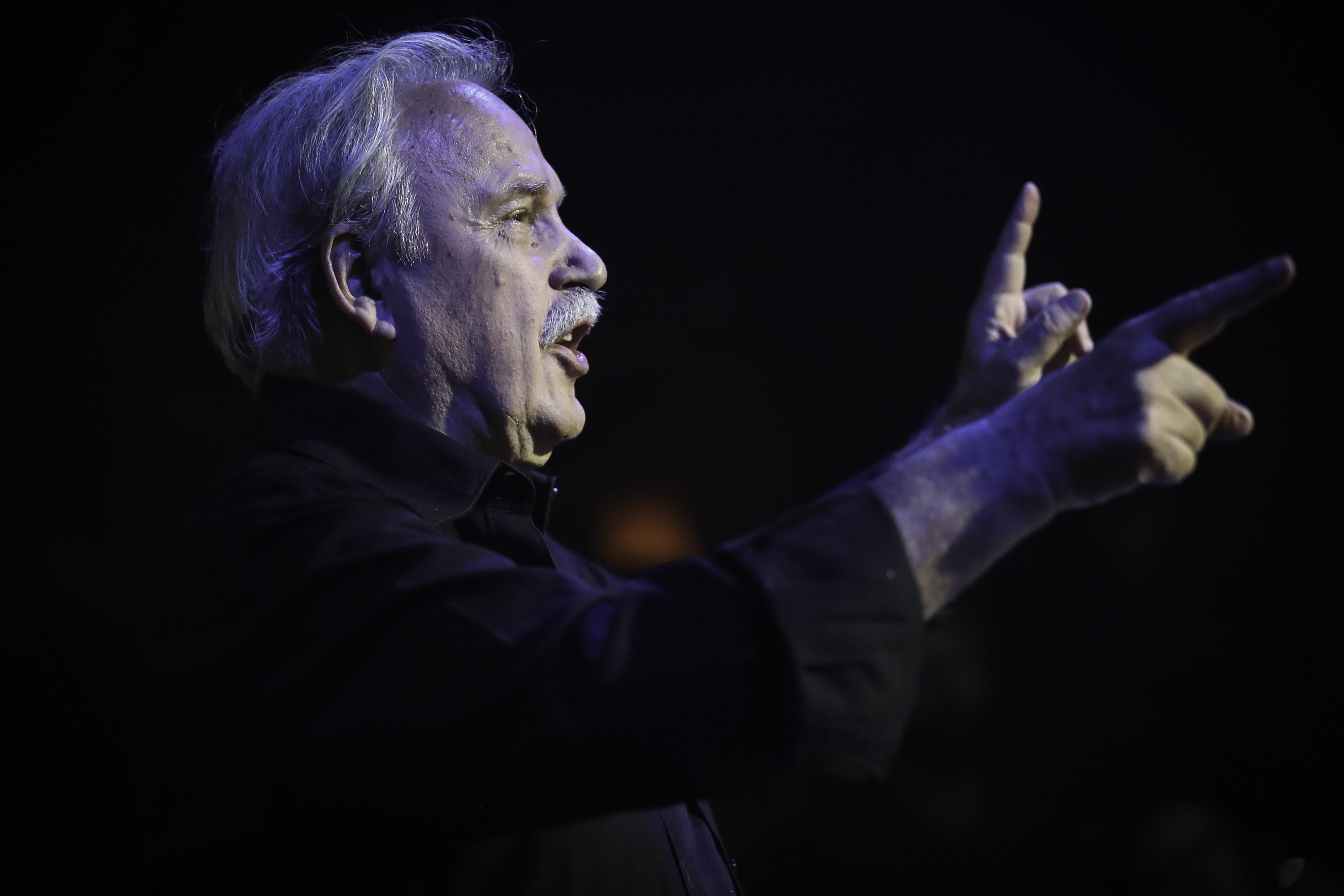
- Moroder at First Avenue, Minneapolis, in 2018

Background information
- Born: Giovanni Giorgio Moroder; 26 April 1940 (age 86); Urtijëi, South Tyrol, Italy
- Genre: Euro disco
- Occupations: Composer; record producer
- Works: Discography
- Years active: 1958–present
- Labels: London; Oasis; Casablanca; Hansa; RCA; Virgin
- Spouse: Francisca Gutiérrez (m. 1990; died 2022)
- Website: giorgiomoroder.com

Giovanni Giorgio Moroder (Italian: [dʒoˈvanni ˈdʒordʒo moˈrɔːder], Austrian German: [mɔˈroːdɐ]; born 26 April 1940) is an Italian composer and music producer. Dubbed the "Father of Disco", Moroder is credited with pioneering Euro disco and electronic dance music. His work with synthesizers had a significant influence on several music genres such as hi-NRG, Italo disco, synth-pop, new wave, house, and techno music.

While in Munich in the 1970s, Moroder started Oasis Records, later a subdivision of Casablanca Records. He is the founder of the former Musicland Studios in Munich, a recording studio used by many artists including the Rolling Stones, Donna Summer, Electric Light Orchestra, Led Zeppelin, Deep Purple, Deborah Harry, Queen, and Elton John. He produced singles for Donna Summer during the mid-to-late 1970s disco era, including "Love to Love You Baby", "I Feel Love", "Last Dance", "MacArthur Park", "Hot Stuff", "Bad Girls", "Dim All the Lights", "No More Tears (Enough Is Enough)", and "On the Radio". During this period, he also released many albums, including the synthesizer-driven From Here to Eternity (1977) and E=MC^{2} (1979).

He began to compose film soundtracks and scores, including Midnight Express, American Gigolo, Superman III, Scarface, The NeverEnding Story, and the 1984 restoration of Metropolis. Moroder's work on the film Midnight Express (1978), which contained the international hit "Chase", won him the Academy Award for Best Original Score and the Golden Globe Award for Best Original Score. Along with British singer and composer Philip Oakey, he composed the titular track "Together in Electric Dreams" for the film Electric Dreams (1984), which reached No. 3 on the singles chart in the UK and top five in Australia. He also produced a number of electronic disco songs for the Three Degrees and two albums for Sparks, Number 1 in Heaven in 1979 and Terminal Jive the following year. In 1990, he composed "Un'estate italiana", the official theme song of the 1990 FIFA World Cup.

Moroder has created songs for many performers including David Bowie, Falco, The Weeknd, Kylie Minogue, Irene Cara, Bonnie Tyler, Janet Jackson, Madleen Kane, Melissa Manchester, Blondie, Japan, Sabrina Salerno and France Joli. Moroder has stated that the work of which he is most proud is Berlin's "Take My Breath Away", which earned him the Academy Award for Best Original Song and the Golden Globe Award for Best Original Song after appearing in the film Top Gun in 1986; he had earned the same awards in 1983 for "Flashdance... What a Feeling" (as well as the Golden Globe Award for Best Original Score for all of his work on Flashdance). In addition to the three Academy Awards and four Golden Globes, Moroder has also received four Grammy Awards, two People's Choice Awards, and more than 100 Golden and Platinum discs. In 2004, he was inducted into the Dance Music Hall of Fame.

== Early life ==
Giovanni Giorgio Moroder was born to Ladin parents on 26 April 1940 in Urtijëi, South Tyrol, Italy. His father was a hotel concierge. He has three brothers, one of whom is artist Ulrich Moroder. Moroder grew up in a mixed Ladin-, Italian- and German-speaking environment in South Tyrol, with his mother calling him Hansjörg (pronounced [ˈhansjœrɡ]), a German version of his two first names.

== Career ==
=== 1963–1968: Early career ===
Moroder began teaching himself to play the guitar at age 15, inspired by Paul Anka's "Diana". At age 18, he began touring Europe as a professional musician. He performed at night, and during the day, made recordings with two Revox tape recorders. Moroder made his first steps in music in the Scotch Club in Aachen and then released a few singles under the name "Giorgio" beginning in 1963 after moving to Berlin, singing in Italian, Spanish, English, and German. Around age 25, he moved in with his aunt in Berlin, where he worked as an audio engineer. Ricky Shayne's single "Ich sprenge alle Ketten" ("I bust all the chains"), composed by the then-unknown Moroder and Michael Holm, became a German hit. His second hit was his and Holm's cover version of "Mendocino" by the Sir Douglas Quintet. After two years in Berlin, Moroder moved to Munich in 1968.

=== 1969–1983: Contribution to electronic music ===
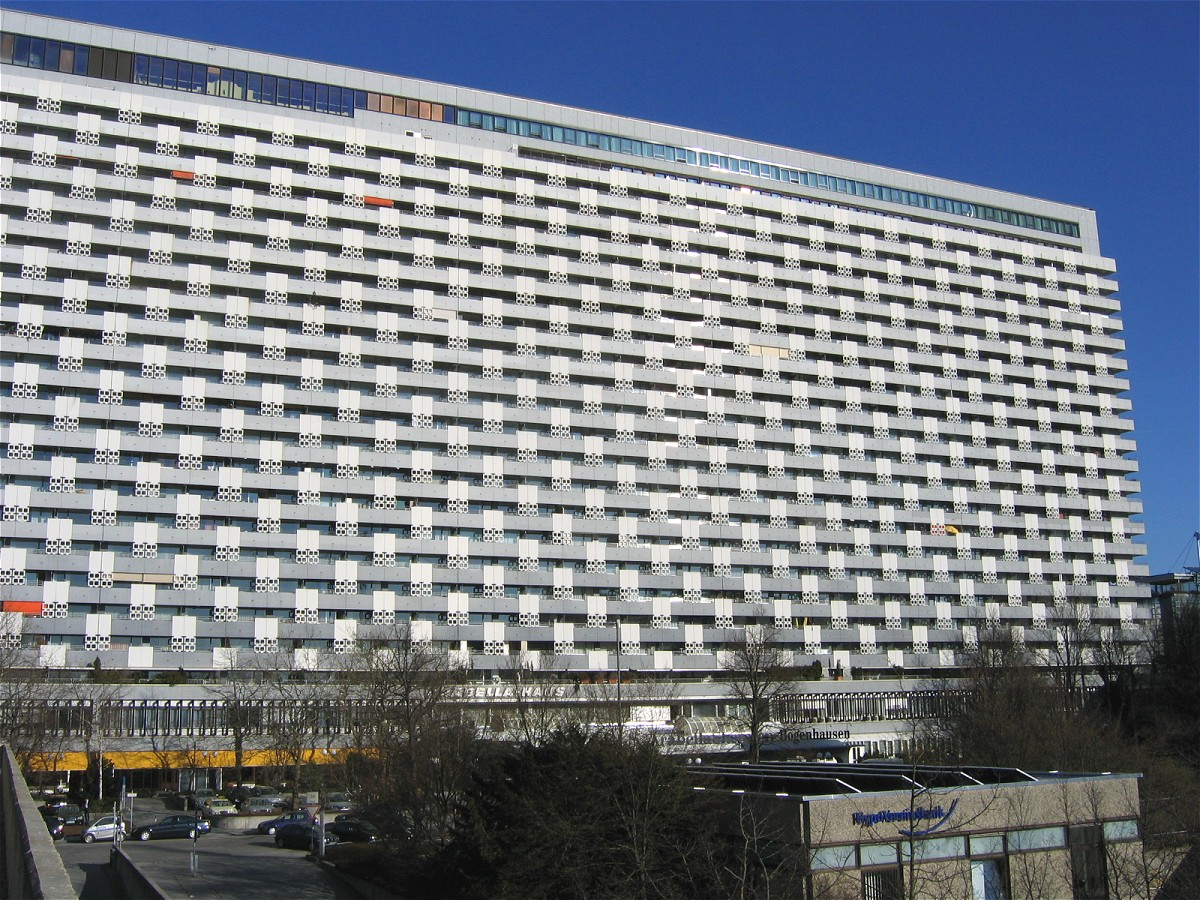
Moroder's Musicland Studios was located in the basement of the pictured Arabella Hochhaus high-rise building.

Moroder's 1969 single "Looky Looky" was awarded a gold disc in 1970. He then founded the Musicland Studios in Munich in the early 1970s. Moroder first incorporated synthesizers into his work during the making of his album Son of My Father (1972), on which he used a Moog synthesizer. Often collaborating with lyricist Pete Bellotte, Moroder had a number of hits in his own name, including "Son of My Father" (later a 1972 No. 1 hit in the UK for Chicory Tip), before releasing the synthesizer-driven album From Here to Eternity, a chart hit in 1977. That same year he co-wrote and produced Donna Summer's Moog-driven "I Feel Love", the first track in the Hi-NRG genre. The following year he released "Chase", the theme from the film Midnight Express. These songs achieved some chart success in the United Kingdom, the United States and across Europe, and disco-mania was spreading. Midnight Express and "Chase" brought him an Academy Award for Best Original Score in 1979.

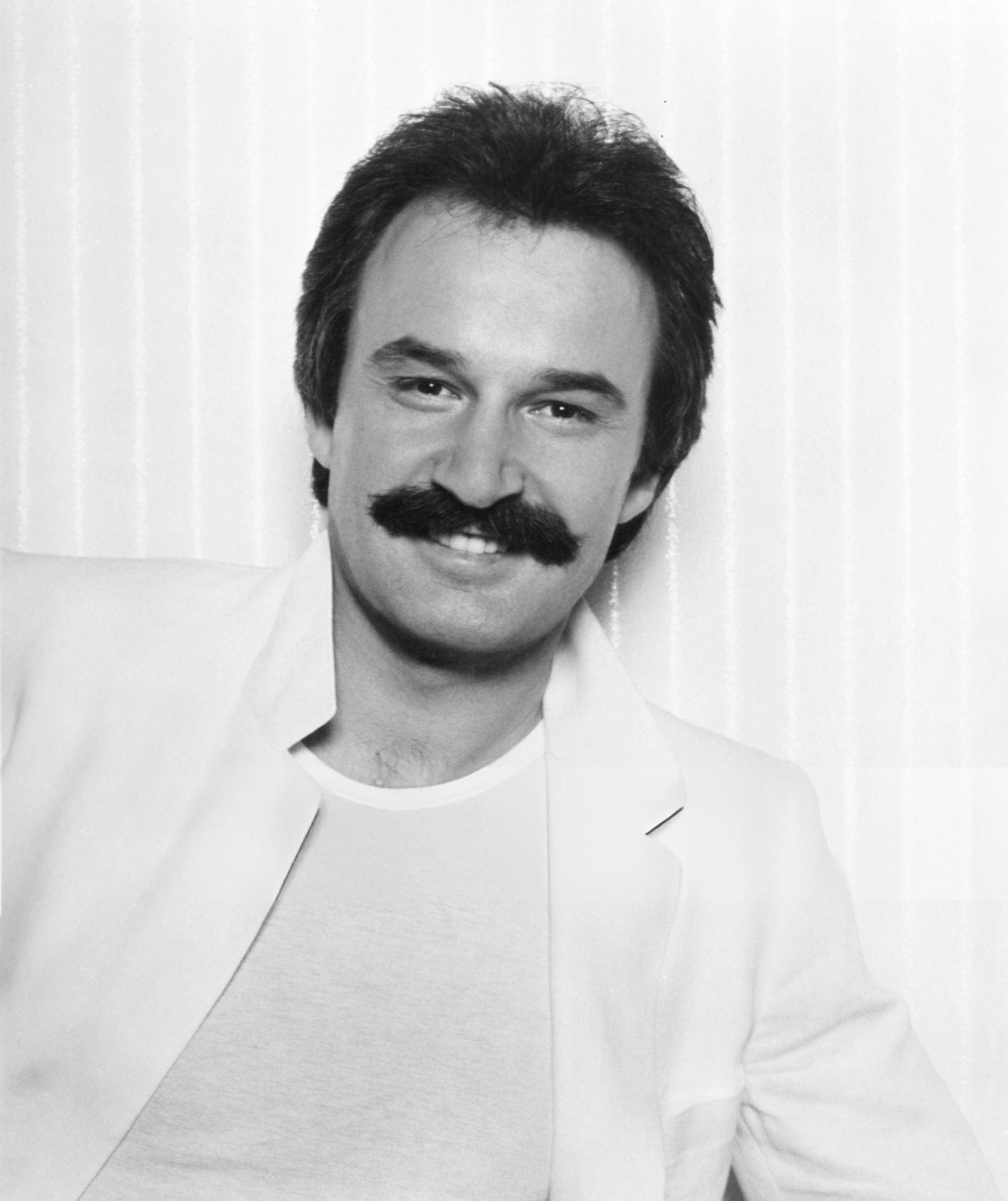
Moroder in 1979

Moroder released E=MC² in 1979. He released three albums between 1977 and 1979 under the name Munich Machine, the first of which remade several songs originally recorded by Donna Summer. He produced Sparks' album Number 1 in Heaven in 1979. Sparks hadn't made any synthesizer-based music before this album but they were inspired by the sound of Donna Summer's "I Feel Love" and sought out Moroder to produce them. He also produced their following album in 1980, Terminal Jive. He composed and produced two film soundtrack albums: the first for Foxes, and the second for American Gigolo (both 1980). A double album of the Foxes soundtrack was released on the disco label Casablanca Records, which includes Donna Summer's hit single "On the Radio", which Moroder produced and co-wrote. The Foxes soundtrack contains a song titled "Bad Love", written and performed by Cher and produced by Moroder. The American Gigolo soundtrack featured "Call Me" by Blondie, a US and UK number one hit which Moroder co-wrote and produced. The combined club play of the album's tracks was number two for five weeks on the disco/dance charts.

Moroder wrote the soundtrack of the film Cat People (1982), including the hit single "Cat People (Putting Out Fire)" featuring David Bowie, and produced the soundtrack for the film Scarface (1983). During its initial release, the album was only available in a few countries and strictly through import in the United States. Moroder-produced tracks included "Scarface (Push It to the Limit)" by Paul Engemann, "Rush Rush" by Debbie Harry and "She's on Fire" by Amy Holland.

=== 1984–1993: Recognition and hiatus ===
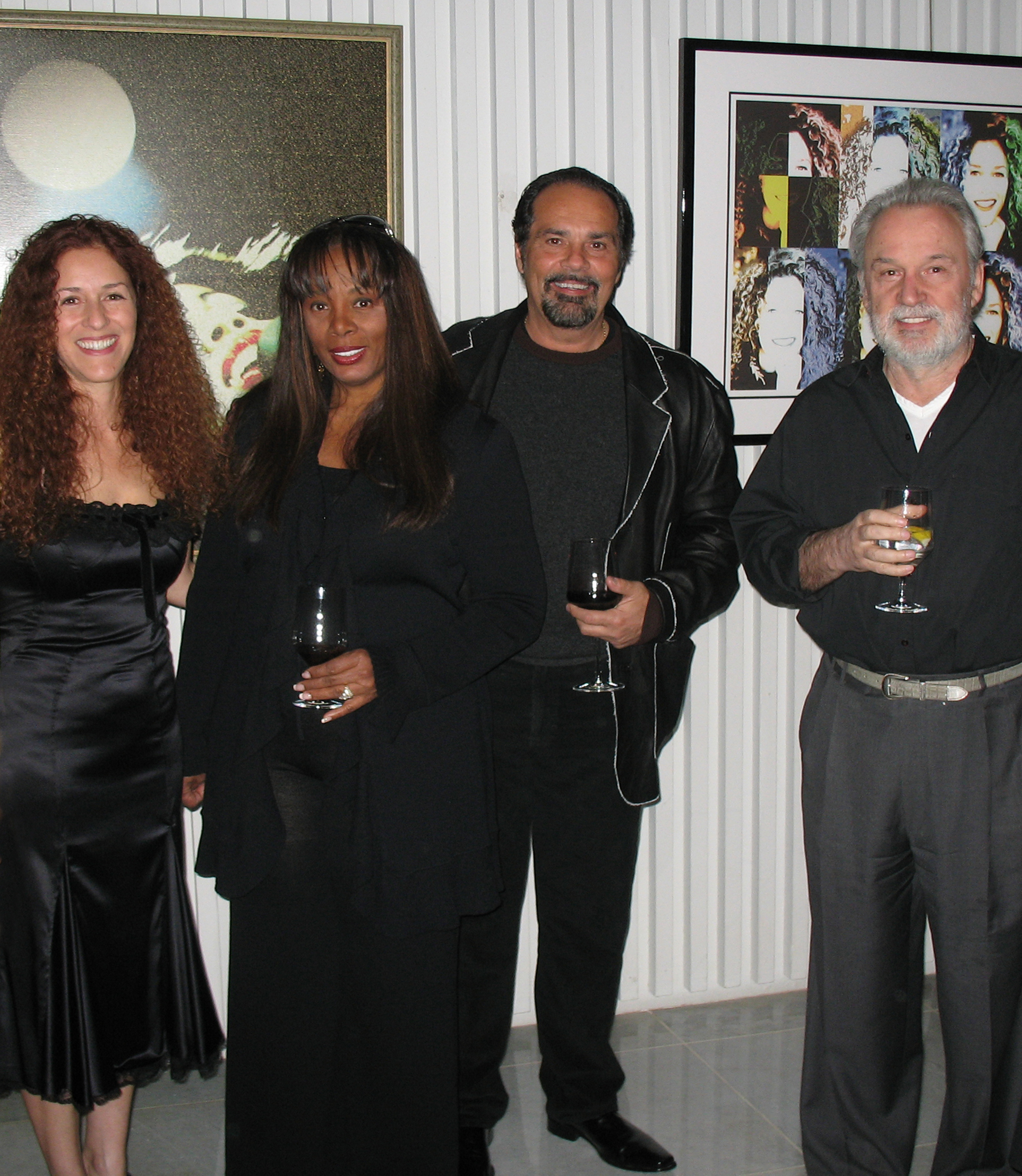
Moroder with his longtime collaborator Donna Summer and her husband Bruce Sudano. On the left is Moroder's wife Francisca Gutierrez.

In 1984, Moroder compiled a new restoration and edit of the silent film Metropolis (1927) and provided it with a contemporary soundtrack. This soundtrack includes seven pop music tracks from Pat Benatar, Jon Anderson, Adam Ant, Billy Squier, Loverboy, Bonnie Tyler and Freddie Mercury. He integrated the original intertitles into the film as subtitles as a means of improving continuity. Since the original speed was unknown, this choice was controversial. Known as the "Moroder version", it sparked debate in film circles, with outspoken critics and supporters falling into equal camps. Most critics agree that, the opinion of film purists aside, Moroder's version was a welcome addition. In 1984, Moroder worked with Philip Oakey of the Human League to make the album Philip Oakey & Giorgio Moroder, which was a UK singles chart hit with "Together in Electric Dreams", the title track to the 1984 film Electric Dreams. The same year saw him collaborating with Kajagoogoo frontman Limahl for his worldwide hit "The NeverEnding Story".

In 1986, Moroder collaborated with his protégé Harold Faltermeyer and lyricist Tom Whitlock to create the score for the film Top Gun (1986), which included Kenny Loggins' "Danger Zone" and Berlin's "Take My Breath Away". He wrote the theme song to the film Over the Top, "Meet Me Half Way", also performed by Loggins. In 1987, Moroder produced and co-wrote Falco's song "Body Next to Body". Moroder wrote the official theme songs, "Reach Out", for the 1984 Los Angeles Olympics, and "Hand in Hand", for the 1988 Seoul Olympics and "Un'estate italiana" for the 1990 FIFA World Cup. On 12 March 1992, Moroder released his fourteenth studio album, Forever Dancing, his last solo project for years and he began a long hiatus in 1993. For two decades he released no new albums, focusing largely on remixes and visual art during most of the 1990s and early 2000s. With Daniel Walker he produced a soundtrack for Leni Riefenstahl's last film Impressionen unter Wasser. His song Forever Friends was featured in the Olympic Games in Beijing 2008.

=== 2012–present: Return and collaborations ===
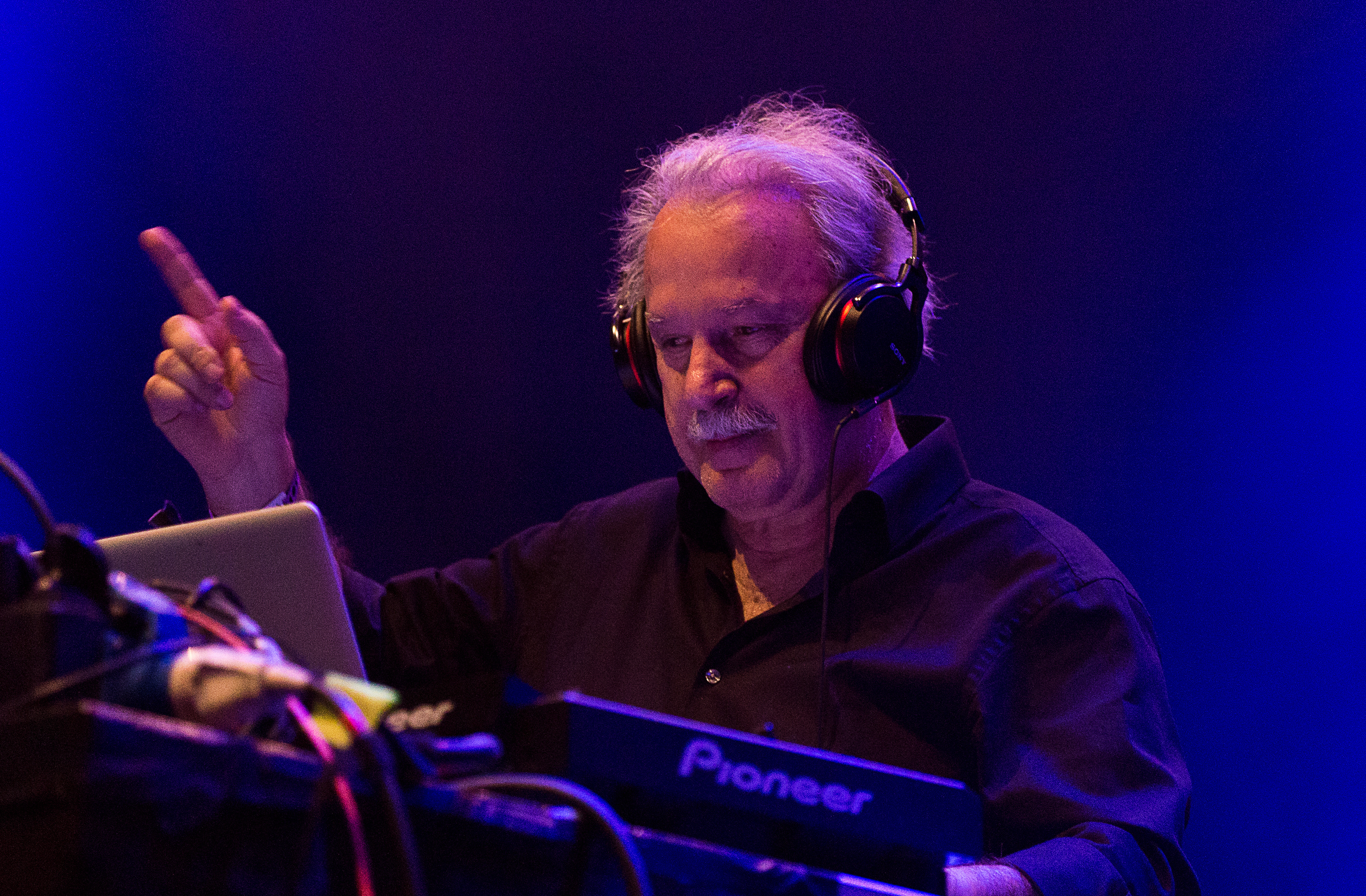
Moroder at Melt! Festival 2015

In 2013, Moroder returned to music with the soundtrack for Google's Racer: A Chrome Experiment Moroder contributed to Daft Punk's 2013 studio album Random Access Memories, stating that he was a fan of their song "One More Time" before working with the group; the album track "Giorgio by Moroder" incorporates an interview with Moroder. In the summer of 2013, he DJ'd at the Red Bull Music Academy in New York. In 2014, Moroder reworked an old classic from the 1960s called "Doo Bee Doo" (2014 version), which was used in the Volkswagen 2014 Super Bowl commercial, "Wings". He also announced that he was planning to work with electro-pop producer Madeon and American singer Lana Del Rey. On 9 June 2014, Adult Swim released a new Hi-NRG Disco single by Moroder (named "Giorgio's Theme"). Moroder also remixed Tony Bennett and Lady Gaga's rendition of "I Can't Give You Anything but Love". Moroder performed "Giorgio by Moroder" with the Heritage Orchestra at the Sydney Opera House during Vivid Sydney 2014.

Moroder's solo studio album, Déjà Vu, was released in 2015. It features collaborations with Kylie Minogue, Britney Spears, Sia, Charli XCX, Mikky Ekko, Foxes and Matthew Koma, among others. On 16 January, the collaboration with Kylie Minogue, "Right Here, Right Now", was leaked to the internet ahead of its official release. The song, along with a video teaser, was officially released on 20 January 2015 and on 18 April 2015 reached number one on the US Dance Club Songs, becoming Moroder's first chart-topper in 15 years. In March 2015, Moroder supported Minogue during the Australian leg of her Kiss Me Once Tour. Moroder and Sia collaborated in May 2015 on the title track from Moroder's LP Déjà Vu.

In September 2015, Moroder was featured on Kylie Minogue's EP Kylie + Garibay on the song "Your Body". In 2016, he and Raney Shockne wrote and composed the music to the video game Tron RUN/r. The soundtrack album was released on 31 May 2016. In October 2016, Moroder produced "One More Day" for Sistar, a Korean girl group. They debuted the song live on 8 October, at Korea's DMC Festival 2016, with Moroder being present in the audience. The music video for the song was released on 22 November, alongside the official digital release of the track. 2021 saw Moroder return to the studio with Duran Duran, co-writing and producing two tracks, "Tonight United" and "Beautiful Lies" for their 2021 album Future Past. In January 2025, Moroder co-produced and co-wrote The Weeknd's songs "Big Sleep" (which he is also credited as a performing artist on) and "Without a Warning" from the album Hurry Up Tomorrow, serving as a sonic influence on the entire album.

== Awards ==
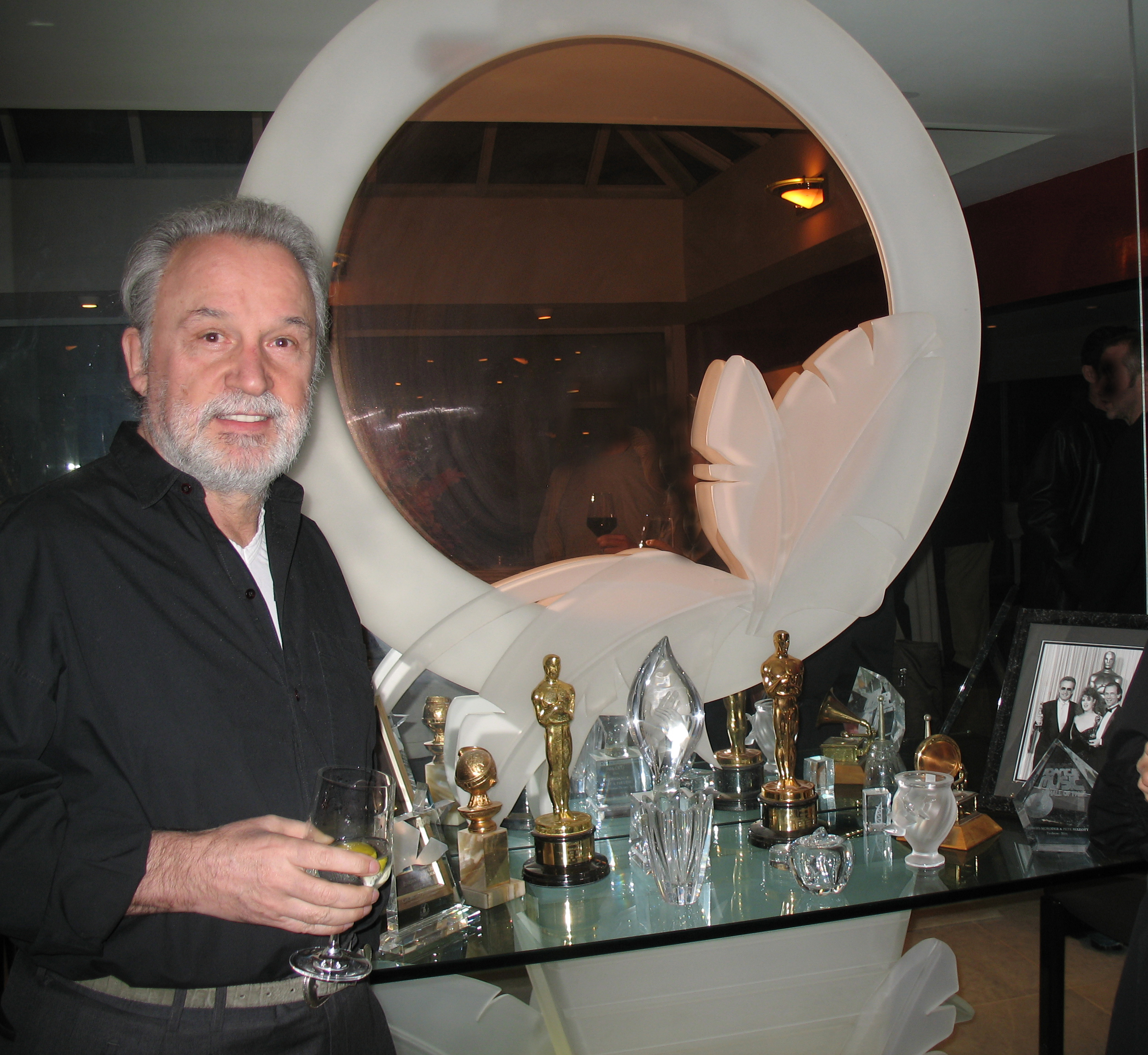
Moroder with some of his awards in 2007

Moroder has won three Academy Awards: Best Original Score for Midnight Express (1978); Best Song for "Flashdance...What a Feeling", from the film Flashdance (1983) and Best Song for "Take My Breath Away", from Top Gun (1986). Moroder also won two of his four Grammy Awards for Flashdance: Best Album or Original Score Written for a Motion Picture or a Television Special and Best Instrumental Composition for the track "Love Theme from Flashdance". The third was awarded for Best Dance Recording for the song "Carry On".

Moroder also won four Golden Globes: two Best Original Score for "Midnight Express" and "Flashdance", and two Best Original Song for "Flashdance... What a Feeling" and "Take My Breath Away".

On 20 September 2004, Moroder was honoured at the Dance Music Hall of Fame ceremony, held in New York, when he was inducted for his achievements and contributions as a producer. In 2005, Moroder was named a Commendatore Ordine al Merito della Repubblica Italiana, and in 2010 Bolzano awarded him the Grande Ordine al Merito della Provincia autonoma di Bolzano. In 2011, he was awarded the Lifetime Achievement Award by the World Soundtrack Academy. In 2014, Moroder won his fourth Grammy Award for Daft Punk's Random Access Memories (Album of the Year).

== Legacy ==
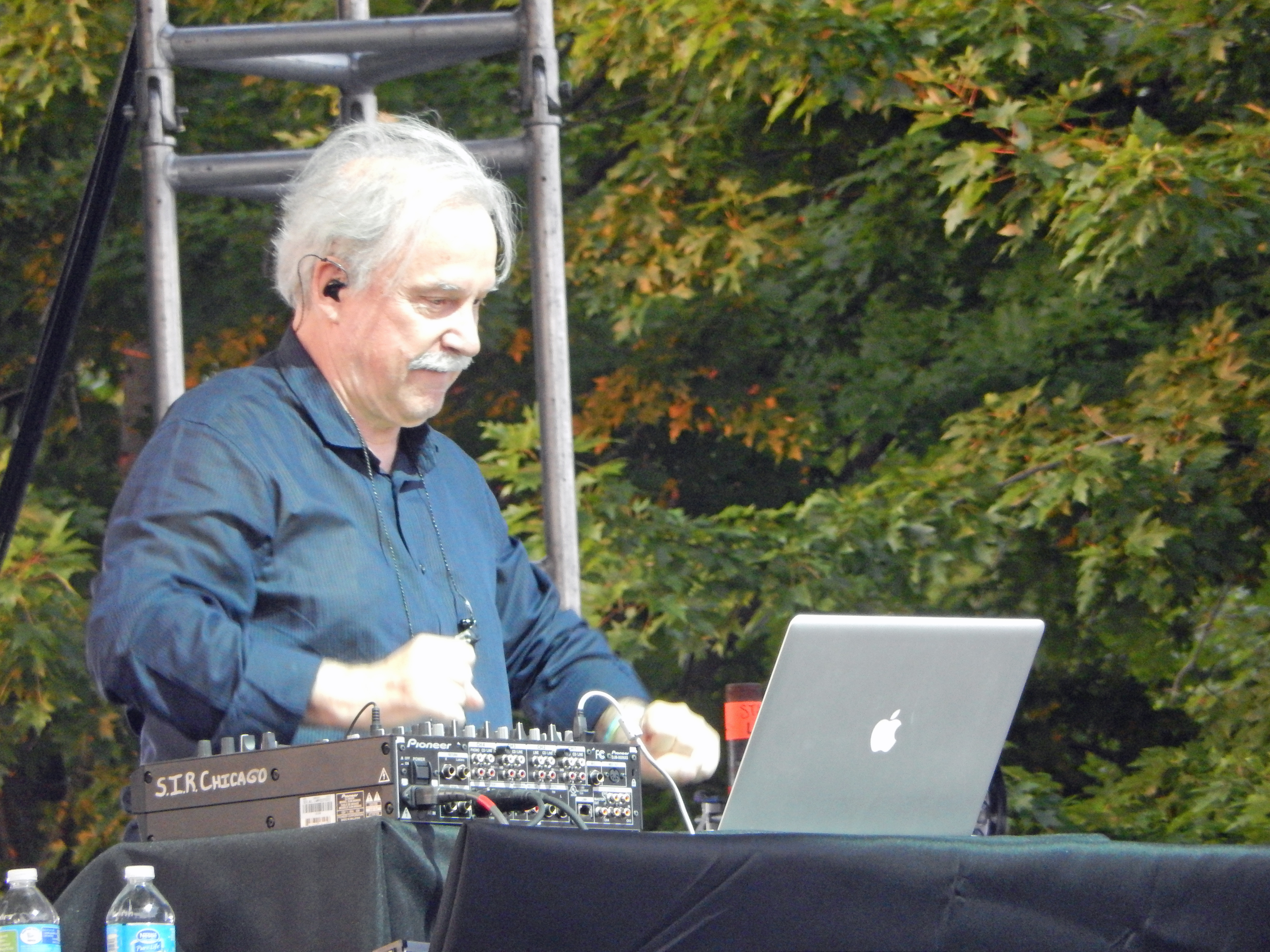
Moroder at Pitchfork Music Festival 2014

The British alternative rock duo Curve covered "I Feel Love" in 1992. The song was later included on the double CD compilation The Way of Curve, released in 2004. Bronski Beat covered "I Feel Love" and "Love to Love You Baby" for their debut album The Age of Consent (1984). "On Fire", the second single from rapper Lil Wayne's seventh studio album Rebirth, contains allusions from Amy Holland's song "She's on Fire" and was inspired in its entirety by Scarface. "Push It", the second single from rapper Rick Ross' debut album Port of Miami, samples "Scarface (Push It to the Limit)" and the story of the video has a very similar theme to the film Scarface. It was produced by J. R. Rotem.

His song "Tears" was sampled and used as the basis of the DJ Shadow song "Organ Donor" on his 1996 album Endtroducing...... Canadian hip hop group Swollen Members sampled the song in "Fuel Injected" and "Meltdown". It also appears on the song "Tragedy" by RZA. The main melody and chord progression form the basis of "Marz" by folk musician John Grant and "Only Light" by Australian ska band the Cat Empire. Hip hop duo Mobb Deep used a sample from the song "Tony's Theme" in their song "G.O.D. Pt. III". His song "E=MC²" was sampled and used for J. Dilla's song of the same title. One of his early compositions, "Doo-Bee-Doo-Bee-Doo" from 1969, was featured for many years in silent sketches on The Benny Hill Show as part of a medley that also included "Mah Nà Mah Nà", a 4/4 adaptation of Ludwig van Beethoven's "Für Elise", and "Gimme Dat Ding".

The theme from Midnight Express was sampled by hip-hop duo OutKast for their song "Return of the Gangsta", and by hip-hop producer J Dilla for "Phantom of the Synths", a beat later used by MF Doom for "Gazzillion Ear" and by Jay Electronica for "Dimethyltryptamine".

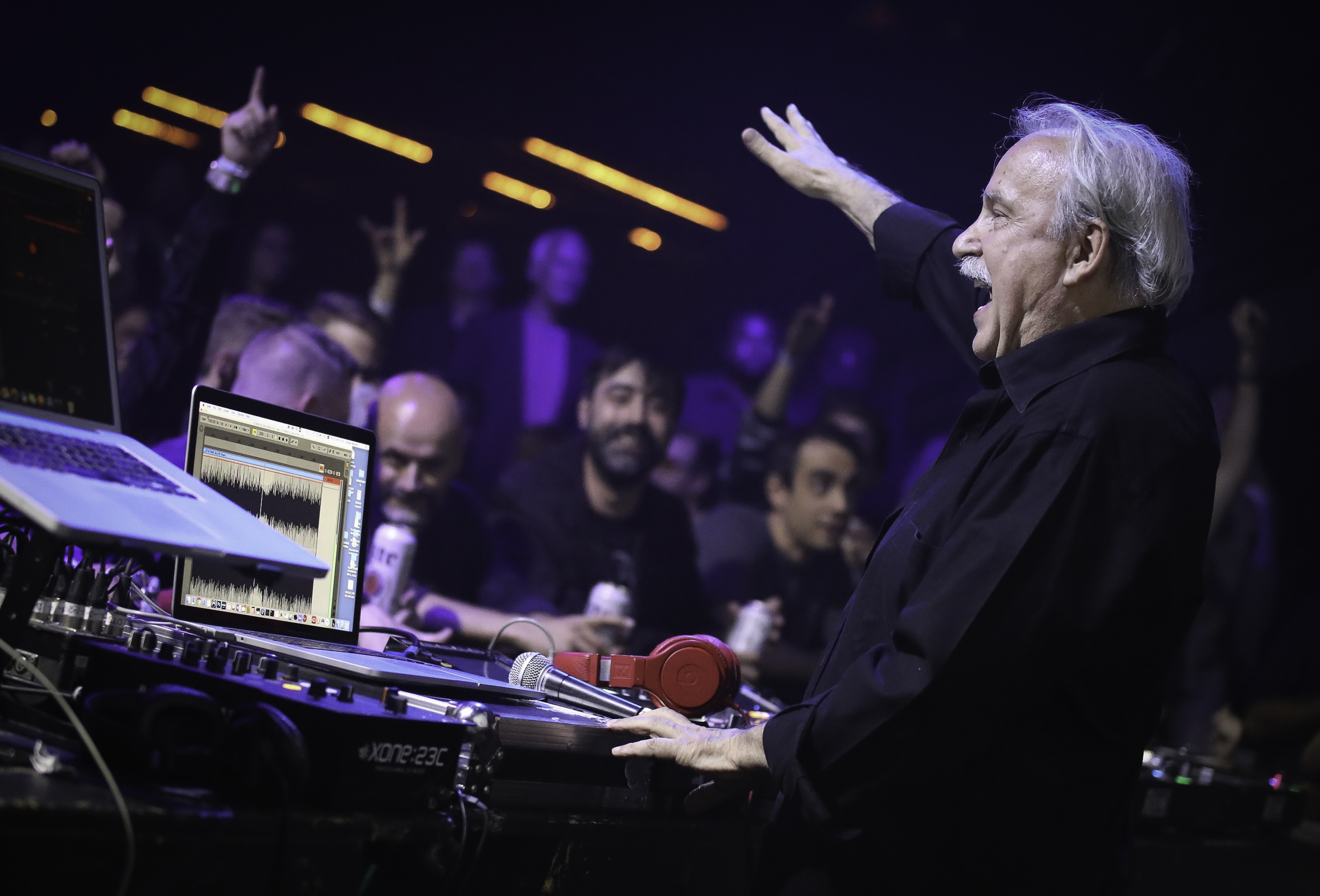
Moroder performing at First Avenue in Minneapolis, 2018

"Chase" was used as the entrance theme music for the professional wrestling tag team the Midnight Express throughout the early 1980s as well as in a number of montage videos for NBC's Major League Baseball coverage and CBS's coverage of the NBA. Art Bell also frequently used the song as the main theme and bumper music for his late-night talk radio programs Coast to Coast AM and Midnight in the Desert.

Moroder's opening theme from the 1983 film Scarface is sampled by Nas and Mobb Deep for the track "It's Mine". "Leopard Tree Dream" from Cat People is sampled by Cannibal Ox in the song "Iron Galaxy". "The Legend of Babel" theme from the Metropolis soundtrack was covered by DJ Dado. British electronica musician Little Boots covered "Love Kills", which was written in collaboration with Freddie Mercury. "Future Lovers", a song from American recording artist Madonna's 2005 album Confessions on a Dance Floor, has a bass line inspired by Donna Summer's Moroder-produced hit "I Feel Love". Furthermore, Madonna opened her 2006 Confessions Tour with a medley of "Future Lovers" and "I Feel Love". The version of "Live to Tell" that Madonna performed on The Confessions Tour heavily samples Moroder's song "Tears". Suns of Arqa's album "Technomor" includes the track "Moroder Vibe" which contains elements of "I Feel Love". Underworld's 1999 album, Beaucoup Fish, contains a song titled "Shudder/King of Snake", which contains an interpolation of the bass line from "I Feel Love".

"I Feel Love" was inducted into the National Recording Registry in 2011.

In 2013, a dance club named after Moroder called Georgio's opened in Hollywood's Standard Hotel. Moroder even visited it and for the first time saw people dancing to his music, stating: "I never saw people dancing to my music. I was too busy working. I was always in the studio. I never took the coca."

In February 2016, Shooter Jennings, the son of outlaw country singer Waylon Jennings, released a tribute album entitled Countach (For Giorgio), his seventh studio album. Shooter Jennings stated that Moroder's music from the movies Midnight Express (1978), Cat People (1982) and The NeverEnding Story (1984) had a major influence on him as a child which "...set the foundation for the music of my entire life."

Before his career reboot with Daft Punk, Moroder dedicated decades to his personal hobbies/projects. He designed a car with Marcello Gandini and ex-Lamborghini personnel Claudio Zampolli, the Cizeta-Moroder V16T. Also, in a 2013 interview, he spoke about the architectural design of a pyramid-like apartment that was supposed to take place in Dubai. It was never built. Other projects included creating his own cognac liquor and getting involved with digital and neon art and putting on shows.

2016 Giorgio Moroder donated the 13 platinum discs for Flashdance to the Museum Gherdëina in his hometown.

Moroder is a character in Summer: The Donna Summer Musical, in reference to his work with disco diva Donna Summer.

== Personal life ==
Moroder currently lives in Los Angeles, California. He was married to his Mexican manager, Francisca Gutiérrez, from 1990 until her death in 2022. Their son, Alessandro (b. 1989), is a Los Angeles–based visual artist.

Moroder is a friend of Michael Holm, with whom he composed the 1973 album Spinach 1 under the moniker "Spinach". Holm's song "Giorgio und ich" is dedicated to Moroder.

== Discography ==
- That's Bubblegum – That's Giorgio (1969)
- Giorgio (1970)
- Son of My Father (1972)
- Giorgio's Music (1973)
- Einzelgänger (1975)
- Knights in White Satin (1976)
- From Here to Eternity (1977)
- Love's in You, Love's in Me (1978)
- E=MC² (1979)
- Solitary Men (1983) (with Joe Esposito)
- Innovisions (1985)
- Philip Oakey & Giorgio Moroder (with Philip Oakey) (1985)
- To Be Number One (1990)
- Forever Dancing (1992)
- Déjà Vu (2015)

== See also ==
- Cizeta-Moroder V16T supercar project
- Honorific nicknames in popular music
- List of artists who reached number one on the U.S. Dance Club Songs chart
- List of Billboard number-one dance club songs
