= People Under the Stairs discography =

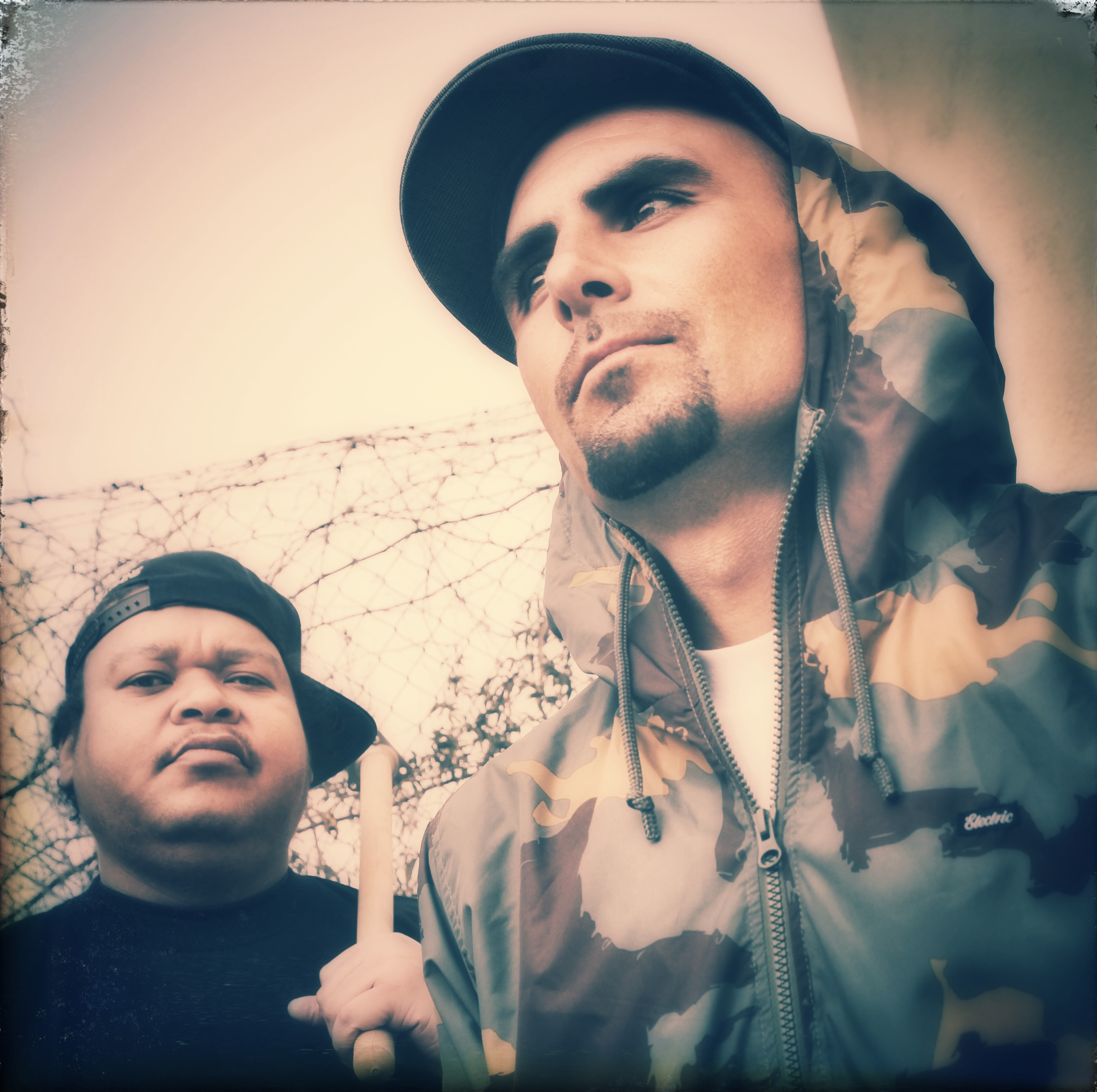
- Double K (left) & Thes One (right)
- Studio albums: 12
- EPs: 4
- Compilation albums: 2
- Singles: 18
- Video albums: 4
- Music videos: 3
- Other official releases: 6
- Side projects: 12
- Guest appearances: 34

People Under the Stairs (also known as PUTS) was an American hip hop group from Los Angeles, California, formed in 1997. The group consists solely of two members, Thes One (Christopher Portugal) and Double K (Michael Turner), who share between them the duties of MCing, DJing and producing.

The discography of People Under The Stairs consists of twelve studio albums, two compilations, eighteen singles, one live DVD and many other releases, collaborations and guest appearances.

== Albums ==
=== Studio albums ===
List of studio albums, with selected chart positions
Release Date			Title	Label	Catalog	Format	US Indie	US Heat	Notes
Day	Month	Year	Title	Label	Catalog	Format	US Indie	US Heat	Notes
23	Mar	1998	The Next Step	PUTS†	6002	CD, 2xLP	—	—	† Re-released on Om (OM-033) in 2001
6	Jun	2000	Question in the Form of an Answer	Om	OM-036	CD, 2xLP	—	—	
4	Jun	2002	O.S.T.	Om	OM-105	CD, 2xLP	50	—	Re-released by PL70 (PL7025) and VMP (RH039) in 2020.
19	Aug	2003	...Or Stay Tuned	Om	OM-137	CD, 2xLP	—	—	
18	Apr	2006	Stepfather	Basement; Tres‡	BR1157-2; TR396-017	CD/DVD; 2xLP	35	32	‡ Non-US CD/DVD release: Tres TR396-016
30	Sep	2008	Fun DMC	Gold Dust	GDM007	CD, LP	—	6	
13	Oct	2009	Carried Away	Om	OH-387	CD, 2xLP, MP3	—	23	
30	Sep	2011	Highlighter	PL70	PL7002	CD, 2xLP, 24-bit AAC	—	—	
6	May	2014	12 Step Program	PL70	PL7015	CD, Cassette, 2xLP, MP3	—	11	
20	Nov	2015	The Gettin' Off Stage, Part 1	PL70	PL7020	CD, LP, MP3, Cassette††	—	—	
20	April	2016	The Gettin' Off Stage, Part 2	Redef PL70	RDF103 PL7021	CD, LP, MP3 Cassette††	—	—	†† Cassette release comprises Step 1 & Step 2.
1	February	2019	Sincerely, The P	PL70	PL7024	CD, Cassette, 2xLP, MP3	—	—	
"—" denotes releases that did not chart.

=== Compilation albums ===
Release Date			Title	Label	Catalog	Format	Notes
Year	Month	Day	Title	Label	Catalog	Format	Notes
		2000	American Men Vol. 1	PUTS	6004	CD	Limited run of 200-500 copies released at concerts
22	Jul	2008	The Om Years	Om	OH-312	2xCD, 2xLP	
"—" denotes releases that did not chart.

=== Extended plays ===
Year	EP	Label	Catalog	Format	Notes
2000	Question in the Form of an Answer Instrumentals	Om	OM-044LP	LP	
2007	Stepfather Instrumentals Part One	Tres	TR396-019	12"	
2007	Stepfather Instrumentals Part Two	Tres	TR396-025	12"	
2011	Highlighter EP	PL70	N/A	Digital	iTunes-only release
2016	The Gettin' Off Stage, Step 1 Instrumentals	Redef	RDF102	LP, Cassette‡, MP3	
2016	The Gettin' Off Stage, Step 2 Instrumentals	Redef PL70	RDF104 RDF-PL70	LP, MP3 Cassette‡	‡ Cassette release comprises Step 1 & Step 2 Instrumentals.
2016	Triple Digits EP	PL70	N/A	Digital / 12"	Collaboration with Chemistry Surfboards, with one track by PUTS, two tracks by Jason Bennett and one by Thes One.

== Singles ==
List of singles, with selected chart positions
Year	Single	Label	Catalog	Format	U.S. Rap	Album
1998	"The Next Step II"	PUTS	6001	12"	—	The Next Step
2000	"Youth Explosion"	Om	OM-034SV	12"	—	Question in the Form of an Answer
2000	"The Cat"	Om	OM-038	12", CD	—	Question in the Form of an Answer
2000	"We'll Be There"	Om	OM-056SV	12"	36	Question in the Form of an Answer
2002	"Jappy Jap"	Om	OM-107SV	12"	—	O.S.T.
2002	"O.S.T. (Original Soundtrack)"	Om	OM-109SV	12"	—	O.S.T.
2002	"Acid Raindrops"	Om	OM-124SV	12"	—	O.S.T.
2003	"Yield/Out Da Club"	Om	OM-139SV	12"	—	...Or Stay Tuned
2006	"Tuxedo Rap"	Tres	TR396-015	12"	—	Stepfather
2006	"Pass The 40"	Tres	TR396-018	12"	—	Stepfather
2006	"Tuxedo Rap (Remix)" (feat. Time Machine & Shawn Jackson): Limited edition (500 pressed)	Bootleg	BLR 6006	10"	—	Stepfather
2008	"Step Bacc/The Wiz"	Gold Dust	N/A	Digital	—	Fun DMC
2008	"Party Enemy No. 1/Critical Condition"	Gold Dust	N/A	Digital	—	Fun DMC
2009	"Trippin' At The Disco"	Om	N/A	Digital	—	Carried Away
2009	"Trippin' At The Disco (DJ Day Mix)": Limited edition (500 pressed)	Sai-Sam	SSR-300	12"	—	Carried Away
2009	"Beer (Colt45 Mix)": Limited edition (1,000 pressed)	Om	N/A	7"	—	Carried Away
2010	"Beer"	Om	N/A	Digital	—	Carried Away
2011	"Down in LA/Acid Raindrops (Live)": Limited edition (300 pressed)	Om	N/A	7"	—	Carried Away
2016	Fishbucket Soundcheck (Sactown Re-edit)	PL70 / Redef	RDF110	Flexi 7"	—	
2018	"Drinking & Jivin'"	PL70	N/A	Digital	—	

== Videos ==
=== DVDs ===
Year	Title	Notes
2006	Stepfather Bonus DVD	Included with CD purchase of Stepfather
2009	The 10 Year Anniversary Set	Recorded live at the El Rey Theatre; December 19, 2008

=== Web animation ===
Year	Title	Notes
2002	Finding Bin Laden, Episode 1	Official YouTube link
2008	Rick James, The B-Boy From Buffalo	Collaboration with Controller 7 Official YouTube link

== Music videos ==
Year	Title	Album	Notes
2008	"The Wiz"	Fun DMC	Official YouTube link
2009	"Trippin' At The Disco"	Carried Away	Official YouTube link
2010	"Beer"	Carried Away	Official YouTube link
2014	"1 Up Til Sun Up"	12 Step Program	Official YouTube link

== Other official releases ==
Year	Title	Label	Catalog	Format	Notes
2002	The Trip 7"	HipHopSite	HHS-0008	7"	
2003	Other Such Tracks	No Label	N/A	CD-R	
2006	Stepfather: The Fake Leak	PUTS	N/A	Digital	Intentionally "leaked" joke album
2008	Funner Than Leather	PUTS	N/A	Digital	Promotional mixtape for Fun DMC
2011	Fun DMC (Dub Version)	PUTS	N/A	Digital	
2013	"Holiday Party"	PUTS	N/A	Digital	Holiday single-track release

== Side projects ==
Side projects and solo work for Thes One
Year	Title	Label	Catalog	Format	Notes
2001	Back On The Block (Remix)	Bootleg	BLR 6005	12" single	Remix of Pete Rock & CL Smooth track from PeteStrumentals
2004	The Next Stets	Kajmere	KSD-036	12" single	Remixes of two Stetsasonic tracks from In Full Gear
2004	Noonen	Tres	TR396-001	12" single	Inaugural release of the Tres label
2004	Bloquera	Tres	TR396-003	12" EP	Collaboration with members of Giant Panda
2004	Mithai	PL70	6010	CD	Limited edition (500 pressed); Mixtape produced for Thes One's wedding
2004	Thes One Presents: Live At The Rootdown Soundclash	P-Vine	PCD-4199	CD	Live recording (with bonus studio material) of Thes One's performances during a beat battle with will.i.am.
2005	Doin' It	Tres	TR396-005	12" EP	Collaboration with Raashan Ahmad of Crown City Rockers
2007	Lifestyle Marketing	Tres	TR396-023	2xCD, 2xLP	10" Single: "Target"/"Grain Belt Beer" (Tres TR396-022)
2007	The Mop	PL70	PL7005	7" single	Promotional single for author Alan Simpson's book The Mop
2013	10 Years Of Thes One	PL70	PL7001	5xLP, Digital	Box set with MP3 player
2014	Where The Piecelock Ends	PL70 / Redef	RDF109	Digital, LP	Physical LP via Redefinition Records was released in 2016.
2017	Náufrago	PL70	PL7021	Digital, LP, Cassette	Collaboration with DJ Day
2017	The Legend of the 40 Dogz	PL70	N/A	Digital	Collaboration with Newman of Giant Panda and Jason Bennett.
2018	Dogwhistles	PL70	PL7023	Flexi 7"	

Side projects and solo work for Double K
Year	Title	Label	Catalog	Format	Notes
2002	Uhh, I Hope Y'all Got Your Sunglasses On Out There	PUTS	N/A	CD, Digital	Mixtape as "LA Mike"
2005	Doin' What We Do, The Way We Do, When We Do What We Do…	N/A	N/A	CD	Mixtape with AC The PD
2008	Taking Me Places / Face To Face	Content	CNT 1006	7" single	Split single with Olde Soul & Blak King
2017	Clinophobia (While You Were Sleeping)	PL70	PL7022	LP, Digital	As "LA Mike"

== Guest appearances ==
=== On compilations ===
Year	Song	Compilation	Label	Catalog
2000	"Schooled in the Trade"	Om Lounge 3	Om	OM-037
2000	"Afternoon Connection"	Deep Concentration 3	Om	OM-042
2000	"Sunroof"	Om Lounge 4	Om	OM-047
2002	"Quid Control"	How To Cut & Paste, Mix Tape Vol. 2	Antidote	ANTCD101
2003	"Chollo Dad"	We Came From Beyond, Vol. 2	Razor & Tie	7930182895-1
2004	"The Bomb Combo"	Impeach The Precedent	Kajmere	KAJ-011

=== Featured performers ===
Songs featuring People Under The Stairs
Year	Title	Album	Artist	Label	Catalog
1998	"Just the Three of Us"	Nommo Warfare, Vol. 1	Dr. Oop	PUTS	6003
2003	"Movin' To My Beat"	J Boogie's Dubtronic Science	J Boogie	Om	OM-131
2003	"Travel"	Air Farina	Mark Farina	Om	OM-141
2006	"Shoot Your Shot"	Bang for the Buck	Ugly Duckling	Fat Beats	FB5117
2011	"Surgeon General"	Red Line Radio	Headnodic	Brick	BRK-104

Songs featuring Thes One
Year	Title	Album	Artist	Label	Catalog
2005	"Racist"	Fly School Reunion	Giant Panda	Tres	TRCD-002
2006	"2266 Cambridge"	The Audience's Listening	Cut Chemist	WB	48559-2

Songs featuring Double K
Year	Title	Album	Artist	Label	Catalog
2000	Big Bank Take Little Bank	Journey to Anywhere	Ugly Duckling	XL	XLCD140
2003	Various tracks	Taste The Secret	Ugly Duckling	Emperor Norton	EMN 7065
2004	"L.A. Mike... Live From the Blackyard"	Night Train To Babble On	Fat Hed	Dope Discs	DD001-2
2005	"Family Rap"	Hit The Floor	Breakestra	Ubiquity	URCD 178

=== Production ===
Songs produced by People Under The Stairs
Year	Title	Album	Artist	Label	Catalog
1998	All tracks	Nommo Warfare, Vol. 1	Dr. Oop	PUTS	6003
1999	"24 Hrs. w/a G"	Good Music	Murs	Veritech	NC-999

Songs produced by Thes One
Year	Title	Album	Artist	Label	Catalog
2000	"Wishful Thinking"	Heavenbound	Scarub	Mary Joy	MKCM 1020
2001	"Home"/"The Come On"	Mission: Home	Mission	Om	PR-074SV
2004	"Give It Up"	Impeach The Precedent	J-Live	Kajmere	KAJ-011
2005	Entire album	Fly School Reunion	Giant Panda	Tres	TRCD-002
2008	"Ready To Fly"	Electric Laser	Giant Panda	Tres	TR396-040

Songs produced by Double K
Year	Title	Album	Artist	Label	Catalog
1996	"Red Dots"	Commurshul EP	Murs	N/A	N/A
1999	"Uncle Nut"	O.G. Status	Dooley-O	Sleediz	SLDZ020

=== Remixing ===
Songs remixed by People Under The Stairs
Year	Song	Album	Artist	Notes
2001	"A Little Salsa (Remix)"	A Little Samba (Remix) 12" single	Ugly Duckling	original song on album Journey to Anywhere
2002	"Don't Get It Twisted"	Plan X/Don't Get It Twisted 12" single	Jigmastas	original song on album Infectious
2003	"Try Me (People Under The Stairs Remix)"	Try Me 12" single	J Boogie	original song on album J Boogie's Dubtronic Science
2005	"Cali Spaces (People Under The Stairs Remix)"	Cali Spaces EP	Mark Farina	original song on compilation Mushroom Jazz Vol. 5

Songs remixed by Thes One
Year	Song	Album	Artist	Notes
2001	"Four Square (Thes One Remix)"	Artistry Original 12" single	Starving Artists Crew	
2003	"The Feeling Of Now (Thes One Remix)"	The Feeling Of Now 12" single	Raw Produce	original song on album The Feeling Of Now
2004	"Another Day (Thes One Remix)"	Another Day (Rhyme Writing) 12" single	Crown City Rockers	original song on album Earthtones
2004	"The Kick Clap (Ralphie Mix)"	The Kick Clap 12" single	Starving Artists Crew	original song on album Up Pops The Sac
2013	"Boots In The Pool (Thes One - Wonderful Radio Remix)"	Land Of 1000 Chances Remixes EP	DJ Day	original song on album Land of 1000 Chances
