= The Om Years =

Compilation album by People Under the Stairs
- Released: July 22, 2008
- Recorded: 1996–2003, Los Angeles, California
- Genre: Hip hop
- Length: 121:11 (CD), 56:05 (LP)
- Label: Om Records
- Producer: Thes One; Double K

People Under the Stairs chronology
Stepfather (2006)	The Om Years (2008)	Fun DMC (2008)

Professional ratings
Review scores
Source	Rating
HypeMusic	9/10 stars
PopMatters	8/10 stars

The Om Years is the second compilation album by People Under the Stairs. It is a combination of popular tracks from the group's first four albums (The Next Step, Question in the Form of an Answer, O.S.T. and ...Or Stay Tuned), and also includes extra b-sides and rarities.

The album was released in two formats:

- A double-CD album, with the album tracks on the first CD, titled Disc 1: The Om Years, and a second bonus CD, titled Disc 2: B-Sides and Rarities.
- A double-LP album, with a selection of the first CD's tracks, and two songs ("The Bomb Combo" and "Out Da Club") from the b-sides & rarities CD.

Om Records released this compilation album in an attempt to capitalize on the buzz about the group's upcoming album, Fun DMC, and the group's past success with the label. The group would return to the Om label on 2009's Carried Away.

== CD track listing ==
All songs written by Christopher "Thes One" Portugal and Michael "Double K" Turner, except where noted.

Disc 1: The Om Years
No.	Title	Writer(s)	Length
1.	"Intro"		0:42
2.	"San Francisco Knights"		4:32
3.	"43 Labels I Like"		1:50
4.	"Time To Rock Our Shit"		4:26
5.	"The Cat"		3:42
6.	"We'll Be There"		5:27
7.	"Youth Explosion"		4:41
8.	"Code Check"		3:35
9.	"Give Love A Chance"		4:29
10.	"Jappy Jap"		3:46
11.	"The Suite For A Beaver Part One"		4:26
12.	"O.S.T. (Original Soundtrack)"	C. Portugal, M. Turner, O. Johnson	5:12
13.	"Empty Bottles Of Water"		3:29
14.	"The L.A. Song"		4:26
15.	"Hang Loose"		4:02
16.	"Acid Raindrops"		4:56
17.	"The Breakdown"	C. Portugal, M. Turner, E.L. Parsonage	5:00
18.	"Montego Slay"		4:12
19.	"Yield"		3:48
20.	"Play It Again Outro"		1:36

Disc 2: B-Sides and Rarities
No.	Title	Length
1.	"Double K presents Invisible Blunt Roller"	1:25
2.	"I-15"	3:22
3.	"Tour Guide"	3:56
4.	"Schooled In The Trade (Instrumental)"	4:41
5.	"Big Daddy Brown"	3:11
6.	"Hang Loose, Pt. 2"	4:23
7.	"Sunroof (Instrumental)"	5:28
8.	"The Bomb Combo"	4:30
9.	"Afternoon Connection"	4:08
10.	"Out Da Club"	3:51
11.	"We'll Be There (10 Second Remix)"	3:59

Disc 1:

- Tracks 2, 4 & 20 are from The Next Step (1998).
- Tracks 3 & 5-9 are from Question in the Form of an Answer (2000).
- Tracks 1 & 10-18 are from O.S.T. (2002).
- Track 19 is from ...Or Stay Tuned (2003).

Disc 2:

- Tracks 1, 3 & 11 are B-sides from the "We'll Be There" single (2000).
- Track 5 is a B-side from the "Youth Explosion" single (2000).
- Track 2 is a B-side from the "Jappy Jap" single (2002).
- Track 6 is a B-side from the "Acid Raindrops" single (2002).
- Track 10 is a B-side from the "Yield" single (2003).
- Tracks 4 & 7-9 are from various multi-artist Om compilation albums.

== LP track listing ==
All songs written by Christopher "Thes One" Portugal and Michael "Double K" Turner, except where noted.

Side 1
No.	Title	Length
1.	"San Francisco Knights"	4:32
2.	"Time To Rock Our Shit"	4:26
3.	"We'll Be There"	5:27

Side 2
No.	Title	Length
1.	"43 Labels I Like"	1:50
2.	"Youth Explosion"	4:41
3.	"Jappy Jap"	3:46
4.	"The Suite For A Beaver Part One"	4:26

Side 3
No.	Title	Writer(s)	Length
1.	"O.S.T. (Original Soundtrack)"	C. Portugal, M. Turner, O. Johnson	5:12
2.	"Hang Loose"		4:02
3.	"The L.A. Song"		4:26

Side 4
No.	Title	Length
1.	"Acid Raindrops"	4:56
2.	"The Bomb Combo"	4:30
3.	"Out Da Club"	3:51
