= 12 Step Program (album) =

Studio album by People Under the Stairs
- Released: May 6, 2014
- Recorded: 2013–2014, Los Angeles, California
- Genre: Hip hop
- Length: 50:11
- Label: PL70 Records; PUTS Records
- Producer: Thes One; Double K

People Under the Stairs chronology
Highlighter (2011)	12 Step Program (2014)

Singles from 12 Step Program
- 1. "1 Up Til Sun Up" Released: April 7, 2014

Professional ratings
Review scores
Source	Rating
Allmusic	(positive)
HipHopSite.com	4/4 stars
KevinNottingham.com	6/10 stars

12 Step Program (also stylized as 12SP) is the ninth album by the People Under the Stairs. It is the second album entirely self-distributed using Thes One's artist-cooperative label, Piecelock 70, and it is also the group's shortest record to be marketed as a full-length album upon its release. (The group's fifth album, ...Or Stay Tuned, while shorter, was initially marketed as an EP.) 12 Step Program is also the group's first album since their second album, Question in the Form of an Answer, that uses only samples and no live instrumentation.

Despite not having a physical release, the track "1 Up Til Sun Up" was the lead single from the album. A music video for the song was released on April 7, 2014, the same day that iTunes debuted the song and began accepting pre-orders for 12 Step Program.

Upon the album release, PUTS embarked on a North American tour in support of the album, with plans to visit other countries later in the year.

== Recording ==
People Under the Stairs recorded most of the album in Los Angeles at their home studios in between tour dates in late 2013 and early 2014. On January 28, 2014, Thes One announced on social media that People Under the Stairs' ninth full-length album would be titled 12 Step Program.

Some of the final mixing work was performed in March while the group played festivals in Texas, including the Paste Untapped Indie Music & Beer Festival in Fort Worth and SXSW in Austin.

== Release and reception ==
Recognizing the current dominance of digital music and the growing trend away from physical media, only a limited number of LP records, cassette tapes and compact discs were produced for 12 Step Program. The album itself has an orange and blue color scheme, which carried over to the double-record set, which includes one orange and one blue translucent vinyl and a large 24-page booklet, as well as the cassette tape (a first for PUTS), produced in translucent blue with orange lettering.

A week before the album's release on May 6, 2014, pre-orders for the physical copies were announced on the band's official website, and over the next 24 hours, the website's server crashed 4 times due to eager fans attempts to obtain the album. The earliest crashes even delayed the album's release for nearly half a day.

12 Step Program debuted at #56 on the iTunes charts, #7 on the iTunes rap charts, #11 on the Billboard Heatseeker charts, and #33 on the Billboard R&B/Rap Album charts.

Album reviews have been positive. Allmusic highly recommends the album and calls "every sample perfectly placed and every rhyme on point", while HipHopSite.com calls 12 Step Program "smoothly produced" with "many moments of subtle brilliance".

== Track listing ==
All songs written by Christopher "Thes One" Portugal and Michael "Double K" Turner.

No.	Title	Length
1.	"Roundabouts"	3:57
2.	"Ste. For Reefer"	7:10
3.	"1 Up Til Sun Up"	3:59
4.	"Cool Story Bro"	4:17
5.	"The Strand"	3:46
6.	"LA Nights"	5:15
7.	"Get Hip"	3:05
8.	"Pictures On My Wall"	4:37
9.	"Breakup Music"	3:31
10.	"Yes I Can"	2:34
11.	"Umbrellas (God Forgive Me)"	4:00
12.	"Doctor Feelgood"	4:06
