= Fun DMC =

Studio album by People Under the Stairs
- Released: September 30, 2008
- Recorded: Los Angeles, California
- Genre: Hip hop
- Length: 75:39 (CD), 57:13 (LP)
- Label: Gold Dust Media
- Producers: Thes One; Double K

People Under the Stairs chronology
The Om Years (2008)	Fun DMC (2008)	Carried Away (2009)

Singles from Fun DMC
- 1. "Step Bacc"/"The Wiz" Released: August 26, 2008; 2. "Public Enemy No. 1"/"Critical Condition" Released: October 14, 2008

Professional ratings
Review scores
Source	Rating
Allmusic	(favorable)
Pitchfork Media	(7.6/10)
PopMatters	8/10 stars
HipHopDX	3/5 stars
The Find Magazine	(7.5/10)
Okayplayer	(favorable)

Fun DMC is the sixth album by People Under the Stairs. The album was a concept album and, at the time of its release, the most widely reviewed and lauded of the group's catalog. In support of the album, PUTS released two singles, as well as the group's first music video for "The Wiz". For the release of the album, the group again chose an independent label, Gold Dust Media.

== Recording ==
The name of the album is partly a homage to the group Run–D.M.C., but also an expression of what the group felt that they provided to their listeners: a relaxing party album, with bits of introspection mixed in. For the first time, the group decided to create a concept album involving the daily life of a typical Central or South Central Los Angeles resident. They even brought recording equipment to a summer house party and barbecue, and used the ambient noise from the party to supplement the opening, "daytime" songs on the new album.

The first half of the album includes songs about record collecting ("The Ultimate 144"), video gaming ("Gamin On Ya") and partying ("Anotha' BBQ", "Enjoy"). As the day moves on into evening and nighttime, the subject matter of the album gets more reflective and serious, even touching upon Thes One's fears of becoming a parent ("A Baby") and the loss of loved ones ("D").

Much like "43 Labels I Like" covered vinyl record labels on Question in the Form of an Answer, "The Ultimate 144" is a clear reference to the Ultimate Breaks and Beats series of compilation albums geared toward DJs looking for drum breaks, and the lyrics are mostly song titles from the series.

For a period of time leading up to the release of Fun DMC, Thes One became an avid collector of standalone arcade games. While toying with the arcade cabinets, he found a way to plug the audio lines for the games' soundtracks into recording equipment. This discovery allowed Thes One to use several old video game soundtracks and effects to create the backing track for "Gamin' On Ya".

== Promotion ==
Having toured extensively throughout Australia several times since 2004, Thes One and Double K wrote the song "The Wiz" about their travels down under. In Spring 2008, the group worked with director Matt Bird to film the video for "The Wiz" on location in Bondi Beach. The filming of the video involved underwater cameras, cranes, and an elaborate helicopter shot. It was the group's first official music video.

To support the release of the album, Thes One prepared a free digital mixtape, with the similarly Run-D.M.C.-inspired name, Funner Than Leather. The mixtape included several early disco and old school hip hop tracks from the 1970s and 1980s with added instrumentation and vocals from the group and several guest contributors, including Crown City Rockers, Time Machine, Aesthetics Crew and DJ Day.

With the assistance of San Jose producer Controller 7, the group also created a joke video on YouTube called Rick James the B-Boy from Buffalo. Unrelated to the album, the video features Double K imitating Rick James while he raps to classic hip hop tracks.

== Release and touring ==
Fun DMC debuted on the Billboard Heatseekers List at #6. The album also received universally positive reviews. Allmusic called the album "infinitely fresher and more original" than other current artists, and PopMatters dubbed it "the height of their career thus far."

The album was also lauded for its concept and tone. The Pitchfork Media review explained that Double K and Thes One "confront deeper matters, and sleekly weave them into their classic good-vibe atmosphere, offering listeners a new level of profundity, energy, and intricacy without surrendering the sheer pleasure they expect from a People Under the Stairs record."

Following a nationwide tour of the US in support of the album, PUTS celebrated their 10-year anniversary with a sold out show on December 19, 2008 at the historic El Rey Theatre in Los Angeles, performing multiple songs from every album. The performance was released on DVD the following year.

== Alternate version ==
In spring of 2011, the group released a dub version of the album that Thes One had made while mixing the album in 2008, available exclusively on their recently launched website.

== Track listing ==
All songs written by Christopher "Thes One" Portugal and Michael "Double K" Turner, except where noted.

No.	Title	Writer(s)	Length
1.	"Swan Fever"		5:19
2.	"Step Bacc"		3:31
3.	"Up Yo Spine (Fishbucket Pt. 3)"		3:54
4.	"The Fun (Ste. For Peter Pt. 1)"		4:19
5.	"The Grind (Ste. For Peter Pt. 2)"		3:20
6.	"Anotha' (BBQ)"		4:25
7.	"The Ultimate 144"		3:39
8.	"Letter 2 c/o The Bronx"		2:04
9.	"Party Enemy No. 1"		3:20
10.	"Enjoy"		3:15
11.	"Gamin' On Ya"		2:32
12.	"Critical Condition"		3:01
13.	"The Wiz"		4:13
14.	"People Riddum (feat. Odell)"	C. Portugal, M. Turner, O. Johnson	3:49
15.	"California (feat. Blvme)"	C. Portugal, M. Turner, B. Barnes	5:11
16.	"Love's Theme"		4:00
17.	"A Baby"		2:33
18.	"Same Beat (The Wesley Rap)"		4:44
19.	"D"		4:18
20.	"The Mike & Chris Story"		4:23

The double-LP version of the album omits tracks 7, 8, 10, 11, 17 and 19, and it places "Party Enemy No. 1" between "Critical Condition" and "The Wiz". Consequently, it is nearly 20 minutes shorter, and Side B is mixed slightly differently than its corresponding CD material.
