= MC Groovz Dance Craze =

2004 video game

- North American cover art
- Developer: Mad Catz
- Publisher: Mad Catz
- Platform: GameCube
- Release: NA: November 22, 2004; PAL: June 23, 2005
- Genre: Music
- Modes: Single-player, multiplayer

MC Groovz Dance Craze is a rhythm game for the GameCube developed and published by Mad Catz. The game is a Dance Dance Revolution clone and was bundled with Mad Catz' Beat Pad accessory. The game was originally announced via a press release on November 2, 2004.

== Gameplay ==
There are two main gameplay modes: Scroll and Spin. In Scroll mode, the player steps on four different directions on the game pad (right, up, down and left) as the arrows scroll towards four icons at the top of the screen. Spin mode adds four additional directions. Its songs are also longer than other dance games, often lasting around seven minutes.

The game also includes three extra modes of play: Dance Workout (tracks calories burned during play), Dance Together (two-player cooperative), and Dance Faceoff (two-player face-off).

== Songs ==
The game includes 28 songs, including several licensed songs from original artists such as KC and the Sunshine Band, Earth, Wind & Fire, Jewel, Jessica Simpson, The Emotions, Whodini, Las Ketchup, Peaches & Herb, Patti LaBelle, David Naughton, Jump5, Call Me Alice, Kaskade, Rithma, Boogie's Dubtronic Science, Miguel Migs, Ming (DJ) + FS, Afro Mystik and DJ Jazzy Jeff & The Fresh Prince.

== Reception ==
The game received "generally unfavorable" reviews, according to video game review score aggregator Metacritic. IGN has said that it is "Playable, but not fun." and suggests that "The footwork doesn't match the music.". In regards to the workout mode, GameSpot said while it can count calories, it has no other differences from normal mode.

=== Lawsuit ===
On May 9, 2005, Konami filed a complaint against Roxor Games claiming an infringement of rights related to their dance game product In the Groove. On July 1, 2005, the complaint was amended to include MC Groovz Dance Craze. The aforementioned lawsuit was settled on November 1, 2006. The exact terms of the settlement were not mentioned in the press release.
