= Matthew Larkin Cassell =

- Born: San Francisco Bay Area, California, U.S.
- Genres: Funk, R&B, jazz, pop
- Occupations: Songwriter, vocalist, multi-instrumentalist, writer
- Years active: 1970s–present
- Labels: Stones Throw; P-Vine; Rapster; BBE

Matthew Larkin Cassell is an American songwriter, vocalist, multi-instrumentalist and writer. His songwriting style has been described as a fusion of funk, R&B, jazz and pop. A San Francisco Bay Area native, Cassell has made numerous appearances in the Bay Area and European tours throughout his formative years as a musician.

Cassell is best known for his original, privately pressed vinyl recordings from the 1970s and 1980s: the LP Pieces from 1977, the EP, Matt The Cat released in 1978, and the untitled 45 released in 1980. Cassell has seen a revival of interest in his music through the internet, rare vinyl and beat collectors, worldwide. Copies of his original records have exceeded $1,300.

The re-discovery of Cassell's recordings were covered in The Huffington Post. Joel Selvin of the San Francisco Chronicle wrote of Cassell's re-emergence, "A 21st century digital fairy tale," and Cassell's first interview with Paul Liberatore of the Marin Independent Journal.

First re-emerging in re-release through compilation on, The Kings of Digging compilation helmed by the DJ team Kon & Amir, recording artists Madlib, MF Doom, and People Under The Stairs and others have since sampled Cassell's early recordings.

Portions of Cassell's catalogue have been re-issued by the Blues Interactions / P-Vine label in Japan, Rapster Records in Berlin, and the BBE label in London, and is currently signed to the Stones Throw label in Los Angeles. His complete works are to be released by Stones Throw on May 17, 2010.

== Discography ==
- 1977 Pieces 12" (private press) LP (Limited Release 300 copies)
- 1978 Matt The Cat 12" (private press) EP
- 1980 Untitled, w/kid picture 7" (private press) 45 single
- 2006 Reissue "In My Life" appears on Kings of 'Diggin' CD, Kon/Amir, Rapster Records, Berlin/BBE, London
- 2007 Reissue "Heaven" Single 7" Off Track Kon/Amir, BBE, London
- 2008 Privatepress4 12" (private press) EP single
- 2008 Reissue – 2 CDs- Pieces & Matt The Cat/45 Untitled P-Vine / Blues Interactions label, Tokyo
- 2010 Reissue Complete Catalogue Vinyl (2x) & CD, Stones Throw, Los Angeles
