= Double K =

Double K may refer to:

- Double K (American musician), rapper from the group People Under the Stairs
- Illson, South Korean rapper formerly known as Double K
