= Lifestyle Marketing =

Studio album by Thes One
- Released: March 2007
- Recorded: 2003–2004, 2006, Los Angeles, California (Source material: early 1970s, Minneapolis, Minnesota)
- Genre: Hip hop
- Length: 98:42
- Label: Tres Records (Source material: Sound 80, Inc.)
- Producer: Thes One

Singles from Lifestyle Marketing
- 1. "Target"/"Grain Belt Beer" Released: 2007

Professional ratings
Review scores
Source	Rating
Allmusic	4/5 stars
URB	3.5/5 stars
HipHopSite.com	4/4 stars
HipHopCore.net	3.5/5 stars

Lifestyle Marketing is the debut studio album by producer and musician Thes One (of the Los Angeles hip hop group People Under The Stairs). It is an instrumental concept album consisting almost entirely of samples taken from radio and television advertising jingles created by Herb Pilhofer of Sound 80 Incorporated.

== Background ==
In the early-to-mid 1970s, Herb Pilhofer at Sound 80 Incorporated created the Music That Works series of demonstration albums, originally released in limited numbers. The records showcased Pilhofer's musical compositions for radio and television commercials, industrial films, and other projects.

The jingles are notable because they represent demonstration music for a significant number of large US corporations, both past and present, including Target, 3M, Northwestern Bell, Bobcat, and Pan-Am.

In addition to producing commercials, Sound 80 also was the studio responsible for recording a Grammy Award-winning album for the Saint Paul Chamber Orchestra in 1979 and portions of Bob Dylan's 1974 album, Blood on the Tracks.

== Album history ==
On a family visit to Minnesota in 1994, a 17-year-old Thes One came across a record from the Music That Works series, and years later, Thes One found a second album while record collecting. Following a world tour in support of People Under The Stairs' album O.S.T. in 2003, he began remixing parts of the albums as an experiment, intrigued by the chance to create musical works solely from very short samples (most of which were under fifteen seconds) of advertising jingles from inferior sources.

Thes One would continue to work on the project sporadically throughout the next year-and-a-half. He initially even decided against releasing it, but felt that it that the production was unique and interesting enough to warrant a release.

Around the end of 2004, Thes One contacted Pilhofer and interviewed him about creating the jingles and his work at Sound 80 Incorporated. Pilhofer was interested in the concept, and his interview with Thes One can be found in the liner notes for the album. Around this time, Thes One also made the decision to expand the project beyond the samples alone, and he invited his friend and fellow musician Ethan Parsonage (Headnodic from Crown City Rockers and The Mighty Underdogs) to records guitar and bass guitar parts for use on the album.

Thes One's work on the album was lost temporarily for a year and a half when he moved into a new house and built his new studio, Piecelock 70 in San Pedro, California, but in 2006, the tapes were recovered, mixed, and finalized.

The first disc is the actual album, while a second bonus disc consists of portions of the original tracks from the Music That Works series. For the vinyl release of the album, snippets of original tracks were placed directly in front of their remixed tracks in lieu of having a bonus disc.

== Reception ==
The album received positive reviews, especially in magazines and on websites devoted to hip hop. Allmusic, in a 4-star review, called Lifestyle Marketing "more than just a beat album, it's advertisement for the hip-hop generation [...] if Thes One and Lifestyle Marketing are any indication of the direction it's heading, there's nothing to worry about at all." URB magazine also called the album "both emotionally evocative and intellectually compelling."

== Track listing ==
All songs on Disc 1 arranged and produced by Christopher "Thes One" Portugal from material by Herb Pilhofer. All songs on Disc 2 composed, arranged and produced by Herb Pilhofer.

Disc 1: Lifestyle Marketing
No.	Title	Length
1.	"Gate City Saving And Loan"	3:04
2.	"Northwestern Bell"	3:16
3.	"Target"	3:58
4.	"Hy-Vee"	3:03
5.	"F&F Daily C"	2:56
6.	"Hart Ski"	1:04
7.	"Grain Belt Beer"	2:25
8.	"Bobcat"	2:59
9.	"Cheetah"	4:47
10.	"GBX Malt Liquor"	2:33
11.	"Crystal Sugar"	4:16
12.	"Northwestern Bell 2"	4:23
13.	"Pan-Am 1"	3:01
14.	"Pan-Am 2"	4:58
15.	"Outro"	2:19

Disc 2: Sound 80 Recording Selections from Music That Works, Vols. I & II
No.	Title	Length
1.	"Sound 80 Theme"	1:37
2.	"Pan-Am Suite"	2:04
3.	"Montage Tonka"	2:00
4.	"Hail Caesar"	1:50
5.	"Montage Juicy"	2:11
6.	"Songs From Setzuan"	2:00
7.	"Montage Cat"	3:32
8.	"Conwed Ceiling Tile"	2:42
9.	"3M"	1:08
10.	"3M Traffic Control"	2:28
11.	"76 Trombones"	3:52
12.	"Montage Minnesota"	3:24
13.	"Montage Bell"	4:27
14.	"Montage Hart"	3:27
15.	"Montage ABC"	3:30
16.	"Montage Northwest"	3:38
17.	"Montage Cheetah"	3:13
18.	"Mobius Flip"	2:55
