= Stepfather (album) =

Studio album by People Under the Stairs
- Released: April 18, 2006
- Recorded: 2005–2006, Los Angeles, California
- Genre: Hip hop
- Length: 75:36
- Label: PUTS Records
- Producers: Thes One; Double K

People Under the Stairs chronology
...Or Stay Tuned (2003)	Stepfather (2006)	The Om Years (2008)

Singles from Stepfather
- 1. "Tuxedo Rap" Released: 2006; 2. "Pass The 40" Released: 2006; 3. "Tuxedo Rap (Remix)" Released: 2006

Professional ratings
Review scores
Source	Rating
Allmusic	4/5 stars
Music for America	(favorable)
Okayplayer	3.5/5 stars
Tiny Mix Tapes	4/5 marks
PopMatters	6/10 stars
MicrophoneMaster	9.5/10 stars

Stepfather is the fifth album by People Under the Stairs. The album marked a departure from the group's previous Golden age hip hop sound, incorporating a more varied array of sample sources. It also produced two singles, "Tuxedo Rap" and "Pass The 40".

Distribution in the United States was handled by the Los Angeles-based label Basement Records, while overseas distribution was managed by Tres Records, a label co-founded by Thes One with Chikara Kurahashi from Giant Panda.

== Background ==
Following the release of their previous record, ...Or Stay Tuned, and another world tour, Thes One and Double K were no longer under contract with Om Records. This newfound independence led the group to feel a greater personal responsibility for the direction of their music. During this time, they also pursued side projects, and Thes One married his longtime girlfriend. The group began to move away from the "party life" associated with their earlier albums, and the musical and lyrical themes on their subsequent record reflected this change.

== Recording ==
When they began working on the new album in 2005, Thes One and Double K felt that sample-based hip hop was becoming repetitive, often relying on overused jazz samples. They were even critical of the success of their final Om releases, O.S.T. and ...Or Stay Tuned. The group was also dissatisfied with the rise of internet music piracy and the music industry's focus on "hot singles" rather than cohesive themed albums. Influenced by these factors, People Under the Stairs consciously decided to create a unique and different album, aiming for a broader, less jazz-centric sound palette. They felt it was necessary to distinguish themselves from what they perceived as a stale hip hop scene in Los Angeles.

Committed to highlighting their new musical direction, Thes One and Double K released Stepfather with a deliberately understated, minimalist album cover. Designed by Thes One's longtime friend Joshua Dunn of the design team Secret Pizza Party (who later became an editor for Wax Poetics), the cover was intended to resemble a "working copy" record sleeve. It featured only the group's name in Umbra font, two fireworks prints, the album title, and a phone number.

People Under the Stairs invited keyboardist Kat Ouano of the Oakland-based Crown City Rockers to perform on the album's closing track, "On & On". Her bandmate, Headnodic, had previously appeared on People Under the Stairs' third album, O.S.T. Both musicians have collaborated with the group on subsequent releases.

Double K, a lifelong fan of the P-Funk collective, invited G. Clinton to participate on the album, and Clinton accepted. He is featured on the track "The Doctor and the Kidd".

While record digging at a flea market in Mexico City in 2005, Thes One discovered a copy of the EP, Matt the Cat, by Matthew Cassell, a musician who recorded a small amount of material in the late 1970s. Thes One was immediately drawn to the record. Believing it to be a Mexican album, he included a sample of "All I'm Missing is You" by Cassell on the People Under the Stairs track "You". When Cassell learned that Thes One (and other DJs) had rediscovered his music, he requested that his name be included in the writing credits for the tracks featuring his samples, including "You".

== Fake leak ==
Stepfather was released during the peak of peer-to-peer file sharing, a period when unauthorized demos and bootlegs often surfaced online before official album releases. As a preventative measure, Christopher "Thes One" Portugal and Double K recorded a "fake album" (also titled Stepfather). They intentionally leaked this fake album online on February 21, 2006, with assistance from the People Under the Stairs online message board.

The leaked fake album consisted primarily of several tracks featuring Thes One reciting The Rime of the Ancient Mariner, bookended by introductory and concluding tracks that mocked listeners for their eagerness to obtain the album prematurely.

The fake leak (along with three bonus tracks) was later released as a promotional CD titled Redheaded Stepfather: The Fake Leak. This was a collaboration with the online retailer HipHopSite.com and was given away with album pre-orders.

== Reception and touring ==
Stepfather debuted at #32 on the Billboard Heatseekers Chart and #35 on the Billboard Independent Albums chart. Allmusic, in a positive review, stated that the album "successfully combines rhymes, beats, groove, and flow into one really coherent, 20-song record" and described the group as "experienced leaders who've made their mark in the music". Upon the album's release, Tiny Mix Tapes reviewer Alan Ranta also referred to the group as "movement leaders" of "culturally positive hip-hop" and called the album "the type of music that saves lives and makes good days great".

At initial in-store concerts supporting the album, Thes One and Double K observed that the average age of attendees was significantly younger than anticipated. Pleased that they were reaching a new generation of hip hop fans, the group requested that their United States tour dates be "all ages" shows, including in-store appearances at record shops, in an effort to connect with this new, younger audience.

They toured the US through Spring 2006, with the then-unknown rock-rap group Gym Class Heroes as their opening act. In Summer and Fall 2006, the group embarked on another world tour, visiting Australia, New Zealand, Japan, and Europe. For the European leg of the tour, they were accompanied by Giant Panda. In 2007, the group made additional visits to the UK and the Western United States.

== Track listing ==
All songs written by Christopher "Thes One" Portugal and Michael "Double K" Turner, except where noted.

No.	Title	Writer(s)	Length
1.	"Intro"		2:25
2.	"Step In"		3:00
3.	"Pass The 40"		3:39
4.	"Pumpin'"		4:14
5.	"Flex Off"		5:27
6.	"Tuxedo Rap"		5:32
7.	"Days Like These"		4:23
8.	"Jamboree, Pt. 1"		5:27
9.	"Jamboree, Pt. 2"		3:01
10.	"The Doctor and the Kidd (feat. George Clinton)"	C. Portugal, M. Turner, G. Clinton	1:41
11.	"Eat Street"		3:24
12.	"Crown Ones"		4:52
13.	"LA9X"		4:01
14.	"The Brownout"		4:30
15.	"Letter To The Old School"		2:38
16.	"More Than You Know"		3:49
17.	"Reflections (feat. Odell)"	C. Portugal, M. Turner, O. Johnson	4:47
18.	"4 Dollar Afro"		0:56
19.	"You"	C. Portugal, M. Turner, M. Cassell	3:12
20.	"On & On"	C. Portugal, M. Turner, K. Ouano	4:52

The compact disc version of the album included a bonus DVD, which featured:

- several short videos about the group and the making of the album
- "Ice Castle 2001" (a short film)
- two music videos for Thes One's Bloquera side project
- a music video for Double K's side project Tha Brothaload
- a hidden easter egg of Thes One as a contestant on The Price Is Right
