= American Men Vol. 1 =

Compilation album by People Under the Stairs
- Released: 2000
- Recorded: 1996–2000, Los Angeles, California
- Genre: Hip hop
- Length: 56:10
- Label: PUTS Records
- Producer: Thes One; Double K

People Under the Stairs chronology
Question in the Form of an Answer (2000)	American Men Vol. 1 (2000)	O.S.T. (2002)

American Men Vol. 1 is the first compilation album by People Under the Stairs. It is a combination of outtakes from the group's first two albums (The Next Step & Question in the Form of an Answer), songs produced for other local Los Angeles recording artists (including future Living Legends artists, Murs & Scarub), and one live track from the 2000 Glastonbury festival.

== Release ==
The album was self-produced and assembled by Thes One and Double K, and it was handed out at a small number of live shows during their 2000–2001 world tour in support of Question in the Form of an Answer.

Transportation among the various shows along the tour was not included in their tour deal, so People Under The Stairs were responsible for getting to each show, which meant carrying all their own equipment as well. Eventually, hauling the extra weight in merchandise (including the American Men Vol. 1 CDs) became too difficult, so midway through the tour, Thes One and Double K were forced to unload them in bulk on a middle-man who sold them to various stores in the United Kingdom.

As a result, while the group still considers it a part of their main discography, this compilation is the rarest and most sought-after album in the People Under The Stairs catalog.

== Track listing ==
All songs written by Christopher "Thes One" Portugal and Michael "Double K" Turner, except where noted.

No.	Title	Writer(s)	Length
1.	"Down And Out"		4:28
2.	"Rattlesnake"		3:47
3.	"Internet Time"		1:00
4.	"KPFK Radio Promo"		3:53
5.	"Lord Radio & Hale Bop"		2:12
6.	"Bobby In The Hood"		1:43
7.	"Kaos & Thes"		1:16
8.	"Dangerous"		4:00
9.	"Bobby On The Street"		1:23
10.	"Pulp Fiction (feat. Murs)"	C. Portugal, M. Turner, N. Carter	6:59
11.	"Untitled (feat. Scarub & Murs)"	C. Portugal, M. Turner, A. Collins, N. Carter	4:49
12.	"Blessed - Sam Spade"	Marlowe, C. Portugal, M. Turner	3:44
13.	"I'm Smiley - Smile-Oak"	W. West, C. Portugal, M. Turner	4:45
14.	"Knuckle Sandwich - Kidd Lexus"	B. Collins, C. Portugal, M. Turner	4:38
15.	"Choke A Mic Out - Kidd Lexus"	B. Collins, C. Portugal, M. Turner	3:39
16.	"Live At Glastenbury"		4:03

- Tracks 1–3 were outtakes from Question in the Form of an Answer (2000).
- Track 4 was an unused radio promo for a Los Angeles radio station (also known as "Underground Run" on later multi-artist compilations).
- Tracks 5–11 were outtakes from The Next Step (1998).
- Tracks 12–15 were PUTS-produced tracks for other recording artists.
- Track 16 was recorded live at the Glastonbury festival in the UK in front of 10,000 people. This is a live version of the b-side, "Live At The Fishbucket, Pt. 1", from the 12" single of "The Next Step II".
