= The Next Step (People Under the Stairs album) =

Studio album by People Under the Stairs
- Released: March 24, 1998
- Recorded: 1996–1998, Los Angeles, California
- Genre: Hip hop
- Length: 72:07
- Label: Om Records
- Producer: Thes One; Double K

People Under the Stairs chronology
The Next Step (1998)	Question in the Form of an Answer (2000)

Singles from The Next Step
- 1. "The Next Step II" Released: 1998

The Next Step is the debut studio album by People Under the Stairs, released on March 24, 1998. The duo was responsible for nearly every aspect of the album's production and initial release. Quick sales of the album and its sole single, "The Next Step II", also helped to get the group noticed by the label Om Records, with whom the group produced four other albums and found greater success.

== Background ==
After spending several months recording material and performing their first few shows in 1998, Thes One and Double K used Thes One's student loan funds to independently press and release their first 12-inch single, "The Next Step II". Just weeks after the single was released, the shopkeeper of the now-defunct Mr. Bongo record shop purchased a large number of copies of it for his shop. When he played it on an ordinary day in the store, customers rushed the counter and it sold out within minutes.

Impressed by the quick sale, Mr. Bongo's shopkeeper called Chris Smith, owner of Om Records in San Francisco, and urged him to get in contact with People Under The Stairs. Initially, Smith contacted the group regarding a one-song deal for Om's compilation albums Deep Concentration and Mushroom Jazz, but upon hearing more material, Smith offered the group a full contract.

== Recording ==
The album was self-recorded at Thes One's home on 2228 Cambridge Street in Los Angeles, California. Thes One and Double K used their personal recording equipment, including an E-mu SP-1200, an Akai MPC3000, and an 8-track ADAT digital tape recorder.

In 1996, when many of the songs were taking shape, Thes One and Double K were not actually planning on making a full-length hip hop album. They had just decided to make music for their own benefit. Eventually, as the amount of material they were creating grew (and at the urging of their friends), they changed their minds, had the album mastered, created their own artwork and self-released the album in the summer of 1998.

After being signed with Om, the label re-released The Next Step as the first album of a four-record deal. The self-released version of the CD came with a beedi in the spine, but this was omitted from the Om release.

Some of the outtakes from The Next Step were later released on the group's first compilation album, American Men Vol. 1.

== Reception ==
Professional ratings
Review scores
Source	Rating
AllMusic	2.5/5 stars
HypeMusic	8/10 stars
NME	7/10

After the release of the album in 1998, People Under The Stairs had a difficult time getting their record released, and many local DJs refused to play the album on their radio stations or during club events. One producer, DJ Vadim, even wrote a letter to Om Records to tell them they had made a mistake signing the band.

New York-based distribution company Phat Beats also refused to endorse the album because it did not sound "New York" enough. Despite initial difficulties, the group found friends in DJ Rob One and DJ Dusk, who helped them gain exposure in the Los Angeles area and planted the seeds of future success.

Reviews of the album were mixed. NME gave the album a positive review, saying that the group's strategy of personally funding and self-releasing the album "paid off" and that the lyrics are "pleasingly unpolished, intelligently raw". Allmusic praised the album as a "promising debut" and enjoyed "Death of a Salesman" but said that the album performed "within the boundaries of old".

The album had a much stronger showing overseas, which prompted People Under The Stairs to go on their first world tour following the release of the album.

Despite never being released as a single, "San Francisco Knights" quickly became a live favorite and a breakout cult classic for the group, and People Under The Stairs still perform it to this day. The song gave the group a little trouble when it was released, however; many casual fans believed that the group was from San Francisco, California. In reality, the song was written and recorded in 1996 to commemorate a fun visit to the city.

The track "The Next Step II" was later included in the 2003 video game Tony Hawk's Underground. The song samples the lyrics of "Movin' On Up", the opening theme of The Jeffersons.

== Track listing ==
All songs written by Christopher "Thes One" Portugal and Michael "Double K" Turner, except where noted.

No.	Title	Writer(s)	{{{extra_column}}}	Length
1.	"Intro/4 Everybody"			6:06
2.	"Death of a Salesman"			4:37
3.	"Hardcore"	C. Portugal, M. Turner, W. West	featuring Smile-Oak	4:35
4.	"Wannabes"			6:15
5.	"Ten Tough Guys"			3:23
6.	"Mid-City Fiesta"			4:29
7.	"Slow Bullet"			1:19
8.	"San Francisco Knights"			4:31
9.	"The Turndown"	C. Portugal, M. Turner, K. Witcher	featuring Assault	4:53
10.	"Time to Rock Our Shit"			4:25
11.	"The Tamburo 5"	C. Portugal, M. Turner, D. Walker, K. Witcher, C. Anderson	featuring Naimad, Assault and Shine 5	3:57
12.	"Los Angeles Daze"			6:20
13.	"The Next Step II"			3:45
14.	"D.A.R.E."			4:18
15.	"Asshole"	C. Portugal, M. Turner, K. Witcher	featuring Assault	4:47
16.	"Play It Again/Outro"			4:37
