= Highlighter (album) =

Studio album by People Under the Stairs
- Released: September 30, 2011
- Recorded: 2011, Los Angeles, California
- Genre: Hip hop
- Length: 72:04
- Labels: PL70 Records; PUTS Records
- Producers: Thes One; Double K

People Under the Stairs chronology
Carried Away (2009)	Highlighter (2011)	12 Step Program (2014)

Professional ratings
Review scores
Source	Rating
Consequence of Sound	C+
The Find Mag	(positive)
HipHopSite.com	4/4 stars
KevinNottingham.com	8/10 stars
Treble	(positive)

Highlighter is the eighth album by the People Under the Stairs, and the band's first released with Thes One's artist-cooperative label, Piecelock 70. With the exception of an iTunes-only EP, the album was released without accompanying singles or music videos. In the months following the release of Highlighter, PUTS embarked on yet another tour in support of the album.

== Background ==
Still disappointed with the way that the various record labels had handled the duo's albums and accompanying promotion during the first decade of their career, Thes One made the decision after Carried Away to take complete control of the production process for the group's albums from start-to-finish. Thes One also decided to release all new material under a new worker cooperative business entity and label, Piecelock 70 (also styled as PL70).

== Recording ==
Now free of the demands of a label, People Under the Stairs were able to stretch themselves artistically and control all the decisions about the released product. Like Stepfather, the album was one of the more experimental releases for the group, employing alternate time-signatures, live instrumentation, and even a string section. The album's material is also broken equally into 10-track "sides": the "High" and the "Lighter" sides.

PUTS also decided to continue with their tradition of using a wider array of samples than the standard obscure or jazz-based samples found in the majority of sample-based hip hop. The group sampled several popular artists because they felt that they should be choosing music that a large portion of fans may have listened to as youths. In their opinion, recognizing a sample source is part of the excitement of discovering hip hop, and that may have been lost in the race to find obscure records.

== Release ==
In addition to the usual release on CD and on iTunes, the group also produced a limited release of the full album on double vinyl. Only 2000 copies were pressed, and the records included yellow highlighter-colored, streaked 180-g vinyl, heavy-cardboard casing (reminiscent of pre-digital era releases), and a foil-stamped, die-cut tear strip.

Highlighter was the first commercially released album to ever be released with a digital download in 24-bit HD-AAC format. In addition to the 24-bit files, consumers also received Serato-tagged 320 kbit/s MP3 files. Thes One decided to release the album in the new HD-AAC format after attending an Audio Engineering Society convention, meeting with the Fraunhofer Society, and reading a white paper on the new format. With the 16-bit compact disc becoming increasingly obsolete in a digital market, Thes One felt that it would break new ground for the recording industry.

During the first few days of the album's release, the servers providing the music files crashed several times due to high demand and the large file size, but reception to the sound quality and the album was positive.

== Touring ==
After the release of Highlighter in September 2011, People Under the Stairs closed out the year on tour with Mac Miller (on his Blue Slide Park tour) and Girl Talk, and continued with a world tour in 2012 in support of the album.

== Track listing ==
All songs written by Christopher "Thes One" Portugal and Michael "Double K" Turner, except where noted.

No.	Title	Writer(s)	Length
1.	"Selfish Destruction"		3:53
2.	"The Second Track"		3:18
3.	"Can't Hold It Back"		3:42
4.	"Talkin' Back To The Streets"		4:30
5.	"At The House"		3:25
6.	"Too Much Birthday"		3:19
7.	"We Got It"		2:04
8.	"The Time Bandit"		2:55
9.	"Foolish People"		3:59
10.	"Ascension To Nowhere"		3:37
11.	"Uprock Boogie"		3:53
12.	"Electric Tookie"		3:57
13.	"This Lifetime"		4:04
14.	"Cookie's Theme"		3:57
15.	"Dewrit!"		4:56
16.	"Mean Spirited"		2:58
17.	"Sonic Elders"	C. Portugal, M. Turner, E.L. Parsonage	1:45
18.	"WRLA"		3:11
19.	"Left Foot, Right Foot"		2:45
20.	"Ambien Hallway Music"		6:06
