= Matt Bird =

Australian film director

Matt Bird is an Australian film director.

== Biography ==
Matt Bird is a Sydney-based director who in February 2013 became the first filmmaker to be selected as a Tropfest finalist for 3 consecutive years, the world’s largest short film festival.

The three films were ‘Taser’ (2013) starring Firass Dirani, ‘Min Min’ (2012) and ‘A Desperate Deed’ (2011), which won Best Editing and Best Original Score.

Bird’s notoriety as a director began in 2000 when he wrote, directed and produced the indie feature 'Blue Neon' during his final year of film studies at the University of Technology, Sydney. Triple J radio film critic Peter Castaldi declared at the time: "Australian screens need a future and this is it!" Bird was then invited as one of eight award-winning directors to make a film for POV 2002, from a script by celebrated writer Brendan Cowell. Bird's film 'The Doppelgangers' told the story of a woman haunted by horrific visions of her lover's double, and starred AFI Award Winner Pia Miranda.

After meeting producer/MC Thes One of People Under The Stairs, Bird directed the Los Angeles hip-hop duo's debut music video "The Wiz" in 2008. He has also directed music videos for ARIA Award winner's Bliss N Eso and operates Chesterfilm, a film & TV production company based in Sydney.

In 2011, Bird's thriller 'Cold Sore', starring Saskia Burmeister and Henry Nixon, travelled the international film festival circuit and won Best Short Film at the Indie Spirit Film Festival, and Best Story Line at the Boston International Film Festival. The film had its UK Premiere at the 65th Edinburgh International Film Festival.

In addition to his 3 Tropfest films, Bird also made 'The Exchange' for the APRA Tropscore competition in 2013, in which composers were invited to write a score for Bird’s film.

== Filmography ==
- Taser (2013)
- The Exchange (2013)
- Min Min (2012)
- A Desperate Deed (2011)
- Cold Sore (2010)
- Making the Wiz (2008)
- The Fatal Blow (2005)
- Stuffed Bunny (2002)
- The Doppelgangers (2002)
- Blue Neon (2001)
