= O.S.T. (album) =

Studio album by People Under the Stairs
- Released: June 4, 2002
- Recorded: 2001–2002, Los Angeles, California
- Genre: Hip hop
- Length: 76:14
- Label: Om Records
- Producer: Thes One; Double K

People Under the Stairs chronology
American Men Vol. 1 (2000)	O.S.T. (2002)	...Or Stay Tuned (2003)

Singles from O.S.T.
- 1. "Jappy Jap" Released: March 9, 2002; 2. "O.S.T. (Original Soundtrack)" Released: 2002; 3. "Acid Raindrops" Released: 2002

O.S.T. is the third album by the People Under the Stairs. The album was again produced in Thes One's home entirely by the duo, and it was finally released on June 4, 2002 on Om Records. The album produced three singles, including "Acid Raindrops", one of the group's most successful songs and a staple at live shows.

== Background ==
During 2001, while on tour in Europe, Thes One and Double K had been utilizing their tour income and their Question... album profits to steadily amass a large supply of vinyl. The group would purchase rare and interesting records at local record stores in each city they would pass through, even going to far as to spend over $2,000 at a store in Stockholm, Sweden. Many of these records would form the basis for the sampling used in O.S.T.

In between tour dates, Thes One and Double K returned to Thes One's home in Los Angeles and create samples using this new-found material. Through the success on tour, they also came to terms with the criticism and indifference that they had been receiving from the local L.A. hip hop scene, and the new lyrics in their songs reflected their new-found life experience. Using the samples and the insight they had gained from touring, Thes One and Double K began piecing together their third album.

== Recording ==
O.S.T. proved to be even more complex than the group's first albums, using a larger variety of samples (culled from vinyl collected all over the world), and the samples were pieced together in more intricate ways. For example, the track "Montego Slay" used over 20 minuscule sections of music from Jamaican tourist souvenir records, cut and reorganized seamlessly into a new rhythm. The group also used live instrumentation for the first time on a release by having musician and producer Headnodic (of the groups Crown City Rockers and The Mighty Underdogs) play electric bass on the album-ending "The Breakdown".

The album contains several dedications, both positive and negative. The "Suite For Beaver" was created, in true "jazz ode" style, as a dedication to Willie Hale (also known as "Little Beaver"), whose album Party Down was the source of the base samples in the "Suite". Thes One has stated that the album and the mellow party vibe theme hold a central place in the album's creation and the band's outlook ever since. The song "Tales of Kidd Drunkadelic" is also a reference to the album Tales of Kidd Funkadelic by Funkadelic, one of Double K's favorite groups.

On a more infamous note, the song "The Outrage" contains a (humorous) threat of violence to Los Angeles Weekly author Oliver "O-Dub" Wang: "I got my piece under the seat for any Oliver mark-ass t'Wang, call up the homie O-Dub, said it’s time to bring pain". This lyric stems from PUTS's upset after reading Wang's 2000 article "Roll With the New" after he wrote an essay that they perceived as critical of the tone of their previous album Question in the Form of an Answer. After the release of O.S.T. came out, People Under the Stairs sent an advance copy of the album to Wang, with more disses written on the album cover. Wang eventually spoke with Thes One and learned the source of the group's anger, and the two are now good friends.

The track "The Dig" also apparently seemed to contain a negative reference to Madlib (who also referred to himself as "Tha Loopdigga") in the lyrics "fuck a loop digger in my city, man, just stay home", and many on the L.A. music scene were incensed. However, Thes One claims to have been unaware of Madlib's alternate name and had meant to aim the lyric at hip hop sampling artists who were not interested or engaged in the music they were sampling or the history behind it.

The picture used for the front cover was taken on Cambridge Street in Los Angeles, one block away from Thes One's house of eight years, where the majority of the first five albums were recorded, including O.S.T.

== Reception and touring ==
Professional ratings
Review scores
Source	Rating
AllMusic	4/5 stars
Pitchfork Media	7.7/10

Upon its release, the album received positive reviews and significantly more attention than the group's two previous albums. AllMusic named O.S.T. as one of their "album picks" and called it "one fun and funky record" and "one of the more enjoyable hip-hop releases of 2002". Pitchfork Media felt that the lyrical side of the album lacked depth ("and there is absolutely nothing wrong with that"), yet still called the album "a testament to the enduring strength of straight-up, no-frills hip-hop".

Later in 2003, a minor controversy occurred when the primary music sample for "Acid Raindrops," Lay Lady Lay by David T. Walker, was found to have also been used on a song, "What You Say", recorded by New York hip hop group INI. While re-use of a common sample is generally not taboo within hip hop, sampling of less-common material is sometimes viewed as unoriginal. "What You Say" was recorded in 1995, well before the release of O.S.T., but the song was not released until Pete Rock included it on his compilation Lost & Found in November 2003, more than a year after O.S.T.. Thes One has stated that "Acid Raindrops" might have not been released if he had been aware of INI's use of the sample, but due to People Under The Stairs being unaware of the song's existence at the time of the album's release, they do not put much stock in the controversy, believing both songs to be well-made and legitimate originals.

Nevertheless, "Acid Raindrops" and "The L.A. Song" quickly became fan favorites during the supporting tour for the album, and both songs are still performed by the band live regularly. Almost a decade later, "Acid Raindrops" became the subject of a skate deck design contest, and was still the most popular song of the group on iTunes.

In the fall of 2002, PUTS supported the release of O.S.T. by playing at the prestigious Reading and Leeds Festivals, and also by taking part in the second-annual US Cali-Comm hip-hop tour with Del the Funky Homosapien, KutMasta Kurt, Planet Asia, and the Lifesavas.

== Track listing ==
All songs written by Christopher "Thes One" Portugal and Michael "Double K" Turner, except where noted.

No.	Title	Writer(s)	Length
1.	"Intro"		4:15
2.	"Jappy Jap"		3:47
3.	"The Suite For Beaver, Pt 1"		4:26
4.	"The Suite For Beaver, Pt 2"		4:06
5.	"O.S.T. (Original Soundtrack) (feat. Odell)"	C. Portugal, M. Turner, O. Johnson	5:13
6.	"Empty Bottles Of Water"		3:29
7.	"Jim Sr."		0:46
8.	"The Outrage"		4:32
9.	"The Hang Loose"		4:02
10.	"The Double K Show"		3:24
11.	"Tales Of Kidd Drunkadelic"		3:03
12.	"Keepin It Live"		4:36
13.	"The Dig"		3:44
14.	"The Heat"		0:59
15.	"Montego Slay"		4:12
16.	"The L.A. Song"		4:27
17.	"8 Is Enuff"		3:10
18.	"Acid Raindrops (feat. Camel MC)"		4:56
19.	"The Joyride"		4:07
20.	"The Breakdown (feat. Headnodic on bass)"	C. Portugal, M. Turner, E.L. Parsonage	5:00
