= Ming (DJ) =

MING
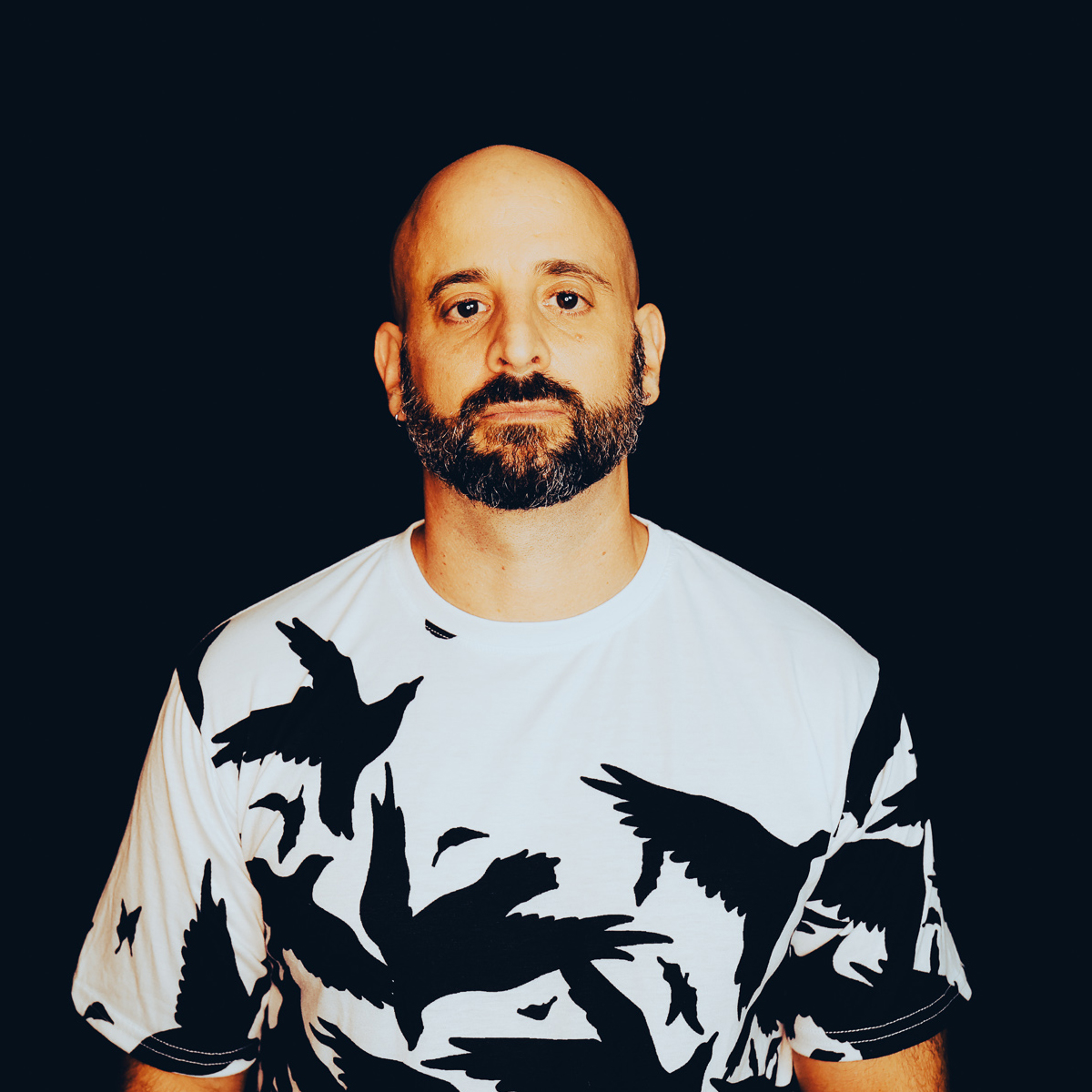
- MING (Aaron Albano), Grammy-nominated American DJ and record producer

Background information
- Also known as: Until the Dawn, ARTWERQ
- Born: Aaron Albano; January 1, 1972 (age 54)
- Origin: Stony Brook, New York, United States
- Genres: House, tech house, drum and bass, hip hop, turntablism, electro house, lo-fi
- Occupations: Disc jockey, record producer, songwriter, audio engineer
- Instruments: synthesizer, drum machine, music sequencer, turntables, guitar, bass guitar, keyboards, personal computer
- Years active: 1995–present
- Labels: Om Records, Dim Mak Records, Spun Records, Hood Famous Music, Firepower Records, Mau5trap, B4 AFTR, Lofiction Records, Mother Recordings
- Website: www.mingsmusic.com

Aaron Albano (born January 1, 1972), better known by his stage name MING, is a Grammy Award-nominated American DJ, record producer, songwriter, and multi-instrumentalist based in New York City. Over a career spanning more than three decades, MING has moved across genre boundaries — from the experimental hip-hop and drum and bass scenes of the 1990s, through the commercial EDM era of the 2000s and 2010s, to an ongoing career rooted in house music, label ownership, and electronic music broadcasting. He holds a Bachelor of Science in Electrical Engineering with an emphasis in audio from the University of Miami.

== Early life ==
Albano was born in Syosset, New York, and grew up in Stony Brook, New York, where he attended Ward Melville High School. He went on to study at the University of Miami, graduating with honors with a Bachelor of Science in Electrical Engineering with a specialization in audio — a technical foundation that would inform his later work as a producer and mix engineer.

== MING+FS and the early electronic scene (1996–2005) ==
In 1996, Albano co-founded the experimental hip-hop and turntablist duo MING+FS alongside producer FS, establishing the group's base of operations at Madhattan Studios in New York City. The duo became a defining act of the late-1990s American electronic underground, developing a self-described genre they called "junkyard" — a fusion of breakbeats, drum and bass, electro, and house that reflected New York's eclectic club culture. The term was picked up by the dance music press and appeared on several of their releases, including the 1998 EP Junkyard Drum 'n' Bass.

Albano played guitar, bass, keyboards, and turntables throughout the duo's output, distinguishing MING+FS from many of their contemporaries in the turntablist scene. The pair performed over 1,000 shows across the United States and internationally, sharing stages with artists including Sting, RUN-DMC, and Moby, and performing at major festivals such as Coachella, Jam Cruise, and Jazz Fest. They released three studio albums on San Francisco-based Om Records — Hell's Kitchen (1999), The Human Condition (2001), and Subway Series (2002) — as well as the five-song EP Applied Pressure on Sound Gizmo Records, a fourth album Back to One on New York-based Spun Records, and numerous singles on their own Madhattan Studios imprint.

In 2003, Albano co-wrote five songs on Toby Lightman's debut album Little Things, released on Lava Records.

== Solo career and production work (2006–2015) ==
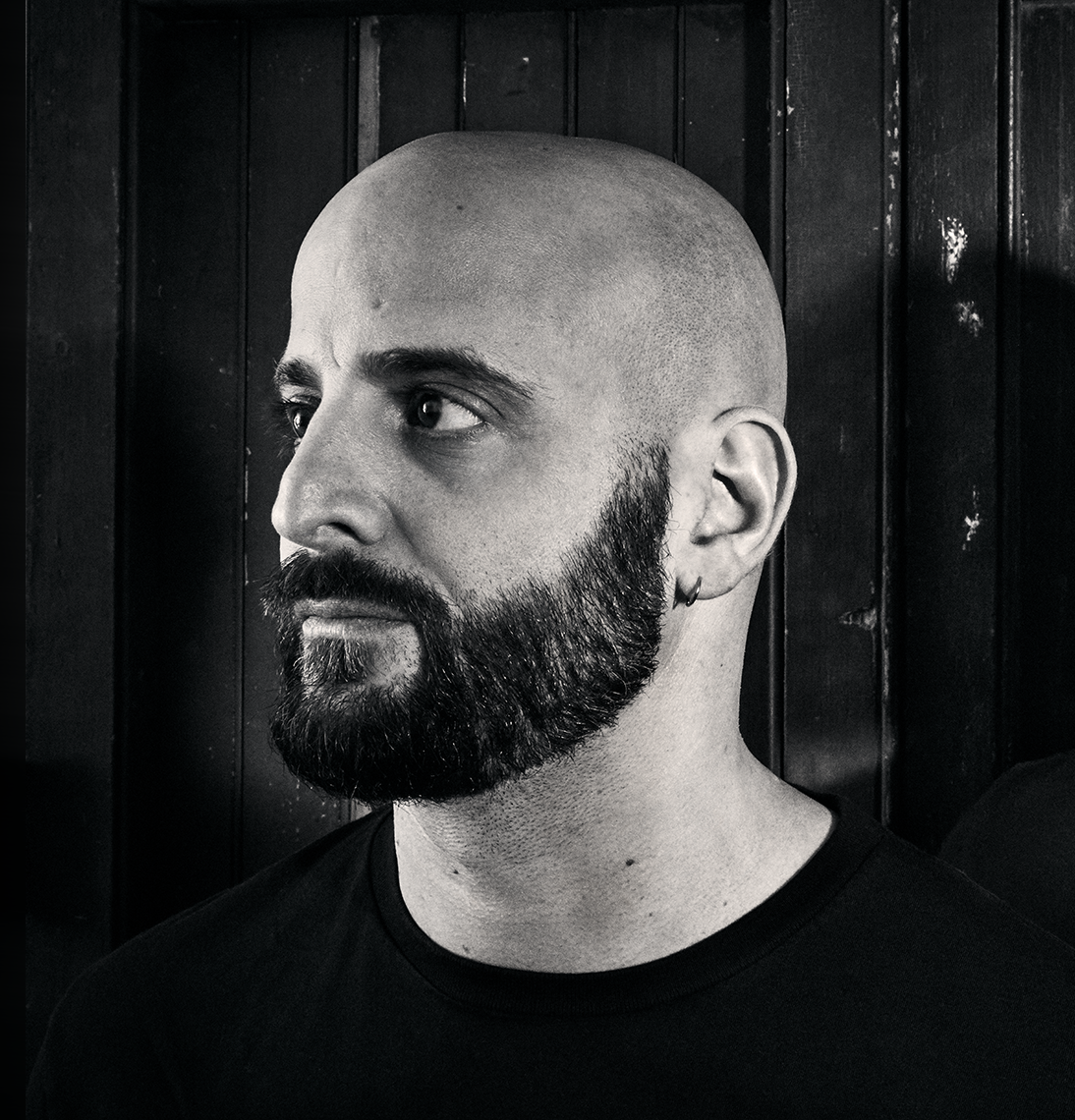
MING (Aaron Albano), New York-based DJ and record producer

Following the conclusion of MING+FS, Albano shifted his focus to production and songwriting. In 2006, he launched Hood Famous Music (HFM), a New York-based record label and music production company co-run with producer Jumpshot. In 2007, he opened Habitat Music, a production company dedicated to music for film and television. Through Habitat Music, MING produced original scores and licensed tracks for television series including CSI: NY, CSI: Miami, Sex and the City, and Weeds, as well as commercial work for brands including Sears, Nissan, Burger King, Nokia, AT&T, Doritos, and Chevrolet. Working with FS, he also contributed a song to the anime Boogiepop Phantom.

In 2010, MING wrote a monthly column in Electronic Musician magazine titled "Production Central," focused on record production technique, and hosted an accompanying monthly video series on ElectronicMusician.com featuring artist interviews and recording tutorials.

As a remixer, MING built a substantial body of commercial work, producing remixes for Beyoncé, Lady Gaga, Katy Perry, Black Eyed Peas, and Ellie Goulding, among others. He also developed artist Michael Lynche (Big Mike), a fourth-place finalist on Season 9 of American Idol, whose track "What Would You Say" was licensed for the film Madea Goes to Jail.

In 2012, MING released the King Kong EP on Steve Aoki's Dim Mak Records as MING+2beeps, and collaborated with Le Castle Vania on "Disintegration," released on deadmau5's Mau5trap label. In 2014, he released the trap-influenced Blackout EP on Datsik's Firepower Records and simultaneously placed four Top 40 remixes on the Beatport chart. In 2015, he received a Grammy Award nomination for Best Remixed Recording, Non-Classical for his remix of "Crossfingers – Falling Out" featuring Danny Losito.

== MING Presents Warmth and broadcasting (2016–present) ==
In 2016, MING launched the weekly syndicated mix-show MING Presents Warmth, initially broadcast on Dash Radio, di.fm, and Future.fm, with mixes also appearing on Music Choice. The show evolved from an earlier weekly program, the Hood Famous Music Podcast (2012–2014), and a subsequent show called Destroy All Genres. By 2017, Warmth had expanded to more than 38 FM and online syndications, reaching over 2.8 million monthly listeners, with the podcast accumulating close to ten thousand subscriptions. The show has continued as an active weekly broadcast with over 500 episodes as of 2025.

During this period, MING also released singles "Paralyzed" and "Honestly" on Sony Brazil, which jointly accumulated more than 2.5 million Spotify streams, and maintained an active live schedule through a residency at Hornblower Cruises in New York City.

== Current projects and label ventures ==
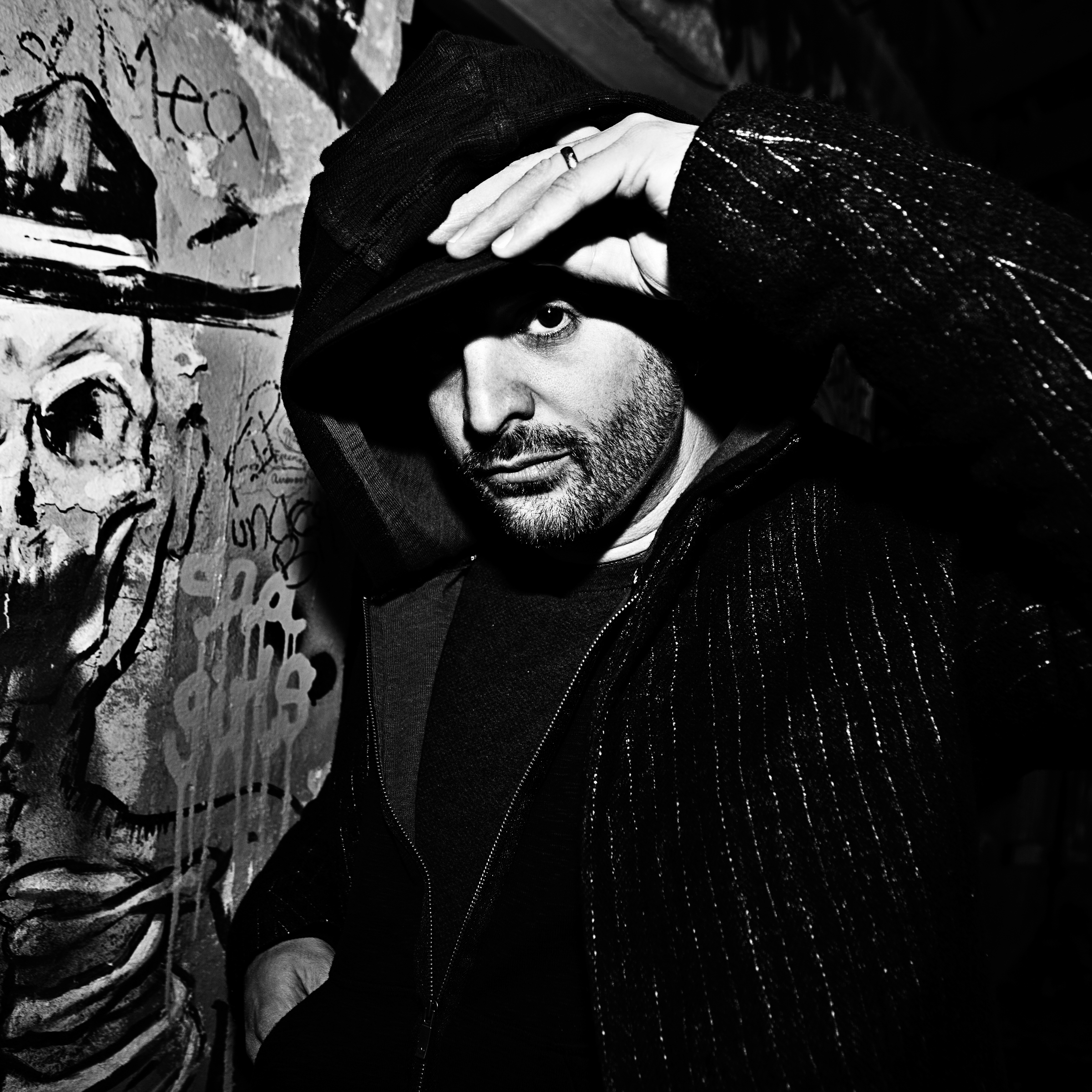
Aaron Albano as his drum and bass alias Until the Dawn

Albano continues to work across multiple projects and ventures. His house music collaborative project ARTWERQ, formed with Blaqwell (Jamel Rankins) — a producer and graphic designer with releases on Toolroom, Simma Black, and Brobot Records — released "This Is Life" featuring Art Hays on Mother Recordings in 2025, a track that received support from DJs and radio programmers across Europe and the United States.

Under the alias Until the Dawn, Albano has returned to drum and bass — the genre that shaped his earliest work with MING+FS in the 1990s — releasing new material as an ongoing side project.

As a label executive, Albano co-owns B4 AFTR with Jeff Straw, and owns Lofiction Records, a lo-fi music imprint. Together with the long-running Hood Famous Music, he operates three active record labels spanning house, lo-fi, and electronic music.

== Selected discography ==
=== As MING+FS ===
- Hell's Kitchen (1999, Om Records)
- The Human Condition (2001, Om Records)
- Subway Series (2002, Om Records)
- Back to One (Spun Records)

=== As MING (selected releases) ===
- King Kong EP (2012/2013, Dim Mak Records)
- Blackout EP (2014, Firepower Records)
- "Paralyzed" / "Honestly" (Sony Brazil)
- "Underground Sound" (Hood Famous Music)

=== As ARTWERQ (with Blaqwell) ===
- "This Is Life" feat. Art Hays (2025, Mother Recordings)
