= FS (musician) =

American DJ

FS (real name Fred Sargolini) is an American dubstep producer and DJ from New York City. He is the founding owner of Patriarch Recordings, a record label and creative agency, for which he produces independent artists and scores music for TV and film. In 2011 he released the Touch O Klass EP on Play Me Records, and both "Yup" and "Touch O Klass" reached #1 on the Beatport Top 100 Dubstep Chart. As part of Ming + FS, he broke ground with Hell's Kitchen, and continued to release four, full-length albums and over thirty 12" singles and remixes for Om Records, Spun Records and Madhattan Studios (owned and operated by Ming + FS). His alter ego, The Arch Cupcake, also saw success with the release of Box of Bees featuring "Wasabi" used in a Chrysler commercial and MTV's Making the Band 4.
