= Question in the Form of an Answer =

Studio album by People Under the Stairs
- Released: June 6, 2000
- Recorded: 1999–2000, Los Angeles, California
- Genre: Hip hop
- Length: 73:41
- Label: Om Records
- Producers: Thes One; Double K

People Under the Stairs chronology
The Next Step (1998)	Question in the Form of an Answer (2000)	American Men Vol. 1 (2000)

Singles from Question in the Form of an Answer
- 1. "Youth Explosion" Released: 2000; 2. "The Cat" Released: 2000; 3. "We'll Be There" Released: November 2000

Question in the Form of an Answer is the second studio album by the People Under the Stairs. Recorded following their first world tour, the album was their first release on Om Records (the label would later re-release the duo's first album the following year). The release spawned three singles, each selling their entire first pressing run of 15,000 copies, and a second world tour.

== Background ==
In 1999, People Under The Stairs signed a four-album deal with Om Records, and the title of their second album, Question in the Form of an Answer, came to them while driving up to San Francisco to meet with the Om staff. Om offered them a cash advance on the record deal, and the group immediately went to a local record store, Groove Merchant, and used the money to buy a large number of records, several of which would contain samples that wound up being used on the record.

== Recording ==
Planned as a logical extension of their first record, Question in the Form of an Answer opened with the same music sample that the previous album closed on. Also similar to the first album, Question... was self-recorded at Thes One's Los Angeles home, and utilized the same instrumentation - namely, Thes One's Akai MPC3000 and Double K's E-mu SP-1200.

Despite the similarities, the music departed from the sound of the debut album. Thes One and Double K's knowledge of sampling techniques had grown during the intervening years between the first two albums, and the music on their second release contained more complex filtering techniques, sound manipulation, and analogue recording techniques. "Earth Travelers", the first music track made for the album, incorporates a large number of layers, including high- and low-pass filters, resonance, horn loops, and drum loops. The creation of a portion of the track can be seen on the bonus DVD which accompanies PUTS' 2006 release Stepfather.

The lyrics also toned down the more aggressive themes and battle rap sensibilities of their first album, and instead, the rhymes covered topics including record collecting, recreational drinking and marijuana use (which was at its peak for the group during the recording of this album), and making music. This album also contained fewer guest MCs than The Next Step, and every record since Question... has continued this practice.

In the same manner as "San Francisco Knights" from the group's first album, People Under The Stairs decided to include a true personal story, "July 3rd", on their second release as well. On July 3, 1999, Thes One was hit by a minivan while crossing the street at the corner of W 3rd St and S Hobart Blvd in Los Angeles, and the driver of the minivan attempted to kidnap him and drive away. Several bystanders, including a video store security guard, stopped the man, and a bloodied Thes One was taken to the hospital.

This album is the only People Under The Stairs release to contain a hidden track. The hidden track on this album consists of two minutes of "shout outs" to friends and fellow hip hop artists.

== Reception ==
Professional ratings
Review scores
Source	Rating
AllMusic	3/5 stars
Entertainment Weekly	B+
PopMatters	(favorable)

The album received positive, but subdued, reviews upon its release. Entertainment Weekly called the album "intelligent and funky", and AllMusic dubbed Question... "a very solid hip-hop album from top to bottom". PopMatters was much more enthusiastic in its review, calling PUTS' second album "a thoroughly fresh celebration of hip-hop" and "a funky blast of fresh air".

== Track listing ==
All songs written by Christopher "Thes One" Portugal and Michael "Double K" Turner, except where noted.

No.	Title	Writer(s)	Length
1.	"Intro"		1:48
2.	"Crazy Live"		3:26
3.	"Youth Explosion"		4:39
4.	"Suite For Creeper"		3:46
5.	"Sterns To Western (feat. Capn’ Kidd Lexus)"	C. Portugal, M. Turner, B. Collins	3:56
6.	"Code Check"		3:36
7.	"Blowin Wax"		4:35
8.	"Give Love A Chance"		4:30
9.	"Stoned Youth Truth"		0:18
10.	"Yehaw Partystyles"		2:45
11.	"Get Drunk"		0:35
12.	"43 Labels I Like"		1:50
13.	"King Kuff"		0:46
14.	"E Business (feat. JazMak)"	C. Portugal, M. Turner, A. Satchel	4:38
15.	"Zignaflyinblow"		2:18
16.	"July 3rd"		3:51
17.	"Stay Home"		3:21
18.	"Earth Travelers"		4:34
19.	"The Cat"		3:44
20.	"Electric Laddy"		0:15
21.	"We’ll Be There"		5:26
22.	"Fredly Advice†"		8:16

†The track "Fredly Advice" is only 1:46, with a hidden bonus track occurring at the 6-minute mark.
