= ...Or Stay Tuned =

Studio album by People Under the Stairs
- Released: August 19, 2003
- Recorded: 2001–2003, Los Angeles, California
- Genre: Hip hop
- Length: 42:45
- Label: Om Records
- Producers: Thes One; Double K

People Under the Stairs chronology
O.S.T. (2002)	...Or Stay Tuned (2003)	Stepfather (2006)

Singles from ...Or Stay Tuned
- 1. "Yield" Released: 2003

...Or Stay Tuned is the fourth studio album by the People Under the Stairs and their final release on Om Records until 2009's Carried Away. The group's shortest album (clocking in at only 43 minutes), it was originally marketed as an EP release and called a "mini-album" in the liner notes. In the years since the album's release, the group has counted it among their main album catalog, as it was released on double-vinyl and meets the criteria for being full-length. The album also produced one single, "Yield".

== Background ==
Contractually, People Under The Stairs had one more album to complete with Om. After receiving a funding advance for the final album with Om, Thes One purchased a Neve 5116/32 mixing console, and in the space of a couple weeks in June, the group finished recording several tracks. After looking through their outtakes from the previous album, O.S.T., People Under The Stairs realized that they had enough unheard material (including the newly created tracks) to issue another release.

The final album contained five songs recorded as early as 2001, plus six new tracks. The only previously released track on the album was a remix of "O.S.T. (Original Soundtrack)". Other "remixes" for the album included a very-short, a cappella rendition of a piece of "San Francisco Knights" and a completely re-imagined version of "The L.A. Song" which presented a much more serious and tragic view of the city.

== Reception ==
Professional ratings
Review scores
Source	Rating
AllMusic	4/5 stars

Much like "Acid Raindrops" on their previous album, O.S.T., the song "Outrun" proved to be a hit with fans, with its Wesley Willis-tribute chorus and record scratching by Double K.

AllMusic gave the album four out of five stars, complimented PUTS' D.I.Y. attitude, and called ...Or Stay Tuned "highly recommended". The tracks "Drumbox", "OST Remix" and "Outrun" were also selected to appear in the video game ESPN NFL 2K5 as optional menu and stadium music.

== Track listing ==
All songs written by Christopher "Thes One" Portugal and Michael "Double K" Turner.

No.	Title	Length
1.	"Yield"	3:47
2.	"Plunken' Em"	4:20
3.	"Roadbeaters"	4:11
4.	"Fly Love Song"	5:48
5.	"Drumbox"	4:08
6.	"OST Remix"	4:13
7.	"Yo"	3:56
8.	"LA Song (Sensitive Mix)"	5:04
9.	"SF Knights Remix"	0:38
10.	"Take The Fruit"	3:11
11.	"Outrun"	3:29

Additional tracks

- The vinyl & Japanese CD releases of the album separate out the skit "Church" from the end of "Fly Love Song".
- The Japanese release of the album also includes three additional tracks:

- "R&B", 0:23 (a brief interlude between "Church" and "Drumbox")
- "Hangloose Pt 2 (bonus track)", 4:23 (after "Outrun"; also known as "Hang Loose, Pt. 2")
- "Fishbucket (bonus track)", 3:28 (after "Hangloose Pt 2"; also known as "Live At The Fishbucket, Pt. 2")
