= Carried Away (People Under the Stairs album) =

Studio album by People Under the Stairs
- Released: October 13, 2009
- Recorded: 2009, Los Angeles, California
- Genre: Hip hop
- Length: 59:53 (CD), 65:13 (LP)
- Label: Om Records
- Producer: Thes One; Double K

People Under the Stairs chronology
Fun DMC (2008)	Carried Away (2009)	Highlighter (2011)

Singles from Carried Away
- 1. "Trippin' At The Disco" Released: September 15, 2009; 2. "Beer" Released: December 14, 2010; 3. "Down In L.A." Released: 2011

Alternate cover
- 12" LP Record cover

Carried Away is the seventh studio album by People Under the Stairs. The group chose to release the album on the independent label, Om Records, which they had last been on for 2003's ...Or Stay Tuned. The album is a mixture of the Golden age hip hop sound of their earlier Om releases, and a continuation of the more expansive sample-sourcing of their last two albums. Carried Away produced three singles and two music videos, and the album continued the tradition of a steady stream of positive reviews for the group.

== Background ==
In the first months of 2009, the group toured constantly to support their latest release, Fun DMC. They became one of the first independent music groups to tour China, and they also received positive concert reviews when they appeared on the opening days of both the Coachella Music Festival in April and the Bonnaroo Music Festival in June. Feeling inspired by their touring success, the group immediately returned to the studio following their Bonnaroo concert to begin recording more tracks, bucking their usual trend of waiting a year and a half between full-album releases.

== Recording ==
Due to a production backlog, Gold Dust Media would be unable to release a follow-up album to Fun DMC with the speed the group had hoped for, so PUTS made a return to the Om Records label for Carried Away. Om also offered the group extra incentives, including obtaining licensing from Colt 45 to use their branding and Billy Dee Williams' image on PUTS' first 7-inch single from the new album, "Beer". PUTS also teamed with the Vans shoe company to produce a limited-edition skate deck and a remix contest for the song "Hit The Top".

While the group has always been known for its shout-outs of other musicians from a large array of artists across several genres, this album produced some of its most direct homages yet. For instance, the song "Check The Vibe" was a clear parody of A Tribe Called Quest, created after the group discovered a vinyl record with an organ sample that sounded like it could have come from The Low End Theory. Double K also imitates various classic hip hop artists, such as Melle Mel and Shock G, at various points across the album, and the group includes an extended shout-out sequence at the end of the vinyl-only track, "All Good Things". Finally, the song "Creepshow" uses a stalker-ish phone call sample made famous by The Pharcyde in their song "4 Better Or 4 Worse".

The album also includes the usual array of People Under The Stairs "themed" tracks: odes to L.A. ("80 Blocks From Silverlake", "Down In L.A."), food and alcohol ("Chicken Kebap", "Beer"), marijuana ("Come On, Let's Get High"), classic hip hop ("Letter From The Old School", "Check The Vibe"), and the music industry ("DQMOT", "All Good Things").

The packaging for Carried Away included a humorous board game, and CD copies of the album included a lanyard tag to wear at shows for free merchandise. Vinyl copies of the album included two bonus tracks, the skit "Lutherfest" and "All Good Things". Om also offered a "deluxe" preorder that included both formats of the album, the skateboard deck and the "Beer" single.

== Reception and Touring ==
Professional ratings
Review scores
Source	Rating
AllMusic	3.5/5 stars
HypeMusic	8.5/10 stars
PopMatters	7/10 stars

Carried Away debuted at #5 on the iTunes hip hop charts and was featured by iTunes, who noted: "As usual with PUTS, Carried Away is a self-contained effort with no guest producers or MC cameos, just entertaining rhymes and straightforward beatwork dotted with well-placed samples meant to delight hip-hop purists everywhere." The album also debuted on Billboard's "Heatseeker" Chart at #23. The Onion AV club review, in a positive review, noted that "Carried Away proves that Thes One and Double K will be pumping out sunny, laid-back party anthems long after the Internet memes grow stale".

Though demand to tour the US following the release of Carried Away was strong, PUTS embarked on another world tour following the release of Carried Away, determined to visit areas they had not been in previously, such as Brazil and then the southern cape of Africa.

Like "San Francisco Knights", "Acid Raindrops" and "Montego Slay", two tracks from Carried Away quickly became live favorites: "Beer" and "Trippin At The Disco", and the group still performs the songs regularly at concerts.

== Track listing ==
All songs written by Christopher "Thes One" Portugal and Michael "Double K" Turner.

No.	Title	Length
1.	"Step Off"	3:14
2.	"Much Too Much"	3:40
3.	"Hit The Top"	3:50
4.	"Listen"	3:40
5.	"Trippin' At The Disco"	4:12
6.	"80 Blocks From Silverlake"	4:02
7.	"Beer"	3:37
8.	"Come On, Let's Get High"	4:56
9.	"Check The Vibe"	3:31
10.	"Letter From The Old School"	2:17
11.	"DQMOT"	3:32
12.	"Down In LA"	4:03
13.	"My Boy D"	4:01
14.	"Teeth"	1:21
15.	"Creepshow"	4:02
16.	"Chicken Kebap"	1:44
17.	"Carried Away"	4:19

Additional tracks (exclusive to double-LP release)

- "Lutherfest" (1:07) - located between "DQMOT" and "Down in LA"
- "All Good Things" (4:36) - located between "Chicken Kebap" and "Carried Away" (the interlude following "Chicken Kebap" on the CD is located after "All Good Things" on the LP)
