= People Under the Stairs =

American former hip hop duo

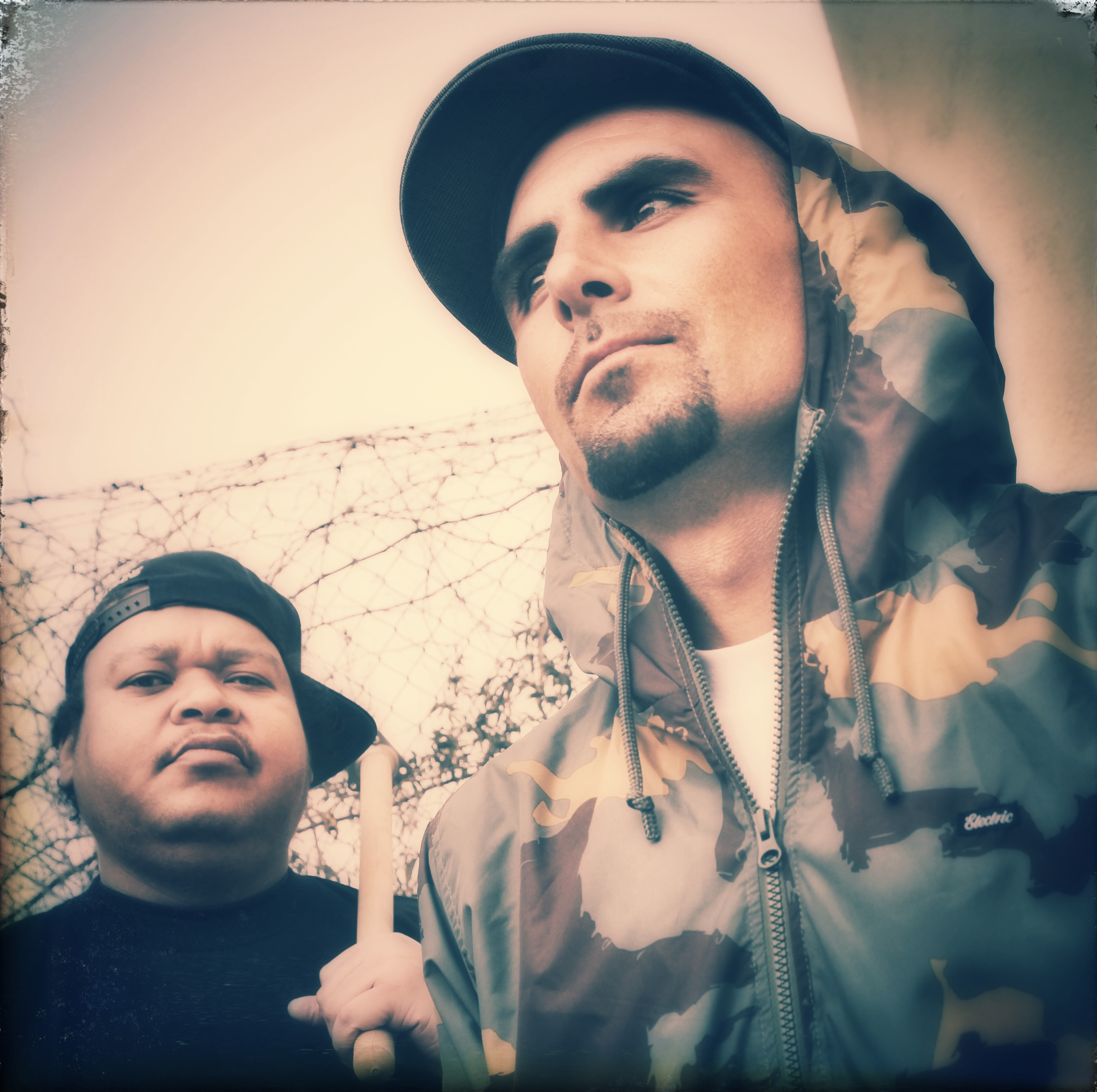
- Double K (left) and Thes One (right)

Background information
- Origin: Los Angeles, California, United States
- Genres: Hip hop
- Years active: 1997–2019
- Labels: PUTS Records; PL70 Records; Tres Records; Om Records; Gold Dust Media
- Members: Thes One; Double K (deceased)
- Website: www.puts.band

People Under the Stairs was an American hip hop duo from Los Angeles, California, formed in 1997 and disbanded in 2019. Since their inception, the group consisted solely of Christopher Portugal (Thes One) and Michael Turner (Double K). The group employed a DIY work ethic of sampling, MCing, DJing, and producing all of their output.

Despite difficulties achieving mainstream or chart successes, the group rejected the label of underground hip hop. They achieved prominence and acclaim, along with praise from fellow musicians.

== History ==
=== 1996–1999: Formation, The Next Step ===
While attending high school in Mid-City Los Angeles, group members Thes One and Double K were independently sampling music, creating beat tapes, and DJing local events. Thes One attended Loyola High, and Double K attended Hamilton High and was a part of the Log Cabin Crew, a hip hop collective that also included fellow Hamilton High students Murs, Eligh and Scarub (of Living Legends). They met while looking for sample material in a record store and were impressed by each other's work, forming a friendship.

The group decided to use the name "People Under the Stairs" because they felt it represented their music aesthetic; during a time when most other hip hop artists were forming large crews or collectives, they wanted to stay out of the spotlight and concentrate on the music, only coming out from "under the stairs" to perform before they went back again. The group's name does not originate from the 1991 Wes Craven film The People Under the Stairs, as they were not aware of it when conceiving the group.

In 1998, while Thes One was attending the University of Southern California, People Under the Stairs used Thes One's student loan funds to create, package and release their first 12-inch single, entitled The Next Step II. Nearly 500 copies were pressed, and the record sold well. They would go on to release their first album, The Next Step, in 1998. The album was recorded on an 8-track ADAT digital recorder, mostly at Thes One's home in Los Angeles, and was engineered entirely by Thes One and Double K. This album failed to make an impact in the Los Angeles hip hop scene, though the group found a larger fan base in Europe, embarking on a tour in August 1999. They signed to Om Records, a music label generally known at the time for electronic music and club music, for a four-album deal. The European leg of the tour, though it began as an Om Records tour, evolved into a solo act for People Under the Stairs.

=== 2000–2003: Question in the Form of an Answer, O.S.T, and ...Or Stay Tuned ===
Their sophomore album, Question in the Form of an Answer, was released in June 2000. Like The Next Step, the album was self-recorded and used an eclectic and diverse range of beats rooted in jazz and psychedelic rock, as well as filtering techniques learned from studying analog sound equipment. The album was supported by singles "Youth Explosion", "The Cat" and "We'll Be There". People Under the Stairs embarked on a second world tour to support the record, including performances at the 2000 Glastonbury Festival and Essential Music Festival, alongside Biz Markie, Ice-T, Gerry "Jeru" Mulligan, Masta Ace and De La Soul. During this tour, the group released their first compilation album, American Men Vol. 1, sold at concert venues, while Om Records also re-released The Next Step in 2001.

The group enjoyed a degree of success in the Los Angeles hip hop scene, including Thes One's participation in a beat battle against fellow Los Angeles recording artist will.i.am on April 25, 2002. Their third album, O.S.T., was released in June 2002. The album was again produced in Thes One's home by the duo and released on Om records. O.S.T. proved to be more complex than the group's first albums; the track "Montego Slay" used over 20 minuscule sections of music from Jamaican tourist souvenir records. The group also used live instrumentation for the first time on a release, enlisting Headnodic (of the Crown City Rockers and The Mighty Underdogs) to play electric bass. People Under the Stairs supported the release of O.S.T. by playing at the Reading and Leeds Festivals, as well as the US Cali-Comm hip hop tour with Del the Funky Homosapien, KutMasta Kurt, Planet Asia, and the Lifesavas.

The group's final album released under Om Records was 2003 ...Or Stay Tuned, though it was originally marketed and labeled as an EP release, due to contractual issues. The group would later reclassify the record a full-length release.

=== 2004–2006: Side projects and Stepfather ===
In 2004, the group concluded their contract with Om Records. Thes One began work on a number of side projects, including co-founding Tres Records with Chikara Kurahashi from Giant Panda, and two 12-inch singles on the label, Noonen (an ode to the 1980 comedy film Caddyshack) and Doin' It (with Raashan Ahmad of Crown City Rockers). In May 2004, he coordinated the Bloquera project, a trip to southernmost Baja California to record an EP with members of Giant Panda and shoot a video on Super 8; he also produced and mixed Fly School Reunion, the debut album of Giant Panda.

In 2005, People Under the Stairs signed a deal with a smaller, local Los Angeles label, Basement Records, for domestic release of their next album, with overseas distribution by Tres Records. Just before the release of the album, the group grew annoyed by internet music piracy and peer-to-peer file sharing. In a move that was equal parts a precautionary measure and a joke aimed at over-eager fans, People Under the Stairs decided to leak a fake version of the album onto the internet in the month preceding the album's release in 2006. When the real album was released in April, Stepfather debuted at #32 on the Billboard Heatseaker Chart and #35 on the Billboard Independent Albums chart, and the album was met with widespread positive reviews and received more coverage than the group's previous efforts. The group made an effort to expand beyond sample-based hip.hop, using a broader, less-jazzy sound palate and inviting George Clinton to perform on an album interlude.

They toured the US through spring 2006, taking along the rock-rap group Gym Class Heroes as their opening act. In the summer and fall of 2006, the group embarked on another world tour, visiting Australia, New Zealand, Japan and Europe. For the Europe leg of the tour, they were accompanied by Giant Panda.

=== 2007–2010: Fun DMC, The Om Years, and Carried Away ===
Following the release of Stepfather, Thes One released his debut solo album, Lifestyle Marketing, on Tres Records. The album was well received in the hip hop community. Double K also released a solo instrumental track, "Face to Face", on a split single with Los Angeles producer Olde Soul. In 2008, the group worked with director Matt Bird to film a video for "The Wiz", a song about their experiences touring in Australia, while on location in Bondi Beach. This was the group's first music video. Om Records released a retrospective album, The Om Years, including a bonus CD of B-sides and rarities.

People Under the Stairs finished recording in fall 2008 and released their new album, FUN DMC, in September. Like the previous album, FUN DMC was released under an independent record label, Gold Dust Media, receiving positive reviews and debuting at #6 on the Billboard Heatseekers chart. The name of the album is an homage to the group Run-DMC; the album itself is a concept album involving the daily life of someone living and enjoying themselves in the Los Angeles neighborhoods where they grew up. They brought recording equipment to a South Central house party and barbecue, and used the ambient noise from the party to supplement the "daytime" songs on the new album.

Following a nationwide tour of the US in support of the album, People Under the Stairs celebrated their 10-year anniversary with a sold-out show at the historic El Rey Theatre in Los Angeles. The performance was released on DVD the following year. The group would return to Om Records for their next record, Carried Away, which debuted at #5 on the iTunes hip hop charts and at #23 on the Billboard Heatseeker Charts.

=== 2011–2012: Highlighter, 12 Step Program and The Gettin' off Stage ===
Unsatisfied with their past record labels, Thes One made the decision after Carried Away to take complete control of the production process for the group's albums, releasing all new material under a new business entity, Piecelock 70. Thes One constructed a new recording facility in downtown Los Angeles. Piecelock 70 released all subsequent People Under the Stairs albums, as well as material by other artists, including Headnodic, DJ Day and Doc Delay. Thes One made the decision to run Piecelock 70 under a worker cooperative business model, allowing associate artists to retain complete control over their output while sharing resources and using the label's facilities.

On June 17, 2011, People Under the Stairs joined a large and eclectic group of musicians, including Girl Talk, Big Boi, Pretty Lights, Mac Miller, and Empire of the Sun, to kick off the inaugural Governor's Ball Music Festival in NYC. While on stage at the show, they announced their subsequent album, Highlighter, released on September 30, 2011. This was the first album on the new Piecelock 70 label, Like Stepfather, the album was one of the more experimental releases for the group, employing alternate time-signatures, live instrumentation, and a string section. The album was received positively.

In 2012, People Under the Stairs were invited by fellow Los Angeles hip hop musician (and highschool friend) Murs to play at a concert series in support of the Los Angeles County Museum of Art.

In January 2014, Thes One announced that People Under the Stairs' ninth full-length album would be titled 12 Step Program (also promoted as 12SP). In April, the group released the music video for the lead single "1 Up Til Sun Up". The album debuted at #56 on the iTunes charts, #7 on the iTunes rap charts, #11 on the Billboard Heatseeker charts, and #33 on the Billboard R&B/Rap Album charts. In 2015, the group revealed their tenth album would be a three-part EP comprising six songs each, titled The Gettin' Off Stage, which was released in November 2015.

=== 2019–2021: Sincerely, The P, disbandment, and death of Double K ===
In February 2019, People Under the Stairs released their final album Sincerely, The P. Thes One revealed on social media this would be their final album, marking 21 years in the music industry.

On January 30, 2021, Double K died, with the cause of death being alcohol poisoning. Artists such as Chuck D, Questlove, RJD2, Open Mike Eagle, and Immortal Technique paid tribute to Double K through social media.

== Musical style and influences ==
Before the inception of People Under the Stairs, the group's members attended many West Coast hip hop shows in Los Angeles. In numerous interviews, the group has cited many of these groups as influences, including Freestyle Fellowship, The Pharcyde, Jurassic 5, and The Beatnuts. The group paid direct homage to A Tribe Called Quest on the song "Check the Vibe" on 2009's Carried Away. Other cited influences include DJ Jazzy Jeff & The Fresh Prince, Public Enemy, and West Coast gangsta rap such as DJ Quik and Eazy-E.

For the most part, the group avoided sociopolitical or activist themes, gangster rap, battle rap, and material wealth. Instead, they focused on personal experiences and enjoyment, including life in (and pride for) Los Angeles, video gaming, barbecues and food, recreational drug use, and relaxing. A small portion of songs have dealt with more serious themes. People Under the Stairs drew on a wide array of record samples to create their work, including jazz, funk, rock, and spoken word. Thes One extensively studied the history of electronic instrumentation, eventually giving college lectures on the subject.

== Legacy ==
Despite being considered underground and never having achieved breakout mainstream success, they have been lauded by many other acclaimed artists, including Chuck D of Public Enemy, Biz Markie, and Trey Anastasio of the rock band Phish. The group was chosen, alongside other artists, to appear in and remix the main theme for The Simpsons 20th Anniversary Special – In 3-D! On Ice!. The group also had music featured in Run's House, Entourage, and the feature film Street Dreams.

== Discography ==
- The Next Step (1998)
- Question in the Form of an Answer (2000)
- American Men Vol. 1 (compilation) (2000)
- O.S.T. (2002)
- ...Or Stay Tuned (2003)
- Stepfather (2006)
- The Om Years (compilation) (2008)
- Fun DMC (2008)
- Carried Away (2009)
- Highlighter (2011)
- 12 Step Program (2014)
- American Men Vol. 2 (compilation) (2015)
- The Gettin' Off Stage, Step 1 (2015)
- The Gettin' Off Stage, Step 2 (2016)
- Sincerely, The P (2019)
