= Double K (American musician) =

American musician (1977–2021)

- Also known as: DJ Kaos; L.A. Mike; Hale Bop; Big Mike; Mike Burner; K Jackson; Kidd Drunkadelic; Dub K; Boogie
- Born: Michael Turner; August 1, 1977; Los Angeles, California, U.S.
- Died: January 30, 2021 (aged 43) Los Angeles, California, U.S.
- Genre: Hip hop
- Occupations: Rapper; record producer; DJ
- Instruments: Turntables; sampler; vocals
- Years active: 1997–2021
- Formerly of: People Under the Stairs
- Website: PUTS.Band – Official PUTS Artist Page

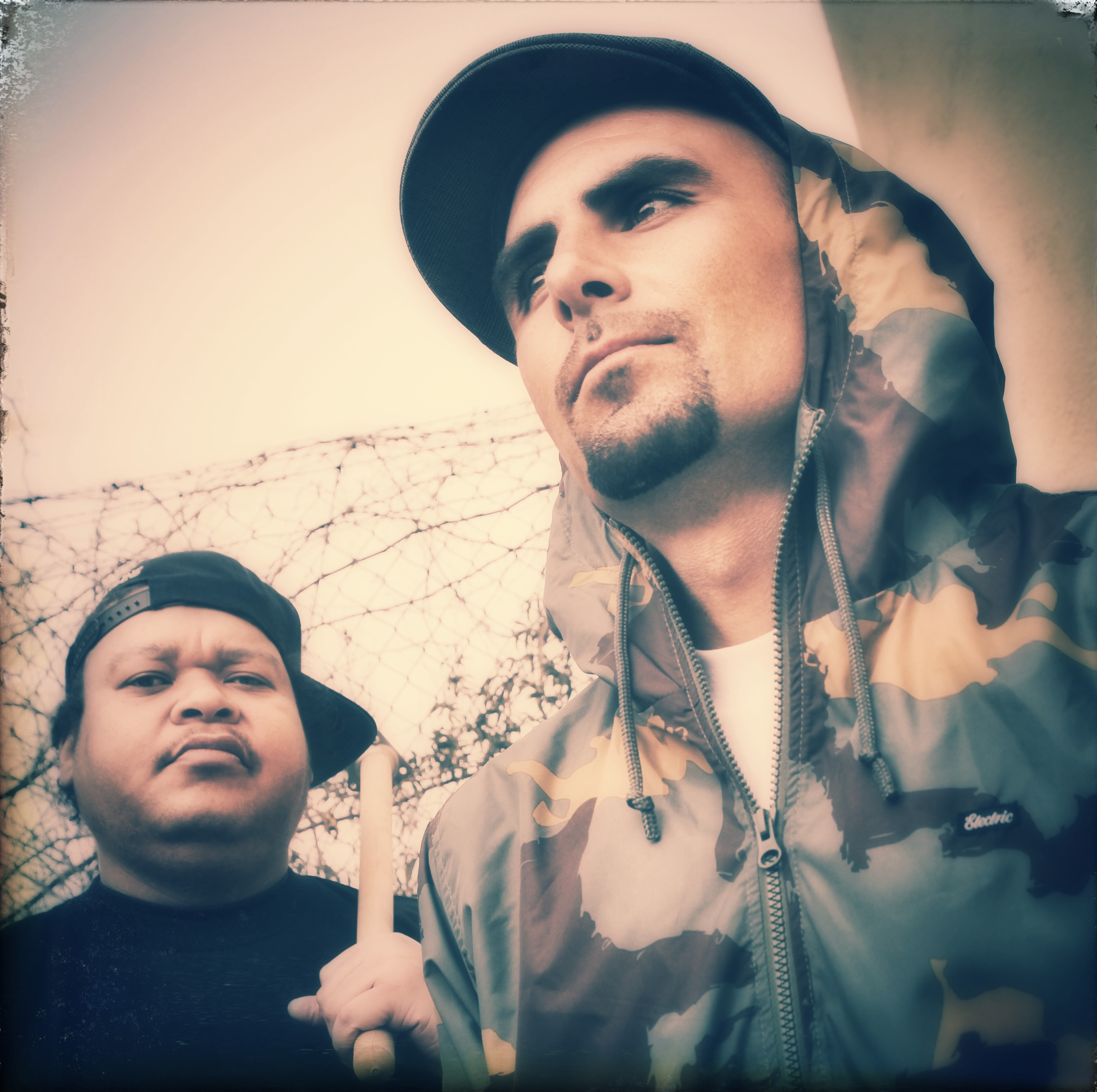

Michael Turner (August 1, 1977 – January 30, 2021), best known as Double K, was an American rapper, producer and DJ. As one half of the hip hop duo People Under the Stairs, he appeared on 12 studio albums in addition to a number of singles, extended plays and compilations. He also released one instrumental solo album, Clinophobia (While You Were Sleeping) (2017), under his moniker L.A. Mike.

== Early life ==
Michael Turner was born in Hollywood and raised in West Los Angeles on Crescent Heights Blvd. His father, Michael Turner Sr. was a drummer and musician. Turner was introduced to an eclectic mix of records at an early age by both his father and mother. He attended Saturn Street Elementary School, where he won the 1985 talent show by performing a Fat Boys cover.

Turner attended Alexander Hamilton High School alongside Murs, Scarub, and Eligh, who he would collaborate with during their early musical career as Log Cabin. Turner first started out as a DJ getting introduced to the techniques, components, and different styles of DJing from DJ Sweat. As well as featuring on records, he performed at high school functions and house parties under the alias DJ Kaos before pursuing a rap career and taking on the name Double K from the character Kenny "Double K" Kirkland from the film Beat Street.

== Career ==
Turner was a producer and DJ for People Under the Stairs, Villain Park, Kidd Lexus, and Blvme. He was the older brother of Villain Park group member Smoke, rapper Pookie Blow and first cousin of Los Angeles producer, Computer Jay. He produced the first solo song by Murs called "Red Dots" in 1996. His musical aliases include DJ Kaos, L.A. Mike, Hale Bop, K Jackson, Kidd Drunkadelic, Dub K and Boogie.

Double K was a lifelong Parliament-Funkadelic fan and an official member of George Clinton's Funk Mob.

== Death ==
On January 30, 2021, Turner died at his home in Los Angeles, California. On the second anniversary of Turner's death, rapper/producer and longtime collaborator Thes One of People Under the Stairs released the instrumental album Farewell, my friend, as an homage to the late rapper.

== Discography ==
=== People Under the Stairs albums ===
- The Next Step (1998)
- Question in the Form of an Answer (2000)
- American Men Vol. 1 (compilation) (2000)
- O.S.T. (2002)
- ...Or Stay Tuned (2003)
- Stepfather (2006)
- The Om Years (compilation) (2008)
- Fun DMC (2008)
- Carried Away (2009)
- Highlighter (2011)
- 12 Step Program (2014)
- American Men Vol. 2 (compilation) (2015)
- The Gettin' Off Stage, Step 1 (extended play) (2015)
- The Gettin' Off Stage, Step 2 (extended play) (2016)
- Sincerely, the P (2019)

=== Solo albums ===
- Clinophobia (While You Were Sleeping) (as "L.A. Mike", 2017)

=== Mixtape compilations ===
- I Ain't Gettin' Better (as "DJ Double K", 2000)
- Uhh, I Hope Y'all Got Your Sunglasses On Out There... (as "LA Mike", 2002)
- Doin' What We Do, The Way We Do When We Do What We Do... (with A.C. the PD, 2005)
- The Family Circus Mixtape (The Aesthetics Crew, 2012)

=== Solo tracks ===
- "Livin' a Mean One" (On Top of the World, 2002)
- "Livin' a Mean One (The New Gangsta Gangsta)" (Ssence, 2003)
- "Skit" (Ssence, 2003)
- "The Mike Turner Story" (Ssence, 2003)
- "Smoking a Blunt" (Natural Fun, 2004)
- "Face to Face" (Taking Me Places 7", 2008)
- "Bonus Beat" (Taking Me Places 7", 2008)

=== Posthumous releases ===
- The Double O (with Dooley O, 2022)
