= Giant Panda (group) =

American underground hip hop group

- Origin: Los Angeles, California
- Genre: Underground hip hop
- Years active: 2002–2008
- Label: Tres Records
- Past members: Newman; Maanumental; Chikaramanga

Giant Panda was an underground hip hop group from Los Angeles, California. Giant Panda is composed of childhood friends Alex Newman, Jamaan "Maanumental" McLaren (from Seattle), and Chikara "Chikaramanga" Kurahashi (from Tokyo).

== Career ==
The trio's name refers to their ethnic and cultural make-up. Their first single was "88 Remix", released independently in December 2002. Their follow-up single was the 12-inch vinyl record "With It" in September 2004 on Tres Records. 2005 saw the release of Giant Panda's first full-length album, Fly School Reunion (Tres Records). Fly School Reunion received positive reviews in magazines such as URB (4 1/2 stars) and Exclaim!.

Giant Panda made URB's list of Next 100 in 2005. This allowed the group to tour the West Coast with fellow Angelino hip-hoppers People Under The Stairs and Time Machine. In 2006, Giant Panda hit the road with Ugly Duckling for a European tour. They reached the EU shores again in 2006, touring with People Under The Stairs. 20 May 2008 saw the release of Giant Panda's second effort, Electric Laser. XLR8R called Electric Laser "futuristic funk" that stays true to the group's "boom bap" and "electro" modes but also moves the sound forward.

The group cites De La Soul, Jungle Brothers, EPMD and A Tribe Called Quest as their key influences.

== Discography ==
=== Promos ===
- Fresh Donuts (2002)

=== Albums ===
- Fly School Reunion (2005)
- Electric Laser (2008)

=== 7" singles ===
- Just Cause (2001)

=== 12" singles ===
- '88 Remix (2002)
- With It (2005)
- Super Fly (2005)
- T.K.O. (2005)
- Speakers Pop (2008)

=== Collaborations ===
- Bloquera (2004) (Newman, Maanumental, Sir Kado, and Superbrush 427)
