= Om Records =

American record label

- Founded: 1995; 31 years ago
- Founder: Christopher Smith; Steve Gray
- Genre: Breakbeat; chillout; deep house; downtempo; hip-hop; nu-disco; tech house
- Country of origin: United States
- Location: San Francisco, Califonria
- Official website: www.om-records.com

Om Records is an American record label established in 1995 that releases electronic, dance and hip-hop music. The label was founded in San Francisco in 1995 by Christopher Smith and Steve Gray. Om Records releases both artist albums and compilations, including the Om Lounge and Mushroom Jazz series. Om's roster of artists includes Groove Armada, Underworld, Dirty Vegas, Bassnectar, Indiana Taurus, J Boogie, People Under the Stairs, Samantha James, Amp Live, Greenskeepers, Hot Toddy, and Wagon Cookin. Past artists have included Kaskade, Wolfgang Gartner, Ladybug Mecca, and Juan Atkins.

Om Records also hosts nightclub events in Seattle, Los Angeles, Ibiza, Miami, Chicago, Barcelona, and London. The label is based in the Mission District of San Francisco.

== Releases ==
The first releases on Om were a couple of Compilation albums titled "Groove Active" and "Spiritual High".

=== Child's Play ===
Child's Play was started in late 2009 with the first release from Amp Live featuring Trackademicks called "Gary is A Robot". The label would go on to feature full album and single releases from the likes of Amp Live, Greenskeepers, Bassnectar, and James Curd. Treasure Fingers, Flosstradamus, Juan MacLean, Tommie Sunshine, Bassnectar, RJD2, Mexicans With Guns, Grand Theft, Blu Jemz, Robot Koch, DJ Vadim, and more have contributed to the label with remixes.

=== Om Hip-hop ===
The Om Hip Hop imprint was started in 2006 and has seen many hit indie releases including artist albums from Strange Fruit Project, Zion I & The Grouch, People Under The Stairs, J-Boogie's Dubtronic Science, Black Spade, Zeph & Azeem, Colossus, and Thes One. The label has also released a number of 12" vinyl singles from Digable Planets, Ladybug Mecca featuring Kenny Dope and Raheem DeVaughn, Zion I & The Grouch, J-Boogie's Dubtronic Science Feat. Lyrics Born, Strange Fruit Project Feat. Erykah Badu, Zeph & Azeem featuring hip-hop legends Marley Marl and Carl G. and E Da Boss featuring Gift of Gab and Lateef The Truth Speaker.

=== Smoke N' Mirrors ===
Started in early 2010 as a nu-disco house label, Smoke N' Mirrors has featured singles release from Hot Toddy, Wagon Cookin, Mike Monday, Shiny Objects, and Lance DeSardi. In September 2010, Smoke N' Mirrors released the first full length artist album from Crazy P member Hot Toddy.

=== Deep Concentration ===
The original hip-hop imprint created by Om in 1997 featured a series of compilations and 12" singles. Artist featured on the compilations have included Cut Chemist, DJ Swingsett, Prince Paul, Peanut Butter Wolf, X-Men, Mix Master Mike, DJ Spooky, Beat Junkies, Planet Asia, Mass Influence, Crown City Rockers, Jeremy Sole, DJ John Carmichael and more.

=== Colorforms ===
Colorforms is a 12" vinyl singles label started by Om for breaks, turntablism, and dubstep. The label featured 12"s released from Bassnectar, Ming, FS, Soulstice, and more. The art for the jackets was designed by urban street artist David P. Flores.

== List of artists ==
- Amp Live
- Andy Caldwell
- Bassnectar
- Black Spade
- Blaze
- Charles Webster
- Raashan Ahmad
- Derrick Carter
- Dirty Vegas
- DJ Colette
- DJ Garth
- DJ Sneak
- Eighty Mile Beach
- DJ Heather
- Fish Go Deep
- Greenskeepers
- Groove Armada
- Hot Toddy
- Jake Childs
- Jamie Anderson
- J-Boogie's Dubtronic Science
- King Kooba
- Ladybug Mecca
- Lovebirds
- Mark Farina
- Matt Edwards
- Miguel Migs
- Ming (DJ)
- Ming (DJ) & FS
- Onionz
- People Under The Stairs
- Samantha James
- Soulstice
- Strange Fruit Project
- Style of Eye
- Thes One
- Underworld
- Wolfgang Gartner
- Afro Mystik
- Atjazz
- DJ Fluid
- Florian Kruse
- Gabriel Rene
- Hipp-e
- Home & Garden (Tim K and Timothy Shumaker)
- Indiana Taurus
- JT Donaldson
- Lance DeSardi
- LandShark
- Marques Wyatt
- Mike Monday
- Pezzner
- Rithma
- Wagon Cookin

== See also ==
- List of record labels
