= Thes One =

American rapper (born 1977)

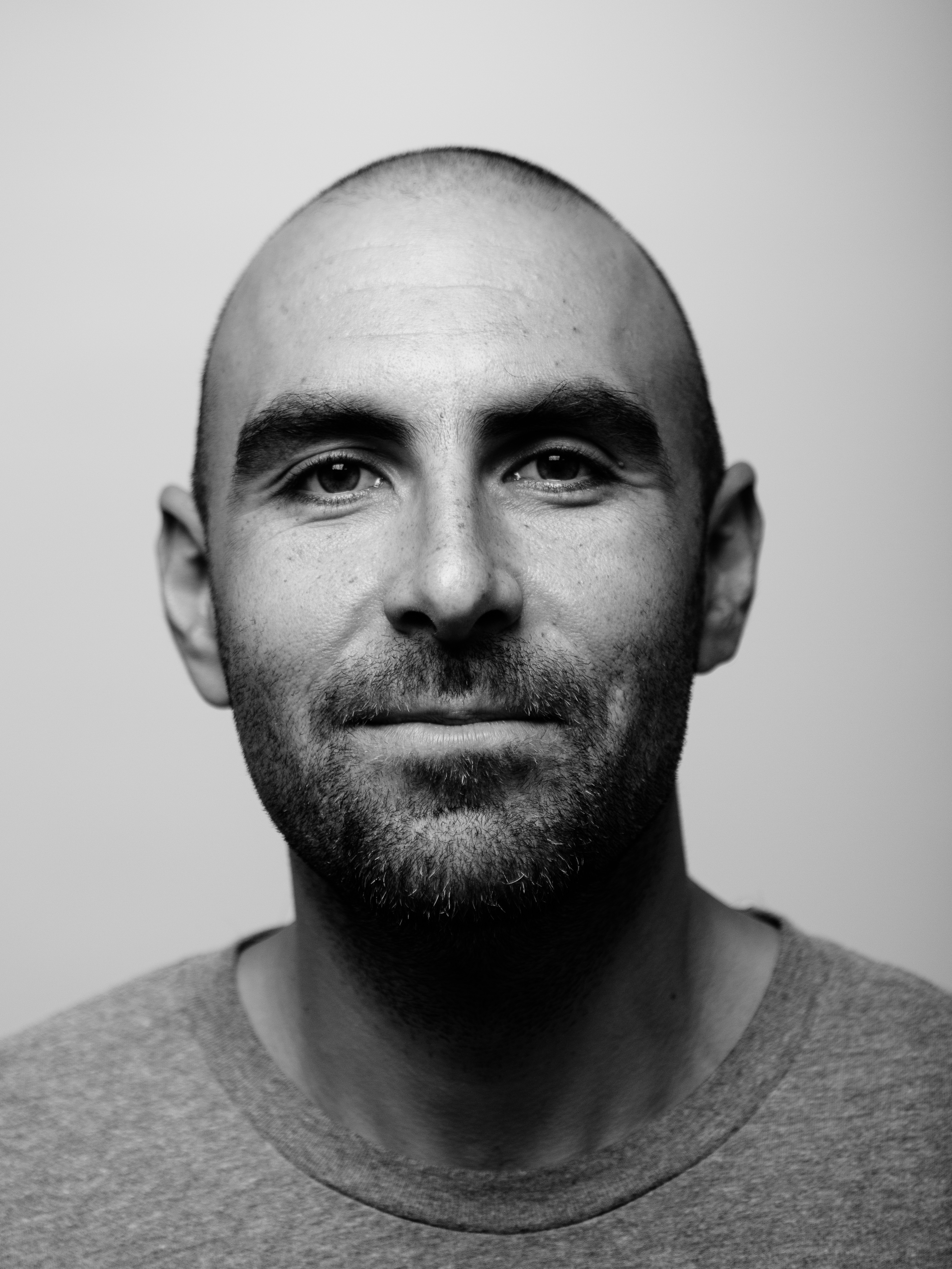

Background information
- Also known as: Lord Radio
- Born: Christopher Cesar Portugal; October 18, 1977 (age 48); Torrance, California, U.S.
- Origin: San Pedro, Los Angeles, California, U.S.
- Genre: Hip hop
- Occupations: Rapper; record producer
- Instruments: Turntables; sampler; vocals; keyboards
- Years active: 1997—present
- Label: Piecelock 70
- Formerly of: People Under the Stairs
- Website: PUTS.Band - Official PUTS Artist Page

Christopher Cesar Portugal (born October 18, 1977), best known as Thes One, is an American rapper, record producer and sound engineer. As one half of hip hop duo People Under the Stairs alongside Double K, serving as a vocalist/MC, producer and business manager, he produced and engineered 12 albums for People Under the Stairs that appeared on the U.S. and International Billboard charts numerous times, as well as remixes and singles for various artists across the globe and appearances as guest vocalist. As a business manager, he coordinated world tours for People Under the Stairs, co-founded the independent artist-run Tres Records label and went on to create Piecelock 70, a self run, independent record label and brand in 2004. People Under the Stairs announced their intention to retire in early 2019 following the release of their 12th and final album Sincerely, The P, and his career and contribution was celebrated by the Los Angeles Times in a full page article.

Additionally, he designs and builds recording studios and custom gear, guest lectures at colleges and graduate programs about AI, financial literacy and music history and continues to create music following the death of his partner. His musical aliases include Lord Radio.

== Early life ==
Born Christopher Cesar Portugal in Torrance, California to an American mother and immigrant Peruvian father, Thes One grew up in San Pedro, California. He was first introduced to hip hop at Peck Park childcare, where older counselors would paint graffiti in the empty public pool and play the now defunct AM radio station 1580 KDAY. While attending high school in Los Angeles, Thes One met Michael Turner (Double K), and the two began working together as what would soon become People Under The Stairs.

Upon graduating from Loyola High School in 1995, he applied to Berklee School of Music in Boston for a BA in Audio Engineering but received a writing scholarship to USC, where he was chosen for the prestigious honors English program. While there, he studied under his advisor Percival Everett, received the Seibert Fellowship for poetry, acceptance to the Golden Key Honors Society and walked in 1998 Magna Cum Laude with Dean's Honors.

While studying at USC, he began recording music with Michael Turner as People Under the Stairs, and in 1997 they performed their first in-store appearance as a group at the now defunct Beat Non Stop record store on Melrose. That year they also took a trip to the Bay Area, and upon returning, wrote and recorded "San Francisco Knights", one of the group's most popular songs.

== Om years, first four albums ==
In the spring of 1998, months before graduating and using his student loan funding, Thes One independently released the first People Under the Stairs 12-inch entitled The Next Step Pt. 2. 250 of the original vinyl run were made until the stamper broke, at which time an additional 200 were made from a different master without the secret bonus track "Live at the Fishbucket", which appears on the first run B-side. In late summer 1998, he independently released their first album entitled The Next Step, which he also produced and engineered in its entirety.

After selling out of the vinyl 12-inch in 7 minutes, the shopkeeper at Mr. Bongo's record store in London called Chris Smith, label owner of Om Records, and urged him to get in contact with the group. Chris Smith contacted Thes One initially for one song for their compilation series Deep Concentration and Mushroom Jazz, but upon hearing the tracks they were working on, offered P.U.T.S. a four-album deal.

The deal was signed in 1999 and P.U.T.S. left for their first world tour in August 1999, initially as support for the Deep Concentration project but later that year in Europe as a Solo Act with local openers.

The second PUTS album, Question In The Form Of An Answer, was released in June 2000. The lead 12-inch single, "Youth Explosion", sold the full run of 15,000 copies pressed in its first month, and was not repressed in order to promote the second and third singles "The Cat" and "We’ll Be There" – each of which went on to sell its 15,000 run. The album was critically acclaimed for its eclectic and diverse range of beats rooted in jazz and Psychedelic rock and P.U.T.S. continued with another set of world tours to support the record, this time adding Japan and Australia to their routing.

Following the release of the second album, Thes One began to coordinate strings of successful world tours for PUTS culminating in performances at the UK's Glastonbury Festival in 2001 alongside Kelis and shows at the Reading, Leeds and the Essentials festival in London where the group was joined by Biz Markie, Ice-T, Jeru, Masta Ace and De La Soul on the final Sunday of the festival.

In between managing tours and performing, Thes One began producing and engineering the third People Under the Stairs album, which was released in June 2002 as O.S.T. (Original Soundtrack). Critically acclaimed for its broad musical influences and dead on hip hop sound, songs such as "Montego Slay" and Acid Raindrops quickly became favorites and helped solidify their dedicated worldwide fan base. As well as producing People Under the Stairs albums, Thes One completed remixes for many artists as well as library music for a few television pilots which were not picked up. 2002 also saw PUTS embark on their first national US tour as support for Deltron 3030.

The group continued to tour through the 2004 release of their Or Stay Tuned album, the final release on San Francisco-based Om Records. The album was labeled an EP due to contractual issues but was considered by many, including the group, to be a full-length contribution. The group continued to tour the globe, spending, at times, 7 to 8 months of the year on the road.

== Tres Records ==
In April 2004, Thes One was approached by friend Chikara Kurahashi (of Giant Panda) and was asked to co-found and help start a record label using his connections and knowledge of the record industry. He agreed, and to help get the label off of the ground, turned over a series of 12" projects and one album, Lifestyle Marketing, as well as the concept for the Bloquera project. The first twelve-inch release on the newly formed Tres Records imprint was Thes One's Noonen 12", an ode to the music of the movie Caddyshack, followed by Doin’ It with Raashan Amad. Thes One also brought artists Lightheaded (whom he signed when they opened for PUTS in Portland) and DJ Alibi to the Tres Roster. In May 2004, he coordinated the Bloquera project, a trip to southernmost Baja California to record an EP and shoot a video on Super 8. Following this trip he began executive producing and mixing the Fly School Reunion album for Tres Artists Giant Panda. Shortly thereafter, following a disagreement about the structure and compensation for artists, Thes One formally left Tres Records both as an artist and founder.

== Stepfather LP ==
Thes One continued to tour with PUTS through 2005 and began production on the next PUTS album, Stepfather. He signed a distribution deal for the group with Los Angeles label Basement Records and coordinated the elaborate deluxe packaging with long-time friend Joshua Dunn of design team Secret Pizza Party. Stepfather (2006), PUTS fifth full-length release, was met with critical acclaim and presented a more modern and personal direction for the group. Consisting of Thes One's turn towards left of center rhythm's and modern soul and disco, it was his most ambitious production yet, though songs like Tuxedo Rap seemed, at first listen, a simple return to hip-hop's disco rap roots. The group toured the album in the US throughout that year, taking then unknown rock-rap group Gym Class Heroes as opening act with them.

Stepfather debuted on the Billboard charts May 6, 2006 at #32 on the Heatseaker Chart and #35 on the Independent Albums chart.

Throughout 2006 and 2007, Thes One continued to tour as a member of People Under the Stairs and tour/business manager, expanding the groups presence throughout the world through festival dates in Japan, Australia, Europe and the US.

== Lifestyle Marketing LP ==
In March 2007, Thes One released his debut solo instrumental album Lifestyle Marketing. A 2-disc concept album of instrumentals made from Herb Pilhofer's Music That Works series; a demonstration album originally released in the early 1970s in limited numbers that showcased Pilhofer's musical compositions for radio & TV commercials, industrial films, and other projects. The first disc is Thes One's album; the second consists of some of the original tracks from Music That Works from which Thes One's album was made. The first single off the album is the 10" release 'Target' b/w 'Grain Belt Beer'.

== Street Dreams film ==
In 2007, Thes One also spent the year writing, performing and recording the original 5.1 score for Street Dreams, a dramatic feature film starring Rob Dyrdek and Paul Rodriguez Jr, slated for release in 2009. His first full-length feature score, he enlisted the help of long-time friend and musical collaborator Kat 010. In an interview by Berkela Motion Pictures/UX Entertainment, Thes One explained the process of using hip hop to score: "Thes One speaks on scoring Street Dreams with Rob D" Street Dreams was released in Theatres June 12, 2009. It received the "Audience Favorite" award at the 2009 Newport Beach Film Festival and Thes One spoke at the screening alongside director Chris Zamoscianyk and the cast of the movie.

== Fun DMC LP ==
In 2008, Thes One secured a distribution deal for People Under The Stairs with upstart label Gold Dust Media, a subdivision of K7 records worldwide. Following this, Thes One organized, planned and self funded the video for "The Wiz", a song to be released on Fun DMC and shot entirely on location in Sydney Australia with director Matt Bird. Featuring innovative underwater filming and a massive helicopter shot, the video received critical and fan praise alike and helped pave the way for the successful release of Fun DMC, PUTS’ 6th full-length release. After years of producing and engineering the complicated Fun DMC album for People Under the Stairs partly in studio and partly on location in South Central Los Angeles in friend Blewfoot's backyard, the album received worldwide acclaim and noted a marked turn in the groups sound back towards the modern funk of early 1980s Los Angeles. Following a nationwide tour in support of the album, People Under The Stairs celebrated their 10-year anniversary in December 2008 with a sold-out show at Los Angeles’ historical El Rey theatre.

On October 18, 2009, the Fun DMC debut on the Billboard charts as #6 on the Heatseekers List

In February 2009, Thes One booked, managed and performed as a member of PUTS in their first tour of China, selling out shows in both Beijing and Shanghai. PUTS, amongst other shows, was confirmed to play the Coachella Music Festival and Bonnaroo Music Festival in 2009. Immediately following their performance at Bonnaroo, Spin Magazine nominated People Under the Stairs "The best...period."

== Carried Away LP ==
On October 13, 2009, People Under the Stairs released their 7th album, Carried Away. It marked a brief return to Om Records, the home of their first 4 albums and a simple theme. As explained by The Onion in their AV club review, "Carried Away proves that Thes One and Double K will be pumping out sunny, laid-back party anthems long after the Internet memes grow stale". The album, which debuted at #5 on the iTunes hip hop charts was featured by iTunes, who noted: "As usual with PUTS, Carried Away is a self-contained effort with no guest producers or MC cameos, just entertaining rhymes and straightforward beatwork dotted with well-placed samples meant to delight hip-hop purists everywhere." Carried Away debuted on the Billboard charts at #23 on the Heatseeker Charts. Fans who had followed the group for years noted in many submitted reviews that the album was a return to classic PUTS material. Though demand to tour the US following the release of Carried Away was strong, PUTS were determined to break new parts of the world and proceeded to tour Brazil and then the southern cape of Africa following the release of the album.

== Highlighter LP ==
Highlighter was released in late 2011 as limited CD and Double vinyl custom package. It was the first release of the newly revamped Piecelock 70 organization, which later would release a larger body of work, including releases by fellow producers Headnodic (of Crown City Rockers and The Mighty Underdogs), DJ Day and Doc Delay, and author Alan Simpson's debut novel, The Mop.

== Piecelock 70 Label ==
For People Under the Stairs, Thes One later established the independent imprint Piecelock 70. The label is owned and operated by Thes One and has released recordings by People Under the Stairs, Thes One’s solo projects, and affiliated collaborators.

Piecelock 70 has served as the primary outlet for Thes One’s post-People Under the Stairs releases, including limited vinyl editions and collaborative projects tied to underground hip hop and record-collector culture.

Alongside his group work, Thes One released solo instrumental recordings beginning in the 2000s, emphasizing vinyl sampling, analog production, and thematic beat construction.

His later solo albums include Where the Piecelock Ends (2014), the collaborative project Náufrago with DJ Day (2017), and Farewell, My Friend (2023).

Following the death of People Under the Stairs member Double K, Farewell, My Friend was described in a Los Angeles Times profile as a tribute release marking a new phase of Thes One’s solo work.

== Sampling ==
Thes One began producing hip-hop beats with a modified cassette deck and a Gemini phrase sampler in a pdm-6008 in 1989. He credits the Gemini sampler for defining his loop based production style and still uses the pdm-6008 in his studio to monitor vinyl. Self-taught as an audio engineer, He would meticulously read magazines such as Home Studio Recording and the Handbook for Audio Engineering. In 1992 he began looping music on a Tascam 4-track, and after working numerous jobs, he saved up money to buy a brand new Akai MPC-3000 in 1994. Aside from an E-mu SP-1200 and a Roland VP-9000, He still uses the MPC-3000 as the primary production tool, and has worked with Bruce Forat to modify the analogue side of the machine. Oftentimes defined by the jazzy sound of his earlier work, Thes One's sound and influences can largely be attributed to his massive vinyl collection. Specializing in local Los Angeles pressings of rare funk, soul and rock, he has spent the latter half of his life searching for the lost and forgotten music of his hometown. With a collection of over 10,000 pieces, he has been quoted as saying that he is not defined by his collection, but the influence in his music is undeniable.

Often thickly layered with samples, one defining feature of Thes One's work is that it never sounds choppy, but rather like a reconstructed piece of music. A fan of filtering pieces of music, his work is often underlined by layers of resonant loops with sharp filter q's. His earlier work was often critically classified as derived from the golden era of New York City production, with jazzy loops and horn samples coming together to create the sonic landscape, but his later work showed more of an individual progression and closer ties to the modern soul/funk sound of Los Angeles. He has stated in interviews that he prides himself in the fact that he has tried to use different drum sounds for every beat he has made, whether released or unreleased.

== Equipment ==
Starting off with cassette decks and pro-sumer equipment, his studio evolved over the years. At the point that it is featured in the book Behind The Beat, the photo shows an Adat-XT and an Allen & Heath GS3000 alongside his MPC-3000. This appears to be taken shortly after OST was completed. In 2004, shortly before his first feature in Remix Magazine, he acquired a Neve 5316 (Baby-V). In 2008 he commissioned Steve Firlotte of Inward Connections to build a custom console based on the API 500 series format. Thes One's original idea was to have a stripped down 500 series line input mixer, the console soon blossomed to an 86 slot 24x4x4 mixer. With Steve's design, Ian Gardeners physical design and Thes One advising and testing, the console later became the commercially available Tree Audio 500, though Thes One still owns and uses the prototype/001 serial number unit.

== Television ==
Thes One's beats can be heard on various shows including Run's House, Rob and Big, Entourage, Girlfriends, a commercial for a Supermarket in Japan and various others.

== Trivia ==
- Thes One competed on The Price Is Right under his birth name. He was chosen for Contestants' Row and won on his first bid, playing the Shell Game. He won, among other things, a record player. Video of the appearance is included on the bonus DVD included with Stepfather as an Easter egg. Footage of which exists on YouTube: "Thes One on Price Is Right"
- Thes One has gone on record buying missions to India, Egypt, Peru, Mexico City, Brazil throughout the US and various other countries to augment his collection.
- He Battled will.i.am at the Rootdown Soundclash beat battle on April 25, 2002. A rare CD of the performance plus bonus materials was released in Japan only.

== Discography ==
=== Studio albums ===
- Thes One Presents Sound Clash at the Root Down (P-Vine Japan, 2004)
- Mithai, Wedding Gift CD (2004)
- Lifestyle Marketing (2007)
- Merry Christmas (The Lost Beats) (2009)
- Where the Piecelock Ends (2014)
- Naufrago (with DJ Day) (2017)
- 10 Years of Thes One (2017)
- Shelter in Place (2022)
- Farewell, My Friend (2023)

=== Score ===
- Street Dreams (Berkela Films, 2009)

=== Singles ===
- "Back on the Block Remix, Pete Rock & CL Smooth" (Boot Leg Recordings, 2001)
- "Noonen" (Tres Records, 2004)
- "The Next Stets: Stetsasonic" (Kajmere Sound Distribution, 2004)
- "Doin' It" (feat. Raashan Ahmad of Crown City Rockers) (Tres Records, 2005)
- "Target" (Tres Records, 2007)

=== Select Piecelock 70 releases ===
==== 2004–2010: Early Thes One and archival material ====
===== Albums and multimedia =====
- Thes One – Mithai (CD, promo, limited) (PL6010, 2004)
- People Under the Stairs – 10 Year Anniversary Set DVD (DVD, compilation, limited 2010)

===== Digital / independent releases =====
- Thes One – Xmas Beat Tape (CD, limited, 2009)
- Thes One – Funner Than Leather (digital album, 2008)

==== 2011–2014: Establishment of Piecelock 70 ====
===== People Under the Stairs =====
- Highlighter
  - CD album (PL7002, 2011)
  - 2×LP limited yellow marbled (PL7002LP, 2011)
- 12 Step Program
  - 2xLP orange and blue vinyl (PL7014, 2014)
  - Cassette limited transparent blue (PL7014C, 2014)

===== Thes One =====
- Thes One – 10 Years of Thes One wooden box set, mixed media (PL7001, 2013)

===== Associated artists =====
- DJ Day – Land of 1000 Chances
  - LP RSD limited (PL7006, 2013)
  - CD (PL7006CD, 2013)
  - LP limited (PL7006LP, 2013)
- Headnodic – The Iguana (PL7007, 2013)
- DJ Day – The Day Before (Deluxe) (PL7008LP, 2013)
- Doc Delay – Morgan (PL7009, 2013)

===== Singles / EPs =====
- Gitar – Hang With Fang (PL7010, 2013)
- Gitar – Active Cultures (PL7011, 2014)
- Headnodic – Junk Drawer Vol. 1 (PL7012, 2013)
- Gitar – New Martyrs Dub / Spiritual Dub (PL7013, 2013)

==== 2015–2018: Late-period PUTS and collaborative era ====
===== People Under the Stairs =====
- Big Sky Shakedown — (PL7015, 2014)
- The Gettin’ Off Stage, Step 1 (PL7020, 2015)
- The Gettin’ Off Stage cassette EP (PL7021C, 2016)
- Instrumentals: Gettin’ Off Stage Steps 1 & 2 (cassette) 2016
- Triple Digits EP – People Under the Stairs (12-inch) — 2016
- The Legend of the 40 Dogz — digital album — 2017

===== Thes One collaborations =====
- Thes One & DJ Day – Náufrago
  - LP / album — (PL7021, 2017)

===== Other artists =====
- LA Mike aka Double K – Clinophobia (PL7022, 2018)

===== Singles =====
- Thes One – Dogwhistles flexi-disc (PL7023, 2018)

==== 2019–2020: Final PUTS era and archival reissues ====
===== People Under the Stairs – Sincerely, The P =====
- Digital FLAC album (PL7024, 2019)
- CD (PL7024CD, 2019)
- LP colored variants (PL7024LP, 2019)
- Cassette (PL7024T, 2019)

===== Reissues =====
- O.S.T. 2×LP remaster (PL7025LP, 2020)

==== 2023–2025: Post-PUTS Thes One solo period ====
===== Albums =====
- Thes One – Farewell, My Friend
  - LP album (PL7026, 2023)
  - LP test pressing (PL7026 A/B, 2023)
- Thes One – Farewell My Friend: Footnotes
  - LP limited color variant (PL7029, 2023)
- Thes One – Where the Piecelock Ends
  - LP limited reissue (PL7031, 2025)

===== Various artists / Chemistry Collective =====
- Various – Project 1992 (PL7033C, 2025)
- Various – Chemistry Collective 2025 // Project 1992 (PL7033D — 2025)
- Kid Abstrakt, Blame One & Thes One – Mentally in Chemistry Thugged Out (PL7027, 2023)
- Thes One – Summer Games (PL7030, 2024)
- Thes One – Project 1992 (PL7033, 2025)
