= Crown City Rockers =

American hip-hop group

- Also known as: Mission
- Origin: Boston, Massachusetts, Oakland, California, U.S.
- Genre: Hip-hop
- Years active: 1997–present
- Labels: Basement Records; Insiduous Urban Records
- Members: Raashan Ahmad; Woodstock; Headnodic; Max MacVeety; Kat Ouano
- Website: crowncityrockers.com

Crown City Rockers is a five-member hip-hop group from Oakland, California, by way of Boston and Pasadena, California. They were formerly known as Mission, the name under which they released their 2001 debut album, One. In 2004, the group released their second album, Earthtones, followed by The Day After Forever in 2009.

The group plays old-school hip-hop music with live instrumentation (similar to other hip-hop groups including Gym Class Heroes, The Roots, N.E.R.D, and Stetsasonic). They have been compared to A Tribe Called Quest, The Roots, De La Soul, and other groups.

== Members ==
- Raashan Ahmad – MC
- Woodstock – samples, percussion
- Headnodic – bass guitar, production
- Max MacVeety – drums
- Kat Ouano – keyboards

== Discography ==
=== Studio albums ===
- One (2001) (as Mission)
- Earthtones (2004)
- The Day After Forever (2009)

=== Compilation albums ===
- Unreleased Joints, Demos & B-Sides (2014)

=== EPs ===
- Mission (1999) (as Mission)
- Weekend Soul (2004)
- Kiss (2009)

=== Singles ===
- "Contagious" (2000) (as Mission)
- "Soul Chips" b/w "Strange Days" (2001) (as Mission)
- "Home" (2001) (as Mission)
- "Mission: 2" (2002) (as Mission)
- "Another Day (Rhyme Writing)" (2004)
- "B-Boy" b/w "Summersault" (2007)
- "Body Rock" b/w "Restless" (2008)
