= Sebastian Arocha Morton production discography =

The following list is a discography of production by American record producer and film composer Sebastian Arocha Morton.

== Written and produced songs ==
Name of song, featured performers, originating album or film, year released and specified role.
Year	Title	Artist	Album or film	Songwriter	Production credits
1998	"Gimme Tha Power" "Voto Latino"	Molotov	Molomix		Producer, Remixer, Keyboards, Programming
1999	"Hanginaround"	Counting Crows	Hanginaround (Single)		Producer, Engineer, Keyboards
1999	"Revés"	Café Tacuba	Revés/Yo Soy		Producer, Remixer, Engineer
1999	"Scent of Magnolia"	David Sylvian	Dead Bees on a Cake		Producer, Engineer, Keyboards
1999	"Paraíso" "Wish" "Paraíso" (Remix House) "Paraíso" (Acid Jazz Remix)	La Dosis	Hydro	check	Producer, Keyboards, Vocal Producer
2000	"Fruta Fresca"	Carlos Vives	Fruta Fresca (Single)		Producer, Keyboards, Remixer
2000	"Scent of Magnolia"	David Sylvian & Ryuichi Sakamoto	Everything and Nothing		Producer, Engineer, Keyboards
2000	"Sweet & Sassy" "Best Friend"	i5	i5		Producer, Keyboards, Vocal Producer
2001	"Blue Sky" "Fire!"	Outside	Out of the Dark	check	Producer, Keyboards, Vocal Producer, Engineer
2001	"Ooh La La"	Valeria	Ooh La La (Single)		Producer, Vocal Producer
2001	"Blue Sky"	Fila Brazillia	Another Late Night	check	Producer, Keyboards, Vocal Producer, Engineer
2001	"Jeder Gegen Jeden"	Roland Kaiser	Alles auf Anfang	check	Producer, Vocal Producer
2002	"One of these Days" feat. Ozomatli	Santana	Shaman		Keyboards, Engineer
2002	"Come Close to Me" feat. Mary J. Blige	Common	"Come Close to Me" feat. Mary J. Blige (Single)		Producer, Keyboards, Remixer, Vocal Producer
2002	"Toda La Vida" (Remix)	Imanol	Si Tú Supieras		Producer, Keyboards, Remixer, Vocal Producer
2002	"Elysium"	Sebastian Arocha Morton	Elysium (Original Motion Picture Soundtrack)	check	Producer, Composer Keyboards, Vocal Producer, Engineer
2002	"Esta Noche"	Kabah	La Vida Que Va		Producer, Remixer
2003	"You Were the Last High"	The Dandy Warhols	Welcome to the Monkey House		Producer, Keyboards, Remixer
2003	"Present"	Bonnie Pink	Present		Engineer, Vocal Producer
2003	"No Tengo Dinero" "Fuego" "Sabes a Chocolate"	Kumbia Kings	Los Remixes 2.0		Producer, Remixer
2003	"Crazy"	Javier	Crazy (Single)		Producer, Keyboards, Remixer, Vocal Producer
2003	"Not in Love" feat. Floetry	Enrique Iglesias	7		Producer, Keyboards, Remixer, Vocal Producer
2004	"You Were the Last High"	The Dandy Warhols	"You Were the Last High" Pt. 2		Producer, Keyboards, Remixer
2004	"Ya-Rayi"	Khaled	Ya-Rayi		Keyboards, Engineer
2004	"Never Coming Home"	Sting	Queer Eye For the Straight Guy (Soundtrack)		Producer, Keyboards, Remixer, Vocal Producer
2004	"Come Share the Wine"	Al Martino	Love of My Life	check	Songwriter
2004	"Amor o Love"	Kalimba	Aerosoul	check	Producer, Keyboards, Vocal Producer, Engineer
2004	"Llévate"	Kalimba	Aerosoul		Producer, Keyboards, Vocal Producer, Engineer
2004	"Anything" (ROCAsound Mix)	Lili Haydn	Light Blue Sun		Producer, Keyboards, Remixer
2004	"Whenever I Say Your Name"	Sting feat. Mary J. Blige	Love & Life		Producer, Remixer, Engineer, Vocal Engineer
2005	"A Kick In the Teeth" (ROCAsound Mix)	Fischerspooner	Odyssey		Producer, Remixer, Engineer
2005	"Looking for a New Love"	Jody Watley	"Looking for a New Love"		Producer, Keyboards, Remixer
2005	"Estatua de Hielo" "Por Verte Reir"	Adriana Mezzadri	Marcas de Ayer	check	Producer, Piano, Vocal Producer
2005	"Blue Sky"	Cafe Nirvana	Creme of Lounge	check	Producer, Keyboards, Vocal Producer, Engineer
2005	"Sugar Daddy" feat. Les Nubians	Yerbabuena	Creme of Lounge	check	Producer, Keyboards, Vocal Producer, Engineer
2006	"Super Freak" (ROCAsound Revamp)	Rick James	Little Miss Sunshine (Original Soundtrack)		Producer, Keyboards, Remixer, Vocal Producer
2006	"Make A Baby" "In the Middle of You"	Vikter Duplaix	Bold and Beautiful	check	Producer, Keyboards, Vocal Producer, Engineer
2006	"Fade It"	Vikter Duplaix	Bold and Beautiful		Producer, Keyboards, Vocal Producer, Engineer
2006	"Rise" (ROCAsound Mix)	Samantha James	Om Lounge, Vol. 10	check	Producer, Keyboards, Vocal Producer, Engineer
2006	"Gitana" feat. Sandra Echeverría "Sí, Sí, No, No" feat. María Conchita Alonso "Paraíso" "Bicycle Ride" "Santiago Trail" "Lamento" "Hike to the Lake"	Sebastian Arocha Morton	Americano (Original Motion Picture Soundtrack)	check	Producer, Keyboards, Vocal Producer, Engineer, String Arranger
2006	"Naturale"	Debi Nova	Americano (Original Motion Picture Soundtrack)	check	Producer, Keyboards, Vocal Producer, Engineer
2006	"Paralyzed" (ROCAsound Mix)	Rock Kills Kid	Paralyzed (Single)		Producer, Keyboards, Remixer, Vocal Producer
2007	"Third Stone from the Sun" "Don't Let No One Get You Down"	Lonnie Jordan	War Stories		Producer, Keyboards, Engineer
2007	"Rise" "Enchanted Life" "Breathe You In" "Angel Love" "Come Through" "Living Without You" "I Found You" "Deep Surprise" "Send It Out to The Universe" "Right Now"	Samantha James	Rise	check	Producer, Keyboards, Vocal Producer, Engineer
2007	"Africa Displaced"	A Race of Angels	Secret Love 4	check	Producer, Keyboards, Vocal Producer, Engineer
2007	"Todo Cambió" (ROCAsound Mix)	Camila	Todo Cambió		Producer, Remixer, Engineer
2007	"Yo Quiero" (ROCAsound Mix)	Camila	Todo Cambió		Producer, Remixer, Engineer
2008	"I'm a Fire" "It's Only Love"	Donna Summer	Crayons	check	Producer, Keyboards, Vocal Producer, Engineer
2008	"Inolvidable"	Reik	Un Día Más		Producer, Keyboards, Remixer, Vocal Producer
2008	"The Right Life"	Seal	The Right Life (Single)		Producer, Keyboards, Remixer, Vocal Producer
2008	"Breathe You In"	Roger Sanchez	Release Yourself, Vol. 7	check	Producer, Keyboards, Vocal Producer, Engineer
2008	"Ahora Entendí" "Ángel" "Se Me Va La Vida" "Eclipse Total del Amor" "Yo Por Él" "En Su Lugar" "Habla El Corazón" "Maldita Primavera" "Como Yo Nadie Te Ha Amado"	Yuridia	Remixes		Producer, Keyboards, Remixer, Vocal Producer
2009	"Alguien Como Tú" "Si Te Vas"	Luis Miguel	No Culpes a La Noche		Producer, Keyboards, Remixer, Vocal Producer
2009	"Rain"	Below Zero	Minus 1		Producer, Keyboards, Vocal Producer, Engineer
2009	"Right Now"	Samantha James	Hed Kandi: Served Chilled	check	Producer, Keyboards, Vocal Producer, Engineer
2009	"Amber Sky"	Samantha James	Om Lounge 15	check	Producer, Keyboards, Vocal Producer, Engineer
2009	"Rise (Acoustic Version)" "Come Through (Acoustic Version)" Angel Love (Acoustic Version)"	Samantha James	Rise (Acoustic Sessions)	check	Composer, Vocal Producer
2010	"Iron Man 2 Theme" "Mayhem in Monaco"	John Debney	Iron Man 2 (Original Motion Picture Soundtrack)		Electronic Music Producer
2010	"Waves of Change" "Subconscious" "Maybe Tomorrow"	Samantha James	Subconscious		Producer, Keyboards, Vocal Producer, Engineer
2010	"Veil" "Amber Sky" "Tonight" "Life Is Waiting" "Illusions" "Tree of Life" "Free" "Again and Again" "Find A Way"	Samantha James	Subconscious	check	Producer, Keyboards, Vocal Producer, Engineer
2010	"Waves of Change"	Kaskade	Dance.Love		Vocal Producer
2010	"Beyond Forever"	Bruce Sudano	Life and the Romantic	check	Producer, Keyboards, Vocal Producer, Engineer
2011	"Make A Baby" (Raga Version)	Vikter Duplaix	Suite 903	check	Producer, Keyboards, Vocal Producer, Engineer
2011	"Breathe You In" (Eric Kupper Mix)	Samantha James	Om Miami '08	check	Producer, Keyboards, Vocal Producer, Engineer
2012	"Dime" "Toda La Noche"	Sentidos Opuestos	Zona Preferente		Producer, Keyboards, Vocal Producer, Engineer
2012	"Alex Cross Theme" "MMA Entrance" "Picasso Seduces Women" "Alex Accesses Crime Scene" "Aqua Building" "Alex Profiles Killer" "Give Me a Name" "Picasso Takes Train" "Confronting Picasso" "Refrained Satisfaction" "Shutdown Courthouse Square"	John Debney	Alex Cross (Original Motion Picture Soundtrack)	check	Producer, Keyboards, Engineer, String Arranger
2012	"Rise" (King Kooba Mix)	Samantha James	Om Miami '12	check	Producer, Keyboards, Vocal Producer, Engineer
2012	"Rojo Violento"	Mario Frangoulis	Beautiful Things	check	Composer, Lyrics
2012	"Rojo Violento"	Mario Frangoulis	Live with the Boston Pops	check	Composer, Lyrics
2014	"RoboCop Title Card" "Mattox and Reporters" "First Day" "Omnicorp" "Restaurant Shootout" "Calling Home" "Uploading Data" "Explosion" "Vallon's Warehouse" "They're Going to Kill Him" "Rooftop" "Mattox is Down" "Clara and David"	Pedro Bromfman	RoboCop 2014 (Original Motion Picture Soundtrack)	check	Producer, Keyboards, Engineer, String Arranger
2014	"Houdini Flash Forward" "Cuffs" "Father gets Fired" "Hitting the Road" "Betting the Sheriff" "Jail Cell" "Chicago Jail Break" "Espionage" "Chinese Water Torture Unveiled" "Bullet Catch Lie" "Bullet Catch for the Kaiser" "Ringing Kremlin Bells" "Race Against the Clock" "Houdini Main Title" "Tub Full of Ice" "Straight Jacket Stunt" "Doing the Impossible" "Harry Strays" "Make Jenny Disappear" "Secrets" "WWI Montage" "Fortune Teller" "Houdini is Doomed" "Houdini Suite"	John Debney	Houdini Vol. 1 (Original Motion Picture Soundtrack)	check	Producer, Keyboards, Engineer, String Arranger
2014	"Opening" "Ray Jennings" "Seattle Transition" "Buffalo" "Game Tape" "Browns on the Clock"	John Debney	Draft Day (Original Motion Picture Soundtrack)	check	Producer, Keyboards, Engineer, String Arranger
2014	"Lunar Eclipse" "Daytime Gone" "Stillness Speaks"	Sebastian Arocha Morton	Themes from Elysium	check	Producer, Keyboards, Engineer, String Arranger
2015	"Escaping in a Bubble" "The End/Get Him" "Getting the Key" "Plankton Rescues Karen"	John Debney	The Spongebob Movie: Sponge Out of Water	check	Producer, Keyboards, Engineer, String Arranger
2015	"Foolish" (ROCAsound Mix)	Alpine	Yuck		Producer, Keyboards, Remixer, Vocal Producer
2016	"I'm a Fire"	Donna Summer	The Ultimate Collection	check	Producer, Keyboards, Vocal Producer, Engineer
2016	"Circuits" "Adrenaline Junkie" "Night Vision" "Algorhythmic" "Altered Code" "No Limits"	Sebastian Arocha Morton	Duality	check	Producer, Keyboards, Engineer, String Arranger
2016	"Neighborhood of My Dreams"	Bruce Sudano	With Angels On A Carousel		Producer, String Arranger
2019	"Signs" "Darkroom" "Red Pendulum"	Sebastian Arocha Morton	Neon	check	Producer, Keyboards, Engineer, String Arranger
2020	"I'm a Fire" "It's Only Love"	Donna Summer	Encore	check	Producer, Keyboards, Vocal Producer, Engineer

== See also ==
- Greg Kurstin production discography
