= Little Miss Sunshine (disambiguation) =

Little Miss Sunshine is a 2006 American tragicomedy road film.

Little Miss Sunshine may also refer to:

  - Little Miss Sunshine (musical), the 2006 musical of the film
  - Little Miss Sunshine (soundtrack), the soundtrack
- Little Miss Sunshine (character), a character in the Mr. Men & Little Miss children's books
  - Little Miss Sunshine and the Wicked Witch, a series "special"

== See also ==
- Little Miss Sunbeam, mascot of Sunbeam Bread
- Miss Sunshine (song) (2011), by German dance-band R.I.O.
