= So You Think You Can Dance Australia season 4 =

So You Think You Can Dance Australia
- Season 4
- Hosted by: Carrie Bickmore
- Judges: Paula Abdul; Shannon Holtzapffel; Jason Gilkison; Aaron Cash
- Winner: Michael Dameski
- Runner-up: Lauren Seymour

Release
- Original network: Network Ten
- Original release: 9 February – 1 May 2014

Season chronology
- ← Previous; Season 3

Season four of So You Think You Can Dance Australia, the Australian version of the American reality dance-off series So You Think You Can Dance, was hosted by Carrie Bickmore with Paula Abdul, Shannon Holtzapffel, Jason Gilkison and Aaron Cash acting as the judges.

The season consisted of 13 episodes in total. Weeks 1-3 were audition episodes, producing the Top 20 contestants who went on to appear in the performance episodes from Week 4 onwards.

As of season four onwards, the weekly results show, a staple of the series in seasons 1–3, has been cut from the show format and that only one episode will air each week as of the fourth season.

== Auditions ==
Auditions for the fourth season were held between September and October 2013 in Perth, Brisbane, Melbourne, Adelaide and Sydney.

== Studio Shows ==
=== Female contestants ===
Finalist	Age	Home State	Dance Specialty	Elimination date
Lauren Seymour	22	NSW	Lyrical Jazz	Runner-Up
Renelle Jones	23	NSW	Jazz	4th Place
Ashleigh Tavares	20	NSW	Jazz	24 April 2014
Eden Petrovski	20	NSW	Contemporary	17 April 2014
Zoey Black	22	NSW	Jazz	10 April 2014
Maddie Peat	19	NSW	Ballet	3 April 2014
Yukino McHugh	20	NSW	Urban	27 March 2014
Nadiah Idris	26	VIC	Dancehall	20 March 2014
Sally Hare	28	NSW	Hip-hop	9 March 2014
Kathaleen Fisher	19	NSW	Latin/Ballroom	2 March 2014

=== Male contestants ===
Finalist	Age	Home State	Dance Specialty	Elimination date
Michael Dameski	18	NSW	Contemporary	Winner
Jay Johns	21	NSW	Tap/Hip-hop	3rd Place
Sam Malseed	18	SA	Contemporary/Lyrical	24 Apr 2014
Youngkwang "Blond" Joung	30	NSW	Break boy	17 Apr 2014
Patric Kuo	20	NSW	Urban	10 April 2014
Stephen Perez	20	NSW	Jazz	3 April 2014
Chris Tsattalios	21	NSW	Commercial Jazz	27 March 2014
Jordan Turner	20	NSW	Contemporary	20 March 2014
Joel Rasmussen	27	QLD	Hip-hop	9 March 2014
Thabang Baloyi	21	NSW	Ballroom	2 March 2014

=== Results table ===
Week:	2/3	9/3	20/3	27/3	3/4	10/4^{1}	17/4	24/4	1/5
Contestants	Result								
Michael Dameski			Btm 6			Btm 4			Winner
Lauren Seymour					Btm 6	1st			Runner-Up
Jay Johns				Btm 6		3rd			3rd Place
Renelle Jones		Btm 6		Btm 6	Btm 6	3rd			4th Place
Sam Malseed						2nd		Elim	
Ashleigh Tavares						Btm 4		Elim	
Youngkwang "Blond" Joung		Btm 6		Btm 6	Btm 6	1st	Elim		
Eden Petrovski						2nd	Elim		
Patric Kuo			Btm 6		Btm 6	Elim			
Zoey Black	Btm 6		Btm 6			Elim			
Stephen Perez	Btm 6				Elim				
Maddie Peat				Btm 6	Elim				
Chris Tsattalios		Btm 6		Elim					
Yukino McHugh		Btm 6	Btm 6	Elim					
Jordan Turner			Elim						
Nadiah Idris	Btm 6		Elim						
Joel Rasmussen	Btm 6	Elim							
Sally Hare		Elim							
Thabang Baloyi	Elim								
Kathaleen Fisher	Elim								

== Performance Shows ==
=== Week 4: Top 20 (23 February 2014) ===
Couple	Style	Music	Choreographer	Result
Top 10 Boys	Hip-hop	"#ThatPower"—will.i.am feat. Justin Bieber	Matt Lee	
Lauren Seymour; Renelle Jones	Contemporary-Jazz	"She Wolf"—David Guetta feat. Sia	Stephen Tannos (season 2)	Both Safe
Youngkwang "Blond" Joung; Jay Johns; Joel Rasmussen; Nadiah Idris	Mixed Urban	"Do You Love Me"—The Contours	Christopher Scott	Rasmussen in Bottom 3 Idris in Bottom 3
Jordan Turner; Eden Petrovski; Maddie Peat	Contemporary	"Heart Cry" (Remix, extended version) — Drehz	Sarah Boulter	All Safe
Kathaleen Fisher; Thabang Baloyi	Latin Ballroom	"Where Have You Been"—Rihanna	Gleb Savchenko and Elena Samodanova	Both Eliminated
Top 20	Jazz	"Shine My Shoes" - Robbie Williams (Live Guest Performer)	Jason Gilkison	
Patric Kuo; Sally Hare; Yukino McHugh	Hip hop	"Talk Dirty"—Jason Derulo feat. 2 Chainz	Tiana Canterbury	All Safe
Zoey Black; Ashleigh Tavaras; Stephen Perez; Chris Tsattalios	Jazz	"Mamma Knows Best"—Jessie J	Marko Panzic (season 1)	Black in Bottom 3 Perez in Bottom 3
Michael Dameski; Sam Malseed	Contemporary	"Brother"—Matt Corby	Debbie Ellis	Both Safe
Top 10 Girls	Contemporary	"Young & Beautiful"—Lana Del Rey	Christopher Scott	

=== Week 5: Top 20 (2 March 2014) ===
- Group Dance: "Radioactive" – Imagine Dragons feat. Kendrick Lamar (Hip hop; Choreographer: Christopher Scott)

Couple	Style	Music	Choreographer	Results
Ashleigh Tavaras; Jay Johns	Jazz	"Happy"— Pharrell Williams	Simon Lynn	Both safe
Eden Petrovski; Youngkwang "Blond" Joung	Lyrical-Jazz	"Everybody Wants to Rule the World"— Lorde	Stephen Tannos (season 2)	Joung in Bottom 3
Sally Hare; Jordan Turner	Contemporary	"Addicted to you"— Avicii	Jason Winters	Hare in Bottom 3
Lauren Seymour; Patric Kuo	Lyrical hip-hop	"Fast Car"— Tracy Chapman	Christopher Scott	Both Safe
~~Kathaleen Fisher~~; Chris Tsattalios	Samba	"Natalie"— Bruno Mars	Aric & Masha	Fisher eliminated
Yukino McHugh; Stephen Perez	Broadway-Jazz	"Sing, Sing, Sing"— Benny Goodman Orchestra	Cameron Mitchell	McHugh in Bottom 3
Maddie Peat; ~~Thabang Baloyi~~	Viennese Waltz	"Unchained Melody"— The Righteous Brothers	Craig & Sriani	Peat Safe
Renelle Jones; Joel Rasmussen	Zouk-Lambada	"Climax"— Usher	Larissa & Kadu	Both in Bottom 3
Nadiah Idris; Michael Dameski	Hip hop	"Twerk It"— Busta Rhymes feat. Nicki Minaj	Tiana Canterbury	Both safe
Zoey Black; Sam Malseed	Contemporary	"Forever Young"— Audra Mae	Paul Malek	Both Safe

- Solos
  - Kathaleen Fisher: "Dance Again"— Jennifer Lopez feat. Pitbull
  - Nadiah Idris: "Waka Waka (This Time For Africa)" — Shakira
  - Zoey Black: "Love Will Never Do (Without You)" — Janet Jackson
  - Stephen Perez: "Are You Gonna Go My Way"— Lenny Kravitz
  - Thabang Baloyi: "Runaway"— Bruno Mars
  - Joel Rasmussen: "Get Ur Freak On"— Missy Elliott
- Eliminated
  - Kathaleen Fisher
  - Thabang Baloyi
- New Partners
  - Maddie Peat & Chris Tsattalios

=== Week 6: Top 18 (9 March 2014) ===
- Group Dance: "Blurred Lines" – Robin Thicke feat. T.I. and Pharrell Williams (Hip-hop; Choreographer: Parris Goebel) (performed with Shannon Holtzapffel)
- Musical Guest: Rudimental – "Free"

Couple	Style	Music	Choreographer	Results
Maddie Peat; Chris Tsattalios	Contemporary	"My Love" — Sia	Sarah Boulter	Both safe
Renelle Jones; ~~Joel Rasmussen~~	Jazz	"FU" — Miley Cyrus feat. French Montana	Renee Ritchie (season 3)	Rasmussen eliminated
Eden Petrovski; Youngkwang "Blond" Joung	Paso Doble	"Bring Me to Life" — Evanescence	Elena Samodanova	Both safe
Nadiah Idris; Michael Dameski	Cha-cha	"Timber" — Ke$ha feat. Pitbull	Anya Garnis	Both in Bottom 3
~~Sally Hare~~; Jordan Turner	Hip-hop	"As Long as You Love Me" — Justin Bieber feat. Big Sean	Alvin DeCastro	Hare eliminated
Yukino McHugh; Stephen Perez	Urban	"Dark Horse" — Katy Perry feat. Juicy J	Parris Goebel	McHugh in Bottom 3
Sam Malseed; Zoey Black	Bollywood	"1 2 3 4 Get on the Dance Floor" — Chennai Express (Original Soundtrack)	Ramona Lobo	Black in Bottom 3
Ashleigh Tavaras; Jay Johns	Contemporary	"One" — Damien Rice	Debbie Ellis	Both Safe
Lauren Seymour; Patric Kuo	Jazz	"Land of a Thousand Dances" (The Sapphires) — Jessica Mauboy	Adam Williams	Kuo in Bottom 3

- Solos
  - Sally Hare: "Pon de Floor" — Major Lazer feat. VYBZ Kartel
  - Renelle Jones: "The Lady Is A Tramp" — Tony Bennett feat. Lady Gaga
  - Yukino "Kino" McHugh: "Aqueous Transmission" — Incubus
  - Chris Tsattalios: "If I Had You" — Adam Lambert
  - Joel Rasmussen: "Touch It" — Busta Rhymes
  - Youngkwang "Blond" Joung: "Beats to the Rhyme" — Run DMC
- Eliminated
  - Sally Hare
  - Joel Rasmussen
- New Partners
  - Renelle Jones & Jordan Turner

=== Week 7: Top 16 (20 March 2014) ===
Guest Tina Arena - Reset All

Couple	Style	Music	Choreographer	Results
Eden Petrovski; Youngkwang "Blond" Joung	Contemporary	"Say Something" - A Great Big World feat. Christina Aguilera	Debbie Ellis	Joung in Bottom 3
Renelle Jones; ~~Jordan Turner~~	Broadway	"Ladies' Choice" (from Hairspray) - Zac Efron	Michael Ralph	Turner eliminated
Maddie Peat; Chris Tsattalios	Quickstep	"Bang Bang" - will.i.am	Leanne Bampton	Both in Bottom 3
Yukino McHugh; Stephen Perez	Jazz	"Locked Out of Heaven" - Bruno Mars	Adrian Ricks	McHugh in Bottom 3
Lauren Seymour; Patric Kuo	Viennese Waltz	"I Won't Give Up" - Jason Mraz	Anya Garnis	Both Safe
Sam Malseed; Zoey Black	Contemporary	"Unconditionally" - Katy Perry	Marko Panzic (season 1)	Both Safe
Ashleigh Tavares; Jay Johns	Lyrical hip-hop	"Hold On, We're Going Home" - Drake feat. Majid Jordan	Parris Goebel	Johns in Bottom 3
~~Nadiah Idris~~; Michael Dameski	Jazz	"Crazy" - Alice Russell	Stephen Tannos (season 2)	Idris eliminated

- Immediately Saved
  - Zoey Black
- Solos
  - Yukino "Kino" McHugh: "Please Don't Go" — Mike Posner
  - Nadiah Idris: "Work" — Ciara feat. Missy Elliott
  - Jordan Turner: "What You Wanted" — OneRepublic
  - Patric Kuo: "Pop" — *NSYNC
  - Michael Dameski: "Fall Dubstep Mix" — DJ X-5IGHT
- Eliminated^{2}
  - Nadiah Idris
  - Jordan Turner
- New Partners
  - Renelle Jones & Michael Dameski

=== Week 8: Top 14 (27 March 2014) ===
Couple	Style	Music	Choreographer	Results
Patric Kuo; Lauren Seymour	Contemporary	"The Power of Love" — Gabrielle Aplin	Natalie Weir	Both in Bottom 3
Eden Petrovski; Youngkwang "Blond" Joung	Hip-hop	"Let Me Love You (Until You Learn to Love Yourself)" — Ne-Yo	Juliette Verne	Joung in Bottom 3
Maddie Peat; ~~Chris Tsattalios~~	Jazz	"Call Me Maybe" — Carly Rae Jepsen	Mitchell Woodcock	Tsattalios eliminated
Jay Johns; Ashleigh Tavares	Rumba	"Stay" — Rihanna feat. Mikky Ekko	Anya Garnis	Both Safe
~~Yukino "Kino" McHugh~~; Stephen Perez	Jazz	"Titanium" — David Guetta feat. Sia	Stephen Tannos	McHugh eliminated
Zoey Black; Sam Malseed	Jive	"Footloose" — Kenny Loggins	Giselle Peacock	Both Safe
Renelle Jones; Michael Dameski	Contemporary	"Let Her Go" — Passenger	Paul Malek	Jones in Bottom 3

- Solos
  - Maddie Peat: "Eyes On Fire" - Blue Foundation
  - Yukino McHugh: "Brotsjór" - Ólafur Arnalds
  - Renelle Jones: "Hopeless Wonderer" - Mumford & Sons
  - Youngkwang "Blond" Joung: "Gonna Make You Sweat (Everybody Dance Now)" - C+C Music Factory
  - Chris Tsattalios: "Be My Lover" - INNA
  - Jay Johns: "Let's Go" - Travis Barker (feat. Yelawolf, Twista, Busta Rhymes & Lil Jon)
- Eliminated
  - Yukino McHugh
  - Chris Tsattalios
- New Partners ^{3}
  - Zoey Black & Lauren Seymour
  - Maddie Peat & Ashleigh Tavares
  - Eden Petrovski & Renelle Jones
  - Youngkwang "Blond" Joung & Michael Dameski
  - Patric Kuo & Jay Jones
  - Stephen Perez & Sam Malseed

=== Week 9: Top 12 (3 April 2014) ===
Theme: Same Gender - The contestants will be dancing routines with a partner of the same gender.

Couple	Style	Music	Choreographer	Results
Eden Petrovski; Renelle Jones	Broadway	"Mr. Bojangles" — Fosse	Adam Williams	Both Safe
Patric Kuo; Jay Johns	Hip-hop	"Give It Up Or Turn It Loose" — James Brown	Charles Bartley (season 2)	Kuo in bottom 2
Ashleigh Tavares; ~~Maddie Peat~~	Contemporary	"Higher Love" — James Vincent McMorrow	Jason Winters	Peat eliminated
Zoey Black; Lauren Seymour	Hip-hop	"MATANGI" — M.I.A.	Jesse Rasmussen (season 2)	Black in bottom 2
Michael Dameski; Youngkwang "Blond" Joung	Contemporary	"How It Ends" — DeVotchKa	Debbie Ellis	Dameski in Bottom 2
Sam Malseed; ~~Stephen Perez~~	Tango	"Tango De Los Asesinos (Assassin's Tango)" — John Powell	Fabio Robles; Ana André	Perez eliminated

- Solos
  - Renelle Jones:
  - Maddie Peat: "Fix You" - Coldplay
  - Lauren Seymour:
  - Patric Kuo:
  - Youngkwang "Blond" Joung:
  - Stephen Perez:
- Eliminated
  - Maddie Peat
  - Stephen Perez
- Next Week's Partners
  - Patric Kuo & Ashleigh Tavaras
  - Youngkwang "Blond" Joung & Lauren Seymour
  - Jay Johns & Zoey Black
  - Sam Malseed & Eden Petrovski
  - Michael Dameski & Renelle Jones

=== Week 10: Top 10 (10 April 2014) ===
Couple	Style	Music	Choreographer	Results
Renelle Jones; Michael Dameski	Jazz	"Die Another Day" — Madonna	Mitchell Woodcock	Both Bottom 2
Ashleigh Tavares; ~~Patric Kuo~~	Cha-cha	"Move" — Little Mix	Aric & Masha	Kuo eliminated
Lauren Seymour; Youngkwang "Blond" Joung	Contemporary	"Threads of Silence" — Karise Eden	Paul Malek	both safe
Eden Petrovski; Sam Malseed	Hip-hop	"The Other Side" — Jason Derulo	Jesse Rasmussen (season 2)	both safe
~~Zoey Black~~; Jay Johns	Contemporary	"Wild Horses" - Natasha Bedingfield	Brendan Yeates	Black eliminated
Top 5 Girls	Jazz	"Grown Woman" - Beyoncé	Marko Panzic (season 1)	
Top 5 Boys	Contemporary	"Wake Me Up" - Avicii	Debbie Ellis	

- Solos
  - Zoey Black:
  - Ashleigh Tavares:
  - Patric Kuo:
  - Michael Dameski:
- Eliminated
  - Zoey Black
  - Patric Kuo

=== Week 11: Quarter-Final: Top 8 (17 April 2014) ===
Couple	Style	Music	Choreographer	Results
~~Eden Petrovski~~; Michael Dameski	Jazz	"Come into My Head" - Kimbra	Stephen Tannos (season 2)	Dameski safe
Renelle Jones; Jay Johns	Contemporary	Amazing Grace — Destiny's Child	Penelope Mullen	both Safe
Ashleigh Tavares; ~~Youngkwang "Blond" Joung~~	Swing	"Swing Set" - Jurassic 5	Shannon & Lochlan	Joung eliminated
Lauren Seymour; Sam Malseed	Contemporary	"My Heart Will Go On" - Céline Dion*^{4}	Jacqui Howard	both safe
Renelle Jones; Jay Johns	Paso Doble	El Tango De Roxanne — Moulin Rouge!	Aric Yegudkin & Masha Belash	both Safe
~~Eden Petrovski~~; Michael Dameski	Foxtrot	"Get Here" - Oleta Adams	Natalie Lowe	Petrovski eliminated
Lauren Seymour; Sam Malseed	Hip hop	OMG — Usher feat. will.i.am	Alvin De Castro	both safe
Ashleigh Tavares; ~~Youngkwang "Blond" Joung~~	Contemporary	Dark Paradise — Lana Del Rey	Steven Watson & Sarah Boulter	Joung eliminated

- Eliminated
  - Eden Petrovski
  - Youngkwang "Blond" Joung

=== Week 12 Semi Final: Top 6 (24 April 2014) ===
Couple	Style	Music	Choreographer
The Top 6	Contemporary	"Undan Hulu" — Ólafur Arnalds	Travis Wall; Channing Cooke
Lauren Seymour; Jay Johns	Hip-hop	"Get Up Offa That Thing"/"Release the Pressure"— James Brown	Jesse Rasmussen (season 2)
Renelle Jones; ~~Sam Malseed~~	Samba	"L'Hotel De Californie" — The Cat Empire	Trent Whiddon; Gordana Grandosek-Whiddon
~~Ashleigh Tavares~~; Michael Dameski	Jazz	"The Beautiful People" — Marilyn Manson	Matt Lee; Kate Wormald (season 1)
Lauren Seymour; ~~Sam Malseed~~	Contemporary	"In This Shirt" — The Irrepressibles	Debbie Ellis
~~Ashleigh Tavares~~; Jay Johns	Contemporary	"And I Am Telling You I'm Not Going" — Jennifer Hudson (Dreamgirls Soundtrack)	Sarah Boulter
Renelle Jones; Michael Dameski	Contemporary	"Lay Me Down" — Sam Smith	Travis Wall; Channing Cooke

- Solos
  - Lauren Seymour: "Mama Do (Uh Oh, Uh Oh)" — Pixie Lott (Contemporary)
  - Ashleigh Tavares: "Feeling Good" — Jennifer Hudson (Contemporary)
  - Renelle Jones: "Crazy In Love" — Emile Sandé feat. The Bryan Ferry Orchestra (Jazz)
  - Sam Malseed: "When I Was Your Man" — Bruno Mars (Contemporary)
  - Jay Johns: "Hey Pachuco!" — Royal Crown Revue (Tap)
  - Michael Dameski: "Unstoppable!" — E.S. Posthumus (Contemporary)
- Eliminated
  - Ashleigh Tavares
  - Sam Malseed

=== Week 13 Grand Final: Top 4 (1 May 2014) ===
- Musical Guests: Jason Derulo featuring Snoop Dogg – "Wiggle" / Sam Smith – "Stay with Me" / Ed Sheeran - Sing

Dancers	Style	Music	Choreographer
The Top 4	Jazz	"Applause"—Lady Gaga	Squared Division
Lauren Seymour; Michael Dameski	Contemporary	"Falling Slowly"—Glen Hansard & Markéta Irglová	Debbie Ellis
Renelle Jones; Jay Johns	Viennese Waltz	"At This Moment"—Michael Bublé	Aric & Masha
Renelle Jones; Lauren Seymour	Broadway	"I'm a Woman"—Smokey Joe's Cafe	Matt Lee
Michael Dameski; Jay Johns	Martial arts/Contemporary	"Invictus"—Patrick Mazzolo	Sarah Boulter
The Top 20	Jazz	"Dream Medley"—Paula Abdul	Matt Lee
The Top 20 ^{5}	Lindy Hop	"Jumpin' Jack"—Big Bad Voodoo Daddy	Jason Gilkison

- 4th Place:
  - Renelle Jones
- 3rd Place
  - Jay Johns
- Runner-Up:
  - Lauren Seymour
- Winner:
  - Michael Dameski

== Notes ==
- ^1The ranking of each gender was revealed this week.
- ^2On this occasion, the judges voiced indecision on the contestants to be eliminated and ultimately opted to determine the eliminated contestants directly according to the at-home viewer votes.
- ^3For Top 12 week, the contestants will be dancing in same-sex partnerships.
- ^4For this week, Malseed & Seymour performed to an on-stage piano accompaniment rather than the original song.
- ^5On this occasion, the Top 20 performed with Dameski & Seymour for a final dance number before announcing the winner.
