= Fame (The Game) =

Single by Donna Summer

from the album Crayons
- Released: November 19, 2008
- Recorded: 2008
- Genre: Pop; dance-pop
- Label: Burgundy
- Songwriters: Toby Gad; Donna Summer
- Producer: Toby Gad

Donna Summer singles chronology
"It's Only Love" (2008)	"Fame (The Game)" (2008)	"To Paris with Love" (2010)

"Fame (The Game)" is a song by Donna Summer, released as the fourth and final single from her 2008 studio album Crayons. The song was written by Summer and Toby Gad, and produced by Gad. It was released on November 19, 2008, by Burgundy. It reached No. 1 on the Billboard Hot Dance Club Play chart.

== Charts ==
=== Weekly charts ===
Chart (2009)	Peak position
US Dance Club Songs (Billboard)	1

=== Year-end charts ===
Chart (2009)	Position
US Dance Club Songs (Billboard)	36

== See also ==
- List of number-one dance singles of 2009 (U.S.)
