= Stamp Your Feet =

Single by Donna Summer

from the album Crayons
- Released: April 15, 2008
- Genre: Dance-pop, R&B
- Length: 3:40
- Label: Burgundy
- Songwriters: Donna Summer, Danielle Brisebois, Greg Kurstin
- Producer: Greg Kurstin

Donna Summer singles chronology
"I'm a Fire" (2008)	"Stamp Your Feet" (2008)	"It's Only Love" (2008)

"Stamp Your Feet" is a song by American singer Donna Summer. It was released on April 15, 2008 by Sony Burgundy as the second single from her 2008 album Crayons. The song was written by Summer, Danielle Brisebois, and Greg Kurstin, who also produced the track.

== American Idol performance ==
Summer performed "Stamp Your Feet" on the Season 7 finale of American Idol. Summer performed the single along with the six female finalists of the series as background singers.

== Official Mixes ==
- DiscoTech Remix – 5:37
- Escape & Coluccio Club Mix – 8:26
- Escape & Coluccio Radio Edit – 3:51
- Granite & Sugarman Remix – 8:11
- Granite & Sugarman Mixshow - 5:15
- Jason Nevins Extended Mix – 7:08
- Jason Nevins Radio Mix – 3:45
- Ranny's Big Room Mix – 7:26
- Ranny's Radio – 3:58
- Ranny's Mixshow - 5:42*
- Jason Nevins Mixshow - 5:28*
- Escape & Coluccio Mixshow - 5:28*
- DiscoTech Mixshow Edit - 4:25*

* - private mixes

== Chart performance ==
"Stamp Your Feet" became Summer's 14th number-one entry overall on Billboard's Hot Dance Club Play chart. She also scored her first back-to-back number-one singles on this chart since 1999.

Chart (2008)	Peak position
CIS Airplay (TopHit)	88
Germany (GfK)	88
US Dance Club Songs (Billboard)	1
US Dance/Songs Global (Billboard)	28

== In popular culture ==
- In 2018, the song was included in the Broadway musical Summer: The Donna Summer Musical.
