= Little Miss Sunshine (soundtrack) =

Little Miss Sunshine (Original Motion Picture Soundtrack)

Soundtrack album by Various Artists
- Released: July 11, 2006
- Genre: Soundtrack
- Length: 46:31
- Label: Lakeshore Records
- Producer: Various Artists

The soundtrack for Little Miss Sunshine is a mix of indie rock and folk music. DeVotchKa provides the majority of the music on the soundtrack, and also the score, which they did with Mychael Danna. There are also selections from Sufjan Stevens, Rick James, and Tony Tisdale featured on the album. The song heard on the trailer featured on TV was "Coming Home" by The 88. The Internet trailer was accompanied by "The Yeah Yeah Yeah Song (With All Your Power)" by The Flaming Lips.

== Track listing ==
1. "The Winner Is" – Mychael Danna and DeVotchKa (Score)
2. "Till the End of Time" - DeVotchKa
3. "You Love Me (Remix)" – DeVotchKa
4. "First Push" – Mychael Danna and DeVotchKa (Score)
5. "No Man's Land" – Sufjan Stevens
6. "Let's Go" – Mychael Danna and DeVotchKa (Score)
7. "No One Gets Left Behind" – Mychael Danna and DeVotchKa (Score)
8. "Chicago" – Sufjan Stevens
9. "We're Gonna Make It" – Mychael Danna and DeVotchKa (Score)
10. "Do You Think There's a Heaven" – Mychael Danna and DeVotchKa (Score)
11. "Catwalkin'" – Tony Tisdale
12. "Superfreak" (Rocasound Revamp) – Rick James
13. "La Llorona" – Music by Luís Martz, Arranged by DeVotchKa
14. "How It Ends" – DeVotchKa

== Credits ==
- Score Composed by Mychael Danna and DeVotchKa
- Executive Soundtrack Producers for Lakeshore Records: Skip Williamson and Brian McNelis
- Executive Soundtrack Album Producers: Susan Jacobs, Jonathan Dayton, Valerie Faris, and Peter Saraf
- A & R for Lakeshore: Eric Craig
- Art Director: Stephanie Mente
- Layout by Joe Chavez

== Reviews ==
- Elisabeth Vincentelli of Amazon.com says, "The CD actually has a rather uniform tone, and mercifully it's a lovely one. Composer Mychael Danna is paired with the Denver band DeVotchKa, who perform his score and offer a few tunes of their own. Making excellent use of strings, tuba, and squeezebox, they set a mood that echoes the movie's warmly idiosyncratic one." Clarification: the score songs are built from instrumental arrangements of original Devotchka songs, notably "We're Gonna Make It" and "The Winner Is" draw heavily from 2004's NPR album of the year, "How it Ends".
- Jonathan Jarry called the soundtrack "an intriguing experiment in smaller folk sounds with a slight Eastern European twist, an American polka for dysfunctional families and the malaise of life."
