= Subconscious (song) =

- Subconscious

Single by Samantha James

from the album Subconscious
- Released: June 16, 2010
- Recorded: Home studio
- Genre: R&B; deep house
- Label: Om Records
- Songwriter(s): Samantha James & Shane Drasin
- Producer(s): Shane Drasin

Samantha James singles chronology
"Waves of Change" (2010)	"Subconscious" (2010)	"Illusions" (2010)

"Subconscious" is a song by American singer Samantha James, released as the second single from her second album, Subconsious.

== Music video ==
A music video was shot for "Subconscious" and was released as a video montage on Samantha James' official Om Records page.

== Track listing ==
Subconscious
No.	Title	Length
1.	"Subconscious (Original Mix)"	5:53
2.	"Subconscious (Eric Kupper Remix)"	7:41
3.	"Subconscious (Marques Wyatt Deep Classic Remix)"	6:29
4.	"Subconscious (Nacho Marco Remix)"	7:59
5.	"Subconscious (Them Jeans Remix)"	5:41
6.	"Subconscious (Lee Foss Subconscious Strawberry Remix)"	5:32
7.	"Subconscious (Strobe Remix)"	8:19
8.	"Subconscious (Instrumental Mix)"	5:56
