= Los Remixes 2.0 =

Remix album by A.B. Quintanilla y Los Kumbia Kings
- Released: April 6, 2004
- Recorded: 2002–2004
- Genre: Cumbia, Latin pop
- Label: EMI Latin
- Producer: A.B. Quintanilla III; Cruz Martínez

A.B. Quintanilla y Los Kumbia Kings chronology
| La Historia (2003) | Los Remixes 2.0 (2004) | Fuego (2004) |

Singles from Los Remixes 2.0
- 1. "Sabes a Chocolate" Released: March 22, 2004

Professional ratings
Review scores
| Source | Rating |
|---|---|
| AllMusic | 1.5/5 stars |

Los Remixes 2.0 (English: The Remixes 2.0) is the second remix album and seventh album by Mexican-American cumbia group A.B. Quintanilla y Los Kumbia Kings and the second remix album by Mexican-American musician A.B. Quintanilla. It was released on April 6, 2004, by EMI Latin. It includes a cover of a song by Menudo, "Sabes a Chocolate". Los Kumbia Kings member Abel Talamántez was himself a member of Menudo before.

== Track listing ==
| No. | Title | Writer(s) | Producer(s) | Length |
|---|---|---|---|---|
| 1. | "Sabes a Chocolate" | Carlos Villa De La Torre, Alejandro Monroy Fernández | Quintanilla III, Martínez | 3:46 |
| 2. | "Thug Like Me (Koo Koo)" (featuring Dapper Don) | Anthony R. Gongora, Anthony López | Quintanilla III, Robert "BoBBo" Gomez | 3:45 |
| 3. | "I Wish" | A.B. Quintanilla III, Cruz Martínez, Abel Talamántez, Frank Pangelinan, Jacob Ceniceros | Quintanilla III, Martínez | 3:37 |
| 4. | "No Tengo Dinero (Seb on the Beach House Mix)" | Juan Gabriel | Quintanilla III, Martínez, ROCAsound | 7:01 |
| 5. | "Sabes a Chocolate (ROCAsound Electro Phonk Mix)" | De La Torre, Fernández | Quintanilla III, Martínez, ROCAsound | 6:36 |
| 6. | "Insomnio (ROCAsound Club Mix)" | Quintanilla III, Luigi Giraldo, Chris Pérez | Quintanilla III, Martínez, ROCAsound | 6:15 |
| 7. | "No Tengo Dinero (Jorge HM: Deep Remix)" | Gabriel | Quintanilla III, Martínez, Nopal Beat | 4:59 |
| 8. | "Amores Como el Tuyo (ROCAsound Mix)" | Quintanilla III, Martínez, Giraldo | Quintanilla III, Martínez, ROCAsound | 5:14 |
| 9. | "No Tengo Dinero (Double Helix: Acid Kumbia Remix)" | Gabriel | Quintanilla III, Martínez, Nopal Beat | 6:01 |
| 10. | "Insomnio (Mano a Mano Remix)" | Quintanilla III, Giraldo, Pérez | Quintanilla III, Martínez, Pavel De Jesús | 3:37 |
| 11. | "Sabes a Chocolate (Licuado Tropical Mix)" | De La Torre, Fernández | Quintanilla III, Martínez, Elvin F. Torres Serrant, Javier Bermudez, Ramiro Matos | 3:45 |
| 12. | "Mi Gente (King of Banda Mix)" (featuring Ozomatli) | Quintanilla III, Asdru Sierra, Jiro Yamaguchi, Raúl Pacheco, Justin Poree, Giraldo, Nir Seroussi | Quintanilla III, Martínez, Omar Valenzuela, Adolfo Valenzuela | 10:59 |

== Personnel ==
Kumbia Kings

- A.B. Quintanilla III – bass guitar, backing vocals, producer, composer
- Fernando "Nando" Domínguez III – vocals
- Frank "Pangie" Pangelinan – vocals
- Abel Talamántez – vocals
- Irvin "Pee Wee" Salinas – vocals
- Anthony "Nino B" López – backing vocals, rap (track 2), dancer
- Juan Jesús "JP" Peña – backing vocals, dancer
- Cruz Martínez – keyboards, producer, composer
- Chris Pérez – guitar
- Robert "BoBBo" Gomez III – keyboards, producer
- "El Animal" Noe "Gipper" Nieto Jr. – accordion
- Robert "Robbie" Del Moral – drums
- Luigi Giraldo – keyboards, composer

Former Kumbia Kings members

- Jason "DJ Kane" Cano – vocals
- Francisco "Frankie J" Bautista Jr. – vocals

Additional musicians and production

- Javier Bermudez – remixer, additional producer
- Dapper Don – vocals (track 2)
- Pavel De Jesús – remixer, additional producer
- Gerardo Garmendia – photography, graphic design
- Nelson Gonzalez – art direction
- Ramiro Matos – remixer, additional producer
- Brian "Red" Moore – mixing
- Ricky Morales – art direction
- Nopal Beat – remixer, additional producer
- Ozomatli – vocals (track 12)
- ROCAsound – remixer, additional producer
- Elvin F. Torres Serrant – remixer, additional producer
- "Big Bert" Treviño – project and studio coordinator
- Don C. Tyler – mastering
- Adolfo Valenzuela – remixer, additional producer
- Omar Valenzuela – remixer, additional producer

== Charts ==
| Chart (2004) | Peak position |
|---|---|
| US Top Latin Albums (Billboard) | 11 |
| US Top Dance/Electronic Albums (Billboard) | 3 |
| US Latin Pop Albums (Billboard) | 3 |

== Sales and certifications ==
| Region | Certification | Certified units/sales |
|---|---|---|
| United States (RIAA) | Platinum (Latin) | 100,000^{^} |
^{^} Shipments figures based on certification alone.
