= Crayons (album) =

Studio album by Donna Summer
- Released: May 20, 2008
- Recorded: 2006–2008
- Genres: Dance-pop; R&B
- Length: 50:18
- Label: Burgundy
- Producers: Nathan DiGesare; Toby Gad; Jamie Houston; Greg Kurstin; Lester Mendez; Sebastian Arocha Morton; J. R. Rotem

Donna Summer chronology
Gold (2005)	Crayons (2008)	Love to Love You Donna (2013)

Singles from Crayons
- 1. "I'm a Fire" Released: March 11, 2008; 2. "Stamp Your Feet" Released: April 15, 2008; 3. "It's Only Love" Released: August 5, 2008 (US); 4. "Fame (The Game)" Released: November 19, 2008

Crayons is the seventeenth and final studio album by American singer Donna Summer. It was released through Sony Burgundy on May 20, 2008, in the United States. Recorded over a period of two years since signing with the Sony Music label in 2006, Crayons marked Summer's first full-length studio album in fourteen years since 1994's Christmas Spirit, and her first album of original material since 1991's Mistaken Identity. She worked with a number of different producers and songwriters on the album, including Greg Kurstin, J. R. Rotem, Wayne Hector, Toby Gad, Lester Mendez.

The album debuted and peaked at number 17 on the US Billboard 200 and entered the top fifty of the Italian Albums Chart. Crayons was preceded by its first official single, "Stamp Your Feet", which was released to radio on April 15, 2008. A follow-up, "I'm a Fire", reached number-one on the US Dance Club Songs, giving Summer her 13th number-one hit on that chart. Crayons marked Summer's last album released before her death on May 17, 2012.

== Background ==
Crayons marked Summer's first full-length studio album in fourteen years since 1994's Christmas Spirit. When commenting on the album, Summer explained, "I wanted this album to have a lot of different directions on it [...] I did not want it to be any one baby. I just wanted it to be a sampler of flavors and influences from all over the world. There's a touch of this, a little smidgeon of that, a dash of something else [...] like when you're cooking." The lead track "Stamp Your Feet" was originally called "The Player's Anthem" and talks about "being a player in life, coupled with the idea of being a player on an actual field, the whole thing, dealing with the pain and doing things even though you are afraid."

Summer wrote "The Queen Is Back" and "Mr. Music" with Jonathan "J.R." Rotem and Evan Bogart, whose father, Casablanca Records boss Neil Bogart, died from cancer at the age of 39. When Summer met Evan Bogart, she was struck by his uncanny resemblance to his label executive father, commenting: "Evan and I hit it off immediately; there was a synergy that happened really quickly." "The Queen Is Back", which discusses her musical legacy and public persona, samples "Lose Control" by Kevin Federline. Both songs were produced by Rotem. About the song "Crayons", Summer said, "It encompasses a lot of what the album is about [...] Everybody gets crayons at some point in their lives, everybody can relate to the basics. It comes down to that child in us, I think there's a commonality in the concept of crayons."

== Critical reception ==
Professional ratings
Aggregate scores
Source	Rating
Metacritic	66/100
Review scores
Source	Rating
AllMusic	2.5/5 stars
BBC	(favorable)
Boston Herald	B
Canoe.ca	3/5 stars
Digital Spy	2/5 stars
The Guardian	2/5 stars
Okayplayer	78/100
Slant Magazine	3/5 stars
USA Today	3/4 stars

At Metacritic, which assigns a normalized rating out of 100 to reviews from mainstream critics, Crayons has an average score of 66 based on 12 reviews, indicating "generally favorable reviews". Billboard felt that "this surprisingly lively set finds the former disco diva teaming with a crew of young collaborators for a series of uptempo forays into stomping dance-pop, juke-joint blues-rock, breezy Latin jazz and African-accented soul." Christian John Wikane from PopMatters wrote that "the core theme of Crayons is variety. It brazenly flaunts a collage of sounds, while showcasing the multiplicity of Donna Summer's musical selves." In his review for The Village Voice, Alfred Soto found that "on Crayons, it's like no time has passed at all, and of course it hasn't: As Lloyd Richards says to Margo Channing in All About Eve, the stars never die and never change."

AllMusic editor Andy Kellman found that Crayons "benefits from Summer's effortless energy; she was clearly into making this album, and her voice is as able and flexible as ever. However, almost all of the material with which she has to work [...] would make more sense on an album by a female teen pop group from the UK or, in some cases, a young adult catering to the coffeehouse market [...] In-fashion vocal effects, which Summer certainly does not need, detract from a handful of these tracks, but as a whole, the album won't have trouble pleasing fans who just want to hear their queen have a blast and tear it up." Slant Magazine critic Eric Henderson wrote that the album was Summer's "attempt to finally share, but the results are about as personal as food-dyed wax. The music is harmlessly listenable, and the requisite nods to her dance-floor legacy."

== Commercial performance ==
Crayons debuted and peaked at number 17 on the US Billboard 200 first-week sales of 23,000 units, marking Summer's highest-charting album since her 1983 album She Works Hard for the Money. By November 2008, it had moved 69,000 copies in the United States.

== Track listing ==
No.	Title	Writer(s)	Producer(s)	Length
1.	"Stamp Your Feet"	Danielle Brisebois; Greg Kurstin; Donna Summer	Kurstin	3:52
2.	"Mr. Music"	Evan Bogart; J. R. Rotem; Donna Summer; Meredith Willson	Rotem	3:14
3.	"Crayons" (featuring Ziggy Marley)	Brisebois; Kurstin; Marley; Summer	Kurstin	3:21
4.	"The Queen Is Back"	Bogart; Rotem; Summer	Rotem	3:27
5.	"Fame (The Game)"	Toby Gad; Summer	Gad	4:03
6.	"Sand on My Feet"	Gad; Summer	Gad	3:51
7.	"Drivin' Down Brazil"	Brisebois; Kurstin; Summer	Kurstin	4:43
8.	"I'm a Fire"	Al Kasha; Sebastian Arocha Morton; Summer	Morton	7:11
9.	"Slide Over Backwards"	Nathan DiGesare; Jakob Petren; Summer	DiGesare	4:10
10.	"Science of Love"	Gad; Summer	Gad	3:48
11.	"Be Myself Again"	Wayne Hector; Lester Mendez; Summer	Mendez	4:19
12.	"Bring Down the Reign"	Jamie Houston; Fred Kron; Summer	Houston	4:33

International edition bonus track
No.	Title	Writer(s)	Producer	Length
13.	"It's Only Love"	Kasha; Morton; Summer	Morton	6:58

iTunes bonus track
No.	Title	Writer(s)	Producer	Length
14.	"I'm a Fire" (Matty Soulflower Club Mix)	Kasha; Morton; Summer	Morton	9:00

== Charts ==
Chart (2008)	Peak position
Belgian Albums (Ultratop Flanders)	77
German Albums (Offizielle Top 100)	73
Italian Albums (FIMI)	42
Spanish Albums (Promusicae)	97
Swiss Albums (Schweizer Hitparade)	85
UK R&B Albums (Official Charts)	24
US Billboard 200	17
US Top R&B/Hip-Hop Albums (Billboard)	5

== Certifications ==
Region	Certification	Certified units/sales
Russia (NFPF)	Gold	10,000^{*}
^{*} Sales figures based on certification alone.

== Release history ==
List of release dates, showing region, formats, and label
Region	Date	Format(s)	Label
United States	May 20, 2008	CD; digital download	Burgundy Records
Canada	May 20, 2008	CD; digital download	Burgundy Records
Denmark	May 26, 2008	CD; digital download	Burgundy Records
Germany	June 6, 2008	CD; digital download	Burgundy Records
Australia	June 7, 2008	CD; digital download	Burgundy Records
France	June 9, 2008	CD; digital download	Burgundy Records
Spain	June 10, 2008	CD; digital download	Burgundy Records
Brazil	June 16, 2008	CD; digital download	Burgundy Records
United Kingdom	June 23, 2008	CD; digital download	Burgundy Records
Japan	June 25, 2008	CD; digital download	Burgundy Records
Europe	Jan. 13, 2023	vinyl	Sony Music
