= 100 Lovers =

Studio album by DeVotchKa
- Released: February 28, 2011
- Studios: Wavelab, Tucson, Arizona; NFA, Denver, Colorado
- Genres: Indie folk, gypsy punk
- Length: 44:38
- Label: Anti-
- Producers: Craig Schumacher; DeVotchKa

DeVotchKa chronology
I Love You, Philip Morris (2009)	100 Lovers (2011)	This Night Falls Forever (2018)

100 Lovers is the sixth studio album by American indie folk band DeVotchKa. It was released by Anti- Records on February 28, 2011.

== Release ==
The first music video "100 Other Lovers" was released on February 3, 2011, and directed by Chloe Rodham.

Devotchka released the music video to "All the Sand in All the Sea" on their official YouTube on February 15, 2011.

== Critical reception ==
Professional ratings
Aggregate scores
Source	Rating
AnyDecentMusic?	6.4/10
Metacritic	72/100
Review scores
Source	Rating
AllMusic	3.5/5 stars
The Austin Chronicle	4/5 stars
The A.V. Club	B
Consequence of Sound	B
Los Angeles Times	3.5/5 stars
Paste	7.8/10
Pitchfork	5.3/10
PopMatters	7/10
Slant Magazine	2.5/5 stars
Tiny Mix Tapes	2/5 stars

100 Lovers was met with "generally favorable" reviews from critics. At Metacritic, which assigns a weighted average rating out of 100 to reviews from mainstream publications, this release received an average score of 72 based on 18 reviews. At AnyDecentMusic?, the album was given a 6.4 out of 10 based on a critical consensus 17 reviews.

The AllMusic review by James Christopher Monger stated, "It's a melting pot to be sure, and the band has a tendency to go heavy on the atmosphere and light on the hooks, but there’s never any doubt that it’s a brew tended over by some awfully talented cooks." At Pitchfork, David Bevan wrote: "100 Lovers, with its interludes, clever sequencing, and the appropriately titled instrumental "Sunshine", feels less like a grouping of songs as it does an entirely different animal altogether." Melanie Haupt of The Austin Chronicle gave a four out of five stars, describing the instrumentation on the album "more lushly realized than ever." At Los Angeles Times, writer Randy Lewis explained: "DeVotchKa creates music that explodes with the desperate passion of someone standing at the end of a pier, or lost in the middle of a desert."

In a review for Paste, critic reviewer Steve LaBate wrote: "DeVotchKa's fifth studio LP, 100 Lovers, begins with a gorgeously moody and cinematic wash of synths, strings and piano seeping forth as if water through a crack in a dam. From beneath this swirl of sound, a steady-marching drumbeat subtly emerges, pressure building slowly at first but then more and more rapidly until, finally, the wall holding back the floodwaters bursts in a majestic symphonic crescendo."

== Track listing ==
All tracks are written by Nick Urata and DeVotchKa.

100 Lovers track listing
No.	Title	Length
1.	"The Alley"	5:04
2.	"All the Sand in All the Seas"	4:50
3.	"100 Other Lovers"	4:11
4.	"The Common Good"	4:26
5.	"Interlude 1"	0:40
6.	"The Man from San Sebastian"	3:44
7.	"Exhaustible"	3:30
8.	"Interlude 2"	0:23
9.	"Bad Luck Heels"	4:15
10.	"Ruthless"	4:48
11.	"Contrabanda"	3:54
12.	"Sunshine"	4:55

== Personnel ==
- DeVotchKa:
  - Vocals, guitar: Nick Urata
  - Sousaphone: Jeanie Schroder
  - Drums: Shawn King
  - Piano: Thomas Hagerman
- Strings:
  - Violin 1: Regan Kane
  - Violin 2: Takanori Sugishita
  - Violin 3: Ilya Goldberg
  - Viola 1: Summer Rhodes
  - Viola 2: Lisa Jablonowski
  - Cello 1: Charles Lee
  - Cello 2: Eleanor Wells
- Wind
  - Bandoneon: Evan Orman
  - Tenor/Baritone Saxophone: Dan Sjogren
- Trumpets
  - Chris Barron
  - Derek Banach
  - Jacob Valenzuela
- Percussion
  - Mauro Refosco

== Charts ==
Chart performance for 100 Lovers
Chart (2011)	Peak position
US Billboard 200	70
US Independent Albums (Billboard)	9
US Top Alternative Albums (Billboard)	12
US Top Rock Albums (Billboard)	17
US Indie Store Album Sales (Billboard)	6
