= I'm a Fire =

Single by Donna Summer

from the album Crayons
- Released: March 11, 2008
- Recorded: 2007
- Genre: House; electropop; hi-NRG; disco; dance-pop
- Length: 7:11
- Label: Burgundy
- Songwriters: Donna Summer; Sebastian Arocha Morton; Al Kasha
- Producer: Sebastian Arocha Morton

Donna Summer singles chronology
"I Got Your Love" (2005)	"I'm a Fire" (2008)	"Stamp Your Feet" (2008)

"I'm a Fire" is the first single from Donna Summer's seventeenth studio album, Crayons. The song was released on March 11, 2008 by Burgundy Records. It was written by Summer, Sebastian Morton and Al Kasha and produced by Morton. The club single reached No. 1 on the Billboard Hot Dance Club Play chart, giving Summer her 13th number-one and giving her the longest timespan between first (1975) and most recent (2008) Hot Dance Club Play chart #1s, Madonna has been the only artist to match this feat so far.

== Composition ==
"I'm a Fire" is a '70s-inspired, "soaring, synthesizer-driven" house, electropop, and hi-NRG disco song with a nu-disco beat. It was written by Summer along with Sebastian Arocha Morton and Al Kasha, and produced by Morton.

== Critical reception ==
The New York Times' Ben Ratliff praised "I'm a Fire" for "stand[ing] as the beacon of promise" on the album. He commented that "You can lose yourself in this song, and it’s hard not to imagine an entire album like this, done with clearer direction." Thomas Kintner of the Hartford Courant considered the song an essential download from its parent album, Crayons. In his review, Nick Levine of Digital Spy criticized the single for being "aimless, slightly dated", and deemed it "a disappointing reintroduction to the original disco queen".

== Track listing ==
- Album Version - 7:11
- Radio Edit - 3:49
- Original Version - 6:37
- Baggi Begovic & Soul Conspiracy Original Mix - 9:01
- Baggi Begovic & Soul Conspiracy Mixshow - 6:01
- Baggi Begovic & Soul Conspiracy Dub - 10:06
- BBW Red Top Electro Edit - 4:14
- BBW Solitaire Edit - 5:24
- Craig C Burnin Club Mix - 7:46
- Craig C Burnin Mastermix - 11:02
- Craig C Dub - 11:25
- Craig C Mixshow - 6:15
- Craig C's Burnin' Radio Mix - 5:15
- Lost Daze Dub - 9:49
- Lost Daze Remix - 7:48
- Matty Soulflower Acappella - 5:26
- Matty Soulflower Beats - 3:15
- Matty Soulflower Club - 9:10
- Matty Soulflower Dub - 9:29
- ROCAsound Original Album Version - 7:11
- Rod Carrillo Groove Dub - 8:30
- Rod Carrillo Leave It On The Floor Mix - 9:26
- Redtop Burning Extended Mix - 7:15
- Redtop Dub - 7:51
- Seamus Haji Dub - 12:41
- Seamus Haji Mix - 11:09
- Sebastian Arocha Norton's Original Version - 7:22
- Solitaire Club Mix - 7:20
- Solitaire Club Mix W Spanish - 7:11
- Solitaire Dub Mix - 6:57
- Solitaire Radio Edit - 4:11

== Charts ==
Chart (2008)	Peak position
Romania (Romanian Top 100)	76
US Dance Club Songs (Billboard)	1
US Global Dance Songs (Billboard)	32
