= To Paris with Love (song) =

Single by Donna Summer
- Released: August 9, 2010
- Recorded: 2008
- Genre: Pop, dance-pop, Ibiza house
- Label: Driven By The Music/Chalkboard
- Songwriter(s): Bruce Roberts, Donna Summer

Donna Summer singles chronology
"Fame (The Game)" (2009)	"To Paris with Love" (2010)	"Hot Stuff 2018" (2018)

Music video
- "To Paris with Love" on YouTube

"To Paris with Love" is the 89th released single from Donna Summer. It was produced by Peter Stengaard and co-written by Bruce Roberts and Summer. The single was Summer's sixteenth number one on the Billboard Hot Dance Club Play chart, where it reached number one in November 2010.

== Charts ==
=== Weekly charts ===
Chart (2010)	Peak position
US Dance Club Songs (Billboard)	1

=== Year-end charts ===
Chart (2010)	Position
US Dance Club Songs (Billboard)	31

== See also ==
- List of number-one dance singles of 2010 (U.S.)
