= A Mad & Faithful Telling =

Studio album by DeVotchKa
- Released: March 18, 2008
- Recorded: Wavelab, Tucson, AZ; NFA, Denver, CO
- Genres: Indie folk, gypsy punk
- Length: 42:08
- Label: Anti-
- Producers: Craig Schumacher; DeVotchKa

DeVotchKa chronology
Curse Your Little Heart (2006)	A Mad & Faithful Telling (2008)	I Love You Phillip Morris (2009)

A Mad & Faithful Telling is the fifth studio album from the American band DeVotchKa. It was released by Anti- on March 18, 2008. The band's largest tour to date, in support of the album, began on April 26, 2008, at the music festival Coachella.

== Critical reception ==
Professional ratings
Aggregate scores
Source	Rating
Metacritic	78/100
Review scores
Source	Rating
AllMusic	4/5 stars
Robert Christgau	B−
Kevchino	9/10
Music Emissions	4.5/5 stars
Pitchfork	7.7/10
Rolling Stone	3/5 stars
Tiny Mix Tapes	3.5/5 stars

On the review aggregator Metacritic, A Mad & Faithful Telling has a score of 78 out of 100 based on 22 critics' reviews, indicating "generally favorable" reception.

Todd Lavoie of the San Francisco Bay Guardian noted that "A Mad and Faithful Telling throbs and buzzes like a breathless raconteur, its 42 minutes brimming with sentimentality and spectacle", and included the album in his top 10 for 2008. Writing for The Austin Chronicle, Austin Powell said the album "unsheathes a musical realm without boundaries", giving it four out of five stars, whereas Melanie Haupt ranked it ninth on her "National Top 10" list. Joe Tangari of Pitchfork ranked it 12th on his top 25 albums of 2008.

== Track listing ==
All tracks are written by Nick Urata and DeVotchKa.

No.	Title	Length
1.	"Basso Profundo"	5:14
2.	"Along the Way"	4:01
3.	"The Clockwise Witness"	4:37
4.	"Head Honcho"	3:45
5.	"Comrade Z"	2:24
6.	"Transliterator"	4:31
7.	"Blessing in Disguise"	5:49
8.	"Undone"	5:03
9.	"Strizzalo"	1:30
10.	"New World"	5:14
Total length:		42:08

iTunes bonus track
No.	Title	Length
11.	"Undone" (with the Hagerman Quartet)	4:33

== Personnel ==
- DeVotchKa:
  - Vocals, guitar: Nick Urata
  - Sousaphone: Jeanie Schroder
  - Drums: Shawn King
  - Piano: Thomas Hagerman
- Strings:
  - Violin 1: Tom Hagerman
  - Violin 2: Takanori Sugishita
  - Viola: Leah Nelson
  - Cello: Charles Lee
  - Hot guitar: Tom Echols
- Oboe: Kyle Mendenhall
- Trumpets:
  - Jacob Valenzuela
  - Ron Miles
- Additional vocals:
  - Timur Bekbosunov
  - Alexandra Walker

== Charts ==
Chart (2008)	Peak position
UK Independent Albums (Official Charts)	26
US Heatseekers Albums (Billboard)	9
US Independent Albums (Billboard)	29
US Indie Store Album Sales (Billboard)	10
