= Subconscious (album) =

Studio album by Samantha James
- Released: June 22, 2010
- Genre: House; R&B; soul; dance; electronic; chill-out
- Label: Om Records
- Producer: Sebastian Arocha Morton; Shane Drasin

Samantha James chronology
Rise (2007)	Subconscious (2010)

Singles from Subconscious
- 1. "Waves Of Change" Released: March 2, 2010; 2. "Subconscious" Released: August 10, 2010; 3. "Illusions" Released: October 26, 2010

Subconscious is the second studio album from American singer Samantha James under the label Om Records. The album was released on June 22, 2010 with 13 tracks including the first single "Waves of Change" which was produced by Kaskade.

== Background ==
James considers this record a "miracle" after experiencing emotional distress, due to her father's death from cancer, and a bad breakup. She then gained strength from her losses to write a new album, with songs consisting of both negative and positive lyrical content. Thus, the album is titled "Subconscious" because "the songs wrote themselves subconsciously".

Samantha also expressed concern writing new songs because she wanted to satisfy her audience. She then started to work with Sebastian Morton again, but he got occupied by another project, so Samantha got in touch with junior high school friend Shane Drasin to produce the remainder of the album.

== Singles ==
The first single was named "Waves of Change" was released on March 2, 2010. The single reached #12 on the billboard chart Dance/Club, and charted for about eight weeks. The single was produced and the leading track was remixed by Kaskade. The single "Subconscious" was released on iTunes on June 16, 2010. The single was officially released on August 10, 2010.

== Track listing ==
No.	Title	Writer(s)	Producer(s)	Length
1.	"Waves of Change"	Samantha James, Shane Drasin	Shane Drasin	5:13
2.	"Veil"	Samantha James, S. Arocha Morton, Shane Drasin	Shane Drasin	5:54
3.	"Satellites"	Samantha James, Shane Drasin	Shane Drasin	5:19
4.	"Amber Sky"	Samantha James, S. Arocha Morton, Robert Castillo	S. Arocha Morton	3:17
5.	"Subconscious"	Samantha James, Shane Drasin	Shane Drasin	5:53
6.	"Tonight feat. J. B. Eckl"	Samantha James, S. Arocha Morton, Andreas Allen	S. Arocha Morton	4:14
7.	"Life is Waiting"	Samantha James, S. Arocha Morton	S. Arocha Morton	4:11
8.	"Illusions"	Samantha James, S. Arocha Morton, Shane Drasin	Shane Drasin	5:15
9.	"Tree of Life"	Samantha James, S. Arocha Morton,	S. Arocha Morton	4:56
10.	"Free"	Samantha James, S. Arocha Morton	S. Arocha Morton	3:40
11.	"Find a Way"	Samantha James, S. Arocha Morton	S. Arocha Morton	5:26
12.	"Maybe Tomorrow"	Samantha James, Shane Drasin	Shane Drasin	5:24
13.	"Again and Again"	Samantha James, S. Arocha Morton	S. Arocha Morton	3:50
