= Rise (Samantha James album) =

Studio album by Samantha James
- Released: September 25, 2007
- Recorded: 2005–2007
- Genre: House; R&B; soul; nu jazz; electronic
- Length: 56:16 (63:52 w/ bonus track)
- Label: Om Records
- Producer: Sebastian Arocha Morton

Samantha James chronology
Rise (2007)	Subconscious (2010)

Singles from Rise
- 1. "Rise" Released: April 17, 2007; 2. "Deep Surprise" Released: October 16, 2007; 3. "Breathe You In" Released: February 5, 2008; 4. "Angel Love" Released: February 26, 2008

Rise is the debut studio album by American singer Samantha James under the label Om Records. The title track from the album was released as a single, and reached No. 1 on the US Billboard Hot Dance Club Songs chart.

== Background ==
When James established her music style, she began writing songs for Rise together with Sebastian Arocha Morton. James and friend Dave Curtin discussed which label would be good for her music, and came up with Om Records. When they contacted the label and sent them a demo of her song "Rise," she was signed on to a single deal. Shortly after that, they signed on "Angel Love" as well.

After that, she was signed to do a full length album. James said in an interview that her biggest inspiration was her mother, who died when James was 13 years old. The album was a two year process.

== Track listing ==
No.	Title	Writer(s)	Producer(s)	Length
1.	"Rise"	Samantha James, S. Arocha Morton, O. Montes	S. Arocha Morton, Andreas Allen	4:26
2.	"Enchanted Life"	Samantha James, S. Arocha Morton, V. Duplaix	S. Arocha Morton	5:32
3.	"Breathe You In"	Samantha James, S. Arocha Morton, A. Allen, O. Montes	S. Arocha Morton, Andreas Allen	5:21
4.	"Angel Love"	Samantha James, S. Arocha Morton, I. Montes	S. Arocha Morton, Andreas Allen	6:24
5.	"Come Through"	Samantha James, S. Arocha Morton, K. LePage	S. Arocha Morton	4:35
6.	"Living Without You"	Samantha James, S. Arocha Morton, O. Montes	S. Arocha Morton	5:48
7.	"I Found You feat. Celso Fonseca"	Samantha James, Celso Fonseca, S. Arocha Morton	S. Arocha Morton	4:33
8.	"Deep Surprise"	Samantha James, S. Arocha Morton, O. Montes	S. Arocha Morton	4:50
9.	"Send It Out To The Universe"	Samantha James, S. Arocha Morton, O. Montes	S. Arocha Morton	6:20
10.	"Rain"	Samantha James, A. Goldstein, S. Goldstein	S. Arocha Morton	3:57
11.	"Right Now"	Samantha James, S. Arocha Morton	S. Arocha Morton	4:30
12.	"Rise Eric Kupper remix^{1}"	Samantha James, ROCAsound, Olga Montes	S. Arocha Morton	7:36

- ^{1} Japanese bonus track.
