= Rise (Samantha James song) =

Single by Samantha James

from the album Rise
- Released: 2006
- Recorded: 2006
- Genre: House
- Length: 4:26
- Label: Om Records
- Songwriters: Samantha James; Sebastian Arocha Morton; Olga Montes
- Producers: Olga Montes; Sebastian Arocha Morton; Andreas Allen

Samantha James singles chronology
"Rise" (2006)	"Deep Surprise" (2007)

"Rise" is the 2006 debut single by American singer Samantha James. It was written by James, Olga Montes and Sebastian Arocha Morton. The song is from her first full-length album of the same name, which was released in 2007.

The single, in its original soul/electronica form and later remixed in two different releases, was submitted as a demo by her friend Dave Curtin, which led to her signing with Om Records.

The track reached number one on the Billboard Hot Dance Club Play chart, reaching the top spot on April 21, 2007.

== Track listings ==
CD Maxi (US)

- Rise (Eric Kupper Radio Edit) 4:05
- Rise (Eric Kupper Remix) 7:42
- Rise (Groove Junkies Mix) 7:38
- Rise (Ricardo Da Costa & Scotty's 3 Week Mix) 7:58
- Rise (ROCAsound Mix) 5:33
- Rise (Johnny Fiasco's Chunkafunk Mix) 7:33
- Rise (King Kooba's Fidgit & Glitch Mix) 6:54
- Rise (DJ Fluid Main Room Rub) 7:16
- Rise (Original Mix) 4:31
- Rise (Troydon's For The Birds Mix) 6:02
- Rise (Kenneth Thomas Remix) 8:23
