= How It Ends (DeVotchKa album) =

Studio album by DeVotchKa
- Released: October 5, 2004
- Genres: Indie rock, gypsy punk
- Length: 57:01
- Label: Cicero Recordings, Ltd.

DeVotchKa chronology
Una Volta (2003)	How It Ends (2004)	Curse Your Little Heart (2006)

Professional ratings
Review scores
Source	Rating
AllMusic	4.5/5 stars

How It Ends is the fourth album from the band DeVotchKa, released by Cicero Recordings, Ltd. in 2004. The song "How It Ends" reached Number 101 in the UK Singles Chart.

== Usage in media ==
In 2006, the title track was prominently featured in the motion picture 'Little Miss Sunshine'. The band also wrote the score for the film.

In 2008, ‘How It Ends’ was used in the commercial for the Xbox 360 video game Gears of War 2.

In 2025 in episode 2 of the series High Potential.

== Track listing ==
1. "You Love Me" – 4:02
2. "The Enemy Guns" – 4:21
3. "No One Is Watching" – 0:25
4. "Twenty-Six Temptations" – 4:12
5. "How It Ends" – 6:59
6. "Charlotte Mittnacht (The Fabulous Destiny of...)" – 3:06
7. "We're Leaving" – 4:42
8. "Dearly Departed" – 5:12
9. "Such a Lovely Thing" – 4:40
10. "Too Tired" – 4:00
11. "Viens Avec Moi" – 5:01
12. "This Place Is Haunted" – 3:19
13. "Lunnaya Pogonka" – 5:18
14. "Reprise" – 1:45
