= Americano (2005 film) =

- Theatrical poster
- Directed by: Kevin Noland
- Written by: Kevin Noland
- Produced by: Ruthanna Hopper; Clark McCutchen; Kelly J. Noland; Kevin Noland; Maricel Pagulayan; Mark Edward Roberts; Nick Satriano
- Starring: Joshua Jackson; Leonor Varela; Timm Sharp; Ruthanna Hopper; Dennis Hopper
- Music by: Sebastian Arocha Morton; Peter Golub
- Distributed by: MTI Home Video
- Release date: January 7, 2005
- Running time: 95 minutes
- Country: United States
- Language: English

Americano is a 2005 American film. The film stars Joshua Jackson, Leonor Varela, Timm Sharp, Ruthanna Hopper, and Dennis Hopper. It was written and directed by Kevin Noland.

== Plot ==
Chris McKinley (Jackson) is a recent college graduate backpacking through Europe. He is trying to enjoy and gain as much as he can from his last days there before he starts his new career back in the United States. When he reaches Pamplona along with two friends, he meets three new people. He meets an Australian thrill-seeker, a Spaniard named Adella (Varela), and a provocateur (D. Hopper). This new trio encourages McKinley to think about the life and path he has chosen to take and he does so. When the time for him to leave becomes close, he must ponder whether he should take the road to his fast-track career or take a new path into his life.

== Cast ==
- Joshua Jackson as Chris McKinley
- Leonor Varela as Adela
- Timm Sharp as Ryan
- Ruthanna Hopper as Michelle
- Dennis Hopper as Riccardo
- Martin Klebba as Matador

== Critical reviews ==
Los Angeles Times: Writer-director Kevin Noland effectively utilizes his fine young cast and the natural beauty and rich culture of northern Spain in amiably posing a timeless question of youth.

Film Threat: Beautifully shot and filled with lovable characters you could watch for hours, Americano is an amazing journey that makes one yearn for travel.

Reel Film Reviews: Americano certainly succeeds as a romanticized travelogue, and if this doesn't make one want to grab a backpack and head for the hills of Spain, nothing will.

Spokesman-Review: As Jakes Barnes and friends do in "The Sun Also Rises," Noland's characters are in Pamplona to, among other things, run with the bulls. Those other things include falling in/out of love... [and] drinking wine.

TV Guide: Americano is a young man's film, and to Noland's credit it's handsomely shot, well acted and more ambitious than the average first film.

L.A. Weekly: Watching Americano is like hearing a long story about someone else's holiday, and while it seems everyone had a nice time, it's too bad they didn't shoot a better film while they were there.

== Reception ==
As of June 2020, the film holds a 63% approval rating on Rotten Tomatoes, based on eight reviews with an average rating of 6/10.
