= Una Volta =

Studio album by DeVotchKa
- Released: 2003
- Genre: Indie rock, gypsy punk
- Length: 41 minutes
- Label: Cicero Recordings, Ltd.

DeVotchKa chronology
Triple X Tango (2002)	Una Volta (2003)	How It Ends (2004)

Una Volta (Italian for "one time") is the third album from the band DeVotchKa, released by Cicero Recordings, Ltd. in 2003.

== Track listing ==
1. "C'est Ce La" – 1:19
2. "The Oblivion" – 5:00
3. "Death by Blonde" – 3:34
4. "Queen of the Surface Streets" – 5:30
5. "One Last Vow" – 4:56
6. "Vengo! Vengo!" – 4:54
7. "Miette" – 0:41
8. "Ocean of Lust" – 3:35
9. "C'est Ce La, Part II" – 3:40
10. "Commerce City Sister" – 3:47
11. "La Llorona" – 4:51
