= SuperMelodrama =

Studio album by DeVotchKa
- Released: 2000
- Genre: Indie folk, gypsy punk
- Length: 37 minutes
- Label: Dago Records

DeVotchKa chronology
SuperMelodrama (2000)	Triple X Tango (2002)

Professional ratings
Review scores
Source	Rating
AllMusic	4/5 stars

SuperMelodrama is the first album by the band DeVotchKa. It was released by Dago Records in 2000. It was recorded partly at Absinthe Studios, in Westminster, Colorado.

== Critical reception ==
AllMusic wrote that the band mixes "regular references to European folk, hints of sunny pop melodies, and angular post-punk ruminations via a mesh of clarinet, accordion, sousaphone, trumpet, percussion, and violin falling over the staggering peaks of the traditional rock & roll bed of guitar, bass, and drums." Global Rhythm praised the "raucous surf-gypsy leanings."

== Members ==
DeVotchka had a different line up of members for the first album. Only Urata and Hagerman continued.

- Nick Urata – Vocals, guitars, trumpet
- Tom Echols – Cello, guitars, Vocals
- Tom Hagerman – Violin
- David Rastatter – Drums, percussion
- Sweet Johnny V – Bass, accordion
- Young Sam Young – Drums
- Steve Pang – Double Bass
- Michael Crow – Banjo, Jewsharp

== Track listing ==
1. "Danglin' Feet" – 2:24
2. "DeVotchKa!" - 2:58
3. "Gasoline Serpent" – 3:03
4. "Head Honcho" – 3:11
5. "Dark Eyes" – 2:47
6. "Whiskey Breath" – 2:45
7. "Sunrise on Cicero" – 3:14
8. "Cuba Libra" – 2:05
9. "The Jaws of the World" – 2:49
10. "Life Is Short" – 3:28
11. "Tragedy" – 3:31
12. "Curse Your Little Heart" – 2:55
13. "In the Tower" – 2:26
