= DeVotchKa =

American music group

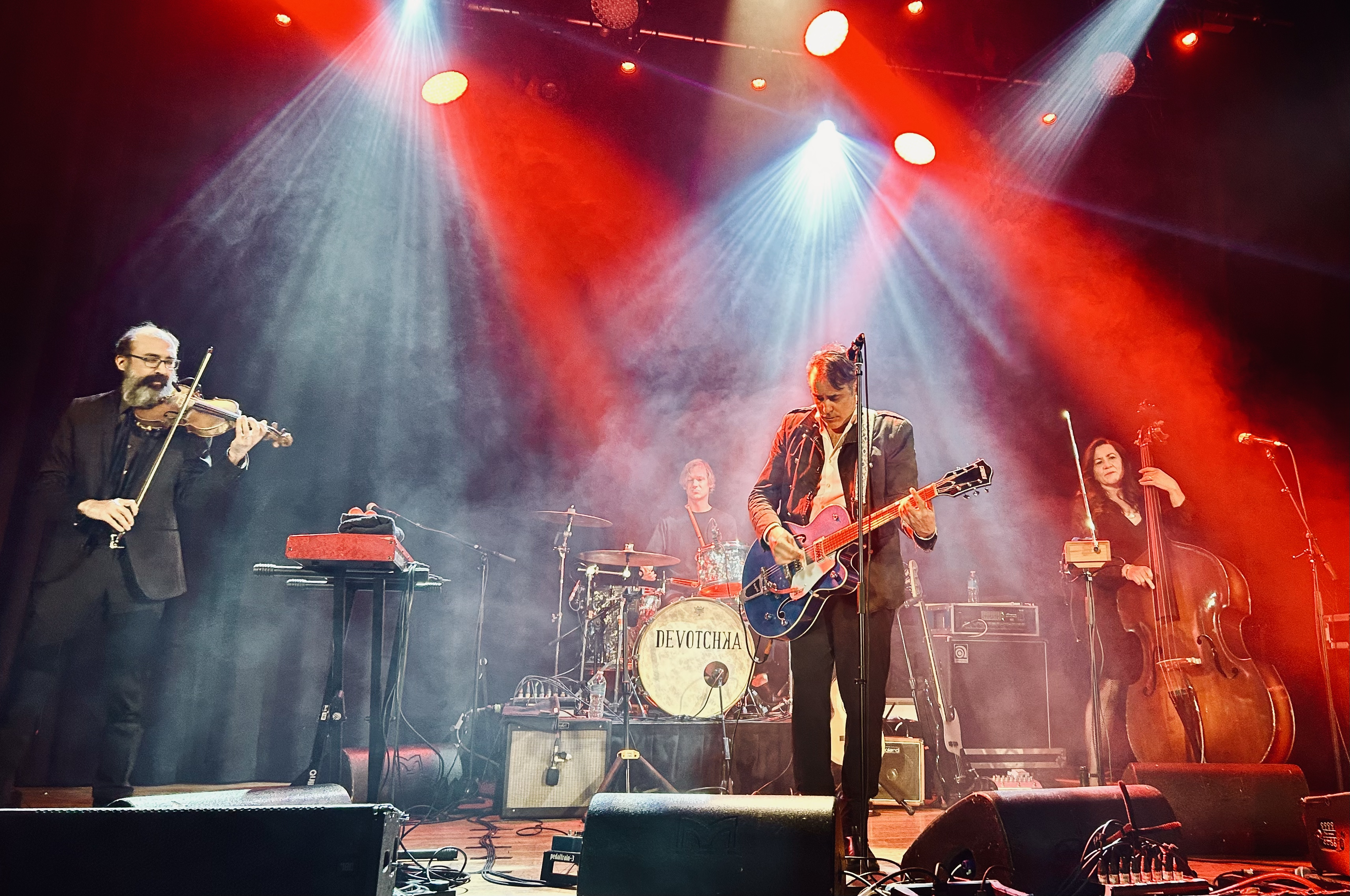
- DeVotchKa performing at Islington Assembly Hall, London in 2025

Background information
- Origin: Denver, Colorado, U.S.
- Genres: Gypsy punk; dark cabaret; indie folk; indie rock; gothic country
- Years active: 1997–present
- Labels: Concord Records, Dago Records, Cicero Recordings, Ace Fu Records, ANTI-
- Members: Nick Urata; Tom Hagerman; Jeanie Schroder; Shawn King
- Website: www.devotchka.net

DeVotchKa is an American multi-instrumental and vocal ensemble formed in Denver, Colorado, in 1997. The band consists of Nick Urata (vocals, guitar, theremin, bouzouki, piano, trumpet), Tom Hagerman (violin, accordion, piano), Jeanie Schroder (sousaphone, double bass, backing vocals, flute) and Shawn King (drums, percussion, trumpet).

The band takes their name from the Russian word devochka (девочка), meaning "girl". After releasing their first four studio albums to critical acclaim and an expanding cult fanbase, the band gained wider attention for providing the score to the 2006 road movie, Little Miss Sunshine, which increased their exposure significantly. Per The New Yorker, "Urata’s unaffected voice, which has a hint of Rocky Mountain loneliness in it, gives the group’s sound roots, whether they’re playing a raucous midway tune or a spaghetti-Western ballad."

To date, the band has released seven studio albums: SuperMelodrama (2000), Triple X Tango (2002), Una Volta (2003), How It Ends (2004), A Mad & Faithful Telling (2008), 100 Lovers (2011) and This Night Falls Forever (2018).

== History ==
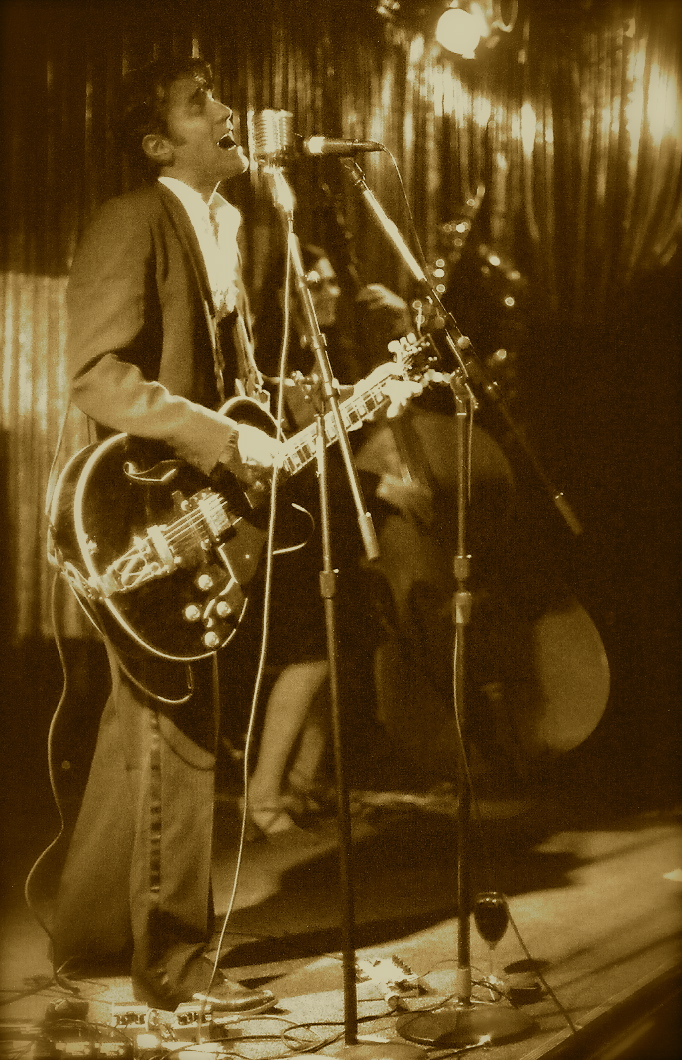
Nick Urata (with Jeanie Schroder)

Originally a backing band for burlesque shows, in their early years DeVotchKa also toured with burlesque performer and model Dita Von Teese. Numerous nationwide tours in support of self-released records earned the band an underground following. Their song "How It Ends", from the 2004 album of the same name, introduced the band to a wider audience after being featured in the trailer for Everything Is Illuminated, in a 2008 Gears of War 2 trailer called "The Last Day", and in an episode of Everwood. "How It Ends" reached Number 101 in the UK Singles Charts. Their performance at the 2006 Bonnaroo music festival was considered a breakout event. In 2006, Arcade Fire singer Win Butler suggested to DeVotchKa that they arrange the Siouxsie and the Banshees song "The Last Beat of My Heart". The musicians found the idea interesting and they recorded that song for 2006's Curse Your Little Heart EP.

In between tours, the band was picked by first time film directors Jonathan Dayton and Valerie Faris to score Little Miss Sunshine, a 2006 film that would go on to garner four Academy Award nominations. DeVotchKa, along with composer Mychael Danna, composed and performed the majority of the music for the film's soundtrack and were nominated for a 2006 Grammy Award for Best Compilation Soundtrack. The main song, "The Winner Is", was also used in a commercial by the French-based environment and energy company Suez and the Dutch pension fund PGGM.

Their 2008 album, A Mad & Faithful Telling, reached No. 9 on the Billboard Heatseekers chart and No. 29 on the Top Independent Albums chart. "New World" and "Head Honcho" were featured in a season 4 episode of the Showtime television show Weeds. In 2008, Boston newspaper The Phoenix named them the Best New Band from Colorado. The band supported Muse at the Stade de France on June 12, 2010, playing to over 80,000 people.

The band's newest album, This Night Falls Forever, was released on August 24, 2018, via Concord Records. On July 13, 2018, DeVotchKa released "Straight Shot", which is the first track on the album.

In 2026, DeVotchKa announced the "Little Miss Sunshine" concert tour, marking the 20th anniversary of the movie's OST.

== Members ==
- Nick Urata – vocals, guitars, piano, trumpet, theremin, bouzouki
- Tom Hagerman – violin, accordion, piano, Melodica
- Jeanie Schroder – sousaphone (currently), upright bass, vocals, flute
- Shawn King – drums, percussion, trumpet, accordion, organ

== Discography ==
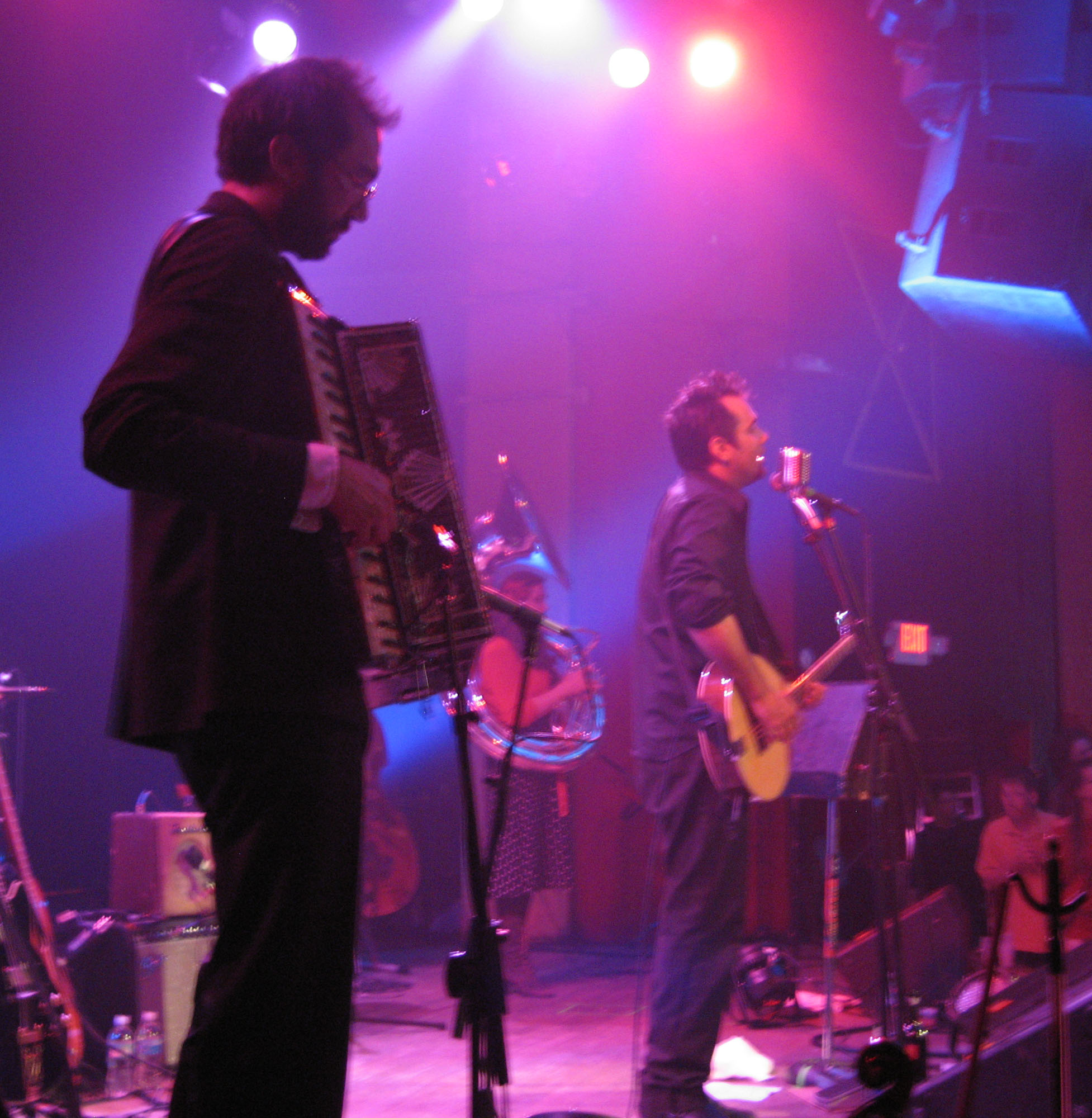
Live in Indianapolis on May 10, 2008

Studio albums

- SuperMelodrama (2000)
- Triple X Tango (2002)
- Una Volta (2003)
- How It Ends (2004)
- A Mad & Faithful Telling (2008) No. 29 Independent Albums Chart/ No. 9 Heatseakers (Billboard U.S.)
- 100 Lovers (2011) No. 74 U.S.
- This Night Falls Forever (2018)

EPs

- Curse Your Little Heart (EP) (2006)

Soundtracks

- Little Miss Sunshine (Original Motion Picture Soundtrack) (2006)
- I Love You, Phillip Morris (Original Motion Picture Soundtrack) (2010)
- The Neverending Story (Original Motion Picture Soundtrack) (2020)

Live albums

- DeVotchKa Live with the Colorado Symphony (2012)

Other album appearances

- Nightmare Revisited - "Overture" (2008)
- Live at KEXP Vol.5 - "How It Ends" (2009)
- Starbuck's Sweetheart - "Hot Burrito No. 1" (2009)
- Songs from the Point! (Harry Nilsson cover album) - "Everything's Got 'Em" (2009)
- Minnesota Beatle Project Volume 4 - "Girl" (2011; Vega Productions. CD and LP.)
- "Man in a Shoe" - DirecTV ad using "The Winner Is", NBC, (2013)
