= Little Miss Sunshine =

2006 American dark tragicomedy road film

- Theatrical release poster
- Directed by: Jonathan Dayton; Valerie Faris
- Written by: Michael Arndt
- Produced by: Marc Turtletaub; David T. Friendly; Peter Saraf; Albert Berger; Ron Yerxa
- Starring: Greg Kinnear; Steve Carell; Toni Collette; Paul Dano; Abigail Breslin; Alan Arkin
- Cinematography: Tim Suhrstedt
- Edited by: Pamela Martin
- Music by: Mychael Danna
- Production companies: Big Beach Films; Bona Fide Productions; Third Gear Productions
- Distributed by: Fox Searchlight Pictures
- Release dates: January 20, 2006 (Sundance); July 26, 2006 (United States)
- Running time: 102 minutes
- Country: United States
- Language: English
- Budget: $8 million
- Box office: $101.1 million

Little Miss Sunshine is a 2006 American tragicomedy film directed by Jonathan Dayton and Valerie Faris (in their directorial debut) from a screenplay written by Michael Arndt. The film stars an ensemble cast consisting of Greg Kinnear, Steve Carell, Toni Collette, Paul Dano, Abigail Breslin, and Alan Arkin, all of whom play members of a dysfunctional family taking the youngest (Breslin) to compete in a child beauty pageant. Breslin's breakout performance in the film earned her an Academy Award nomination. The road film tackles themes of family, depression, self-acceptance, and finding meaning in absurd conditions. It was produced by Big Beach Films on a budget of US$8 million. Filming began on June 6, 2005, and took place over 30 days in Arizona and Southern California.

The film premiered at the Sundance Film Festival on January 20, 2006, and its distribution rights were bought by Fox Searchlight Pictures for one of the biggest deals made in the history of the festival. The film had a limited release in the United States on July 26, 2006, and expanded to a wider release starting on August 18.

Little Miss Sunshine was a box office success, grossing $101 million. It garnered critical praise for its performances, as well as for its directing, screenplay and humor. It earned four nominations at the 79th Academy Awards, including Best Picture. Arndt and Arkin won Best Original Screenplay and Best Supporting Actor, respectively, and Breslin was nominated for Best Supporting Actress. It also won the Independent Spirit Award for Best Feature and the Screen Actors Guild Award for Outstanding Performance by a Cast in a Motion Picture, it won the Producers Guild of America Award for Best Theatrical Motion Picture and received numerous other accolades.

== Plot ==
Sheryl Hoover is a stressed mother of two living in Albuquerque, New Mexico. Her husband Richard is an aspiring motivational speaker and life coach. Dwayne, Sheryl's Nietzsche-admiring teenage son from her previous marriage, has taken a vow of silence until he accomplishes his dream of becoming a fighter pilot. Sheryl's older brother Frank Ginsburg, a gay scholar of Proust, is living with the family after attempting suicide. Richard's foul-mouthed father Edwin is also living with the family after being evicted from a retirement home for snorting heroin. Olive, Richard and Sheryl's 7-year-old daughter, is an aspiring beauty queen coached by Edwin.

Olive learns she has qualified for the "Little Miss Sunshine" beauty pageant being held in Redondo Beach, California, in two days. Richard, Sheryl, and Edwin want to support her, and Frank and Dwayne cannot be left alone, so the whole family attends. Due to financial constraints, they go on an 800-mile (1,300 km) road trip in their yellow Volkswagen van. Family tensions play out along the way, amidst the aging van's mechanical problems. When the van's clutch breaks early on, the only way to drive it is to push it fast enough for the driver to put it into third gear, then jump in the open side door. Later, the van's horn starts honking by itself, and at one point the side door falls off.

Throughout the trip, the family suffer numerous personal setbacks and discover their need for each other's support. While buying pornography for Edwin at a gas station, Frank embarrassingly meets the ex-boyfriend who, in leaving him for an academic rival, had prompted his suicide attempt. Richard loses an important contract with businessman Stan Grossman that would have jump-started his motivational business. Edwin snorts heroin in his room, leading to a fatal overdose. When the hospital staff refuse to let the family leave his corpse behind while they go to the pageant, they smuggle it out the window and into the van's trunk. They are almost caught when a police officer pulls them over because of the honking horn, only escaping due to the police officer's fascination with the pornography.

During the final leg of the trip, Dwayne discovers he is color blind, meaning he cannot become a pilot. This revelation prompts him to finally break his silence and shout his disdain for his family, though he apologizes after Olive calms him with a gentle hug.

After a frantic race against the clock, the family arrives at the pageant hotel. Sheryl prepares Olive for her performance while Richard makes arrangements for Edwin's body. The other contestants are slim, sexualized pre-teens who perform elaborate dance numbers with great panache. Fearing that the amateur Olive will be humiliated, Richard and Dwayne try to stop her from performing, but Sheryl insists that they "let Olive be Olive", and she goes on stage.

The hitherto-unseen dance routine Edwin had taught Olive is revealed to be a striptease performed to the Rocasound remix of Rick James' "Super Freak". Olive is oblivious to the subtext of the routine, but it horrifies and angers most of the audience, and the pageant organizer demands she be removed from the stage. Richard physically prevents this, and the family all join Olive on stage, dancing alongside her to show their support.

The family is later released from the hotel's security office on the condition that Olive never enter a beauty pageant in California again. Piling into the van with the horn still honking, they begin their trip home to Albuquerque.

== Cast ==
- Greg Kinnear as Richard Hoover
- Toni Collette as Sheryl Hoover (née Ginsburg)
- Steve Carell as Frank Ginsburg
- Paul Dano as Dwayne Hoover
- Abigail Breslin as Olive Hoover
- Alan Arkin as Grandpa Edwin Hoover
- Bryan Cranston as Stan Grossman
- Beth Grant as Pageant Official Jenkins
- Wallace Langham as Kirby
- Matt Winston as Pageant MC
- Julio Oscar Mechoso as Mechanic
- Paula Newsome as Linda
- Dean Norris as State Trooper McCleary
- Mary Lynn Rajskub as Pageant Assistant Pam
- Mel Rodriguez as Officer Martinez

== Production ==
=== Casting ===
You start off with all these people living their separate lives and the climax of the movie is them all jumping up onstage together. So the story is really about these families starting separately and ending together.

— Michael Arndt, writer

When choosing the cast for the film, directors Jonathan Dayton and Valerie Faris were assisted by casting directors Kim Davis and Justine Baddeley who had worked with them on previous music videos. Davis and Baddeley traveled to "every English-speaking country" to search for the actress to portray Olive Hoover, and they finally chose actress Abigail Breslin through an audition when she was six. Paul Dano was cast as Dwayne two years before production began and in preparation for portraying his character, spent a few days taking his own vow of silence.

The role of Frank, the suicidal Proust scholar, was originally written for Bill Murray, and there was also studio pressure for Robin Williams. The directing duo chose Steve Carell for the role a few months before filming began, and in an interview revealed, "When we met with Steve Carell, we didn't know he could do this based upon what he had done. But when we met with him and talked to him about the character, the tone of the movie and the way we were approaching it, he was right on the same page with us." Although known to Comedy Central viewers for many years as a correspondent on the satirical news program The Daily Show with Jon Stewart, at the time Carell was cast he was relatively unknown in Hollywood, and producers of the film were worried that he was not a big enough star and did not have much acting experience.

=== Script and development ===
The script was written by Michael Arndt and was originally about an East Coast road trip from Maryland to Florida, but was shifted to a journey from New Mexico to California because of budget issues. Arndt started the script on May 23, 2000, and completed the first rough draft by May 26. He had initially planned on shooting the film himself by raising several thousand dollars and using a camcorder. Instead, he gave the screenplay to producers Ron Yerxa and Albert Berger who teamed up with Deep River Productions to find a potential director. Arndt included the character Stan Grossman (here played by Bryan Cranston) as a tribute to the film Fargo.

The producers met directors Dayton and Faris while producing Election and in turn gave the script to them to read in 2001. The directors commented later on the script stating: "This film really struck a chord. We felt like it was written for us." The script was purchased from first-time screenwriter Arndt for $250,000 by Marc Turtletaub, one of the film's producers, on December 21, 2001. Yerxa and Berger remained as producers as they were responsible for finding the directors and cinematographer, assisting in the ending re-shoot, and helping bring the film to the Sundance Film Festival.

The film was pitched to several studios, and the only interested studio was Focus Features, who wanted to film it in Canada. After the studio attempted to have the film be centered on the character Richard Hoover, and Arndt disagreed, he was fired and replaced by another writer. The new writer added several scenes, including Richard's confrontation with the character who dismisses his motivational technique business. A corporate change brought in a new studio head and Arndt was rehired when the new writer left after four weeks of rewriting the script. After two years of pre-production, Focus Features dropped the film in August 2004. Marc Turtletaub paid $400,000 to Focus Features to buy back the rights to the film and for development costs. He also paid for the $8 million budget, allowing Little Miss Sunshine to then be filmed.

=== Filming ===
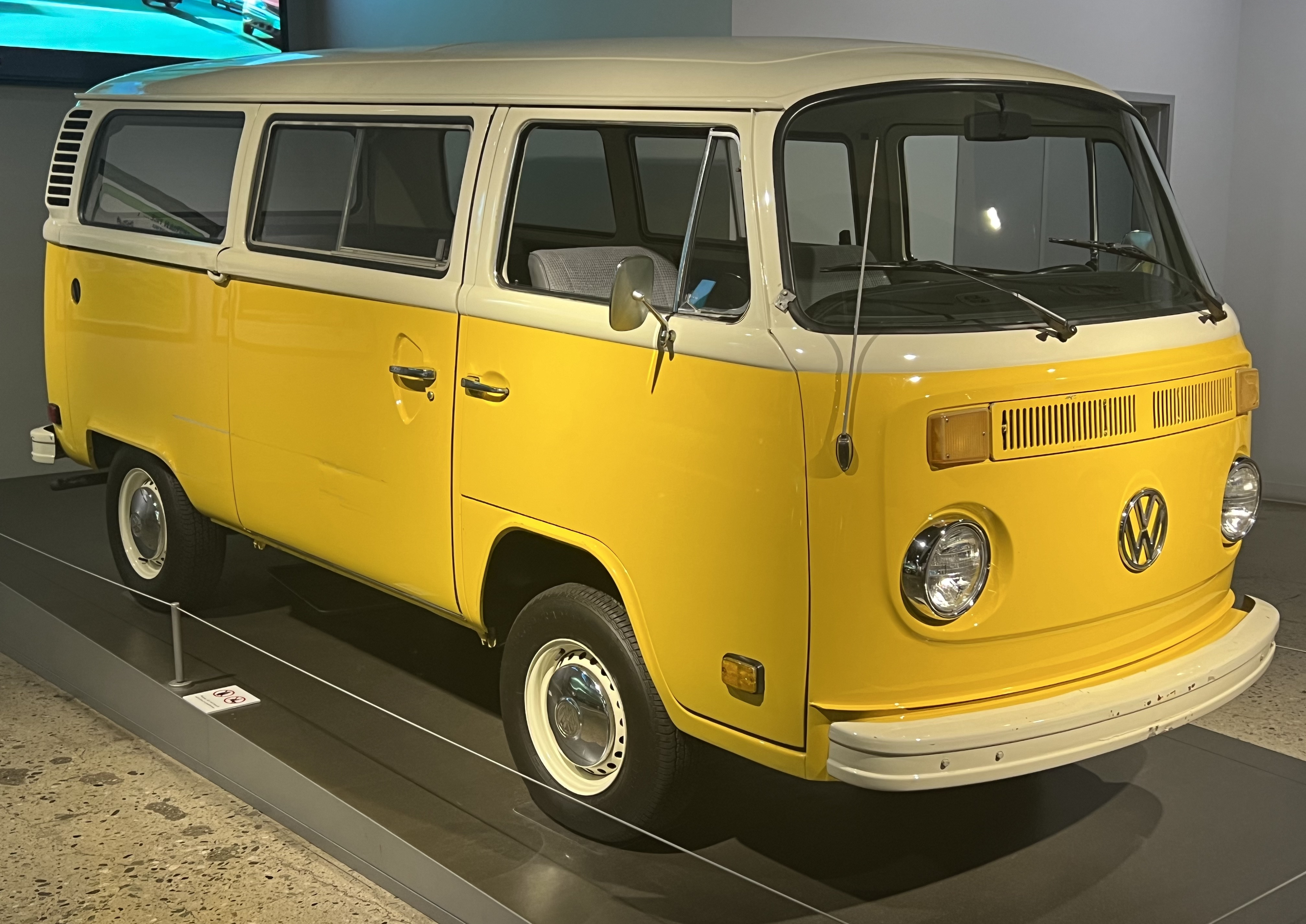
The 1979 Volkswagen Type 2 used in the movie, at the Petersen Automotive Museum in Los Angeles

Principal photography began on June 6, 2005. Filming took place over 30 days in Arizona and southern California, with scenes shot in keeping with the chronological order of the script. Arndt re-wrote the ending to the film six weeks before the film's premiere at the Sundance Film Festival, and this was filmed that December during the post-production of Little Miss Sunshine in 2005. The film was dedicated to Rebecca Annitto, the niece of producer Peter Saraf and an extra in scenes set in the diner and the convenience store, who was killed in a car accident on September 14, 2005.

==== Volkswagen T2 Microbus ====
Five modified vans were used during filming to capture various angles of the characters, including this one through the windshield.

When writing the script, Arndt chose the Volkswagen T2 Microbus to use for the road trip based on his experience with the vehicle and its practicality for filming: "I remember thinking, it's a road trip, what vehicle are you going to put them in? And [the] VW bus just seems logical, just because you have these high ceilings and these clean sight lines where you can put the camera. In the front windshield looking back and seeing everybody." Five VW Microbuses were used for the family car as some were modified for different filming techniques. Three of the vans had engines, and the two without were mounted on trailers. During pre-production, the cinematographer used a basic video camera and set it up at angles inside the van to determine the best locations to shoot from during filming. Many of the problems associated with the van that were included in the plot (a broken clutch, a stuck horn, and a detached door), were based on similar problems that writer Arndt experienced during a childhood trip that involved the same type of vehicle.

In an interview, actor Greg Kinnear jokingly described how the scenes were filmed when he was driving: "I was going like 50 miles an hour [80 km/h] in this '71 VW van that doesn't have side airbags. Basically, you'd wait for this huge camera truck to come whizzing in front of us with the camera. 'Okay, go!' I mean, it was insanity; it's the most dangerous movie I've ever made." While filming the scenes in the van, the actors would at times remain in the vehicle for three or four hours a day. For scenes in which Alan Arkin's character was swearing excessively, Breslin had her headphones on and could not hear the dialogue, just like her character in the film. Only when she saw the film did she know what was being said. On July 25, 2006, Fox Searchlight Pictures invited VW bus owners to a screening at Vineland Drive-In theater in Industry, California. Over 60 of the vans were present at the screening.

==== Pageant ====
To make Abigail Breslin's character (center) appear larger than the other girls, she wore a padded suit. Much of the equipment and costumes exhibited during the pageant were provided by actual contestants' parents.

Prior to writing the script, Arndt read in a newspaper about Arnold Schwarzenegger speaking to a group of high school students and saying "If there's one thing in this world I hate, it's losers. I despise them." As a result, Arndt developed his script lampooning the thought process: "And I thought there's something so wrong with that attitude ... I wanted to ... attack that idea that in life you're going up or you're going down ... So to a degree, a child beauty pageant is the epitome of the ultimate stupid meaningless competition people put themselves through." Co-director Jonathan Dayton also commented on the importance of the pageant to the film: "As far as the pageant goes, it was very important to us that the film not be about pageants. It's about being out of place, it's about not knowing where you're going to end up ..." All the girls acting as participants in the beauty pageant, except Abigail Breslin, were veterans of real beauty pageants. They looked the same and performed the same acts as they had in their real-life pageants. To prepare for filming, the directors attended several pageants in Southern California and met with a coordinator to learn more about the pageant process. A mother of a contestant in the film claimed that the film overplayed practices that the contestants go through: "Most pageants aren't quite like that, with shaving the girls' legs, spraying them with fake tans and putting on so much makeup."

When Focus Features initially wanted to film in Canada, the directors opposed it, believing the costs of flying all of the pageant girls and their families would be excessive. The contestants and their families instead spent two weeks filming in a hotel in Ventura with most of the equipment and costumes being provided by the contestants' parents. To make Breslin's character the "plump" figure as shown in the film, she had to wear a padded suit during filming. For Olive's final scene involving her dancing routine, Breslin spent two weeks preparing with a choreographer.

== Music ==
"It was very important for us to find the right sound for this movie. We hoped that we could find it before we actually filmed the picture because that's how we worked for years and we've found that music informs our choices."

— Jonathan Dayton, director

=== Score ===
The score for Little Miss Sunshine was written by the Denver band DeVotchKa and composer Mychael Danna. It was recorded and mixed by Brad Haehnel at Paramount Recording Studios in Los Angeles. Performed by DeVotchKa, much of the music was adapted from their pre-existing songs, such as "How It Ends", which became "The Winner Is", "The Enemy Guns" and "You Love Me" from the album How It Ends, and "La Llorona" from Una Volta.

Directors Dayton and Faris were introduced to DeVotchKa's music after hearing the song "You Love Me" on Los Angeles' KCRW radio station. The directors were so impressed with the music that they purchased iPods for cast members containing DeVotchKa albums. Mychael Danna was brought in to help arrange the pre-existing material and collaborate with DeVotchKa on new material for the film. The Little Miss Sunshine score was not eligible for Academy Award consideration due to the percentage of material derived from already written DeVotchKa songs. The DeVotchka song "Til the End of Time" received a nomination for a 2006 Satellite Award as "Best Original Song". Both DeVotchKa and Danna received 2007 Grammy nominations for their work on the soundtrack.

=== Soundtrack ===
Little Miss Sunshine (Original Motion Picture Soundtrack)

Soundtrack album by Various Artists
- Released: July 11, 2006
- Recorded: 2005
- Genre: Soundtrack
- Length: 46:31
- Label: Lakeshore Records
- Producer: Various Artists

Professional ratings
Review scores
Source	Rating
Allmusic	4/5 stars
Entertainment Weekly	(A−)
Empire	4/5 stars
SoundtrackNet	3.5/5 stars

The soundtrack reached No. 42 on the "Top Independent Albums" list and No. 24 on "Top Soundtracks" in the U.S. for 2006. It contains two songs by Sufjan Stevens ("No Man's Land" and "Chicago"), and songs by Tony Tisdale ("Catwalkin'") and Rick James ("Super Freak"). Two additional songs in the film that were written by Gordon Pogoda—"Let It Go" and "You've Got Me Dancing" (the latter of which he co-wrote with Barry Upton)—are featured during the pageant scenes near the end of the film. "Super Freak", the source music danced to by Olive during the pageant competition, was introduced during post-production by a suggestion from the music supervisor. Arndt's screenplay had called for Prince's song "Peach"; during filming, the ZZ Top song "Gimme All Your Lovin'" was used. For the film, "Super Freak" was remixed by record producer Sebastian Arocha Morton (known professionally as ROCAsound).

==== Track listing ====
No.	Title	Writer(s)	Length
1.	"The Winner Is"	DeVotchKa	3:04
2.	"Til the End of Time"	DeVotchKa	3:56
3.	"You Love Me"	DeVotchKa	4:02
4.	"First Push"	DeVotchKa	1:05
5.	"No Man's Land"	Sufjan Stevens	4:47
6.	"Let's Go"	DeVotchKa	3:21
7.	"No One Gets Left Behind"	DeVotchKa	1:14
8.	"Chicago"	Sufjan Stevens	6:07
9.	"We're Gonna Make It"	DeVotchKa	2:32
10.	"Do You Think There's a Heaven"	DeVotchKa	1:23
11.	"Catwalkin'"	Tony Tisdale	1:38
12.	"Super Freak (Rocasound Revamp)"	Rick James	4:13
13.	"La Llorona"	DeVotchKa	3:24
14.	"How It Ends"	DeVotchKa	5:39
Total length:			46:31

== Release ==
=== Sundance Film Festival ===
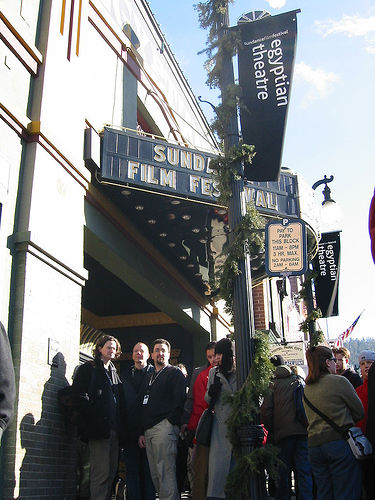
The film debuted at the Sundance Film Festival in Utah

Little Miss Sunshine premiered at the Sundance Film Festival on January 20, 2006. An hour after its first screening began, sales agent John Sloss of Cinetic Media also arranged screenings for studio heads at New Line Cinema and Paramount Pictures. Multiple studios showed immense interest in the film following its premiere: Focus Features (where the film had once been in development), Paramount Classics, the Weinstein Company, Miramax Films, Summit Entertainment, and Warner Independent Pictures were among those that bid for distribution rights. Minutes after the first screening ended, 20th Century Fox chairman Tom Rothman informed producer David T. Friendly via telephone that, despite Rothman not having seen the film yet, he and Fox Searchlight Pictures head Peter Rice were very eager to acquire it. By sunrise on January 21, after hours of intense bargaining overnight, Fox Searchlight had acquired worldwide rights to the film, offering $10.5 million, plus 10% of all the gross revenues. The deal occurred less than a day after the premiere and was one of the biggest deals made in the history of the festival; the previous year's festival had the film Hustle & Flow receive $9 million from Paramount Classics, and in 1999, Happy, Texas received $10.25 million from Miramax Films.

=== Box office ===
Little Miss Sunshine initially opened in seven theaters in the U.S. in its first week, earning $498,796. On July 29, 2006, the first Saturday after its initial limited release, Little Miss Sunshine earned a $20,335 per-theater average gross. It had the highest per-theater average gross of all the films shown in the United States every day for the first 21 days of its release, until being surpassed by the IMAX film Deep Sea 3D on August 15. In its third week of release Little Miss Sunshine entered the list of top ten highest grossing American films for the week. It remained in the top ten until the 11th week of release, when it dropped to 11th place. The highest position it reached was third, which occurred in its fifth week of release. The largest number of theaters the film appeared in was 1,602. Internationally, the film earned over $5 million in Australia, $3 million in Germany, $4 million in Spain, and $6 million combined in the United Kingdom, Ireland, and Malta. Little Miss Sunshine has had gross receipts of $59,891,098 in North America and $40,632,083 internationally for a total of $100,523,181.

=== Home media ===
The DVD was released on December 19, 2006. It includes a dual-disc widescreen/full screen format, two commentary tracks, four alternate endings, and a music video by DeVotchKa. In its first week of release, DVD sales totaled $19,614,299 and it was the sixth-most sold DVD of the week. By September 16, 2008, gross domestic DVD sales totaled $55,516,832. Rentals of the film from its release through April 15, 2007, totalled $46.32 million. The film was released on Blu-ray on February 10, 2009. Then in 2010, it was released on a double movie DVD pack with Juno.

== Reception ==
=== Critical response ===
On Rotten Tomatoes, Little Miss Sunshine received a 91% positive aggregate rating, based on 218 reviews, with an average rating of 7.8/10. The site's critical consensus reads, "Little Miss Sunshine succeeds thanks to a strong ensemble cast that includes Greg Kinnear, Steve Carell, Toni Collette, Alan Arkin, and Abigail Breslin, as well as a delightfully funny script." On Metacritic, the film holds a score of 80 out of 100, based on reviews from 36 critics, indicating "generally favorable" reviews.

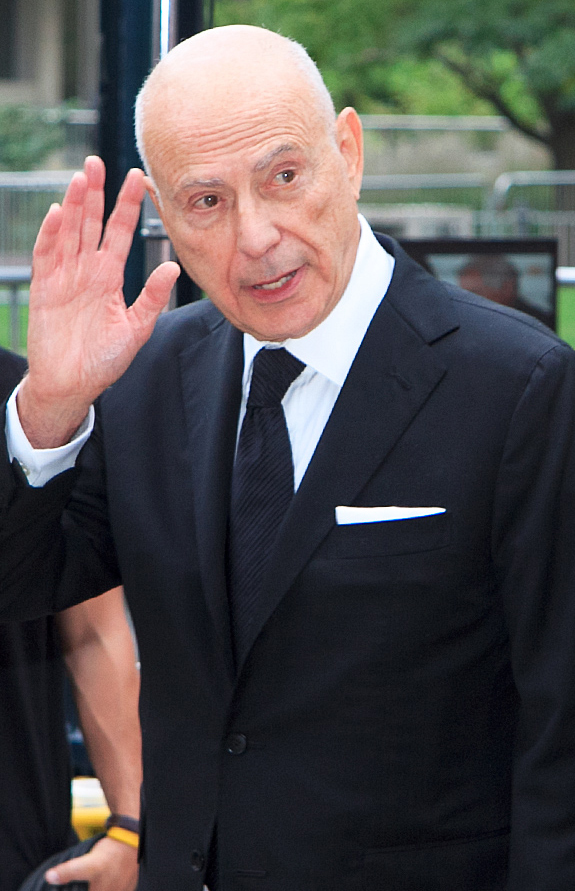
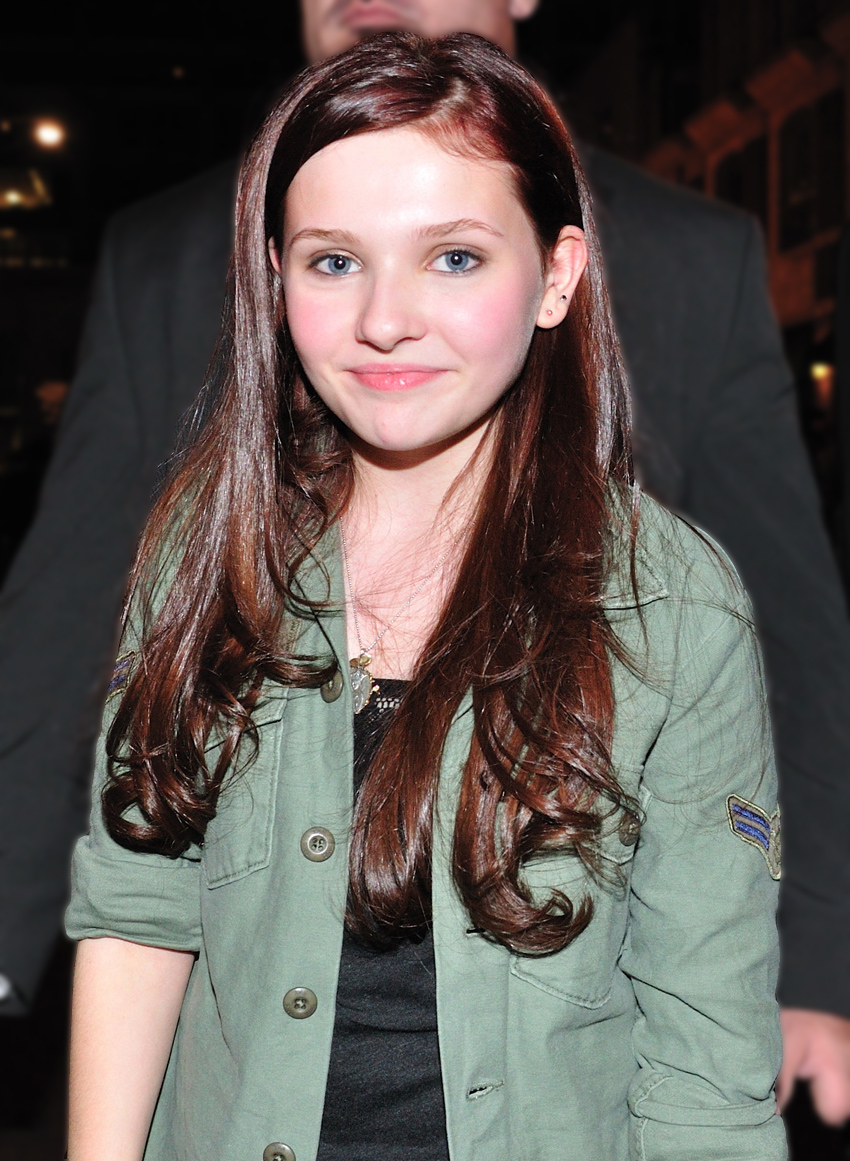
The performances of Alan Arkin and Abigail Breslin received widespread critical acclaim, earning them Academy Award nominations for Best Supporting Actor and Best Supporting Actress respectively, with Arkin winning his category.

Michael Medved gave Little Miss Sunshine four out of four, saying that "... this startling and irresistible dark comedy counts as one of the very best films of the year ..." and that directors Jonathan Dayton and Valerie Faris, the movie itself, and actors Alan Arkin, Abigail Breslin, and Steve Carell deserved Oscar nominations. Joel Siegel issued an 'A' rating, saying that "Orson Welles would have to come back to life for this not to make my year-end Top 10 list." Stella Papamichael of BBC News called the film "a winning blend of sophistication and silliness". USA Today's Claudia Puig commented on Breslin's depiction of Olive Hoover, "If Olive had been played by any other little girl, she would not have affected us as mightily as it did."

Owen Gleiberman of Entertainment Weekly labeled the film with a 'C' rating, calling the characters "walking, talking catalogs of screenwriter index-card data". Jim Ridley of The Village Voice called the movie a "rickety vehicle that travels mostly downhill" and a "Sundance clunker". Liam Lacey of The Globe and Mail criticized the film, stating "Though Little Miss Sunshine is consistently contrived in its characters' too-cute misery, the conclusion, which is genuinely outrageous and uplifting, is almost worth the hype." Anna Nimouse of National Review wrote that the film "is praised as a 'feel-good' film, perhaps for moviegoers who like bamboo under their fingernails. If you are miserable, then Little Miss Sunshine is the film for you". Paste Magazine named it one of the 50 Best Movies of the Decade (2000–2009), ranking it at No. 34. In 2025, it ranked number 63 on The New York Times' list of "The 100 Best Movies of the 21st Century" and number 42 on the "Readers' Choice" edition of the list.

Roger Ebert reflected on the film's themes, writing "Little Miss Sunshine shows us a world in which there's a form, a brochure, a procedure, a job title, a diet, a step-by-step program, a career path, a prize, a retirement community, to quantify, sort, categorize and process every human emotion or desire. Nothing exists that cannot be compartmentalized or turned into a self-improvement mantra about 'winners and losers.'" Brian Tallerico of UGO.com also focused on the film's themes: "Little Miss Sunshine teaches us to embrace that middle ground, acknowledging that life may just be a beauty pageant, where we're often going to be outdone by someone prettier, smarter, or just plain luckier, but if we get up on that stage and be ourselves, everything will turn out fine."

=== Accolades ===
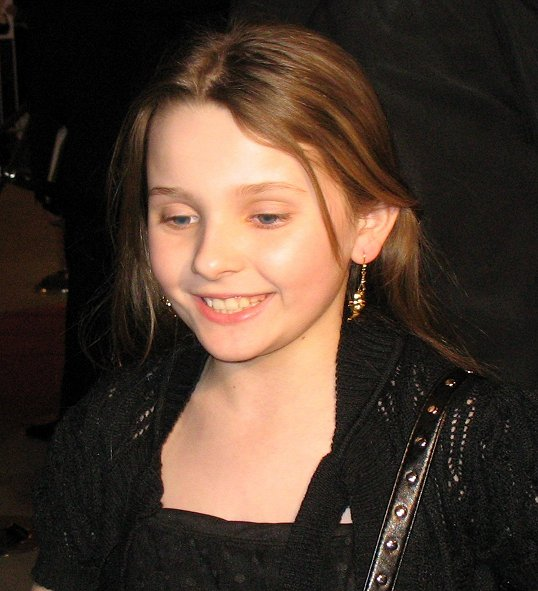
Abigail Breslin promoting the film at the Palm Springs International Film Festival in January 2007

Little Miss Sunshine was nominated for and won multiple awards from numerous film organizations and festivals. It was nominated for four Academy Awards and was awarded two at the 79th Academy Awards: Michael Arndt received "Best Original Screenplay" and Alan Arkin received "Best Supporting Actor". In addition, the AFI Awards deemed it the "Movie of the Year", while the BAFTA Awards awarded it two awards out of six nominations with "Best Screenplay" for Arndt and "Best Actor in a Supporting Role" for Arkin. The Broadcast Film Critics Association Awards, Screen Actors Guild (SAG), and Washington D.C. Area Film Critics commended the film for its ensemble cast. Then 10-year-old Abigail Breslin was nominated for several Best Supporting Actress and Breakthrough Performance awards.

The Deauville Film Festival awarded the film the "Grand Special Prize" while the Palm Springs International Film Festival awarded it the "Chairman's Vanguard Award". The Independent Spirit Awards awarded it four awards out of five nominations, including "Best Feature" and "Best Director". The film's soundtrack was nominated for "Best Compilation Soundtrack Album for Motion Picture, Television, or Other Visual Media" at the Grammy Awards, but lost to Walk the Line. The film also had multiple nominations at the MTV Movie Awards, Satellite Awards, Chicago Film Critics Association Awards, and Golden Globe Awards, among others. In 2021, members of Writers Guild of America West (WGAW) and Writers Guild of America, East (WGAE) ranked its screenplay 21st in WGA's 101 Greatest Screenplays of the 21st Century (so far).

==== Number of producers controversy in Academy Awards ====
There was some controversy concerning how many producers should receive an award from the Academy of Motion Picture Arts and Sciences for their work in producing the film. In 1999, the academy decided that up to a maximum of three producers are eligible to be included in an award for a film. The rule was implemented to prevent numerous involved filmmakers to appear on stage when a film was receiving an award. The Producers Guild of America (PGA) has not set a limit of producers that can be honored for a film. In the case of Little Miss Sunshine, there were five producers (Marc Turtletaub, Peter Saraf, Albert Berger, Ron Yerxa, and David Friendly) and the academy did not want to include Berger and Yerxa. The two producers were responsible for finding the script, introducing the directors to the other producers, choosing the cinematographer, assisting in the re-shoot of the ending, and helping bring the film to the Sundance Film Festival. The academy acknowledged that the two were partners in the production process, but declared that only individual producers are recognized by the academy. Deeming the two producers' work as a collective effort, the academy refused to consider either Berger or Yerxa for the award. Producer David Hoberman commented on the support for honoring all five producers, stating "If there are five people actually involved in producing a movie, there's no reason why someone who's made a good enough film to be nominated for an Academy Award should be precluded from being rewarded for the work they did." Film producer and author Lynda Obst who was affiliated with an Academy Award producer committee, also commented: "By and large, five people don't make a movie. If this is an exception, then it's a sad situation. But you don't destroy a rule for an exception."

The PGA had previously honored all five of the producers. Albert Berger, reacting to the academy's decision while at a panel for the film, stated "No matter what the Academy decided, we produced this movie." In June 2007, the academy announced that they would allow exceptions for films that had more than three producers in the future, stating, "The committee has the right, in what it determines to be a rare and extraordinary circumstance, to name any additional qualified producer as a nominee."

== Stage musical adaptation ==
A musical based on the film, with music and lyrics by William Finn and book and direction by James Lapine, was workshopped at the Sundance Institute Theatre Lab at White Oak in Yulee, Florida October 25 through November 7, 2009. It then premiered at the La Jolla Playhouse from February 15 through March 27, 2011. The cast features Hunter Foster, Malcolm Gets, Georgi James, Dick Latessa, Jennifer Laura Thompson, and Taylor Trensch.

On March 11, 2011, Gets left the show. Ensemble member Andrew Samonsky took over the role of Uncle Frank, and understudy Ryan Wagner took over the role of Joshua Rose until the show closed on March 27, 2011. The musical premiered at Second Stage Theatre on October 15, 2013 (previews), and officially on November 14, 2013. The production closed on December 15, 2013. The cast features Hannah Rose Nordberg as Olive Hoover, Stephanie J. Block as Sheryl Hoover, Rory O'Malley as Frank Ginsberg, Wesley Taylor as Joshua Rose, Josh Lamon as Buddy, David Rasche as Grandpa Hoover, Jennifer Sanchez as Miss California and Logan Rowland as Dwayne Hoover.
