= Samantha James =

American singer

- Origin: Los Angeles, California
- Genres: House; R&B; soul; electronic; downtempo; chill-out
- Occupation: Singer/songwriter
- Years active: 2007–present
- Label: Om Records
- Website: https://omrecords.squarespace.com/samantha-james

Samantha James is an American dance pop singer from Los Angeles, known for her style of blending downtempo to uptempo dance music, with soulful vocal styles. She released her debut album, Rise, in 2007 through Om Records. The title track from the album was released as a single the year prior, and reached No. 1 on the US Billboard Hot Dance Club Songs chart.

== Life and career ==
The daughter of Melanie Lee Rose, and granddaughter of musician David Rose, James grew up with different types of music. During her teens, she became heavily involved in the underground dance scene in Los Angeles. Her influences include Pat Metheny, Sade, Tracey Thorn, Lady Miss Kier, Madonna, Esthero, Morcheeba, Bebel Gilberto, Basia, and Róisín Murphy.

At the age of 13, James lost her mother to breast cancer, after an eight-year battle with the disease. After eight years of working on her music, she met Sebastian Arocha Morton, who worked with artists such as Sting, Vikter Duplaix, and Fischerspooner. When she met Morton, James was determined to be different from other artists. After a while, James and Morton came up with a mix of soulful and electronic music and continued on that path.

James and friend Dave Curtin discussed which label would be good for her music and came up with Om Records. When they contacted the label and sent them a demo of her song "Rise", she was signed on to a single deal. After a while, she was signed to do a full-length album. When she released her first single "Rise" in 2006, it reached No. 1 on the Billboard Hot Dance Club Songs chart. Shortly after releasing her debut album, she toured around the world.

In 2009, James announced that she was working on a new album named Subconscious. James later stated that just before Rise was released, her father died and she took some time off before producing material for the new album. On the new album she worked with producer (and old school friend) Shane Drasin since Morton was busy working on other projects. On June 22, 2010, James released the album.

James released the song "Wings of Faith", dedicated to Japan, due to the tsunami in March 2011.

On February 13, 2026, James released her first new music in 16 years with singles "Summer Haze" (a collaboration with Late Night Alumni) and "Closer" from the forthcoming compilation album celebrating the 30th anniversary of OM Records.

== Discography ==
- Rise (2007)
- Subconscious (2010)

== See also ==
- List of number-one dance hits (United States)
- List of artists who reached number one on the US Dance chart
