= Sebastian Arocha Morton =

American music producer

Sebastian Arocha Morton (Sebastian Morton)
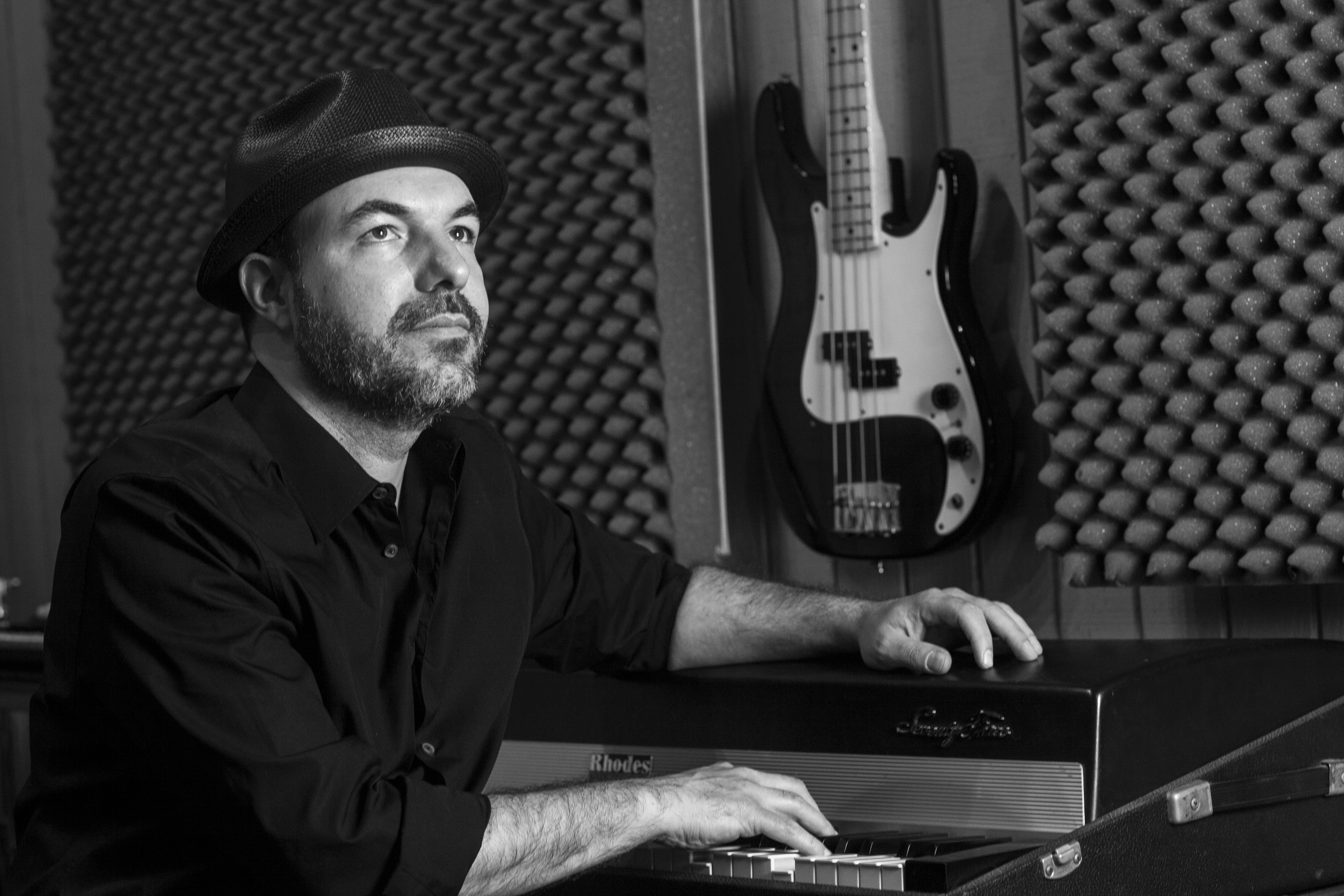

Background information
- Born: United States
- Genres: Electronic; cinematic; soul; others
- Occupations: Producer; composer; songwriter
- Years active: 2000s–present
- Labels: ROCAsound; OM; Universal
- Website: www.rocasound.com

Sebastian Arocha Morton is a Grammy-nominated American record producer and composer based in Los Angeles, California. Throughout his career as a record producer and songwriter, Morton has worked with many notable artists, including Seal, Sting, Santana, Donna Summer, Fischerspooner, Vikter Duplaix, Common, and Mary J. Blige. Morton was also a composer and producer for the films Little Miss Sunshine, Iron Man 2, Houdini, RoboCop, The SpongeBob Movie: Sponge Out of Water, League of Gods, Mr. Robot, and Young Sheldon.

Morton composes and fuses a wide variety of musical genres, ranging from dance to hip hop, soul and ambient, among various other genres. His approach to film scoring bridges the worlds of modern electronic production and more traditional melodic orchestral composing.

== Education and career ==
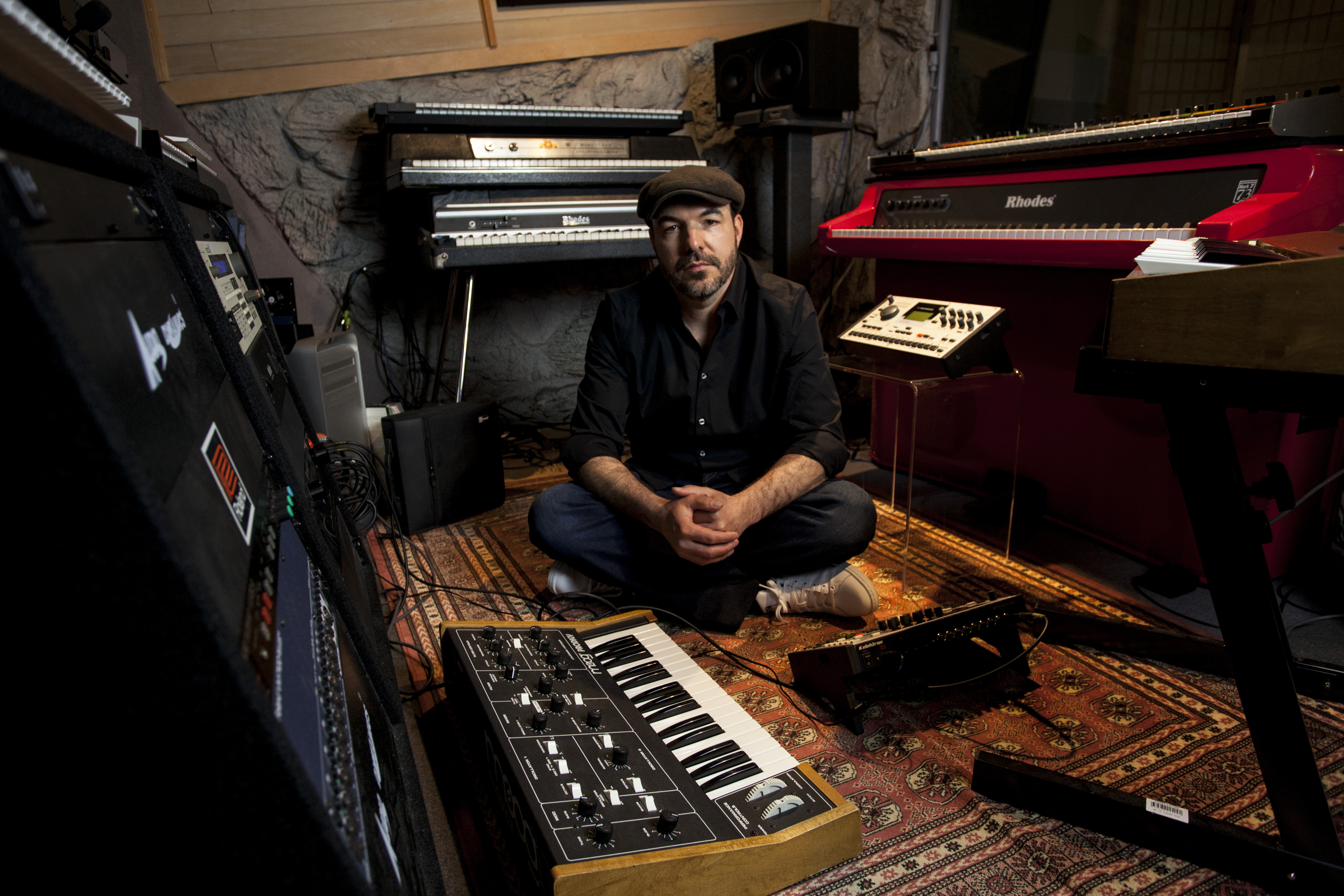
Morton at the ROCAsound studio in 2019

Morton graduated from the Berklee College of Music in Boston, where he studied film scoring and production/engineering. Afterwards, he moved to Los Angeles, California to pursue a career in the film and music industries as a staff writer for Universal Music.

Morton then began producing electronic music in the early 2000s under the artist name ROCAsound. After several Billboard #1 singles and platinum albums, he started his own production company and opened a recording facility under the same name. As ROCAsound, he has remixed and produced tracks for the soundtrack to Iron Man 2, as well as songs and remixes for Donna Summer, Sting, Chaka Khan, Seal, The Dandy Warhols, Counting Crows, Jody Watley, The Killers, Kaskade, Ricky Martin, Yuridia, and Fischerspooner, among various other artists.

After much success as ROCAsound, Morton discovered and signed Billboard #1 electronic artist Samantha James, and went on to write and produce the albums Subconscious and Rise for San Francisco label OM Records. Morton later worked on Donna Summer's final studio album Crayons, where he was credited among producers such as Greg Kurstin and J.R. Rotem. The first single for that record, "I'm a Fire" (produced and co-written by Morton), went to #1 on the charts and set a record for her as the only female artist in history with a #1 Billboard dance hit in every decade since the 1970s. Also, as a songwriter, Morton has worked closely with hit writers Claudia Brant and Bruce Sudano.

Other collaborations include:

- "One of These Days" (with Santana and Ozomatli)
- "Never Coming Home" for the Queer Eye for the Straight Guy soundtrack (with Sting)
- "Not in Love" (with Enrique Iglesias and Floetry)
- "Scent of Magnolia" (with David Sylvian and Ryuichi Sakamoto)
- Alex Cross (film collaboration with composer John Debney)
- Disney Parks: World of Color and Iron Man Experience (collaboration with composer John Debney)
- "Whenever I Say Your Name" (BBC Radio version) with Sting feat. Mary J. Blige
- "Superfreak" (ROCAsound Revamp) with Rick James

== Filmography ==
Year	Title	Director(s)	Notes
1999	Los Beltrán	Mike Milligan	Composer
2000	Los Beltrán (Season 2)	Carlos Bermudez	Theme Song
2001	The Score	Frank Oz	Song: “The Hacker”
2001	La Segunda Noche	Alejandro Gamboa	Executive Music Producer
2002	Boomtown	Graham Yost	With W.G. Snuffy Walden
2002	Anna's Dream	Colin Bickley	Songwriter
2003	Elysium	Jae-Woong Kwon	Composer
2003	Knock First	David Collins	Composer
2003	Miss Match	Darren Star	Music Producer, Songwriter
2005	Americano	Kevin Noland	Composer
2005	Cold Case	Jerry Bruckheimer	Music Programmer, Sound Designer
2005	Queer Eye for the Straight Girl	David Collins	Composer
2006	Dr. Dolittle 3	Rich Thorne	Musical Director, Producer
2006	Windfall	Laurie McCarthy	Main Theme Composer
2006	What About Brian	Dana Stevens	Music Programmer, Sound Designer
2006	Peaceful Warrior	Victor Salva	Additional Music with composer Bennett Salvay
2006	Little Miss Sunshine	Jonathan Dayton & Valerie Faris	Music Producer, Remixer
2006	Queer Eye for the Straight Guy	David Collins	Composer
2006	Starting Over	Alex Miltsch	Guest Music Producer
2007	The Air I Breathe	Jieho Lee	with composer Marcelo Zarvos
2007	The Unit	David Mamet	Score Producer
2007	CSI: New York	Ann Donahue	Electronic Music Producer
2008	What Just Happened	Barry Levinson	with composer Marcelo Zarvos
2008	CSI: Miami	Carol Mendelsohn	Source Music
2008	Life with Derek	Daphne Ballon	Songwriter
2008	Shark	Ian Biederman	Songwriter
2010	Iron Man 2	Jon Favreau	Electronic Music Programmer, Sound Designer
2010	Terriers	Ted Griffin	with Robert Duncan
2010	The Cutting Edge: Fire and Ice	Stephen Herek	Music Programmer, Sound Designer
2011	Carjacked	John Bonito	with Bennett Salvay
2011	Disney World of Color	Disney Parks	with John Debney
2012	Bachelorette	Leslye Headland	Music Producer
2012	Alex Cross	Rob Cohen	with John Debney
2012	Mario Frangoulis: Live with the Boston Pops	Matt Askem	Composer: “Rojo Violento”
2012	Cybergeddon	Anthony E. Zuiker	Music Programmer, Sound Designer
2012	Fringe	J. J. Abrams	Song: “Angel Love”
2013	King John	Ted Wass	Composer
2014	RoboCop	Jose Padilha	with Pedro Bromfman
2014	Draft Day	Ivan Reitman	with John Debney
2014	Houdini	Uli Edel	Composer
2014	Matador	Jay Beattie	Soundtrack Producer
2014	Partners	Robert Horn	Music Programmer
2014	The After	Chris Carter	Composer
2015	The SpongeBob Movie: Sponge Out of Water	Paul Tibbitt	with John Debney
2015	Penn Zero: Part-Time Hero	Sam Levine	Music Remixer
2015	American Odyssey	Nora Kay Foster	Composer
2015	Minions: Paradise	Miriam Wilson	Video Game
2016	League of Gods	Koan Hui	Co-Composer with John Debney, Soundtrack Producer
2016	Fuller House	Jeff Franklin	Electronic Music Producer
2016	Game of Silence	David Hudgins	Composer
2016	Mr. Robot	Sam Esmail	with Bennet Salvay
2016	The Grand Tour	Phil Churchward	Composer
2017	Deep	Julio Soto Gurpide	Music Producer
2017	Young Sheldon	Chuck Lorre	Composer, Additional Music
2017	Linda from HR	Jeff Barbanell	Composer
2018	Augie	James Keach	Composer
2018	Evidence of Innocence	Robert Ivkovic	Composer
2018	Reasonable Doubt	Rob Rosen	Songwriter
2018	The Orville (Season 1)	Seth MacFarlane	Music Producer, Additional Music
2019	The Orville (Season 2)	Seth MacFarlane	Music Producer, Additional Music
2019	Madden NFL 19	Mike Young	with John Debney
2019	Marvel Land: Summer of Superheroes	Disney Imagineering	Music Producer, Additional Music

== Selected awards ==
Some of Morton's Grammy Award nominations include:

- 2006 Grammy nominee: Little Miss Sunshine (Best Compilation Soundtrack Album for Motion Picture, Television or Other Visual Media)
- 2007 Grammy nominee (with Vikter Duplaix): "Make A Baby" (Best Urban/Alternative Category)

Billboard #1 Singles and Albums include:

- 2004 Billboard Electronic Albums Chart: Queer Eye for the Straight Guy soundtrack (Never Coming Home feat. Sting)
- 2005 Dance Singles Chart: Jody Watley - "Looking for a New Love" (remixes)
- 2007 Dance Singles Chart: Samantha James - "Rise"
- 2008 Dance Singles Chart: Donna Summer - "I'm a Fire"
- 2009 Latin Albums Chart: Luis Miguel - No Culpes a La Noche
