= Burgundy Records =

Record label

- Parent company: Sony Music Entertainment
- Founded: 2006
- Defunct: 2010
- Status: defunct
- Distributor(s): Burgundy Records
- Genre: Various
- Country of origin: U.S.
- Official website: www.burgundyrecords.com

Burgundy Records was an American record label and subsidiary of Sony Music Entertainment.

== History ==
In January 2006, the Sony BMG Strategic Marketing Group (SMG) announced the launch of its new record label, Burgundy Records. The new Sony BMG imprint label, which was spearheaded by former Executive Vice President Joe DiMuro, later ran by J.J. Rosen, previously an executive in Sony BMG's Digital Business Group, was set to sign multi-platinum artists and release new titles in conjunction with marketing campaigns that promoted the artists through traditional and non-traditional channels. Burgundy's first artists signed were musicians Chaka Khan and Aaron Neville.

Burgundy Records was set to sign additional artists who have retained strong consumer affinity and produced a catalog of music that is still relevant and appreciated today. The label's primary target audience was adult consumers who are fans of the artists' earlier work and are eager to hear new material. In tandem with this outreach to a loyal consumer base, the label also brought widespread exposure for these artists and their new music to a contemporary audience.

Central to every project executed by SMG was the concept of a "360-Degree Approach." By operating like an agency, the Group analyzed artists from different angles and promoted them through a variety of channels, such as licensing, strategic partnerships, mobile applications, DRTV, tour marketing and publicity.

As of January 2010, Burgundy Records may have been discontinued, since its official website is redirected to Legacy Recordings' website.

== Burgundy Artists ==
Artists on the final Burgundy Records roster included (listed alphabetically):

- America
- Gloria Estefan
- Julio Iglesias
- Chaka Khan
- Aaron Neville
- The New Orleans Social Club
- Donna Summer
- Henry Lewis

== See also ==
- List of record labels
