= List of Florida Panthers head coaches =

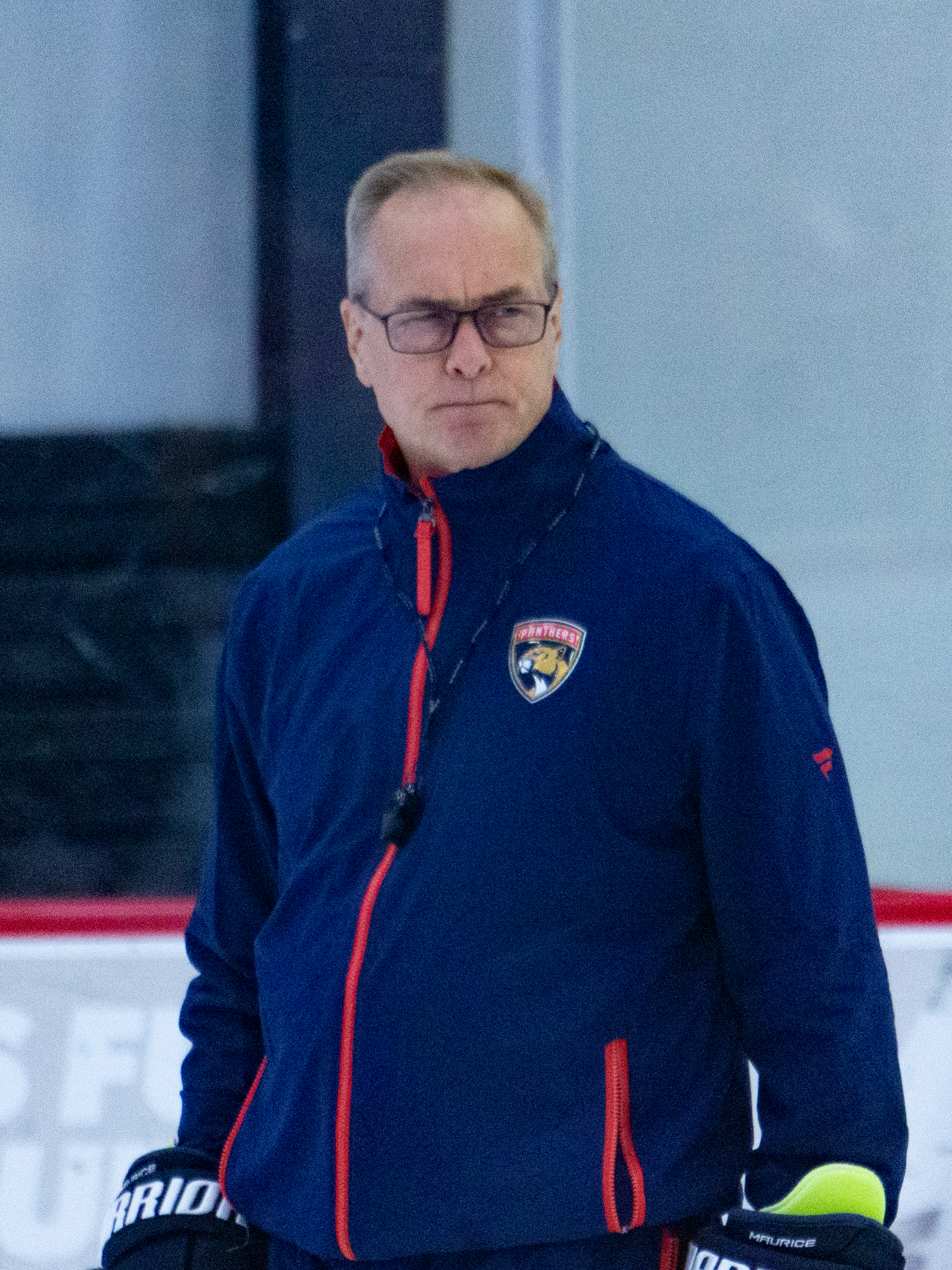
Paul Maurice has been head coach since 2022

The Florida Panthers are an American professional ice hockey team based in the Miami metropolitan area. They play in the Atlantic Division of the Eastern Conference in the National Hockey League (NHL). The team joined the NHL in 1993 as an expansion team, and won their first Eastern Conference championship in 1996. The Panthers have played their home games at the Amerant Bank Arena since 1998. The Panthers are owned by Sunrise Sports and Entertainment, and Bill Zito is their general manager.

There have been 16 head coaches for the Panthers franchise. The team's first head coach was Roger Neilson, who coached for two complete seasons from 1993 to 1995. The Panther's current head coach is Paul Maurice.

== Key ==
#	Number of coaches^{[a]}
GC	Games coached
W	Wins = 2 points
L	Losses = 0 points
T	Ties = 1 point
OT	Overtime/shootout losses = 1 point^{[b]}
PTS	Points
Win%	Winning percentage^{[c]}
†	Elected to the Hockey Hall of Fame as a builder
*	Spent entire NHL coaching career with the Panthers

== Coaches ==
Note: Statistics are correct through the end of the 2025–26 season.

Head coaches of the Florida Panthers
#	Name	Term^{[d]}	Regular season						Playoffs				Achievements	Reference
#	Name	Term^{[d]}	GC	W	L	T/OT	PTS	Win%	GC	W	L	Win%	Achievements	Reference
1	Roger Neilson†	1993–1995	132	53	56	23	129	.489	—	—	—	—		
2	Doug MacLean	1995–1997	187	83	71	33	199	.532	27	13	14	.481	1 Stanley Cup Final appearance (1996); 1 conference title and 2 playoff appearances	
3	Bryan Murray	1997–1998	59	17	31	11	45	.381	—	—	—	—		
4	Terry Murray	1998–2000	200	79	79	42	200	.500	4	0	4	.000	1 playoff appearance	
5	Duane Sutter*	2000–2001	72	22	35	15	59	.410	—	—	—	—		
6	Mike Keenan	2001–2003	153	45	73	35	125	.408	—	—	—	—		
7	Rick Dudley	2003–2004	40	13	15	12	38	.475	—	—	—	—		
8	John Torchetti	2004	27	10	12	5	25	.463	—	—	—	—		
9	Jacques Martin	2005–2008	246	110	100	36	256	.520	—	—	—	—		
10	Peter DeBoer	2008–2011	246	103	107	36	242	.492	—	—	—	—		
11	Kevin Dineen*	2011–2013	146	56	62	28	140	.479	7	3	4	.429	1 division title and 1 playoff appearance	
12	Peter Horachek	2013–2014	66	26	36	4	56	.424	—	—	—	—		
13	Gerard Gallant	2014–2016	164	85	55	24	194	.591	6	2	4	.333	1 division title and 1 playoff appearance	
14	Tom Rowe*	2016–2017	61	24	27	10	58	.475	—	—	—	—		
15	Bob Boughner	2017–2019	164	80	62	22	182	.555	—	—	—	—		
16	Joel Quenneville	2019–2021	132	79	40	13	171	.648	14^{[e]}	4	10	.286	2 playoff appearances	
17	Andrew Brunette	2021–2022	75	51	18	6	108	.720	10	4	6	.400	1 division title and 1 playoff appearance; Presidents' Trophy winners (2022)	
18	Paul Maurice	2022–present	328	181	125	22	384	.585	45	29	16	.644	2 Stanley Cup championships (2024, 2025); 3 Stanley Cup Final appearances (2023, 2024, 2025); 3 conference titles, 1 division title, 3 playoff appearances	

== Notes ==
- ^{a} A running total of the number of coaches of the Panthers. Thus, any coach who has two or more separate terms as head coach is only counted once.
- ^{b} Before the 2005–06 season, the NHL instituted a penalty shootout for regular season games that remained tied after a five-minute overtime period, which prevented ties.
- ^{c} In hockey, the winning percentage is calculated by dividing points by maximum possible points.
- ^{d} Each year is linked to an article about that particular NHL season.
- ^{e} Includes the Qualifying Round of the 2020 Stanley Cup playoffs.
