= Gerard Gallant =

Canadian ice hockey player and coach

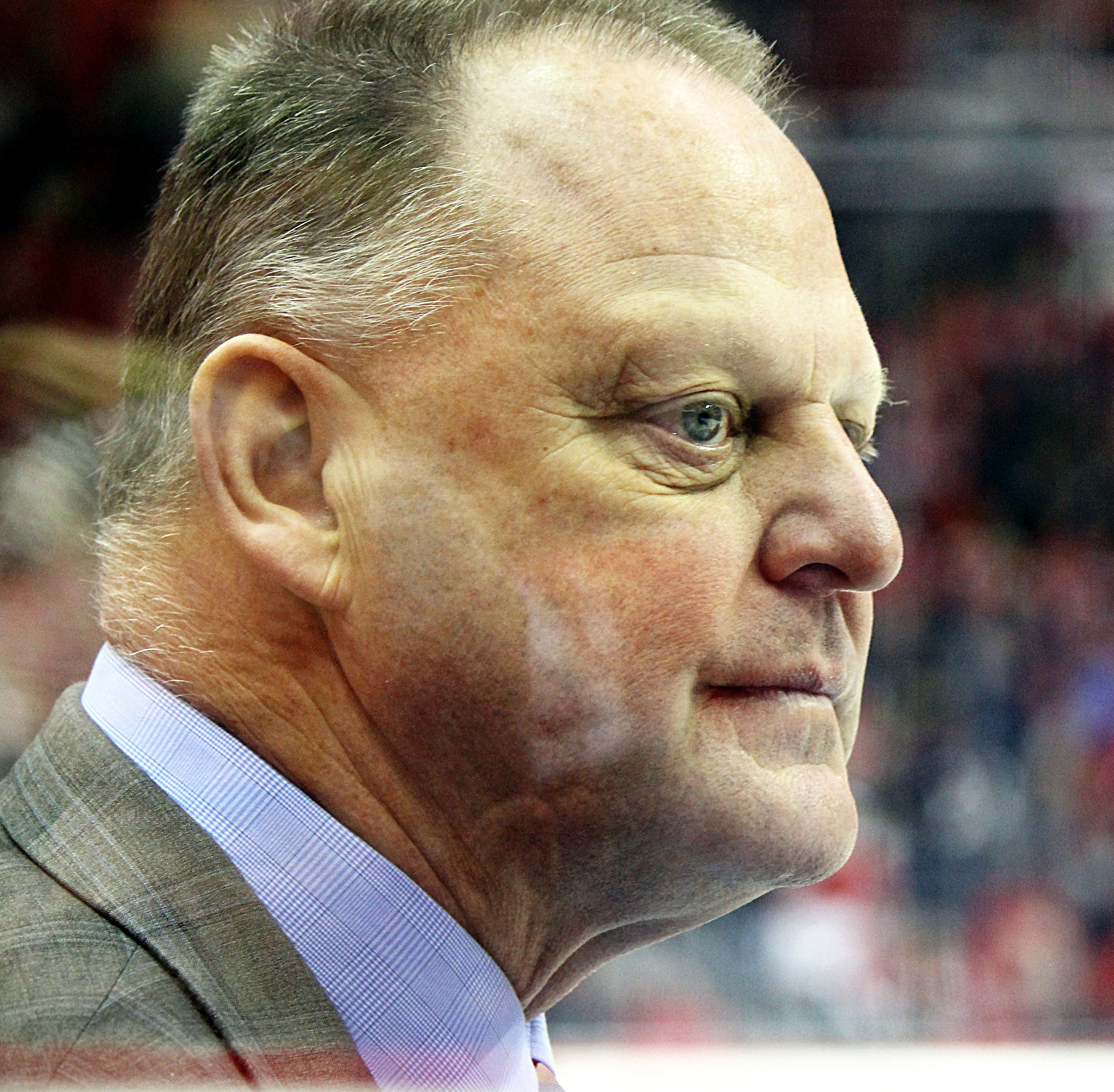
- Gallant with the Vegas Golden Knights in 2018
- Born: September 2, 1963 (age 63) Summerside, Prince Edward Island, Canada
- Height: 5 ft 10 in (178 cm)
- Weight: 190 lb (86 kg; 13 st 8 lb)
- Position: Left wing
- Shot: Left
- Played for: Detroit Red Wings; Tampa Bay Lightning
- Coached for: Columbus Blue Jackets; Florida Panthers; Vegas Golden Knights; New York Rangers; Shanghai Dragons
- National team: Canada
- NHL draft: 107th overall, 1981; Detroit Red Wings
- Playing career: 1984–1995
- Coaching career: 1998–present
Medal record
Men's ice hockey
Representing Canada
World Championships
Silver medal – second place	1989 Sweden

Gerard Gallant (born September 2, 1963) is a Canadian professional ice hockey coach and former player who was most recently the head coach for the Shanghai Dragons of the Kontinental Hockey League (KHL). He has previously served as the head coach in the National Hockey League (NHL) for the Columbus Blue Jackets (2004–2006), Florida Panthers (2014–2016) and Vegas Golden Knights (2017–2020) and New York Rangers (2021–2023). He is a three-time finalist for the Jack Adams Award for NHL coach of the year, winning the award in 2018 for the Golden Knights' first season. He was also a two-time Canadian Hockey League (CHL) coach of the year during his tenure with the Saint John Sea Dogs, where the team secured two President's Cup victories and one Memorial Cup.

Gallant previously played eleven seasons in the NHL, primarily for the Detroit Red Wings, but also including a short stint with the Tampa Bay Lightning.

== Early life ==
Gallant was born in Summerside, Prince Edward Island. He grew up near a local ice rink and was often found sweeping the stands with his buddies in exchange for extra ice time. Gallant has had the nickname "Turk" since he was three or four years old. Gallant stated that when he first got to the NHL, a lot of the guys also called him "Spuddy" because of Prince Edward Island's reputation as the potato capital of Canada.

While playing for the Summerside Crystals of the Maritime Junior A Hockey League at the age of 16, he netted 60 goals and 115 points in just 45 games.

As a junior, Gallant played for three teams in the Quebec Major Junior Hockey League: the Sherbrooke Castors (1980–81, 1981–82), the St. Jean Beavers (1982–83), and the Verdun Juniors (1982–83). Gallant served as team captain during his final year in juniors.

After his first junior season in 1981, Gallant finished as runner-up to Claude Verret in voting for 1980–81 Michel Bergeron Trophy as QMJHL offensive rookie of the year.

== Playing career ==
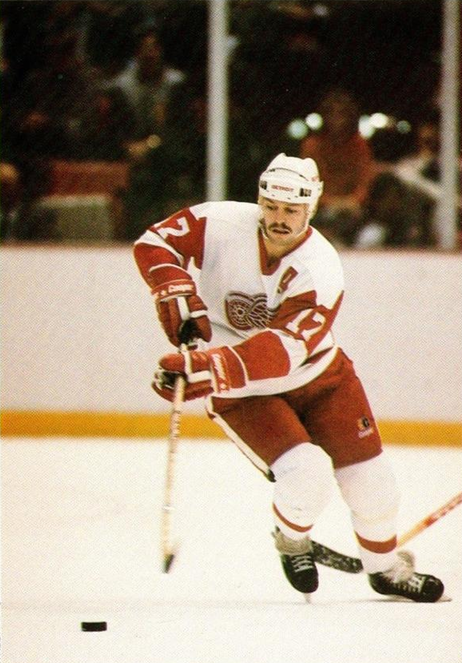
Gallant with the Detroit Red Wings in 1987

Gallant was drafted by the Detroit Red Wings in the 1981 NHL entry draft, sixth round, 107th overall.

Gallant made his professional debut with the Adirondack Red Wings of the American Hockey League (AHL) in 1983. At the age of 19, he was the youngest regular on the roster. Spending the full 1983–84 season in the minor league, he finished with 31 goals, 64 points, and 195 penalty minutes in 77 games.

Gallant split the 1984–85 season between the AHL and NHL, making his Detroit Red Wings debut against the New York Islanders on January 22, 1985. In his first game, he scored against Islanders' goaltender Billy Smith in the second period of a 5–4 Detroit victory that snapped a 12-game Red Wings' winless streak. In his second game, he fought Rangers' forward Bob Brooke.

Gallant opened the 1985–86 season as a full-time regular with the Red Wings. However, in a December 11 game against the Minnesota North Stars, he suffered a broken jaw during a fight with Dirk Graham. Gallant's jaw had to be wired shut for six weeks, causing him to miss six weeks of games. When he returned, he sported a football-style face mask on his helmet. He ultimately appeared in 52 games, scoring 20 goals with 39 points and 106 penalty minutes. Gallant was part of an unfortunate incident in a November 26, 1986, game between the Toronto Maple Leafs and Red Wings in Detroit. During a scrum in front of the Leafs net, Gallant accidentally cut the face of Börje Salming with his skate blade after Salming had been knocked down. The injury required facial surgery and more than two hundred stitches to Salming's face.

Gallant's career took off after Jacques Demers was hired as the Red Wings head coach in 1986. In his next four seasons, he averaged 36 goals, 80 points, and 235 penalty minutes. While he never played in the All-Star Game, he was named to the NHL All-Star Second Team for the 1988–89 NHL season.

Injuries, mostly to his back, caused Gallant to miss over 30 games over the 1990–91 NHL season. In March 1991, he was forced to undergo surgery to remove a bone spur from his back, causing him to miss the rest of the regular season and the playoffs. Gallant returned to the Wings as a full-time regular for the 1991–92 and 1992–93 seasons. He provided his usual physical presence and finished with a +16 and +20 plus/minus rating; however, was unable to duplicate his scoring prowess and the Wings did not offer him a contract to return.

On July 22, 1993, Gallant signed as a free agent with the Tampa Bay Lightning. He played in 51 games with the Lightning in 1993–94 and one game in the lockout-shortened 1995 season, along with 16 games with the Atlanta Knights, the Lightning's top farm team in the International Hockey League (IHL).

On October 23, 1995, Gallant signed as a free agent with the Detroit Vipers of the IHL and was off to a good start with two goals and an assist in three games. However, on November 5, 1995, he suffered a career-ending back injury in practice and was forced to retire at the age of 32. Gallant finished his NHL career with 211 goals in 615 games as a left winger for the Red Wings and Lightning. He also scored 18 playoff goals.

== International play ==
Gallant played for Team Canada at the 1989 World Ice Hockey Championships under head coach Dave King. Playing alongside Red Wings teammate Steve Yzerman, Gallant scored two goals and had three assists in eight games as the Canadians won the silver medal.

== Player profile ==
Despite his smaller stature (5 ft 10 in, 180 lbs), Gallant played the role of power forward during his time with the Red Wings – similar to NHL contemporary Kevin Dineen. Playing on the Red Wings top line alongside star Steve Yzerman and either Bob Probert or Paul MacLean, he was among the team leaders in both goals and penalty minutes. Gallant's 1988–89 line of 39 goals, 54 assists, and 230 penalty minutes was the first of its kind in NHL history, only matched later by Kevin Stevens in 1991–92 and Rick Tocchet in 1992–93. Detroit's coach at the time, Jacques Demers, said he thought Gallant's penchant for fighting was the only thing holding him back from a 50-goal season. Gallant had taken part in 17 fights in 1986–87, 19 fights in 1987–88, and 10 fights in 1988–89.

Gallant was a popular teammate and served as an alternate captain alongside Bob Probert, Rick Zombo, or Steve Chiasson. He served as acting captain while Steve Yzerman was injured from March 2, 1988, through May 5, 1988.

Former Wings head coach and later Ottawa Senators scout Nick Polano said of Gallant: "He was a tough kid, a tough competitor... and I'll tell you, he was a [expletive] to play against."

== Coaching career ==
Gallant began his coaching career in 1995–96 with his hometown Summerside Capitals of the Maritime Junior Hockey League, leading the team to the Royal Bank Cup in 1997.

Gallant then moved on to the professional coaching ranks, serving as an assistant coach for the Fort Wayne Komets of the IHL in 1998. He spent the 1999–2000 season serving as an assistant for the Louisville Panthers of the AHL under head coach Joe Paterson, a former teammate of Gallant's in Detroit.

Gallant then served as an assistant for the Columbus Blue Jackets of the NHL from 2001 to 2004 under head coaches Dave King and Doug MacLean. King had served as Gallant's head coach for Team Canada at the 1989 World Ice Hockey Championships. MacLean had been an assistant coach with the Red Wings in the early 1990s. MacLean, who was also serving as the Blue Jackets general manager, resigned as head coach on January 1, 2004, and named Gallant as his successor. Gallant's assistant position was filled by veteran college hockey coach Dean Blais. Gallant served as the Blue Jackets head coach for the remainder of the 2003–04 season, through the 2004–05 season lost to the NHL lockout, all of the 2005–06 season, and a portion of the 2006–07 season. On November 13, 2006, Gallant was fired as head coach and was replaced by assistant Gary Agnew for five games. The Blue Jackets hired Ken Hitchcock as full-time coach on November 22, 2006.

In 2007, Gallant was named by Team Canada general manager Steve Yzerman as one of the two assistant coaches for the 2007 Men's World Ice Hockey Championships. Gallant helped the Canadian team to a championship and gold medal finish.

Gallant joined the New York Islanders as an assistant coach for the 2007–08 and 2008–09 seasons. Then head coach of the Islanders, Ted Nolan, had been a teammate of Gallant's on the Adirondack Red Wings in 1983.

On April 24, 2009, Gallant was named head coach of the Saint John Sea Dogs of the QMJHL. During his three seasons with Saint John, he compiled a 159-34-9 record and led the Sea Dogs to three first-place finishes, three league final appearances, two QMJHL championships (2011 and 2012), and one Memorial Cup (2011). Gallant was also named the QMJHL and Canadian Hockey League Coach of the Year twice (2010 and 2011).

On June 15, 2012, Gallant returned to the NHL when he was appointed as an assistant coach with the Montreal Canadiens under Michel Therrien. The Canadiens' general manager Marc Bergevin had been a teammate of Gallant with the Tampa Bay Lightning in the 1990s.

On June 21, 2014, he was named head coach of the NHL's Florida Panthers by then-executive vice president and general manager, Dale Tallon. In his first season, he led the Panthers to a record of 38 wins, 29 losses, 5 overtime losses, and 10 shoot-out losses for 91 points. The record was an improvement of 9 wins and 25 points over the prior season. In 2015–16, Gallant led the upstart Panthers to a 24–12–4 record at the All-Star break, earning him a spot in the all-star game as the head coach for the Atlantic Division All-Stars. The Panthers finished with a club-record 47 wins and 103 points, enough for the second division title in franchise history. For his efforts, Gallant was named as a finalist for the Jack Adams Award. On November 27, 2016, Gallant was fired by new Panthers general manager Tom Rowe after posting an 11–10–1 record to start the season.

On April 13, 2017, Gallant was announced as the first head coach of the Vegas Golden Knights.

Gallant led the Golden Knights to one of the most successful debut seasons for an expansion team in North American major professional sports history. On January 3, 2018, it was announced that Gallant would coach the Pacific Division All-Stars in the 2018 NHL All-Star Game. On February 1, 2018, the Golden Knights set the NHL record for most wins (34) by an expansion franchise in league history. The mark was set in only 50 games played. They clinched the Pacific Division title on March 31, becoming the first true expansion team in the four major sports to do so (not counting all-expansion divisions). On April 25, 2018, Gallant was nominated for the Jack Adams Award for the second time, which he would be awarded on June 20. Under his watch, the Golden Knights advanced to the Stanley Cup Final, losing to the Washington Capitals in five games.

Gallant would lead the Golden Knights to another playoff appearance in 2019, losing in the Western Conference first round to the San Jose Sharks.

Gallant was fired by the Golden Knights on January 15, 2020, after a four-game losing streak. Peter DeBoer was subsequently named the second head coach in franchise history. Gallant had called DeBoer a "clown" in a public press conference during Vegas' first-round playoff series against the San Jose Sharks (whom DeBoer coached at the time) the previous year.

On April 28, 2021, Gallant was announced as the head coach of Team Canada for the 2021 IIHF World Championship. After an 0–3 start to the tournament, Team Canada won the gold medal in a 3–2 win in sudden death overtime to defeat Team Finland and give Canada its 27th world title.

On June 16, 2021, Gallant was announced as the head coach of the New York Rangers, replacing David Quinn.

On April 2, 2023, Gallant became the first to coach the Rangers to back-to-back 100-point seasons in his first two years with the franchise. He left the Rangers after their first-round playoff exit in 2023.

In December 2024, Gallant coached Canada at the 2024 Spengler Cup.

On August 13, 2025, Gallant was named head coach of the Shanghai Dragons of the Kontinental Hockey League (KHL). On January 12, 2026, Gallant stepped down as head coach of the Shanghai Dragons due to health issues.

== Personal life ==
Gallant and his wife, Pam, are the parents of two children, Melissa and Jason. Melissa is married to former professional hockey player Darryl Boyce. Jason played four seasons with the Summerside Western Capitals of the MJAHL and currently coaches youth hockey.

== Awards and championships ==
=== As a player ===
- QMJHL championship: 1982
- QMJHL championship: 1983
- QMJHL All-Star Third Team: 1982–83
- NHL All-Star second team: 1988–89
- IIHF World Championship – silver medal: 1989

=== As a coach ===
- RBC Cup: 1997
- Prince Edward Island Sports Hall of Fame: inducted 2001
- Brian Kilrea Coach of the Year Award: 2010, 2011
- IIHF World Championship – gold medal: 2007, 2021
- QMJHL League championship: 2011, 2012
- Memorial Cup championship: 2011
- Ron Lapointe Trophy – QMJHL Coach of the Year: 2011
- NHL All-Star Game: 2016, 2018
- Jack Adams Award: 2018
- The Hockey News, Scotty Bowman Award (Best Coach): 2018

== Career statistics ==
			Regular season					Playoffs
Season	Team	League	GP	G	A	Pts	PIM	GP	G	A	Pts	PIM
1979–80	Summerside Crystals	MJrHL	45	60	55	115	90	—	—	—	—	—
1980–81	Sherbrooke Castors	QMJHL	68	41	59	100	265	14	6	13	19	46
1981–82	Sherbrooke Castors	QMJHL	58	34	58	92	260	22	14	24	38	84
1981–82	Sherbrooke Castors	MC	—	—	—	—	—	5	5	3	8	28
1982–83	St-Jean Castors	QMJHL	33	28	25	53	139	—	—	—	—	—
1982–83	Verdun Juniors	QMJHL	29	26	49	75	105	15	14	19	33	84
1982–83	Verdun Juniors	MC	—	—	—	—	—	4	3	1	4	23
1983–84	Adirondack Red Wings	AHL	77	31	33	64	195	7	1	3	4	34
1984–85	Detroit Red Wings	NHL	32	6	12	18	66	3	0	0	0	11
1984–85	Adirondack Red Wings	AHL	46	18	29	47	131	—	—	—	—	—
1985–86	Detroit Red Wings	NHL	52	20	19	39	106	—	—	—	—	—
1986–87	Detroit Red Wings	NHL	80	38	34	72	216	16	8	6	14	43
1987–88	Detroit Red Wings	NHL	73	34	39	73	242	16	6	9	15	55
1988–89	Detroit Red Wings	NHL	76	39	54	93	230	6	1	2	3	40
1989–90	Detroit Red Wings	NHL	69	36	44	80	254	—	—	—	—	—
1990–91	Detroit Red Wings	NHL	45	10	16	26	111	—	—	—	—	—
1991–92	Detroit Red Wings	NHL	69	14	22	36	187	11	2	2	4	25
1992–93	Detroit Red Wings	NHL	67	10	20	30	188	6	1	2	3	4
1993–94	Tampa Bay Lightning	NHL	51	4	9	13	74	—	—	—	—	—
1994–95	Atlanta Knights	IHL	16	3	3	6	31	—	—	—	—	—
1994–95	Tampa Bay Lightning	NHL	1	0	0	0	0	—	—	—	—	—
1995–96	Detroit Vipers	IHL	3	2	1	3	6	—	—	—	—	—
NHL totals			615	211	269	480	1,674	58	18	21	39	178

== Head coaching record ==
Team	Year	Regular season							Postseason			
Team	Year	G	W	L	T	OTL	Pts	Finish	W	L	Win%	Result
CBJ	2003–04	45	16	24	4	1	(37)	4th in Central	—	—	—	Missed playoffs
CBJ	2005–06	82	35	43	—	4	74	3rd in Central	—	—	—	Missed playoffs
CBJ	2006–07	15	5	9	—	1	(11)	(fired)	—	—	—	—
CBJ total		142	56	76	4	6			—	—	—	
FLA	2014–15	82	38	29	—	15	91	6th in Atlantic	—	—	—	Missed playoffs
FLA	2015–16	82	47	26	—	9	103	1st in Atlantic	2	4	.333	Lost in first round (NYI)
FLA	2016–17	22	11	10	—	1	(23)	(fired)	—	—	—	—
FLA total		186	96	65	—	25			2	4	.333	1 playoff appearance
VGK	2017–18	82	51	24	—	7	109	1st in Pacific	13	7	.650	Lost in Stanley Cup Final (WSH)
VGK	2018–19	82	43	32	—	7	93	3rd in Pacific	3	4	.429	Lost in first round (SJS)
VGK	2019–20	49	24	19	—	6	(54)	(fired)	—	—	—	—
VGK total		213	118	75	—	20			16	11	.593	2 playoff appearances
NYR	2021–22	82	52	24	—	6	110	2nd in Metropolitan	10	10	.500	Lost in conference finals (TBL)
NYR	2022–23	82	47	22	—	13	107	3rd in Metropolitan	3	4	.429	Lost in first round (NJD)
NYR total		164	99	46	—	19			13	14	.481	2 playoff appearances
Total		705	369	262	4	70			31	29	.517	5 playoff appearances

Preceded by Doug MacLean	Head coach of the Columbus Blue Jackets; 2004–2006	Succeeded by Gary Agnew
Preceded by Peter Horachek	Head coach of the Florida Panthers; 2014–2016	Succeeded by Tom Rowe
Preceded by Position created	Head coach of the Vegas Golden Knights; 2017–2020	Succeeded by Peter DeBoer
Preceded by David Quinn	Head coach of the New York Rangers; 2021–2023	Succeeded by Peter Laviolette
