= Dale Tallon =

Canadian ice hockey player, executive (born 1950)

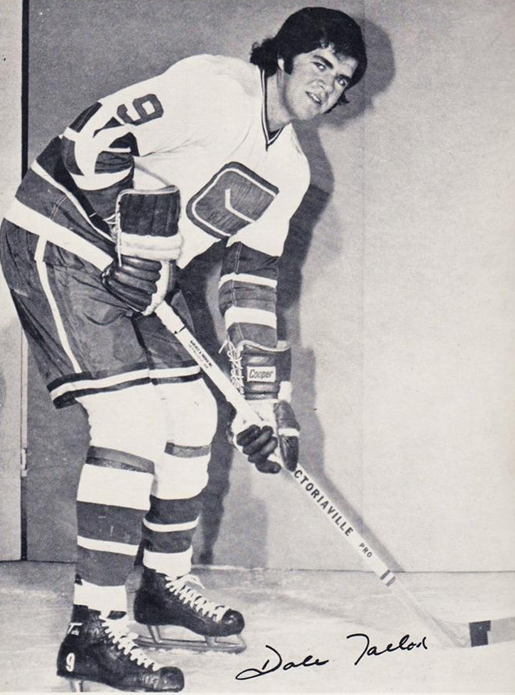
- Born: October 19, 1950 (age 75) Noranda, Quebec, Canada
- Height: 6 ft 1 in (185 cm)
- Weight: 195 lb (88 kg; 13 st 13 lb)
- Position: Defence
- Shot: Left
- Played for: Vancouver Canucks; Chicago Black Hawks; Pittsburgh Penguins
- National team: Canada
- NHL draft: 2nd overall, 1970; Vancouver Canucks
- Playing career: 1970–1980

Michael "Dale" Tallon (born October 19, 1950) is a Canadian ice hockey executive and former player. He played in the NHL for ten years as a defenceman for the Vancouver Canucks, Chicago Black Hawks and the Pittsburgh Penguins. Following his retirement as a player, Tallon began a broadcasting career with the Blackhawks lasting 16 years. In 1998, he joined the front office as director of player personnel before working his way up to general manager. Serving in the latter capacity from 2005 to 2009, he helped rebuild the team into a Stanley Cup winner in 2010, at which point he had been demoted to assistant general manager. In May 2010, he was named general manager for the Panthers for the 2010–11 NHL season, serving in that position until August 2020. He returned to the Canucks organization in 2022 as a scout and senior adviser. Tallon is also a distinguished golfer, having won the 1969 Canadian Junior Golf Championship and participated in the Canadian PGA Tour.

== Playing career ==
=== Junior ===
Tallon played in the 1961 Quebec International Pee-Wee Hockey Tournament with Noranda. He began his junior career at sixteen years old with the Oshawa Generals of the Ontario Hockey Association. Highly anticipated in Oshawa, he went on to score 12 goals and 43 points over 50 games as a rookie in 1967–68. Despite leading all General defencemen in scoring and ranking third on the team overall, he was traded to the Toronto Marlboros in the off-season in exchange for five players.

In Toronto, he improved to 17 goals and 49 points over 48 games. In 1969–70, his third and last junior year, Tallon recorded OHA career-highs of 39 goals, 40 assists and 79 points (10th in league scoring) over 54 games. He added 12 goals and 29 points over 18 playoff games, as the Marlboros lost to the Montreal Jr. Canadiens in the J. Ross Robertson Cup Finals. Tallon has recalled "forcing things" in his first two junior years due to his playing in new cities with high expectations of him and that it wasn't until his last year that he "finally relaxed and it all came together."

=== Professional ===
Having completed a successful third season in the OHA, Tallon was among the top prospects going into the 1970 NHL Amateur Draft. Selected second overall, he went to the Vancouver Canucks, a new franchise in the NHL. They had lost the first overall pick in a lottery draw to their fellow expansion team, the Buffalo Sabres, who selected Gilbert Perreault. In his rookie season, he scored 14 goals and led the Canucks with 42 assists. His 17 goals for Vancouver in 1971–72 was a career high. A leading scorer on the team, Tallon represented the Canucks in the 1971 and 1972 NHL All-Star Games.

Following his second NHL season, Tallon was selected to Team Canada's roster for the 1972 Summit Series against the Soviet Union. Designated as a reserve, he played in an exhibition game against Sweden, but did not compete in the main series.

Following his third season with Vancouver, in which he scored 13 goals and 37 points, he was traded to the Chicago Black Hawks on May 14, 1973, in exchange for Gary Smith and Jerry Korab. Tallon was widely seen as a replacement for Bobby Hull, whom the Black Hawks had lost to the World Hockey Association that offseason; he was even given Hull's old number 9. In his first preseason game, fans, still upset over losing Hull to the WHA, booed Tallon relentlessly, prompting the Black Hawks to assign him another number almost immediately. His best season in Chicago was in 1975–76, when he scored 15 goals and had a team-high and career-high 47 assists. In five seasons with the Black Hawks, he scored 44 goals and 112 assists for 156 points.

On October 9, 1978, Tallon was traded to the Pittsburgh Penguins for a second-round choice in the 1980 NHL entry draft. He played two seasons with the Penguins, scoring 10 goals with 33 assists, before retiring.

In his ten-season NHL career, Tallon scored 98 goals and had 238 assists for 336 points in 642 games played.

== Broadcasting career ==
Following his retirement as a player, Tallon returned to the Blackhawks franchise as a broadcaster. He went on to spend 16 seasons as an analyst for Blackhawks radio and television broadcasts. Tallon also served the same role in the 2002–03 NHL season between his two stints in the Blackhawks' front office.

== Front office ==
=== Chicago Blackhawks ===
In 1998, Tallon joined the Blackhawks front office as director of player personnel, a position he held until 2002. After then serving as assistant general manager, beginning on November 5, 2003, he was named the Blackhawks' eighth general manager in team history on June 21, 2005, succeeding Bob Pulford.

Tallon's first season as the Blackhawks general manager was a busy one. The 2004–05 NHL season was lost to a labor dispute, and the new collective bargaining agreement between the owners and players was signed in July 2005. Between the new financial structure and many rules changes intended to produce a higher scoring game, Tallon was challenged to build a new team. Tallon signed many free agents, including goaltender Nikolai Khabibulin, defenceman Adrian Aucoin, and forward Martin Lapointe, which led to raised expectations. The Blackhawks finished Tallon's first season with 26 wins, 43 losses and 13 overtime losses for 65 points, ranking the Blackhawks 14th in the 15-team Western Conference, and with the third-fewest points in the NHL.

Under Tallon, however, the Blackhawks steadily improved, raising their points totals to 71 and 88 in the next two years. Though not enough to make the playoffs either year, their poor overall standing allowed Tallon high draft picks to work with. In 2006, he selected Jonathan Toews third overall, then Patrick Kane first overall the following year. The two forwards went on to quickly become franchise cornerstones and were joined by fellow young talents Patrick Sharp, Kris Versteeg, Martin Havlát and Brian Campbell, all of whom Tallon either signed or traded for.

With a new core of players in 2008–09, the Blackhawks finished the season with a 46–24–12 record for 104 points. Ranking fourth overall in the Western Conference, the team qualified for the playoffs for the first time since 2002. Chicago made it to the Western Conference Finals, where they were eliminated in five games by the Detroit Red Wings.

Tallon further bolstered his team in the off-season by signing star winger Marián Hossa and Selke Trophy-winning John Madden. That same off-season, however, Tallon and the Blackhawks management came under fire in early July 2009, when the National Hockey League Players' Association (NHLPA) claimed the team did not submit qualifying offers to their restricted free agents before the deadline. In the worst-case scenario, the team's unsigned restricted free agents at the time, including Kris Versteeg, would have become unrestricted, earning them additional salary and negotiating rights. Tallon was able to sign all his restricted free agents, although at a cost of millions more than he would have to had he qualified them in time.

Soon thereafter, on July 14, 2009, the Blackhawks demoted Tallon to the position of senior advisor, while Stan Bowman, son of Scotty Bowman, was promoted to general manager. The following day, Martin Havlát, who was no longer a Blackhawk, criticized the team's management and defended Tallon. He stated, "Every single player on that team is with Dale. I still talk to the guys all the time, hockey players know a phony when they see one." He specifically berated John McDonough, the team's president, commenting, "McDonough couldn't stand that Dale was so successful and getting the credit for building the Blackhawks from a last place team to making the Conference Finals in three short years." One journalist later referred the move as an "opportunistic off-ice power play".

The Blackhawks won the Stanley Cup in June 2010, giving Tallon his first championship. Tallon's name was engraved on the Cup and the team issued him a Stanley Cup ring.

=== Florida Panthers ===
After serving as a senior advisor with the Blackhawks for nearly a year, Tallon was hired on May 17, 2010, by the Florida Panthers as general manager, replacing Randy Sexton. The Panthers had finished last in their division, the Southeast, the previous season and had not made the playoffs since 2000. Seeking a rebuilding process similar to that which he accomplished in Chicago, Tallon immediately began trading away several players, most notably forward Nathan Horton and defenceman Keith Ballard.

In his first season as general manager, the Panthers finished last in their division for the second straight year, prompting Tallon to fire head coach Peter DeBoer (later replacing him with former NHL player Kevin Dineen) and to continue trading for younger players and draft picks. At the NHL trade deadline, he dealt away captain Bryan McCabe, as well as veterans Cory Stillman, Radek Dvořák and Chris Higgins. In the off-season, he acquired three former Chicago players — Brian Campbell, Tomáš Kopecký and Kris Versteeg — while also signing Tomáš Fleischmann and former Panthers fan favourite Ed Jovanovski.

Tallon's personnel changes helped lead the Panthers to their first Southeast Division title in franchise history, improving by 22 points in the 2011–12 season. Qualifying for the 2012 playoffs as the third seed, they were eliminated in the first round by the eventual 2012 Stanley Cup finalists New Jersey Devils, ironically led by former Panthers head coach, Peter DeBoer. As a result of his leading the team to their first playoff appearance in 12 years, Tallon was nominated for the 2012 NHL General Manager of the Year Award. He signed a contract extension on June 6, 2012. On January 1, 2016, the Panthers gave Tallon a new three-year contract extension. The Panthers promoted Tallon to an executive position within their organization.

The Panthers posted a 47–26–9 in 2015–16, but were eliminated from the playoffs in the first round by the New York Islanders in six games. The team began the 2016–17 in last place in the Atlantic Division with an 11–10–1 record. On November 28, 2016, the Panthers fired head coach Gerard Gallant and moved general manager Tom Rowe to fill the vacancy. Darren Dreger of TSN reported that Tallon would return to "taking a day-to-day management and player management player personnel decisions." However, Vincent Viola, the team's owner, refuted Dreger's report of organizational changes, and clarified that "[Tallon] has always had final say over hockey decisions." He added, "What we had done is bifurcate Dale from some things he didn't need to worry about anymore [negotiating contracts, for example]."

On April 10, 2017, the Panthers announced that Tallon would return as the general manager after his successor Rowe was demoted from the role.

On August 10, 2020, Tallon and the Panthers mutually agreed to part ways.

=== Vancouver Canucks ===
On June 24, 2022, the Vancouver Canucks hired Tallon as a senior advisor and professional scout.

== Golfing career ==
In addition to hockey, Tallon was an avid golfer growing up. As a teenager, Tallon's father wanted him to be a hockey player, while his mother aspired for a golfing scholarship at an American college. After winning the 1969 Canadian Junior Golf Championship, he went on to qualify for the Canadian PGA Tour two years later. He was formerly the head professional at Highland Park Country Club in Chicagoland and the Tamarack Golf Club in Naperville, Illinois.

== Awards ==
- 1971 – played in NHL All-Star Game
- 1972 – played in NHL All-Star Game
- 2010 – Stanley Cup champion (as assistant general manager)

== Career statistics ==
			Regular season					Playoffs
Season	Team	League	GP	G	A	Pts	PIM	GP	G	A	Pts	PIM
1967–68	Oshawa Generals	OHA-Jr.	50	12	31	43	88	—	—	—	—	—
1968–69	Toronto Marlboros	OHA-Jr.	48	17	32	49	80	6	6	2	8	8
1969–70	Toronto Marlboros	OHA-Jr.	54	39	40	79	128	18	12	17	29	13
1970–71	Vancouver Canucks	NHL	78	14	42	56	58	—	—	—	—	—
1971–72	Vancouver Canucks	NHL	69	17	27	44	78	—	—	—	—	—
1972–73	Vancouver Canucks	NHL	75	13	24	37	83	—	—	—	—	—
1973–74	Chicago Black Hawks	NHL	65	15	19	34	36	11	1	3	4	29
1974–75	Dallas Black Hawks	CHL	7	1	4	5	14	—	—	—	—	—
1974–75	Chicago Black Hawks	NHL	35	5	10	15	28	8	1	3	4	4
1975–76	Chicago Black Hawks	NHL	80	15	47	62	101	4	0	1	1	8
1976–77	Chicago Black Hawks	NHL	70	5	16	21	65	2	0	1	1	0
1977–78	Chicago Black Hawks	NHL	75	4	20	24	66	4	0	2	2	0
1978–79	Pittsburgh Penguins	NHL	63	5	24	29	35	—	—	—	—	—
1979–80	Syracuse Firebirds	AHL	6	0	1	1	4	—	—	—	—	—
1979–80	Pittsburgh Penguins	NHL	32	5	9	14	18	4	0	0	0	4
NHL totals			642	98	238	336	568	33	2	10	12	45

Preceded by None	Vancouver Canucks first-round draft pick 1970	Succeeded by Jocelyn Guevremont
Preceded by Bob Pulford	General manager of the Chicago Blackhawks; 2005–2009	Succeeded by Stan Bowman
Preceded by Randy Sexton	General manager of the Florida Panthers; 2010–2016	Succeeded by Tom Rowe
Preceded by Tom Rowe	General manager of the Florida Panthers; 2017–2020	Succeeded by Bill Zito
