= List of Florida Panthers general managers =

The Florida Panthers are a professional ice hockey team based in Sunrise, Florida, United States. The Panthers are members of the Atlantic Division of the Eastern Conference in the National Hockey League (NHL). The team was founded as an expansion franchise on December 10, 1992. The team has had ten general managers since their inception.

== Key ==
Key of terms and definitions
Term	Definition
No.	Number of general managers^{[a]}
Ref(s)	References
–	Does not apply
†	Elected to the Hockey Hall of Fame in the Builder category

== General managers ==
General Managers of the Florida Panthers
No.	Name	Tenure	Accomplishments during this term	Ref(s)
1	Bobby Clarke	March 1, 1993 – June 15, 1994	No playoff appearances	
2	Bryan Murray	August 1, 1994 – December 28, 2000	1 Stanley Cup Final appearance (1996); 1 conference title and 3 playoff appearances	
3	Bill Torrey†	December 28, 2000 – December 3, 2001	No playoff appearances	
4	Chuck Fletcher (Interim)	December 3, 2001 – May 10, 2002	No playoff appearances	
5	Rick Dudley	May 10, 2002 – May 24, 2004	No playoff appearances	
6	Mike Keenan	May 26, 2004 – September 3, 2006	No playoff appearances	
7	Jacques Martin	September 3, 2006 – June 1, 2009	No playoff appearances	
8	Randy Sexton	October 2, 2009 – May 17, 2010	No playoff appearances	
9	Dale Tallon	May 17, 2010 – May 16, 2016	2 division titles and 2 playoff appearances	
10	Tom Rowe	May 16, 2016 – April 10, 2017	No playoff appearances	
–	Dale Tallon	April 10, 2017 – August 10, 2020	1 playoff appearance	
11	Bill Zito	September 2, 2020 – present	2 Stanley Cups (2024, 2025); 3 Stanley Cup Final appearances (2023, 2024, 2025); 3 conference titles, 2 division titles, and 5 playoff appearances; Presidents’ Trophy (2022)	

== See also ==
- List of NHL general managers

== Notes ==
- ^{a} A running total of the number of general managers of the franchise. Thus any general manager who has two or more separate terms as general manager is only counted once.
