= Florida Panthers =

National Hockey League team in Sunrise, Florida

- 2026–27 Florida Panthers season
- Conference: Eastern
- Division: Atlantic
- Founded: 1993
- History: Florida Panthers; 1993–present
- Home arena: Amerant Bank Arena
- City: Sunrise, Florida
- Team colors: Red, blue, flat gold, white
- Media: Scripps Sports (WSFL-TV); WQAM Sports Radio (560 AM)
- Owner(s): Sunrise Sports & Entertainment (Vincent Viola, chairman)
- General manager: Bill Zito
- Head coach: Paul Maurice
- Captain: Aleksander Barkov
- Minor league affiliates: Charlotte Checkers (AHL); Savannah Ghost Pirates (ECHL)
- Stanley Cups: 2 (2023–24, 2024–25)
- Conference championships: 4 (1995–96, 2022–23, 2023–24, 2024–25)
- Presidents' Trophies: 1 (2021–22)
- Division championships: 4 (2011–12, 2015–16, 2021–22, 2023–24)
- Official website: nhl.com/panthers

The Florida Panthers are a professional ice hockey team based in the Miami metropolitan area. The Panthers compete in the National Hockey League (NHL) as a member of the Atlantic Division in the Eastern Conference. The team initially played its home games at Miami Arena before moving to what is now known as Amerant Bank Arena in 1998. Located in Sunrise, Florida, the franchise is the southernmost team in the NHL. The Panthers are one of two NHL franchises based in Florida, with the other being the Tampa Bay Lightning.

The team's local broadcasting rights were held by Bally Sports Florida (formerly SportsChannel and Fox Sports Florida) from 1996 to 2024 when they made a new broadcast deal with Scripps Sports. The Panthers are primarily affiliated with two minor league teams: the Charlotte Checkers of the American Hockey League (AHL) and the Savannah Ghost Pirates of the ECHL.

The Panthers began playing in the 1993–94 season, when they set the record for the most points by an expansion team in its inaugural season, which was later surpassed by the Vegas Golden Knights in 2017–18. In 1996, the team made their first appearance in the Stanley Cup playoffs, reaching the 1996 Stanley Cup Final before falling to the Colorado Avalanche. Between 1997 and 2021, the Panthers only qualified for the Stanley Cup playoffs six times, not winning a playoff series in that span.

Since the 2021–22 season, the Panthers have found considerable postseason success. They won their first playoff series in two decades in 2022, and appeared in the Stanley Cup Final for three straight seasons from 2023 to 2025, winning their first Stanley Cup in franchise history in 2024, and repeating as champions in 2025.

== History ==
=== Early years (1992–2000) ===
Blockbuster Video magnate Wayne Huizenga was awarded an NHL franchise for Miami on December 10, 1992, the same day the Walt Disney Company earned the rights to start a team in Anaheim that would become the Mighty Ducks. At the time, Huizenga owned both the newly founded Florida Marlins of Major League Baseball (MLB) and a share of the National Football League (NFL)'s Miami Dolphins. The entry fee was $50 million. Huizenga announced the team would play at the Miami Arena, sharing the building with the National Basketball Association (NBA)'s Miami Heat, until a new arena was built. Offices for the team were only established in June 1993, while vice president of business operations Dean Jordan conceded that "none of the business people, myself included, knew anything about hockey." The new franchise would be the first professional ice hockey team in Miami since the folding of the Tropical Hockey League in 1939.

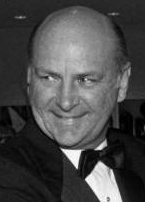
Wayne Huizenga was awarded a franchise from the NHL on December 10, 1992.

Huizenga initially wanted to name the team the "Block Busters" in honor of his video rental chain. The team would have the same colors as the video rental chain (blue and gold) and even a uniform concept was designed. In the end, the NHL rejected the nickname.

On April 20, 1993, a press conference in Fort Lauderdale announced that the team would be named Florida Panthers, with former New York Islanders general manager Bill Torrey as president and Bobby Clarke as general manager. The team is named for the Florida panther, an endangered species of large cat endemic to the nearby Everglades region. Once the logos and uniforms were unveiled on June 15, the team also announced its financial commitment to the panther preservation cause. Huizenga had held the Panthers trademark since 1991, when he purchased it from a group of Tampa investors who sought to create an MLB team in the Tampa Bay area.

The new franchise joined the NHL for participation in the 1993–94 season, along with the Mighty Ducks of Anaheim. The Panthers' and Ducks' rosters were filled in both the expansion draft and the 1993 NHL entry draft in June 1993, hosted by Quebec City; that draft produced ten players who would eventually be a part of the 1996 Eastern Conference-winning team.

The Panthers' first major stars were former New York Rangers goaltender John Vanbiesbrouck, rookie Rob Niedermayer and forward Scott Mellanby, who scored 30 goals in Florida's inaugural season. Their first game was a 4–4 tie on the road against the Chicago Blackhawks, while their first win was a 2–0 shutout of the Tampa Bay Lightning in the Thunderdome before a then-NHL record crowd of 27,227. The Panthers had one of the most successful first seasons of any expansion team in league history, finishing just two points below .500 and narrowly missing out on the final 1994 playoff spot in the Eastern Conference. Their first-year success was attributed mainly to the trap defense that first-year coach Roger Neilson implemented. This conservative style was widely criticized by NHL teams; some even suggested that the Panthers were ruining the game. While the team executives expected the audience to consist of mostly "snowbird" Canadians living in Florida, the Floridians soon embraced the Panthers. Helped by Miami's other teams having middling performances, the club averaged 94% capacity at the 14,500-seat Miami Arena, and sold 8,500 season tickets in 100 days.

In August 1994, general manager Clarke left to work for the Philadelphia Flyers; Bryan Murray was brought in from the Detroit Red Wings as his replacement. After another close brush with the playoffs, finishing the lockout-shortened 1994–95 season again in ninth, Neilson was fired following an argument with Murray regarding Ed Jovanovski, whom the Panthers chose as the number one overall pick at the 1994 NHL entry draft. Doug MacLean, who had been the team's player development director, was promoted to coach. The team then acquired Ray Sheppard from the San Jose Sharks at the NHL trade deadline and looked toward the playoffs for the first time.

==== The Rat Trick and a trip to the 1996 Stanley Cup Final ====
A very unusual goal celebration developed in Miami during the 1995–96 season. On the night of the Panthers' 1995–96 home opener, a rat scurried across the team's locker room. Scott Mellanby reacted by "one-timing" the rat against the wall, killing it. That night, he scored two goals, which Vanbiesbrouck quipped was "a rat trick". Two nights later, as the story found its way into the world, a few fans threw rubber rats on the ice in celebration of a goal. The rubber rat count went from 16 for the third home game to over 2,000 during the playoffs.

In the 1996 playoffs, as the fourth seed in the Eastern Conference, the Panthers faced the Boston Bruins in the first round and won in five games. Bill Lindsay's series-clinching goal is still a trademark image for the run the third-year franchise went on. The Panthers went on to upset the top-seeded Philadelphia Flyers in six games followed by the second-seeded Pittsburgh Penguins in seven (with Tom Fitzgerald scoring what would end up being the game-winning goal) to reach the 1996 Stanley Cup Final against the Colorado Avalanche, another team making its first Stanley Cup Final appearance. The Avalanche, however, swept the Panthers in four games. Despite losing in the Cup Final series, the Panthers set a record for most wins by an expansion team in their first postseason appearance with 12 victories (this record would later be broken by the Vegas Golden Knights during their inaugural season in 2017–18). For his team's surprising success, Bryan Murray was honored as NHL Executive of the Year.

The Panthers began the next season with a 12-game unbeaten streak, but faded in the second half of the season after trading second line center Stu Barnes. They lost in five games in the first round of the playoffs to the Wayne Gretzky-led New York Rangers. The team would plummet in the 1997–98 season. After a 7–12–4 start, the Panthers fired Doug MacLean, replacing him for the season with general manager Bryan Murray. The change did not aid matters, as Florida posted a franchise-worst 24–43–15 record, including a 15-game winless streak. This season also marked the end of goaltender John Vanbiesbrouck's time in Florida; in the midst of that streak, he was shelled by the Chicago Blackhawks and never played another game for the Panthers. In the following off-season, Vanbiesbrouck signed with the Flyers as a free agent.

=== New arena and a decade of struggles (1998–2010) ===
The Panthers moved into the brand new National Car Rental Center (now known as Amerant Bank Arena) in 1998. In 1998–99, they acquired Pavel Bure (the "Russian Rocket"), in a blockbuster trade with the Vancouver Canucks. They then reached the playoffs again in 1999–2000, losing in a first round sweep to the eventual Stanley Cup champion New Jersey Devils. The team slumped in 2000–01. Afterward, Huizenga sold the Panthers to an ownership group led by Alan Cohen. The following season, 2001–02, the Panthers had their worst record ever. Bure struggled despite being reunited with his brother Valeri, and was traded to the Rangers at the 2002 trade deadline.

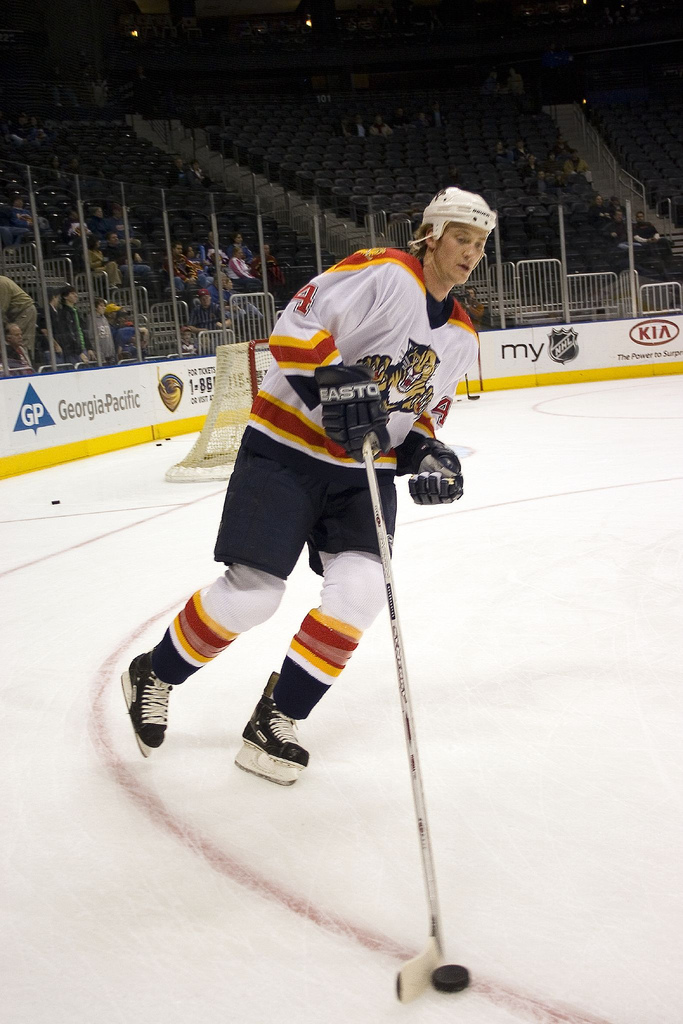
The Panthers drafted Jay Bouwmeester third overall in the 2002 NHL entry draft.

The Panthers then began eyeing defenseman Jay Bouwmeester, who was widely tipped to be picked first overall pick at the 2002 NHL entry draft. However, then-general manager Rick Dudley sent Florida's first pick to the Columbus Blue Jackets, who selected winger Rick Nash, and in return, the Panthers received the right to trade first-round selections with the Blue Jackets in the 2003 NHL entry draft, a right which was not exercised when the Panthers received the first overall selection in 2003 as well. The Atlanta Thrashers, after picking goaltender Kari Lehtonen second overall, announced that the Panthers had given them two draft picks to guarantee that Bouwmeester would still be available for Florida's selection. Bouwmeester was selected third overall by the Panthers. Said then-head coach Mike Keenan, "We shouldn't have done that ... Jay would have been number-one if we'd kept that pick."

In 2003, the Panthers hosted the NHL All-Star weekend in which the Western Conference earned a 6–5 victory after the first overtime shootout in All-Star history. The West overcame a four-goal outburst by Thrashers winger Dany Heatley, who took home MVP honors in his first All-Star appearance.

On June 23, 2006, the Panthers were again involved in a blockbuster trade with Vancouver, sending Roberto Luongo, Lukáš Krajíček and a sixth-round draft pick (Sergei Shirokov) in exchange for Todd Bertuzzi, Alex Auld and Bryan Allen. This trade has been regarded by some as one of the worst trades in professional sports history – Luongo, who was at the prime of his career, was one of the League's top goaltenders, while Bertuzzi played just a handful of games for Florida before getting injured. He would later be traded to Detroit Red Wings at the trade deadline for Shawn Matthias. Additionally, Auld ended up a poor replacement for Luongo, and was ultimately let go after one season with the team.

On June 22, 2007, the Panthers were involved in yet another draft-day deal involving a goaltender. The team acquired Tomáš Vokoun from the Nashville Predators in exchange for three draft picks – a first-round pick in 2008, a second-round pick in 2008 and a conditional second-round pick that could be used in 2007 or 2008. The move would eventually pay off when Vokoun was selected to the Eastern Conference All-Star Team. On July 28, 2007, Florida unveiled their new jerseys to over 11,000 fans at the BankAtlantic Center during the first intermission of the Panthers' 1996 Reunion game. Star forwards Nathan Horton and Stephen Weiss were both in full gear to help showcase the sweater changes.

In June 2008, the Panthers traded their captain Olli Jokinen to the Phoenix Coyotes for a second-round draft pick and defensemen Keith Ballard and Nick Boynton. The Panthers finished the 2008–09 season with a strong 41–30–11 record and 93 points, their second-highest finish in franchise history. Despite this, however, the Panthers missed the playoffs for an eighth-straight season, the then-longest streak in the NHL.

In November 2009, Cliff Viner and Stu Siegel became the new majority owners. On November 23, 2009, the Panthers made their third jersey, ridding red from the alternate jersey, replacing it with powder blue. The Panthers missed the playoffs for the ninth consecutive time in the 2009–10 season, making them the first team in NHL history to do so in one city.

=== Dale Tallon era (2010–2020) ===
==== The Blueprint (2010–2016) ====
Panthers management hired Dale Tallon as the team's new general manager on May 17, 2010, replacing Randy Sexton, whose contract was expiring at the end of June. Tallon rebuilt the team with 2010 draft picks Erik Gudbranson, Nick Bjugstad and Quinton Howden, as well as the acquisition of players, including Steve Bernier, Michael Grabner, Marty Reasoner, Ryan Carter and Sergei Samsonov. All of the above-mentioned players, however, were traded at the 2011 trade deadline or released during the 2011 off-season, save for Gudbranson, Bjugstad and Howden. At the end of the 2010–11 season, just Stephen Weiss and David Booth remained from the pre-lockout era Panthers roster.

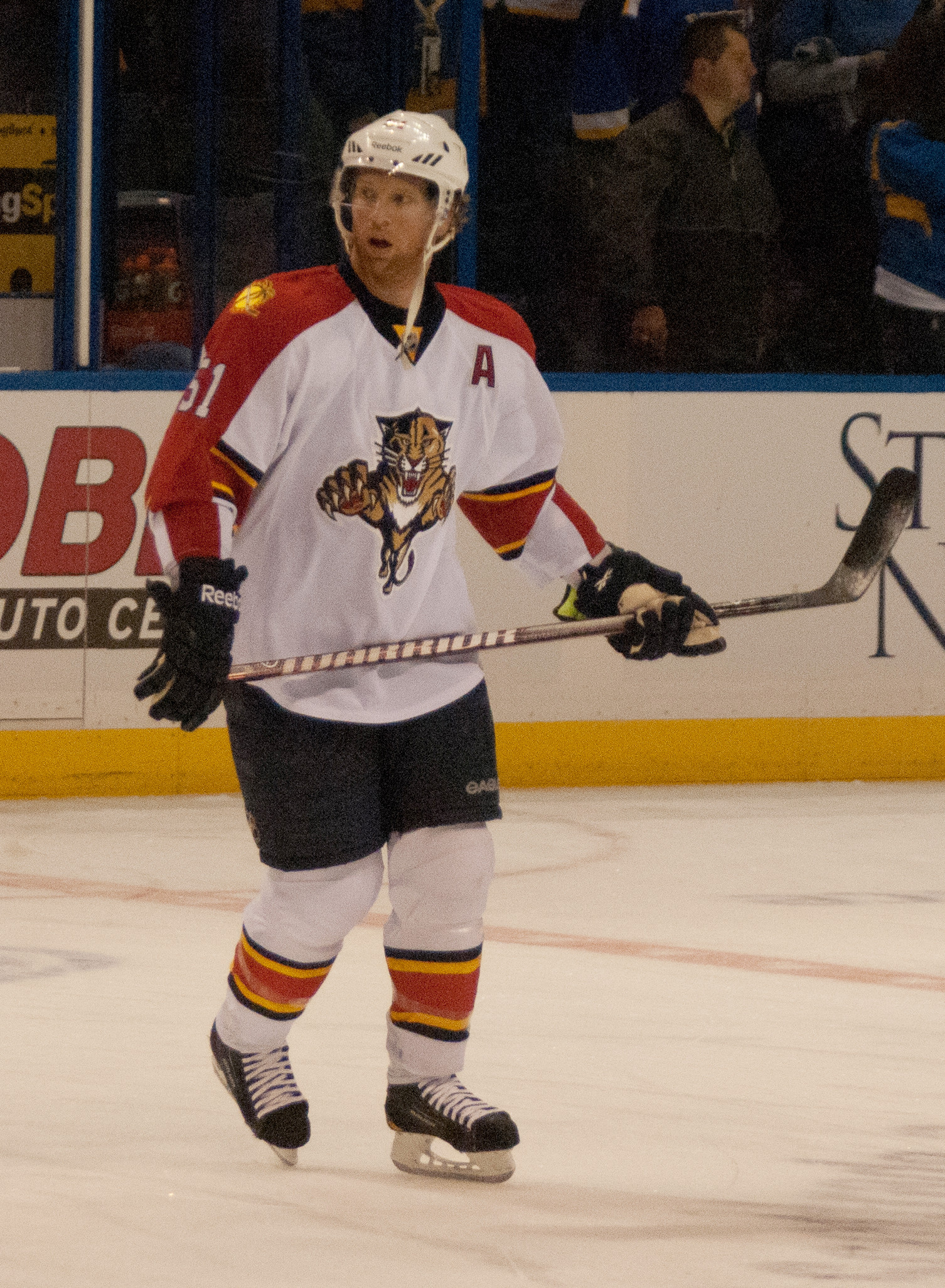
The Panthers acquired Brian Campbell during the 2011 off-season. Campbell played with the Panthers from 2011 to 2016.

On June 1, 2011, Kevin Dineen, head coach of the American Hockey League (AHL)'s Portland Pirates, was named to be the 11th head coach of the Panthers. The team also rebranded their image, releasing a new home jersey, predominantly red with navy blue sleeves, and eliminating the navy blue piping on the road jersey; this new jersey replaced the navy blue one as the main home jersey. The 2011 off-season saw the acquisitions of Scottie Upshall, Tomáš Fleischmann, Sean Bergenheim, Marcel Goc, Matt Bradley, Ed Jovanovski, José Théodore, Kris Versteeg, Tomáš Kopecký and Brian Campbell.

After several more trades and over 300-man-games lost to injury throughout the season, the Panthers were able to finish first in the Southeast Division, marking the end of their record-setting decade-long postseason drought. The Panthers won the first-ever division title in franchise history with a 4–1 victory over the Carolina Hurricanes on April 7, 2012. However, the Panthers were eliminated in the first round of the playoffs by the eventual Eastern Conference champion New Jersey Devils, losing at home in double overtime of game 7.

In the lockout-shortened 2012–13 season, the Panthers had an abysmal season. Unable to regain their form from last season, the Panthers suffered key injuries and fell back down into the basement with the worst record in the League. In the 2013–14 season, the Panthers failed to gain any momentum and finished 29th out of 30 teams. The team then fired head coach Kevin Dineen and replaced him with Peter Horachek. At the trade deadline, the Panthers reacquired Roberto Luongo from Vancouver. The Panthers would relieve Horachek of his duties at the end of the season, replacing him with former Columbus Blue Jackets head coach Gerard Gallant. The team also received the first overall pick in the 2014 NHL entry draft, using it to select Barrie Colts defenseman Aaron Ekblad.

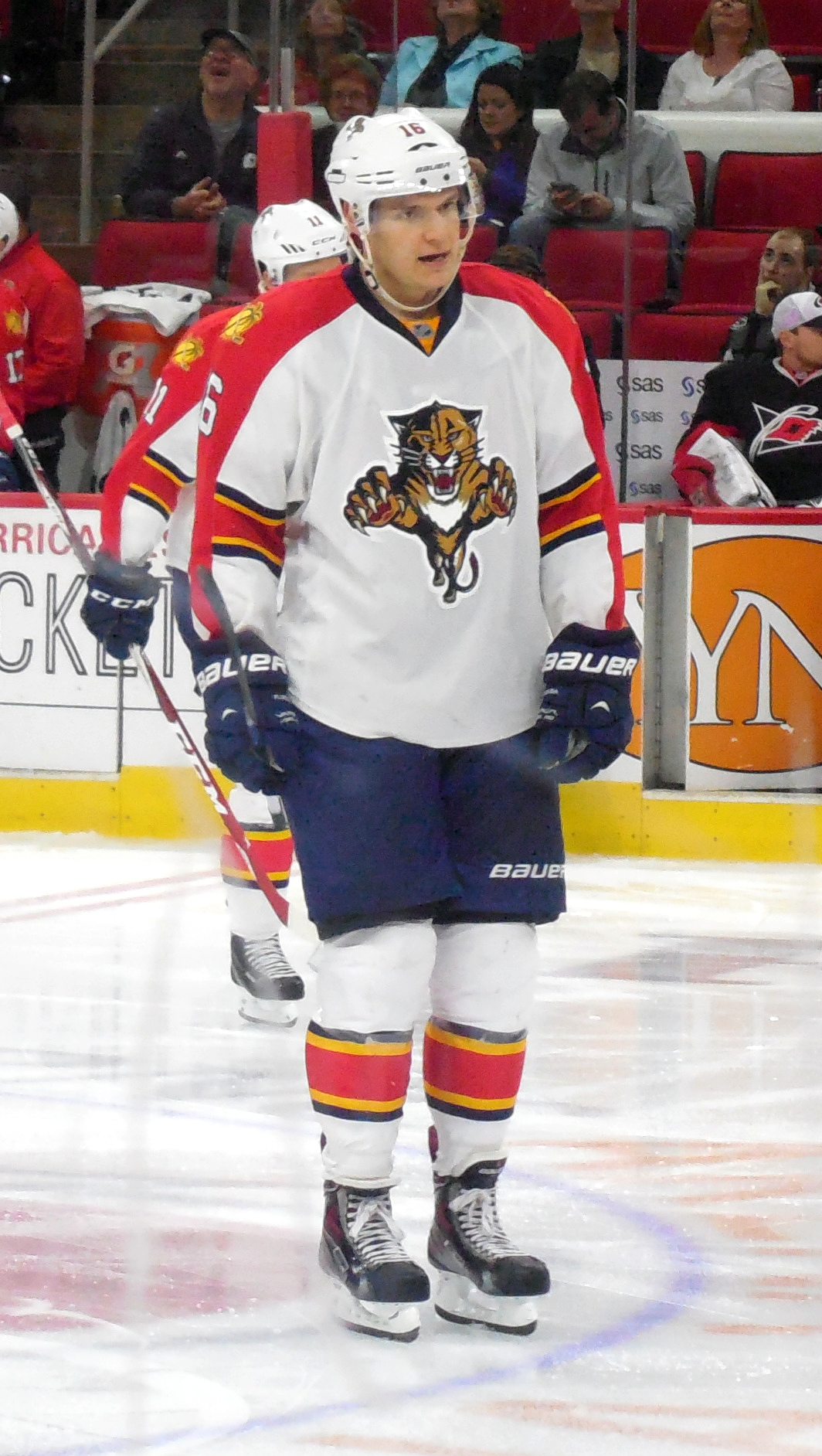
Aleksander Barkov, drafted second overall by the Panthers in 2013, would emerge as the franchise's captain and star during the late-2010s.

The Panthers' 2014–15 home opener on October 12, 2014, set a team record for the lowest attendance at a home opener, with only 11,419 spectators in attendance. The team's next game against the Ottawa Senators marked the team's lowest attendance ever, with only 7,311 in attendance. Despite finishing with a record of 38–29–15, the Panthers missed the 2015 playoffs by seven points.

On December 8, 2015, the Panthers announced that they signed a 13-year lease, and an $86 million funding agreement with Broward County and would have a new logo and uniforms after the 2015–16 season. Their original logo had remained almost unchanged since their first season in 1993.

In the 2015–16 season, the team set a franchise record with a 12-game win streak. They also set a franchise record for most wins in a regular season with 47 wins and won their division for the second time in their existence. However, the Panthers lost to the New York Islanders in six games in the first round of the playoffs; this would be the first playoff series win for the Islanders since the 1992–93 season. Head coach Gerard Gallant was nominated as a finalist for the Jack Adams Award, which recognizes the NHL Coach of the Year.

==== Front office miscues (2016–2020) ====
The 2016–17 season began with the promotion of general manager Dale Tallon to an executive position within the organization and assistant general manager Tom Rowe was promoted to general manager. After an 11–10–1 start to the season, the Panthers fired head coach Gerard Gallant and general manager Tom Rowe took over as interim head coach. At the end of the season, Rowe was relieved of his duties as both coach and general manager and was named special advisor to Tallon, who returned to positions of team president and general manager. On June 12, 2017, the Panthers named Bob Boughner as their new head coach.

In the 2017 NHL expansion draft, the Panthers left Jonathan Marchessault and Reilly Smith unprotected, despite the fact they both had 30-goal seasons on their resumes. In return for the unprotected players, the Vegas Golden Knights sent the Panthers a 2018 fourth-round draft pick, leaving the Panthers with the extra salary cap space. The Panthers instead chose to protect Nick Bjugstad, Mark Pysyk, and Alex Petrovic who all were eventually traded or no longer on the team within the next two years. The expansion draft would later haunt the Panthers in the 2023 Stanley Cup Final as the Vegas Golden Knights would defeat the Panthers in five games with Marchessault winning the Conn Smythe Trophy and Smith scoring the series-clinching goal.

The 2017–18 season began with a 19–22–6 record leading up to the 2018 NHL All-Star Game. The Panthers then went on a 25–8–2 run in their last 35 games, ending up one point short of a playoff berth. Their 44–30–8 record earned 96 regular season points, tying the league record of the 2014–15 Boston Bruins and the 2018–19 Montreal Canadiens for the team with the most regular season points to miss the postseason.

On April 7, 2019, the Panthers fired Boughner after the team failed to qualify for the playoffs for the third straight season. The next day, Joel Quenneville was named the 16th head coach of the Panthers. Longtime goaltender Roberto Luongo retired at the conclusion of the 2018–19 season. Tallon made a splash on the first day of free agency to replace the retired Luongo and signed two-time Vezina Trophy-winning goaltender Sergei Bobrovsky to a seven-year deal. At the time of the signing, Bobrovsky's contract was deemed a risk and gamble due to the contract value, Bobrovsky's inconsistent play, and his age.

On August 10, 2020, after nine years as general manager, the Panthers and Tallon mutually agreed to part ways, following the team's elimination in the 2020 Stanley Cup playoffs. In Tallon's tenure, the Panthers qualified for the Stanley Cup playoffs three times, in 2012, 2016, and 2020 with the Panthers never advancing past the first round, leaving the Panthers without a playoff series win since 1996.

=== Arrival of Bill Zito and Stanley Cup champions (2020–present) ===
==== 2020–2022: Presidents' Trophy and return to playoffs ====
Panthers management hired Bill Zito to succeed Tallon as the team's general manager on September 2, 2020. During the shortened 2020–21 season, the Panthers compiled 79 points in 56 games played, finishing the season in second place in the temporary Central Division, one point behind the Carolina Hurricanes. As such, they were pitted against division and statewide rival, the Tampa Bay Lightning, in the first round of the 2021 playoffs. They were defeated in six games by the eventual Stanley Cup champions, for yet another first round exit.

In the 2021–22 season, Quenneville led the Panthers to a 7–0–0 record through the team's first seven games, but he would resign from his coaching duties as a result of the fallout from the 2010 Chicago Blackhawks sexual assault scandal on October 28, 2021. The next day, the Panthers named former NHL player Andrew Brunette their interim head coach. On April 3, 2022, the Panthers became the first team during the 2021–22 season to clinch a playoff berth, when they defeated the Buffalo Sabres at home, 5–3. This victory was also Florida's 48th of the season, breaking their previous record set during 2015–16 season. Three weeks later, on April 21, 2022, following a 5–2 victory over the Detroit Red Wings, the Panthers crowned themselves as Atlantic Division champions for the first time since the 2015–16 season. The victory was also Florida's 12th consecutive, dating back to a 7–4 win over the Montreal Canadiens on March 29. This win streak matched another one achieved during the 2015–16 season, tying the franchise record. With the win, the Panthers improved to a stellar 56–15–6 record, tallying 118 points, and overcoming the Colorado Avalanche in the quest for the Presidents' Trophy. After an Avalanche defeat, and a Panthers 4–0 victory over the Ottawa Senators on April 28, the Panthers clinched the Presidents' Trophy for the first time in franchise history. They would end the regular season with 122 points, with a 58–18–6 record, the best record registered in the league since division rivals Tampa Bay Lightning in 2018–19. On May 13, the Panthers advanced past the first round for the first time in 26 years, dating back to the 1996 conference finals, by beating the Washington Capitals in six games, eliminating them with a 4–3 overtime victory. However, the Panthers were swept in four games by the archrival the Tampa Bay Lightning in the second round. Florida went completely dry offensively, scoring only three goals throughout the whole four-game series.

==== 2022–present: Three consecutive Stanley Cup Final series, back-to-back championships and the arrival of Brady Tkachuk ====
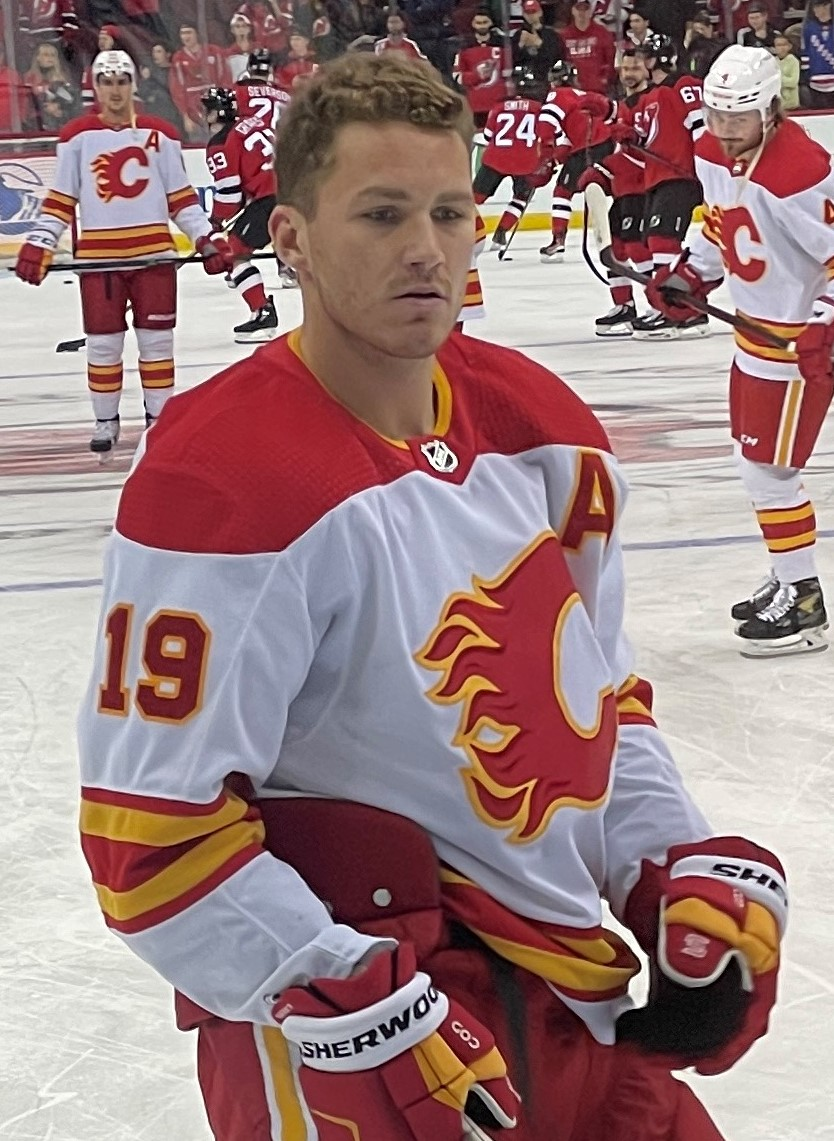
Forward Matthew Tkachuk, pictured with the Calgary Flames.

After being swept in the second round by the Lightning, interim head coach Andrew Brunette was let go. On June 22, 2022, the Panthers hired Paul Maurice to be the franchise's 18th head coach. Later that same off-season, the Panthers traded away Hart Memorial Trophy nominee forward Jonathan Huberdeau, defenseman MacKenzie Weegar, a first-round pick, and prospect Cole Schwindt to the Calgary Flames in exchange for forward Matthew Tkachuk and a mid-round draft pick. The Tkachuk–Hubderdeau trade saw two 100-point NHL scorers traded for each other for the first time since 1988, when Wayne Gretzky was traded for Jimmy Carson. This trade was also the first sign-and-trade in NHL history as Tkachuk was a restricted free agent at the time.

For the 2022–23 season, the Panthers looked to carry on their positive regular season streak. However, the team struggled under the new system of Paul Maurice. Despite being outside of playoff contention by February 2023, the Panthers slowly gained momentum, aided by Barkov's return, and eventually finished the season with a 42–32–8 record, good enough for 92 points and the second wild card spot and eighth seed in the Eastern Conference overall, one point ahead of the Pittsburgh Penguins and Buffalo Sabres. As such, they were set to battle the record-breaking, 135-point Boston Bruins in the 2023 first round. As the heavy underdogs in the series, the Panthers were down 3–1 after losing game 4 at home. However, they won game 5 in overtime at the TD Garden, and game 6 at home to tie the series at 3. In the definitive game 7, the Panthers led 2–0 after the second period, but were down 3–2 with under two minutes left in the third period, facing elimination. However, Brandon Montour scored with under a minute left to play to send the game to overtime. In overtime, Carter Verhaeghe scored to win the game 4–3 and stun the Bruins, setting up a second round matchup against the Toronto Maple Leafs. In the second round, the Panthers defeated the Maple Leafs in five games. The Panthers played their longest game in franchise history on May 18, against the Carolina Hurricanes in the conference finals, which resulted in a 3–2 Panthers victory with Matthew Tkachuk scoring the game-winning goal with 12.7 seconds left in quadruple overtime. The Panthers then swept the Hurricanes in four games, the first time the Panthers had ever swept a playoff series. They advanced to the 2023 Stanley Cup Final, where they lost to the Vegas Golden Knights in five games.

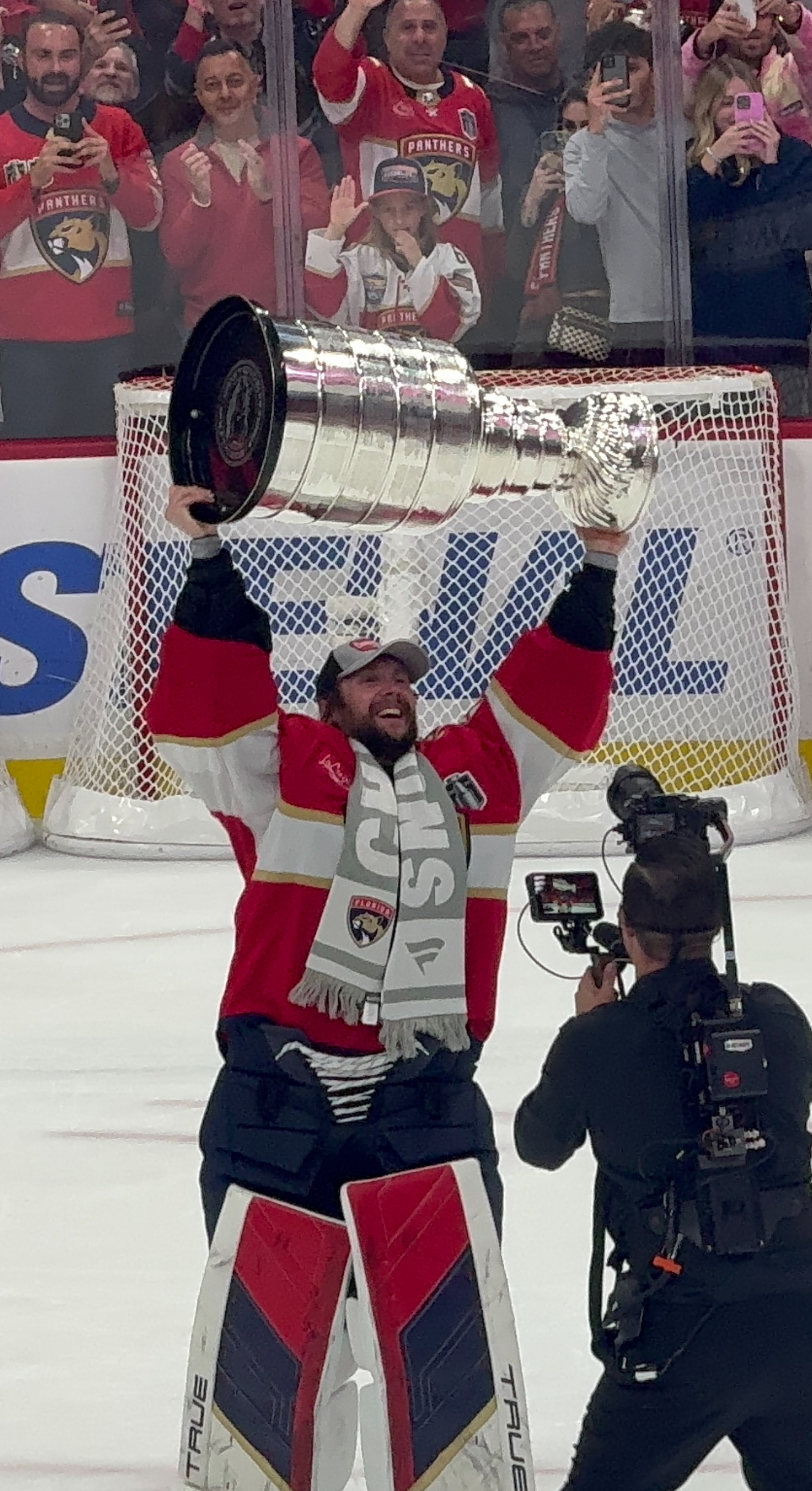
Goaltender Sergei Bobrovsky hoisting the Stanley Cup in 2024.

For the 2023–24 season, the Panthers were expected to regress, as it was believed their aggressive forechecking and stout defense would be figured out by rival teams. However, the Panthers once again enjoyed a successful season. They went 52–24–6 for 110 points, star winger Sam Reinhart netted 57 goals (behind Auston Matthews for the league lead), and overtook the Boston Bruins in the last regular season game for the Atlantic Division crown, their third in franchise history. Barkov became the franchise's all-time points leader in a 5–2 win over the Detroit Red Wings on March 20. The Panthers defeated the Toronto Maple Leafs 5–2 at home, while the Bruins were ousted by the Ottawa Senators, 3–1, to win the division. In the first round of the 2024 playoffs, the Panthers played against their rivals, the Tampa Bay Lightning, and won the series in five games. In the next round, the Panthers played the Boston Bruins again, this time winning the series in six games. In the conference finals, they won the six-game series against the New York Rangers, advancing to the Stanley Cup Final for the second straight year, where they defeated the Edmonton Oilers in seven games to win their first Stanley Cup in franchise history.

In the 2024–25 season, the Panthers placed third in the Atlantic Division and fifth in the Eastern Conference. The team dealt with injuries towards the end of the season, including to star forward Matthew Tkachuk and defenseman Dmitry Kulikov. Tkachuk was injured during the 4 Nations Face-Off, but he returned for the playoffs. Longtime defenseman Aaron Ekblad was suspended 20 games for violating the NHL/NHLPA Performance Enhancing Substances Program. The Panthers once again met their cross-state rival the Tampa Bay Lightning in the first round of the 2025 playoffs, with Florida winning a five-game series. In the second round, the Panthers crossed paths with the Toronto Maple Leafs. Despite falling down 2–0 in the series, the Panthers won four out of the next five games. In the conference finals, Florida faced the Carolina Hurricanes whom the Panthers defeated in the 2023 conference finals. After taking a 3–0 series lead, the Panthers would go on to win the series in five games, clinching their third consecutive conference championship and a trip to the 2025 Stanley Cup Final. In the Stanley Cup Final, the Panthers defeated the Edmonton Oilers in a rematch of the previous year's Cup Final in six games to win their second straight Stanley Cup and repeat as Stanley Cup champions.

In the 2025–26 season, the Panthers had many players that were injured, including captain Alexander Barkov. They missed the 2026 playoffs, becoming the first defending Stanley Cup champion since the 2014–15 Los Angeles Kings to miss the playoffs. In the 2026 off-season the Panthers traded for Brady Tkachuk. After the trade, Sergei Bobrovsky ended his tenure with the Panthers by signing a free agent deal with the Toronto Maple Leafs as a free agent.

== Team identity ==
=== Logos, colors, and uniforms ===
The Florida Panthers have had just two primary logos over the course of their history. Their first logo, used from 1993 to 2016, depicted a leaping panther. Other logos from the era included an alternate version of the "leaping panther" logo, this time holding a pair of broken hockey sticks, and a logo depicting a yellow sun behind a hockey stick and a palm tree. The "leaping panther" logo was redesigned and relegated to an alternate logo when the Panthers unveiled a new logo in the 2016–17 season. The current primary logo is a shield with the profile of a panther head below the word "Florida"; the same logo with the word "Panthers" above is also used interchangeably. When used as the jersey crest, the "Panthers" variant is used on home jerseys and the "Florida" variant is used on away jerseys.

The Panthers' first uniform set was used from 1993 to 2007. The red road and white home uniforms featured the leaping panther crest in front and the alternate palm tree logo on the shoulders. Diagonal stripes accentuated the sleeves and the yoke design was triangular in shape. Yellow and navy were used as accent colors.

In 1998, the Panthers debuted an alternate navy uniform, with the front crest depicting the leaping panther holding a pair of broken hockey sticks. Prior to the 2003–04 season, the navy uniform became the primary home uniform while the red uniform was relegated to alternate status. The crests on both uniforms were also switched.

Adopting the Reebok Edge template in 2007, the Panthers revealed new uniform designs. The navy and white uniforms sported a thicker stripe on each sleeve along with added piping.

In 2009, the Panthers unveiled a navy alternate uniform, featuring a roundel crest depicting a panther head surrounded by the team name. Powder blue replaced red as trim color and the alternate "FLA" sunshine logo was placed on the shoulders. This uniform was used for three seasons.

Before the 2011–12 season, the Panthers retired their primary navy uniforms and returned to wearing red uniforms at home. The piping on the chest was also eliminated.

The Panthers overhauled their visual design prior to the 2016–17 season, replacing yellow with flat gold as trim color. Red uniforms featured the shield logo with the team name, while the white uniforms used the variation with the state name. An alternate logo featuring the flag of Florida below a crawling panther is added on the sleeves. Both sets feature thick contrasting stripes on the chest and sleeves. The basic design was retained once Adidas took over as supplier prior to the 2017–18 season.

For the 2020–21 season, the Panthers released a "Reverse Retro" alternate uniform, essentially a recoloring of the team's original uniform. In this case, the Panthers wore their original 1990s "leaping panther" uniform, but with a navy base and flat gold replacing yellow as a trim color. A second "Reverse Retro" uniform was unveiled, again using the same 1990s-era template but with a powder blue base (a nod to the 2009–12 navy alternates) and the alternate palm tree, sun and stick logo in front.

For the Panthers' appearance at the 2026 NHL Winter Classic, they wore red uniforms with cream letters, navy blue and gold stripes. A variation of the "leaping panther" crest is rendered in chain-stitched felt.

=== Mascots ===
The Panthers have two mascots: Stanley C. Panther and Viktor E. Ratt.

Stanley C. Panther is a large anthropomorphic Florida panther and is the Panther's official mascot. He is named for the Stanley Cup. Further, Stanley C. Panther was introduced during the 1995–96 season. He was named by Darrel Ambrosini, a then-five-year-old fan of the team who creatively came up with the mascot's moniker.

Viktor E. Ratt was introduced in October 2014 after much debate and honors the club's 1996 Stanley Cup Final run where rats were tossed on ice. He is an anthropomorphic rat.

== Broadcasting ==
=== Television ===
The Panthers' designated television market includes South Florida. In July 2024, amid Bally Sports's bankruptcy, the Panthers announced an agreement with the E.W. Scripps Company and its Scripps Sports division, under a multi-year deal beginning in the 2024–25 season. Scripps' Miami-Fort Lauderdale station WSFL-TV serves as flagship station of the Panthers' television network, while WHDT airs games in the Stuart–West Palm Beach market. WFTX-DT3 airs games in the Fort Myers-Naples market. The Panthers stream in-market games on Panthers+.

From its inaugural season through 2023–24, Bally Sports Florida (formerly Fox Sports Florida and SportsChannel Florida) was the regional television rightsholder for all Panthers games not broadcast exclusively by the NHL's national television partners.

Panthers games on TV are called by Steve Goldstein on play-by-play, and Randy Moller on color.

=== Radio ===
The team has a radio deal with Audacy, Inc. to broadcast Panther games on the radio. Audacy airs the team's games on WQAM 560 repeating on 96.5 (HD2) and 99.9 (HD2) in Broward/Dade, WBZT 1230 repeating on 98.7 (HD2) in West Palm Beach, WCTH-FM 100.3 in the Florida Keys, and WCZR-FM 101.7 in the Treasure Coast.

Panthers games on radio are called by Doug Plagens on play-by-play, and Bill Lindsay on color.

== Minor league affiliates ==
In September 2020, the Panthers reached an agreement to partner with the Charlotte Checkers of the AHL to be the Panthers' top affiliate. The Checkers receive many of the team's top prospects and draft picks to further their development. The length of the multi-year affiliation was not announced.

In June 2024, the Panthers announced an affiliation agreement with the Savannah Ghost Pirates of the ECHL. The length of the multi-year affiliation was not announced. The Florida Everblades were the Panthers' ECHL affiliate for the 2022–23 and 2023–24 seasons.

== Season-by-season record ==
This is a partial list of the last five seasons completed by the Panthers. For the full season-by-season history, see List of Florida Panthers seasons.

Note: GP = Games played, W = Wins, L = Losses, T = Ties, OTL = Overtime Losses, Pts = Points, GF = Goals for, GA = Goals against

Season	GP	W	L	OTL	Pts	GF	GA	Finish	Playoffs
2021–22	82	58	18	6	122	340	246	1st, Atlantic	Lost in second round, 0–4 (Lightning)
2022–23	82	42	32	8	92	290	273	4th, Atlantic	Lost in Stanley Cup Final, 1–4 (Golden Knights)
2023–24	82	52	24	6	110	268	200	1st, Atlantic	Stanley Cup champions, 4–3 (Oilers)
2024–25	82	47	31	4	98	252	223	3rd, Atlantic	Stanley Cup champions, 4–2 (Oilers)
2025–26	82	40	38	4	84	251	276	7th, Atlantic	Did not qualify

== Players and personnel ==
=== Current roster ===
Updated October 20, 2026

No.	Nat	Player	Pos	S/G	Age	Acquired	Birthplace
26	(Latvia)	Uvis Balinskis	D	L	30	2023	Ventspils, Latvia
16	(Finland)	Aleksander Barkov (C)	C	L	31	2013	Tampere, Finland
9	(Canada)	Sam Bennett	C	L	30	2021	East Gwillimbury, Ontario
31	(United States)	Cooper Black	G	R	25	2026	Alpena, Michigan
5	(Canada)	Aaron Ekblad (A)	D	R	30	2014	Windsor, Ontario
20	(Denmark)	Lars Eller	C	L	37	2026	Rødovre, Denmark
42	(Sweden)	Gustav Forsling	D	L	30	2021	Linköping, Sweden
12	(Canada)	Jonah Gadjovich	LW	L	28	2023	Whitby, Ontario
6	(Czech Republic)	Radko Gudas	D	R	36	2026	Prague, Czechoslovakia
21	(United States)	Garnet Hathaway	RW	R	34	2026	Naples, Florida
14	(Canada)	Bokondji Imama	LW	L	30	2026	Montreal, Quebec
3	(United States)	Seth Jones	D	R	32	2025	Arlington, Texas
7	(Russia)	Dmitry Kulikov	D	L	36	2023	Lipetsk, Soviet Union
18	(United States)	Sam Lafferty	C	R	31	2026	Hollidaysburg, Pennsylvania
15	(Finland)	Anton Lundell	C	L	25	2020	Espoo, Finland
27	(Finland)	Eetu Luostarinen	C	L	28	2020	Siilinjärvi, Finland
63	(Canada)	Brad Marchand	LW	L	38	2025	Halifax, Nova Scotia
25	(Sweden)	Jacob Markström	G	L	36	2026	Gävle, Sweden
77	(Finland)	Niko Mikkola	D	L	30	2023	Kiiminki, Finland
13	(Canada)	Sam Reinhart	C	R	31	2021	North Vancouver, British Columbia
40	(Switzerland)	Akira Schmid	G	L	26	2026	Bern, Switzerland
8	(United States)	Brady Tkachuk	LW	L	27	2026	Scottsdale, Arizona
19	(United States)	Matthew Tkachuk (A)	LW	L	28	2022	Scottsdale, Arizona
23	(Canada)	Carter Verhaeghe	C	L	31	2020	Toronto, Ontario
95	(Latvia)	Sandis Vilmanis	LW	L	22	2024	Riga, Latvia

=== Team captains ===
- Brian Skrudland, 1993–1997
- Scott Mellanby, 1997–2001
- Pavel Bure & Paul Laus, 2001–2002 (co-captains)
- Olli Jokinen, 2003–2008
- Bryan McCabe, 2009–2011
- Ed Jovanovski, 2013–2014
- Willie Mitchell, 2014–2016
- Derek MacKenzie, 2016–2018
- Aleksander Barkov, 2018–present

=== Head coaches ===
Paul Maurice has been the head coach of the Panthers since June 22, 2022.

=== General managers ===
Bill Zito has been the general manager of the Panthers since September 2, 2020.

== League and team honors ==
=== Awards and trophies ===
Stanley Cup

- 2023–24
- 2024–25

Prince of Wales Trophy

- 1995–96
- 2022–23
- 2023–24
- 2024–25

Presidents' Trophy

- 2021–22

Maurice "Rocket" Richard Trophy

- Pavel Bure: 1999–2000, 2000–01

Lady Byng Memorial Trophy

- Brian Campbell: 2011–12
- Aleksander Barkov: 2018–19

Calder Memorial Trophy

- Jonathan Huberdeau: 2012–13
- Aaron Ekblad: 2014–15

Bill Masterton Memorial Trophy

- Jaromír Jágr: 2015–16

Frank J. Selke Trophy

- Aleksander Barkov: 2020–21, 2023–24, 2024–25

King Clancy Memorial Trophy

- Aleksander Barkov: 2024–25

Conn Smythe Trophy

- Sam Bennett: 2024–25

=== First-round draft picks ===
- 1993: Rob Niedermayer (5th overall)
- 1994: Ed Jovanovski (1st overall)
- 1995: Radek Dvořák (10th overall)
- 1996: Marcus Nilson (20th overall)
- 1997: Mike Brown (20th overall)
- 1999: Denis Shvidki (12th overall)
- 2001: Stephen Weiss (4th overall), Lukáš Krajíček (24th overall)
- 2002: Jay Bouwmeester (3rd overall), Petr Tatíček (9th overall)
- 2003: Nathan Horton (3rd overall), Anthony Stewart (25th overall)
- 2004: Rostislav Olesz (7th overall)
- 2005: Kenndal McArdle (20th overall)
- 2006: Michael Frolík (10th overall)
- 2007: Keaton Ellerby (10th overall)
- 2009: Dmitri Kulikov (14th overall)
- 2010: Erik Gudbranson (3rd overall), Nick Bjugstad (19th overall), Quinton Howden (25th overall)
- 2011: Jonathan Huberdeau (3rd overall)
- 2012: Mike Matheson (23rd overall)
- 2013: Aleksander Barkov (2nd overall)
- 2014: Aaron Ekblad (1st overall)
- 2015: Lawson Crouse (11th overall)
- 2016: Henrik Borgström (23rd overall)
- 2017: Owen Tippett (10th overall)
- 2018: Grigori Denisenko (15th overall)
- 2019: Spencer Knight (13th overall)
- 2020: Anton Lundell (12th overall)
- 2021: Mackie Samoskevich (24th overall)

=== Hockey Hall of Fame inductees ===
The Florida Panthers have an affiliation with a number of inductees to the Hockey Hall of Fame. Inductees affiliated with the Panthers include eight former players and two builders of the sport. Builders that have an affiliation with the Panthers include former head coach Roger Nielson, and Bill Torrey, former general manager of the Panthers. Former play-by-play commentator, Dave Strader was also a recipient of the Foster Hewitt Memorial Award from the Hockey Hall of Fame, for his contributions in hockey broadcasting.

Players

- Ed Belfour
- Pavel Bure
- Dino Ciccarelli
- Igor Larionov
- Roberto Luongo
- Joe Nieuwendyk
- Joe Thornton
- Mike Vernon

Builders

- Roger Neilson
- Bill Torrey

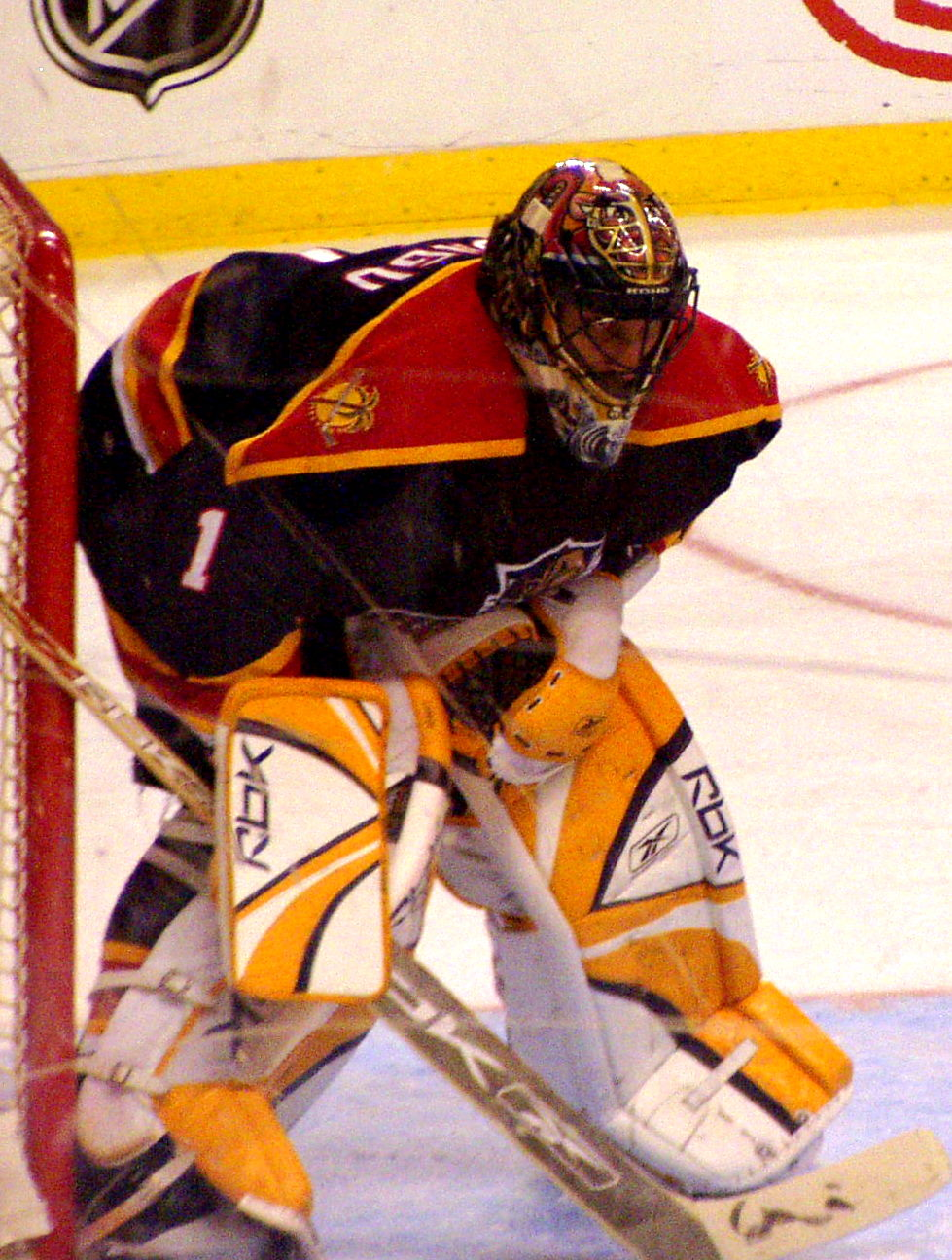
Goaltender Roberto Luongo is the only player to have his jersey number retired by the Panthers

=== Retired numbers ===
Florida Panthers retired numbers
No.	Player	Position	Career	No. retirement
1	Roberto Luongo	G	2000–2006; 2014–2019	March 7, 2020
37	Wayne Huizenga	Owner	1993–2001	January 19, 2018
93	Bill Torrey	President; General manager	1993–2001	October 23, 2010

- The NHL retired Wayne Gretzky's No. 99 for all its member teams at the 2000 NHL All-Star Game.

== Franchise statistics and records ==
=== Scoring leaders ===
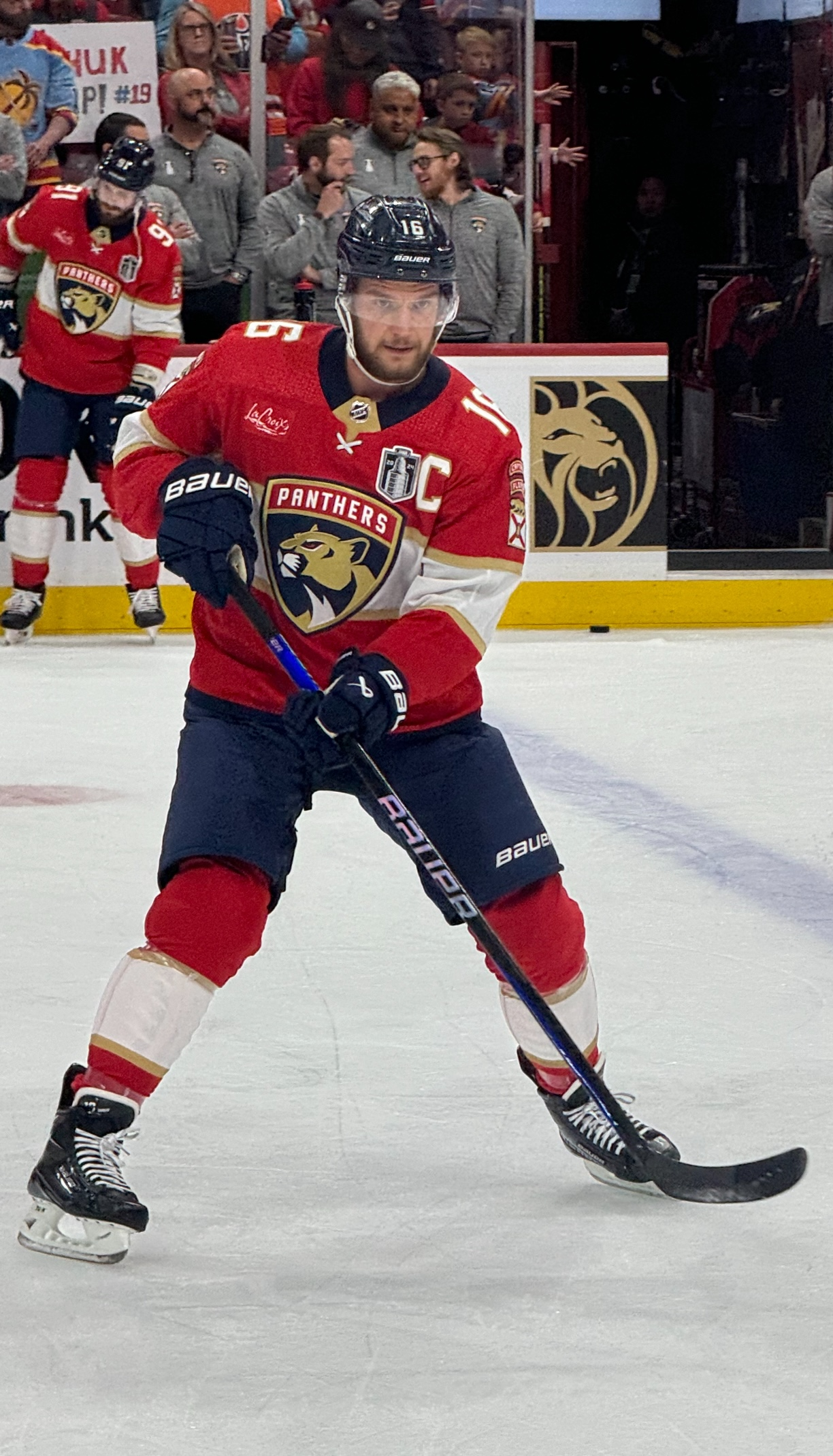
Longtime captain Aleksander Barkov leads the franchise in goals, assists, and points.

These are the top-ten point-scorers in franchise history. Figures are updated after each completed NHL regular season.

- * – current Panthers player

Note: Pos = Position; GP = Games Played; G = Goals; A = Assists; Pts = Points; P/G = Points per game

Points
Player	Pos	GP	G	A	Pts	P/G
Aleksander Barkov*	C	804	286	496	782	.97
Jonathan Huberdeau	LW	671	198	415	613	.91
Olli Jokinen	C	567	188	231	419	.74
Aaron Ekblad*	D	804	122	284	406	.50
Stephen Weiss	C	654	145	249	394	.60
Sam Reinhart*	C	385	189	196	385	1.00
Scott Mellanby	RW	552	157	197	354	.64
Carter Verhaeghe*	C	436	163	181	344	.79
Nathan Horton	C	422	142	153	295	.70
Viktor Kozlov	C	414	101	190	291	.70

Goals
Player	Pos	G
Aleksander Barkov*	C	286
Jonathan Huberdeau	LW	198
Sam Reinhart*	C	189
Olli Jokinen	C	188
Carter Verhaeghe*	C	163
Scott Mellanby	RW	157
Pavel Bure	RW	152
Stephen Weiss	C	145
Nathan Horton	C	142
Aaron Ekblad*	D	122

Assists
Player	Pos	A
Aleksander Barkov*	C	496
Jonathan Huberdeau	LW	415
Aaron Ekblad*	D	284
Stephen Weiss	C	249
Olli Jokinen	C	231
Róbert Švehla	D	229
Keith Yandle	D	201
Scott Mellanby	RW	197
Sam Reinhart*	C	196
Viktor Kozlov	C	190

=== Goaltending leaders ===
These goaltenders rank in the top ten in franchise history for wins. Figures are updated after each completed NHL season.

- * – current Panthers player

Note: GP = Games played; W = Wins; L = Losses; T/O = Ties/Overtime losses; GA = Goal against; GAA = Goals against average; SA = Shots against; SV% = Save percentage; SO = Shutouts

Goaltenders
Player	GP	W	L	T/O	GA	GAA	SA	SV%	SO
Roberto Luongo	572	230	241	73	1,415	2.62	17,501	.919	38
Sergei Bobrovsky	349	201	113	21	940	2.80	9,683	.903	20
John Vanbiesbrouck	268	106	108	43	666	2.58	7,605	.912	13
Tomáš Vokoun	248	101	108	30	612	2.57	7,902	.923	23
James Reimer	123	53	42	16	311	2.85	3,524	.912	7
Spencer Knight	80	44	25	7	203	2.76	2,162	.906	5
Mark Fitzpatrick	119	43	42	22	295	2.71	3,051	.903	4
Scott Clemmensen	120	40	39	18	300	2.88	3,149	.905	3
Trevor Kidd	103	28	50	13	289	3.09	2,883	.900	3
Ed Belfour	58	27	17	10	152	2.77	1,550	.902	1

=== Franchise individual records ===
- Most goals in a season: Pavel Bure, 59 (2000–01)
- Most assists in a season: Jonathan Huberdeau, 85 (2021–22)
- Most points in a season: Jonathan Huberdeau, 115 (2021–22)
- Most penalty minutes in a season: Peter Worrell, 354 (2001–02)
- Most points in a season, defenseman: Brandon Montour, 73 (2022–23)
- Most points in a season, rookie: Jesse Bélanger, 50 (1993–94)
- Highest +/- in a season: Gustav Forsling, +56 (2023–24)
- Most wins in a season: Sergei Bobrovsky, 39 (2021–22)
- Most saves in a shutout win: Craig Anderson, 53
- Most shutouts in a season: Roberto Luongo (2003–04), Tomáš Vokoun (2009–10), 7
- All-time leader in goals against average: Tomáš Vokoun, 2.57
- All-time leader in shutouts: Roberto Luongo, 38
- All-time leader in games played by a goaltender: Roberto Luongo, 572
- All-time leader in wins by a goaltender: Roberto Luongo, 230

=== Other honors ===
Featured as cover athlete of NHL 97 video game: John Vanbiesbrouck.

Featured as cover athlete of NHL 26 video game: Matthew Tkachuk.

== See also ==
- List of Florida Panthers general managers
- List of Florida Panthers head coaches
- List of Florida Panthers players
- Sports in Miami
- FTL War Memorial

Preceded by Vegas Golden Knights	Stanley Cup champions 2023–24, 2024–25	Succeeded by Carolina Hurricanes
