= Bill Torrey =

Canadian ice hockey executive

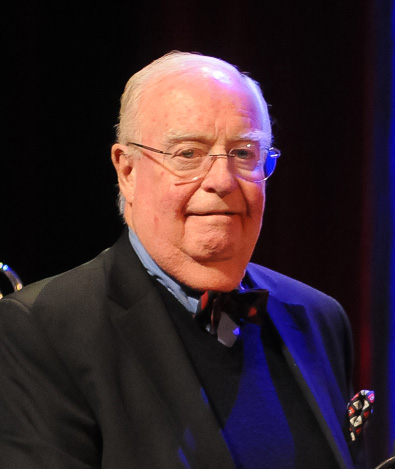
- Torrey in 2015
- Born: June 23, 1934; Montreal, Quebec, Canada
- Died: May 2, 2018 (aged 83); West Palm Beach, Florida, U.S.
- Occupation: Hockey executive
- Known for: General manager of the New York Islanders (1972–1992); President of the Florida Panthers (1993–2001)
- Awards: Hockey Hall of Fame (1995)

William Arthur Torrey (June 23, 1934 – May 2, 2018) was a Canadian hockey executive. He served as a general manager in the National Hockey League (NHL) for the Oakland Seals, New York Islanders, and Florida Panthers. He developed the Islanders into a dynasty that won the Stanley Cup four consecutive times. He was often called "The Architect", or "Bow Tie Bill" for the bow tie he wore.

== Early life ==
Torrey was born on June 23, 1934, in Montreal, and raised near the Montreal Forum. His father worked as a stockbroker. He tried out for the Montreal Canadiens, and attended St. Lawrence University on a scholarship to play hockey. He lost his depth perception after he was hit in the left eye with a hockey stick, breaking his orbital bone. Torrey earned a degree in psychology, while also taking business classes. He then worked in Barrie, Ontario, at a radio station, and worked for NBC as a tour guide at Rockefeller Center.

== Hockey career ==
=== Oakland Seals ===
In the mid-1960s, Torrey began working for the Pittsburgh Hornets of the American Hockey League, setting up promotional events. He became general manager of the Oakland Seals, a recently created expansion team in the NHL, in 1969. The next year, Charlie Finley bought the team. Finley and Torrey clashed on issues ranging from personnel moves to marketing, and Torrey left the organization in 1971.

=== New York Islanders ===
Torrey was named the general manager of the expansion New York Islanders on February 15, 1972, at a press conference held across the street from Roosevelt Raceway at a restaurant owned by Burt Bacharach. He was the organization's first employee. Rather than trade for veteran players in hopes of winning right away, Torrey was committed to building through the draft. He felt that pursuing a "win now" strategy didn't make sense in the long run. Torrey drafted Denis Potvin first overall in the 1973 entry draft. Montreal Canadiens general manager Sam Pollock approached Torrey, hoping to trade for Potvin. Pollock's strategy was to offer a "quick-fix" package of mature players to exchange for the top draft pick, and it was tempting as the Islanders would immediately benefit from the trade. Torrey ultimately turned down the offer. Within several years Potvin blossomed into one of the NHL's elite defensemen and eventually became captain of the team.

In the Islanders' first two seasons, the team finished last in the league. This netted them high picks in the draft. With those picks, Torrey quickly assembled a roster that rose from a doormat to an NHL power. In the 1977 NHL amateur draft, Torrey had the 15th pick and had to make a tough decision between two promising forwards, Mike Bossy and Dwight Foster. Bossy was known as a scorer who couldn't check, while Foster could check but wasn't very good offensively. Coach Al Arbour persuaded Torrey to pick Bossy, figuring it was easier to teach a scorer how to check. Bossy immediately emerged as one of the league's elite snipers in his first season, in which he set a then-NHL record with 53 goals as a rookie. Bossy achieved nine consecutive 50-goal seasons, as well as having more than adequate defensive skills.

After helping minority owner John Pickett Jr. buy the franchise in 1979, Torrey was promoted to team president. In 1980, after the Islanders had underachieved in the playoffs for the past few years despite success in the regular season, Torrey made the difficult decision to trade longtime and popular veterans Billy Harris and Dave Lewis to the Los Angeles Kings in return for Butch Goring.

Under Torrey's leadership, the Islanders won the Stanley Cup four consecutive times: in 1980, 1981, 1982, and 1983. They won 19 consecutive postseason series. Along the way, he picked future Hall of Fame goalie Billy Smith in the team's original expansion draft and drafted five Hall of Fame players—Denis Potvin, Clark Gillies, Bryan Trottier, Mike Bossy, and Pat LaFontaine—in the entry draft. He also hired as head coach Al Arbour, another Hall of Famer who won the Cup four times as a player.

After LaFontaine demanded a trade and held out for the start of the 1991–92 season, Torrey engineered a rebuilding project. He dealt LaFontaine, Randy Wood, and Randy Hillier (along with future considerations) to the Buffalo Sabres in return for Pierre Turgeon, Benoît Hogue, Uwe Krupp and Dave McLlwain. He also sent captain Brent Sutter and Brad Lauer to the Chicago Blackhawks for Steve Thomas and Adam Creighton. Pickett turned over day-to-day control to a management committee of four minority owners. After the Islanders missed the playoffs in 1992, Torrey was forced to resign.

=== Florida Panthers ===
Torrey was named president of the Florida Panthers, a new expansion team, in 1993. Torrey built his new team similarly to the Islanders, acquiring young talent that included Rob Niedermayer, Ed Jovanovski, Radek Dvořák, and Rhett Warrener. The Panthers made it to the 1996 Stanley Cup Final. The team reached the playoffs twice more prior to his retirement in 2001. He remained with the team as special advisor.

== Honors ==
Torrey was elected to the Hockey Hall of Fame in 1995. He is honoured by the New York Islanders with a banner in UBS Arena along with Al Arbour and six of the players he drafted. Torrey's banner has the words "The Architect" and the image of a bowtie.

On October 23, 2010, the Florida Panthers honoured Torrey by retiring the number 93 and raising a banner in his honour to the rafters. The 93 represents the year (1993) when the Panthers franchise was incorporated into the NHL.

== Personal life ==
Torrey had four sons, and ten grandchildren. Torrey died at his home in West Palm Beach, Florida, on the evening of May 2, 2018.

Sporting positions
Preceded by Frank Selke Jr.	General Manager of the Oakland Seals; 1970	Succeeded by Fred Glover
Preceded by Position created	General Manager of the New York Islanders; 1972–92	Succeeded by Don Maloney
Preceded by Bryan Murray	General Manager of the Florida Panthers; 2000–01	Succeeded by Chuck Fletcher
