= Tom Rowe (ice hockey) =

American ice hockey player, coach, and executive

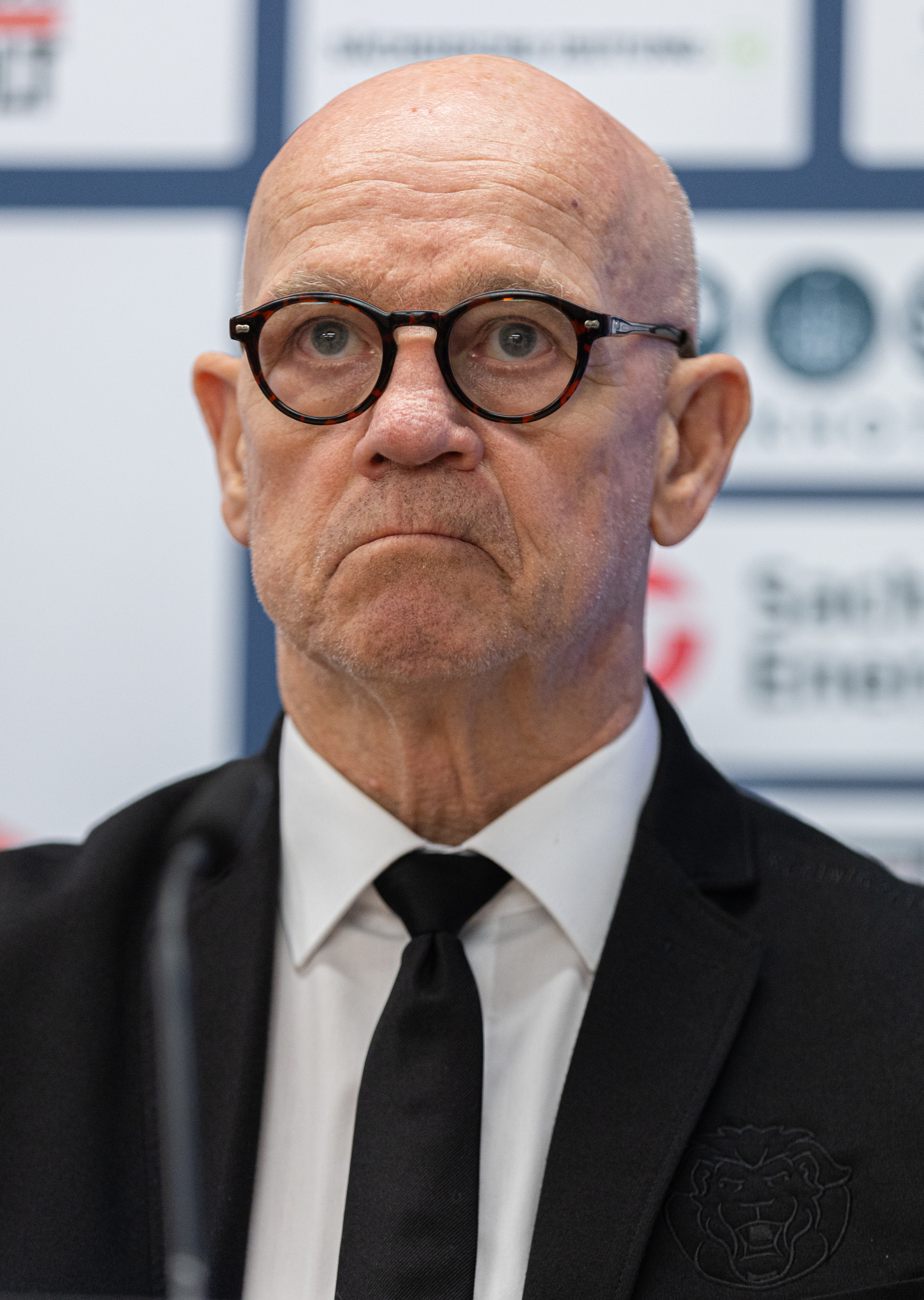
- Rowe in 2025
- Born: May 23, 1956 (age 70) Lynn, Massachusetts, U.S.
- Height: 6 ft 0 in (183 cm)
- Weight: 190 lb (86 kg; 13 st 8 lb)
- Position: Right wing
- Shot: Right
- Played for: Detroit Red Wings; Washington Capitals; Hartford Whalers
- National team: United States
- NHL draft: 37th overall, 1976; Washington Capitals
- WHA draft: 20th overall, 1976; Winnipeg Jets
- Playing career: 1976–1984

Thomas John Rowe (born May 23, 1956) is an American ice hockey executive, former player and coach.

== Career ==
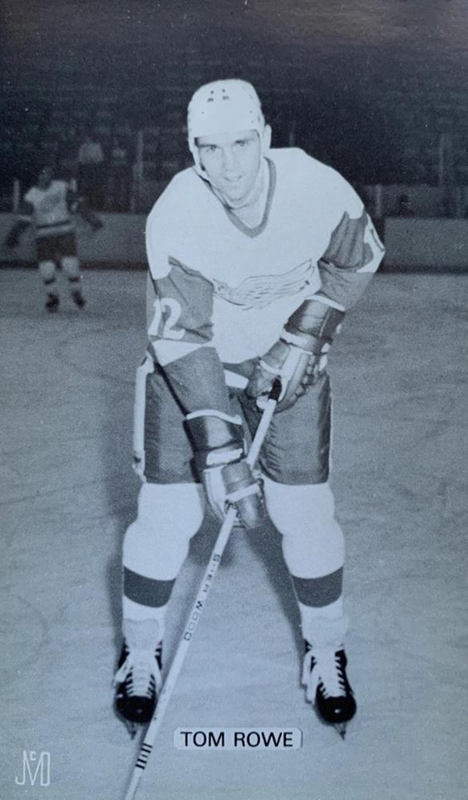
1980s postcard of Rowe for Detroit Red Wings

Selected by the Washington Capitals in the 1976 NHL entry draft, Rowe also played for the Hartford Whalers and Detroit Red Wings. He was also a member of the United States national team at the 1977 Ice Hockey World Championships. Rowe was the first American-born player to score 30 or more goals in an NHL season. He accomplished this feat in the 1978–79 season with the Washington Capitals. That season he scored 31 goals in 69 games.

Rowe was an assistant coach for the Carolina Hurricanes of the National Hockey League from 2008 until 2011. Rowe previously coached the Albany River Rats and Lowell Lock Monsters. He won a Stanley Cup championship with the Carolina Hurricanes in 2006.

On April 9, 2012, Rowe was announced as the new head coach of the hockey club Lokomotiv Yaroslavl.

On November 9, 2013, Rowe was announced as the new head coach of the San Antonio Rampage, the AHL farm team for the Florida Panthers. In 2015, when the Panthers relocated their AHL affiliation to Portland, Maine, Rowe became head coach of the Portland Pirates. During his first season with the Pirates, Rowe left the club mid-season when he was promoted by the Panthers to take up a position as the associate general manager on January 1, 2016. On November 27, 2016, Rowe fired head coach Gerard Gallant and took over as head coach.

On April 10, 2017, Rowe was demoted from his role as head coach and general manager but stayed with the Panthers organization as an advisor to president and general manager Dale Tallon.

== Career statistics ==
=== Regular season and playoffs ===
| | | | Regular season | | | | | Playoffs |
| Season | Team | League | GP | G | A | Pts | PIM | GP | G | A | Pts | PIM |
|---|---|---|---|---|---|---|---|---|---|---|---|---|
| 1973–74 | London Knights | OHA-Jr. | 70 | 30 | 39 | 69 | 99 | — | — | — | — | — |
| 1974–75 | London Knights | OMJHL | 63 | 19 | 15 | 34 | 137 | — | — | — | — | — |
| 1975–76 | London Knights | OMJHL | 60 | 39 | 55 | 94 | 98 | 5 | 1 | 3 | 4 | 14 |
| 1976–77 | Washington Capitals | NHL | 12 | 1 | 2 | 3 | 2 | — | — | — | — | — |
| 1976–77 | Springfield Indians | AHL | 67 | 19 | 23 | 42 | 117 | — | — | — | — | — |
| 1977–78 | Washington Capitals | NHL | 63 | 13 | 8 | 21 | 82 | — | — | — | — | — |
| 1978–79 | Washington Capitals | NHL | 69 | 31 | 30 | 61 | 137 | — | — | — | — | — |
| 1979–80 | Washington Capitals | NHL | 41 | 10 | 17 | 27 | 76 | — | — | — | — | — |
| 1979–80 | Hartford Whalers | NHL | 20 | 6 | 4 | 10 | 30 | 3 | 2 | 0 | 2 | 0 |
| 1980–81 | Hartford Whalers | NHL | 74 | 13 | 28 | 41 | 190 | — | — | — | — | — |
| 1981–82 | Hartford Whalers | NHL | 21 | 4 | 0 | 4 | 36 | — | — | — | — | — |
| 1981–82 | Binghamton Whalers | AHL | 8 | 5 | 3 | 8 | 36 | — | — | — | — | — |
| 1981–82 | Washington Capitals | NHL | 6 | 1 | 1 | 2 | 18 | — | — | — | — | — |
| 1981–82 | Hershey Bears | AHL | 34 | 17 | 17 | 34 | 89 | 5 | 3 | 4 | 7 | 33 |
| 1982–83 | Detroit Red Wings | NHL | 51 | 6 | 10 | 16 | 44 | — | — | — | — | — |
| 1982–83 | Adirondack Red Wings | AHL | 20 | 16 | 7 | 23 | 26 | — | — | — | — | — |
| 1983–84 | Moncton Alpines | AHL | 50 | 28 | 16 | 44 | 86 | — | — | — | — | — |
| NHL totals | | | 357 | 85 | 100 | 185 | 615 | 3 | 2 | 0 | 2 | 0 |
| AHL totals | | | 179 | 85 | 66 | 151 | 354 | 5 | 3 | 4 | 7 | 33 |

=== International ===
| Year | Team | Event | GP | G | A | Pts | PIM |
|---|---|---|---|---|---|---|---|
| 1977 | United States | WC | 3 | 0 | 0 | 0 | 2 |

== Head coaching record ==
| Team | Year | Regular season | | | | | | Postseason | | | |
| Team | Year | Games | Won | Lost | OTL | Points | Finish | Won | Lost | Win % | Result |
|---|---|---|---|---|---|---|---|---|---|---|---|
| Florida Panthers | 2016–17 | 60 | 24 | 26 | 10 | 58 | 6th in Atlantic | — | — | — | Missed playoffs |
| NHL totals | | 60 | 24 | 26 | 10 | 58 | | — | — | — | |

| Preceded by Dale Tallon | General manager of the Florida Panthers; 2016–17 | Succeeded by Dale Tallon |
| Preceded by Gerard Gallant | Head coach of the Florida Panthers; 2016–17 | Succeeded by Bob Boughner |
