= Bill Zito =

American lawyer and ice hockey executive

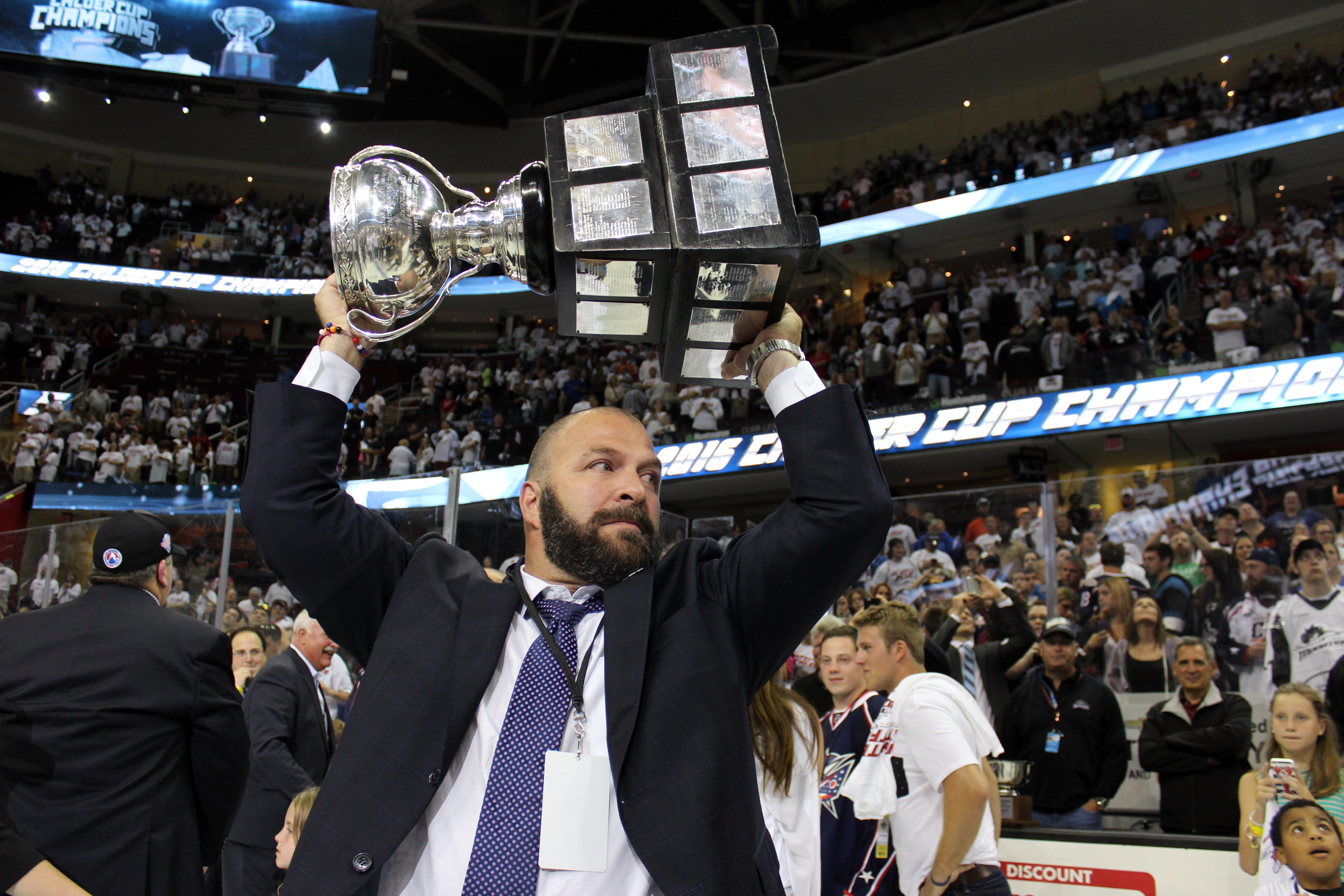
- Zito celebrating with the Lake Erie Monsters in 2016
- Born: William Francis Zito, Jr. September 16, 1964 (age 62); Pittsburgh, Pennsylvania, U.S.
- Occupation: General manager of the Florida Panthers

William Francis Zito, Jr. (born September 16, 1964) is an American ice hockey executive, former attorney and professional sports agent currently serving as general manager of the Florida Panthers of the National Hockey League (NHL).

== Early life and education ==
Zito was born in Pittsburgh, Pennsylvania, to former University of Pittsburgh and Steelers football player William Zito Sr. and Priscilla Zito (née McCormack). Zito grew up in Whitefish Bay, Wisconsin, and attended University School of Milwaukee, and then one season at Phillips Andover Academy. As a teenager, he was a batboy for the Milwaukee Brewers during their World Series run in 1982. He attended Yale University and played on the varsity ice hockey team from 1984 to 1987, and was a member of Delta Kappa Epsilon Fraternity (Phi Chapter). After graduating from Yale, he completed law school at the University of Wisconsin.

== Sports agent ==
After graduating from law school, Zito practiced at law firms in New York and Chicago. In 1995, he founded sports agency Acme World Sports with close friend Markus Lehto. Through Acme World Sports, Zito represented many National Hockey League players including Tim Thomas, Tuukka Rask, Antti Niemi and Brian Rafalski, as well as several prominent professional ice hockey players in Europe. In 2013, Acme World Sports was listed as the 8th highest grossing hockey agency in the world. Zito negotiated several precedent-setting contracts, including a 6-year, US$38 million contract for Kimmo Timonen in 2007, a 6-year, $33 million contract for James Wisniewski in 2011 and an 8-year, $56 million deal for Tuukka Rask in 2013.

== Team management ==
In August 2013, Zito joined the management organization of the Columbus Blue Jackets. In June 2015, he was named the general manager of the Cleveland Monsters, the Blue Jackets' affiliate club in the American Hockey League (AHL). As the 2010s ended, Zito was considered to be a rising star in the executive world and was interviewed for numerous general manager positions in the NHL, including in 2019 when he was interviewed to be the inaugural general manager of the expansion Seattle Kraken (who ultimately hired Ron Francis) and underwent a lengthy interview process with the Edmonton Oilers (who ultimately hired Ken Holland).

On September 2, 2020, Zito was hired as the general manager of the Florida Panthers. On April 12, 2021, Zito was named the TSN TradeCentre GM of the Day, for his transactions at the 2021 NHL Trade Deadline. On June 24, 2024, he won the Stanley Cup as the general manager of the Florida Panthers. On June 17, 2025, he managed the Florida Panthers to a second consecutive Stanley Cup. Both times, the Panthers defeated the Oilers in the Final. In addition to his two Cups during his first five seasons with the Panthers, Zito was a four-time finalist for the Jim Gregory General Manager of the Year Award.

Preceded by Dale Tallon	General manager of the Florida Panthers; 2020–present	Incumbent
