= Mushroom Jazz =

Series of musical compilations

Mushroom Jazz is a series of musical compilations by DJ Mark Farina. Originating in 1992 these were released on cassette tape, then since 1996 have been commercial CD and vinyl releases. Farina combines elements of downtempo, hip hop, jazz and R&B, French, Latin, beatmatching and mixing songs together. As with Farina's house mixes, the Mushroom Jazz series incorporates transitional effects (such as a high-pass filter) and a generally dry reverb tone.

Originally launched as a cassette series, the Mushroom Jazz tapes grew from the first Chicago run of 50 copies each on to the next stage, where 500 copies of several volumes were easily distributed and sought after.

As the acid jazz boom began, he perfected his sound and fused the newest tracks from the West Coast's jazzy, organic producers with the more urban sounds he had championed in Chicago. While the predominant musical force in San Francisco was still dark, dubby House and Wicked-style Breaks, the city embraced the downtempo movement with a healthy bunch of live bands and DJs generating the tunes.

Mark Farina, along with Patty Ryan-Smith, created the now legendary weekly Mushroom Jazz club night in San Francisco in 1992. Every Monday night the crowd slowly germinated from 100 for the first few months to 600-700 two years later. As time passed, Farina and Patty put their energies into another project, the first Mushroom Jazz interactive CD-ROM for Om Records. After a three-year run, where the club had established a fanatical, cult-like following for Farina and the Mushroom Jazz sound, the club closed its doors and transformed into a CD series and accompanying tours.

The eight commercial albums contain an array of artists including Chali 2na, Miguel Migs, People Under The Stairs, Colossus, and Pete Rock, as well as several original tracks by Farina.

Mushroom Jazz 8, the latest volume in the series, was released July 22, 2016.

== Volume 1 (1996) ==
Mushroom Jazz

Compilation album (Mixtape) by Various artists
- Released: 1996
- Recorded: Note: There are two versions of Volume 1. This is the track listing for the more common 71 min. mix. There is another earlier 45 min. version that includes the same 12 tracks but in a different order
- Genres: Instrumental hip hop, electronic, trip hop, downtempo
- Length: 71:14
- Label: Om Records
- Compiler: Mark Farina

Volume 1
Review scores
Source	Rating
Allmusic	link

1. "Bosha Nova" – Mr. Electric Triangle
2. "Remember Me" – Blue Boy
3. "Get This" – Groove Nation
4. "Pick Me Up" – Deadbeats feat. Isi Samuel
5. "Gibby Music" – Apollo Grooves
6. "Midnight Calling" – Naked Funk feat. Valerie Etienne
7. "Midnight Calling" (Fly Amanita Remix) – Mark Farina
8. "If We Lose Our Way" – Paul Johnson
9. "In Hale" – Hydroponic Groove Sessions
10. "Warm Chill" – Julius Papp
11. "Music Use It" – Lalomie Washburn
12. "Longevity" – J-Live

== Volume 2 (1998) ==
Mushroom Jazz 2

Compilation album (Mixtape) by Various artists
- Released: 1998
- Genres: Instrumental hip hop, electronic, trip hop
- Length: 78:10
- Label: Om Records
- Compiler: Mark Farina

Volume 2
Review scores
Source	Rating
Allmusic	link

1. "Then Came You" – Euphonic feat. Kevin Yost
2. "Sandworms" – Andy Caldwell vs. Darkhorse
3. "Piano Grand" – Tony D
4. "That Time of Day (Again)" – Jaywalkers
5. "Poppy's Song" – Big Muff
6. "Made in the Shade" – Deadbeats
7. "Cutee" – Spacehopper
8. "Make ME Happy" (DJ Spinna original mix) – Cooly's Hot Box
9. "If I Fall" (Jay's Urban dub) – Naked Music NYC
10. "How Sweet It Is" – Mr Scruff feat. Mark Rae
11. "Liquid" (instrumental) – L-Fudge
12. "Sunday Night" – DJ Migs
13. "Lyrics and Vibes" – Smoke No Bones
14. "Un Pépé Dans La Dentelle" – Pépé Bradock
15. Hidden track

== Volume 3 (2001) ==
Mushroom Jazz 3

Compilation album (Mixtape) by Various artists
- Released: 2001
- Genres: Instrumental hip hop, electronic, trip hop
- Length: 71:47
- Label: Om Records
- Compiler: Mark Farina

Volume 3
Review scores
Source	Rating
Allmusic	link

1. "California Suite" (Vagabond mix) – King Kooba
2. "De La Bass" (Mousse T's Def mix) (instrumental) – Raw Instinct
3. "Vibrate" – The Basement Khemist
4. "De La Bass" (Mousse T's Def mix) (vocal) – Raw Instinct
5. "Relax Your Mind" – DJ Presto
6. "Taste of Funk" – Mateo & Matos
7. "Dedicated" – Dynamic Syncopation
8. "Do It" – Daddy's Favourite
9. "Flirtation" – Herb Alpert
10. "Collage" – Urban Backcountry
11. "Jazz Cop" (Mix: LP Version) – Gripper
12. "Schooled in the Trade" – People Under The Stairs
13. "Seven Steps Behind" – Polyrhythm Addicts
14. "Trackrunners" – Unspoken Heard
15. "Do It" (instrumental) – Mountain Brothers
16. "Rock Box" (instrumental) – Que D
17. "Sneakin'" – Jaffa
18. "Streamline" – Slide 5
19. "Philadelphia" – Bahamadia

== Volume 4 (2002) ==
Mushroom Jazz, vol. 4

Compilation album (Mixtape) by Various artists
- Released: 2002
- Genres: Instrumental hip hop, electronic, trip hop
- Length: 69:51
- Label: Om Records
- Compiler: Mark Farina

Volume 4
Review scores
Source	Rating
Allmusic	link

1. "A Little Soul" (Petestrumental) – Pete Rock
2. "Hot Bananas" – Scienz of Life
3. "Suite for Beaver, Pt. 1" – People Under The Stairs
4. "Truth In Position" – Maspyke
5. "Chicago Babe" – Trankilou
6. "Wiggle and Giggle" – Joshua
7. "Shoplif" (instrumental) – Ripshop feat. Mr Lif
8. "Keep You Head Up" – Laurne'a
9. "Original Beats" – DJ Slave
10. "No" – Fat Jon
11. "Mellow Soul Fruit" – Wick Wack
12. "Listen" – Benny Blanko
13. "Phone Tap" – Bernal Boogie
14. "Irreconcilable" – Sub-Conscious
15. "Seems to Know" – Julius Papp & Dave Warrin
16. "Find Yourself" – Spacehopper
17. "Seven Days" – Tek 9
18. "Big Fish" – Dubble D
19. "Bath Music" – Greyboy

== Volume 5 (2005) ==
Mushroom Jazz 5

Compilation album (Mixtape) by Various artists
- Released: 2005
- Genres: Hip hop, instrumental hip hop, electronic, trip hop
- Length: 67:45
- Label: Om Records
- Compiler: Mark Farina

Volume 5
Review scores
Source	Rating
Allmusic	link

1. "Afros in Ya" – J Boogie's Dubtronic Science
2. "The Tribute" – Colossus
3. "Autumn's Evening Breeze" – The Sound Providers
4. "Comin' Thru" – DJ Nu-Mark feat. Chali 2na
5. "Come Down" – Red Astaire
6. "Flow" (Fluid instrumental mix) – Zion I
7. "Nostalgia" – DJ Spinna
8. "Cali Spaces" (original mix) – Mark Farina
9. "Funky For You" – Blu Bizness
10. "Puttin' In Work" (instrumental) – Wee Bee Foolish
11. "Hollywood" – DJ Dez
12. "Music Makes The World Go Round" – Jazz Liberatorz
13. "Maintain" (instrumental) – Strange Fruit Project
14. "Back In '92" (instrumental) – DJ Presto feat. Lowd
15. "You Like My Style" – Shortie No Mass
16. "Here's The Proof" – The Earl
17. "Modern Women's Short Stories" – Jonny Alpha
18. "The Kick Clap" (instrumental) – Starving Artists Crew
19. "It's A Love Thing" (instrumental) – Pete Rock
20. "The Yacht Club" – Thes One
21. "Nic's Groove" – The Foreign Exchange

== Volume 6 (2008) ==
Mushroom Jazz 6

Compilation album (Mixtape) by Various artists
- Released: 2008
- Genres: Hip hop, instrumental hip hop, electronic, trip hop
- Length: 63:06
- Label: Om Records
- Compiler: Mark Farina

Volume 6
Review scores
Source	Rating
Allmusic	link

1. "This Beat" – The Jazzual Suspects
2. "Fool's Competition" – Smooth Current
3. "Baaaby" – Ta'Raach
4. "Groovin'" – Kero One
5. "Jamal 141" – Jamal
6. "Dopebeatz" – Colossus
7. "Calm Down" (instrumental) – Brawdcast
8. "Alive" (instrumental) – J Boogie's Dubtronic Science feat. Crown City Rockers
9. "Scene #2 (instrumental)" – Gagle
10. "Just Checkin'" (J's Stripped Down instrumental) – Uneaq
11. "The What" – Colossus
12. "Bodysnatchin' (On The Isle)" (instrumental) – Rubberoom
13. "Wasn't Really Worth My Time" – Flash
14. "Life" – Mark Farina
15. "Ba Dada" – The Jazzual Suspects
16. "Untitled 005" – Super Smoky Soul
17. "Way Back When" – Choice37
18. "Transit" – Colossus
19. "Day At The Beach" – J Boogie's Dubtronic Science
20. "Reflections" – Dave Allison

== Volume 7 (2010) ==
Mushroom Jazz 7

Compilation album (Mixtape) by Various artists
- Released: 2010
- Genres: Hip hop, electronic, trip hop
- Length: 68:31
- Label: Om Records
- Compiler: Mark Farina

1. "Down The Road" – Lurob
2. "Macheeto" – Slakah the Beatchild
3. "Colorblind" – Nathan G
4. "Southern Plumperz'" – Andy Caldwell feat. Rico de Largo
5. "More" – Joshua Heath
6. "It's The Beat" – Tommy Largo
7. "Bad Back" – King Kooba
8. "Introduce (SLAP Mix)" – Colossus
9. "Just Move" – Uneaq
10. "(Never Been To) California" – Jazz Spastiks
11. "Live Forever" – Mark Oakland
12. "Night Time" – Tommy Largo
13. "Please Be Mine" – Derek Dunbar
14. "Walking The Dog" – Giano & Michael Knight
15. "Amber Leaf" – Jazz Spastiks
16. "Stressin'" – The Hue (Tim K and JT Donaldson) feat. Kissey Asplund
17. "Living For The Rush" – Slakah the Beatchild
18. "All Night" – Billa Qause
19. "Brooklyn's Groove" – Dave Allison

== Volume 8 (2016) ==
Mushroom Jazz 8

Compilation album (Mixtape) by Various artists
- Released: July 22, 2016
- Genres: Hip hop, electronic, trip hop
- Label: Great Lakes Audio
- Compiler: Mark Farina

1. "Intro"
2. "Crawfish & Chips" – QSTN
3. "Best Believe" – Emapea
4. "Duke" – DJ Spinna
5. "Rain Drops" – Freddie Joachim
6. "Hear It From You" – Freddie Joachim feat. Lauren Santiago
7. "Strictly Business" The Slipmat Brothers
8. "You Dig?" – Jenova 7
9. "Chalkboard" – Jazzual Suspects
10. "Ride" – Freddie Joachim
11. "Night Light" – PH-Wert
12. "Focus Point" – Fredfades & Eikrem
13. "Lil Boy" – Riccio
14. "Orange" – Emapea
15. "Bright Lights" – George Kelly feat. Andre Espeut & BnC (Instrumental)
16. "Economy Of Movement" – The Slipmat Brothers
17. "Body Boogie" – Sunner Soul
18. "Real Fungi" – Colossus
19. "Quiet Blues" – PH-Wert
20. "Basement Jazz" – Ed Wizard & Disco Double Dee
21. "Blue (Extended)" – The Deli
22. "Slow It Down" – Colossus
23. "I Still Don't (Pt. II)" – Larry de Kat
