= Jacques Martin (ice hockey) =

Canadian ice hockey coach

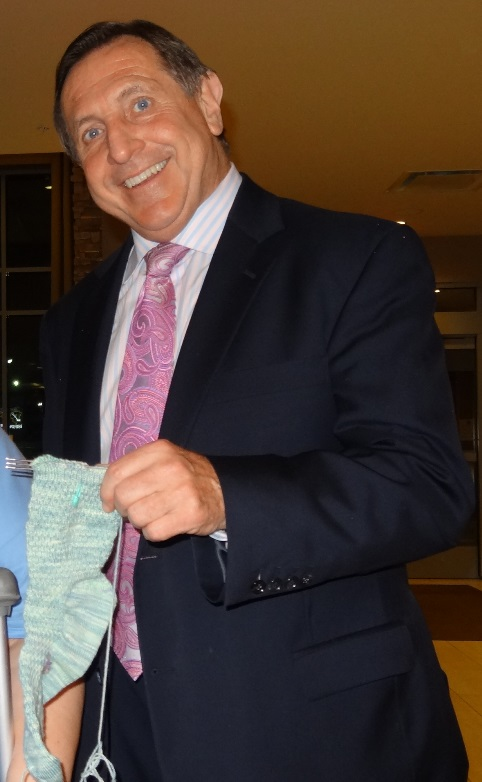
- Martin in 2013
- Born: October 1, 1952 (age 73) Rockland, Ontario, Canada
- Coached for: St. Louis Blues; Ottawa Senators; Florida Panthers; Montreal Canadiens
- Coaching career: 1982–present

Jacques Martin (born October 1, 1952) is a Canadian professional ice hockey coach. In the National Hockey League (NHL), he has served as head coach of the St. Louis Blues, Ottawa Senators, Montreal Canadiens and Florida Panthers. Martin also served as the general manager of the Panthers and has served as an assistant coach with the Canadian men's national ice hockey team. Martin is a Franco-Ontarian, and a two-time Stanley Cup champion.

== Personal life ==
Martin was born in Rockland, Ontario and raised in Saint-Pascal-Baylon, Ontario. He left the family farm at the age of 13 and moved to Ottawa to pursue his high school education. Martin attended post-secondary education at St. Lawrence University in New York State and at the University of Ottawa. While at St. Lawrence, Martin played goaltender for the college team, appearing in 28 games.

Martin taught at the Department of Physical Education at Algonquin College for seven years, during which time he coached the Rockland Nats and the Hawkesbury Hawks junior hockey teams. Martin runs the Jacques Martin Hockey School for children age 7 – 17 in Rigaud, Quebec. One of his daughters, Angela, is a public school teacher in Ottawa. His other daughter, Nathalee, works for the cheesemaker St-Albert.

== Coaching career ==
=== OHL ===
==== Peterborough Petes (1983–1985) ====
Martin served as an assistant coach with the Peterborough Petes of the Ontario Hockey League (OHL) in 1983–84, working under head coach Dick Todd. In his first season with the Petes, the team finished with a 43–23–4 record, finishing in third place in the Leyden Division. In the playoffs, the Petes swept the Cornwall Royals in the first round, before losing to the Toronto Marlboros in the second round.

Martin returned to the Petes in 1984–85 season, as the team finished with the best record in the Leyden Division with a 42–20–4 record. In the postseason, Peterborough made it to the J. Ross Robertson Cup finals, however, they lost to the Sault Ste. Marie Greyhounds in six games.

After the season, Martin left Peterborough and became the head coach of the Guelph Platers.

==== Guelph Platers (1985–1986) ====
Martin became the head coach of the Guelph Platers of the OHL in 1985–86, as he took over the rebuilding club, which missed the playoffs the previous season. Under Martin, the Platers finished second in the Emms Division with a 41–23–2 record, earning 84 points, which was a 37-point improvement for the team. In the playoffs, the Platers would win the J. Ross Robertson Cup, defeating the Belleville Bulls in the final round, to advance to the 1986 Memorial Cup, held in Portland, Oregon. In the Memorial Cup, the Platers earned a 2–1 record in the round-robin and advanced straight to the finals. In the final game of the tournament, Guelph defeated the Hull Olympiques by a score of 6–2 to capture the Memorial Cup. Martin won the Matt Leyden Trophy awarded to the best coach in the OHL.

Following the season, Martin left the Platers and became the head coach of the St. Louis Blues in the National Hockey League (NHL).

==== Kingston Frontenacs (2022–2023) ====
On September 16, 2022, the Kingston Frontenacs of the OHL named Martin to assume the role of Senior Advisor, marking Martin's first OHL role since 1986.

=== NHL ===
==== St. Louis Blues (1986–1988) ====
Martin took over as the head coach of the St. Louis Blues in 1986–87. On October 9, 1986, Martin coached and won his first career NHL game, defeating the Los Angeles Kings 4–3. Despite the team finishing the season with an under .500 record of 32–33–15, the Blues had the best record in the Norris Division. In the first round of the playoffs, the Blues were upset by the Toronto Maple Leafs, losing in six games.

The Blues had another mediocre regular season in 1987–88, as the club finished with a 34–38–8 record, finishing in second place in the Norris Division. In the postseason, the Blues defeated the Chicago Blackhawks in five games in the Norris Division semifinals, however, St. Louis lost to the Detroit Red Wings in five games in the division final. After the season, the Blues fired Martin.

==== Chicago Blackhawks (1988–1990) ====
Martin became an assistant coach under newly hired Chicago Blackhawks head coach Mike Keenan in 1988–89. In his first season with the Hawks, the club finished in the fourth and final playoff position in the Norris Division with a 27–41–12 record. In the postseason, the Blackhawks upset the division-winning Detroit Red Wings in the first round, defeating them in six games. In the Norris Division finals against Martin's former club, the St. Louis Blues, the Blackhawks continued their Cinderella run, defeating the favoured Blues in five games, advancing to the Campbell Conference final, against the Calgary Flames. The Blackhawks would lose to the Flames in five games, who went on to win the Stanley Cup.

The Blackhawks improved in the regular season in 1989–90, having the best record in the Norris Division with a 41–33–6, 88-point season. In the postseason, the Blackhawks defeated the Minnesota North Stars and St. Louis Blues to advance to the Campbell Conference finals for the second straight season. The Blackhawks' run would end, as the Edmonton Oilers defeated Chicago in six games.

After the season, Martin left the Blackhawks and joined the Quebec Nordiques as an assistant coach.

==== Quebec Nordiques/Colorado Avalanche (1990–1996) ====
Martin joined the Quebec Nordiques as an associate coach, working under newly hired head coach Dave Chambers, in 1990–91. The rebuilding Nordiques had a tough season, going 16–50–14, and missing the postseason.

Quebec saw some improvement in the 1991–92 season, as the club had a 20–48–12 record, however, the team once again finished in last place in the Adams Division, missing the playoffs. Head coach Dave Chambers was fired early in the season and was replaced with Pierre Pagé, as Martin was retained as the associate coach.

The Nordiques saw great improvement in 1992–93, as the club finished with a 47–27–10 record, earning 104 points, and second place in the Adams Division, qualifying for the postseason. In the first round, Quebec lost a thrilling series to the Montreal Canadiens in six games.

Martin was assigned to the Nordiques American Hockey League (AHL) affiliate, the Cornwall Aces, as head coach for the 1993–94 season. The Aces finished the year with a 33–36–11 record, third in the Southern Division, and a berth into the postseason. In the playoffs, the Aces defeated the Hamilton Canucks in the first round, followed by defeating the favoured Hershey Bears in seven games in the second round. The Aces then lost to the Moncton Hawks in the third round.

Martin returned to the Nordiques as an assistant coach under Marc Crawford in 1994–95. Quebec finished the season with the best record in the Eastern Conference, going 30–13–5 in the lockout-shortened season. In the playoffs, the Nordiques were upset by the eighth-seeded New York Rangers in six games. After the season, the Nordiques franchise relocated to Denver, Colorado and became the Colorado Avalanche.

Martin moved with the team to Colorado in 1995–96, however, he left the Avalanche on January 24, 1996, to become head coach of the Ottawa Senators.

==== Ottawa Senators (1996–2004) ====
Martin joined the Ottawa Senators midway through the 1995–96 season, taking over a club that had a record of 8–35–1. Martin coached his first game as the Senators' head coach on January 24, 1996, losing 4–3 to the Pittsburgh Penguins. After going winless in his first three games, he earned his first win with Ottawa on January 29, 1996, defeating his former team, the St. Louis Blues 4–2. The club improved slightly under Martin, as he led the team to a 10–24–4 record over their final 38 games, as Ottawa missed the playoffs. A highlight for the team was on April 13, 1996, when the Senators defeated the defending Stanley Cup champions, the New Jersey Devils 5–2, eliminating the Devils from the postseason, who needed a victory to make the playoffs.

The Senators improved greatly in 1996–97, as Ottawa finished the year with a 31–36–15 record, making the postseason for the first time in team history. In the postseason, the Senators took the heavily favoured Buffalo Sabres to overtime in game seven, before losing the game 1–0, and the series.

Ottawa continued to improve in 1997–98, as the team finished with a winning record for the first time, going 34–33–15, and making the postseason once again. In the playoffs, the eighth-seeded Senators stunned the New Jersey Devils in the first round, defeating them in six games. In the second round, Ottawa lost to the Washington Capitals in five games.

The Senators had the best record in the Northeast Division in 1998–99, going 44–23–15, earning 103 points. Martin was awarded the Jack Adams Award as the best head coach in the NHL. In the playoffs, the Senators were swept by the Buffalo Sabres, quickly ending their season.

Ottawa had another strong regular season in 1999–2000, going 41–28–11–2, finishing second in the Northeast Division. The Senators faced their provincial rivals, the Toronto Maple Leafs, in the first round of the playoffs, as the Leafs defeated the Senators in six games.

The club had a very strong season in 2000–01, as Ottawa finished with their second Northeast Division title in three years, going 48–21–9–4, earning 109 points, and second in the Eastern Conference. In the first round of the playoffs, the Senators faced the Toronto Maple Leafs for the second consecutive season, and once again, the Maple Leafs pulled off the upset, sweeping the heavily favoured Senators in four games.

The Senators struggled at times during the 2001–02, as the club dealt away top player Alexei Yashin to the New York Islanders during the off-season. Martin coached the Senators for their first 80 games, going 38–26–9–7. Martin stepped aside for the final two games, allowing assistant coach Roger Neilson to head coach the team, so Neilson could get to 1,000 games as a head coach. Martin returned to the Senators bench in the playoffs, as Ottawa faced the Philadelphia Flyers in the opening round of the playoffs. The Senators defeated the Flyers in five games, setting up a third straight meeting with the Toronto Maple Leafs in the second round. Ottawa took Toronto to a seventh game, however, the team once again lost to their provincial rivals.

Ottawa finished the 2002–03 with the best record in the league, winning the Presidents' Trophy for the first time in team history, with a 52–21–8–1 record, earning 113 points. In the postseason, the Senators defeated the New York Islanders in five games in the first round, followed by a six-game series win over the Philadelphia Flyers, as the team reached the Eastern Conference finals for the first time in club history. In the series against the New Jersey Devils, Ottawa fell behind three games to one, however, the Senators rallied to tie the series, setting up a seventh and deciding game. In the seventh game, the Senators lost the game, and series, on a late third period goal.

Heading into the 2003–04 season, the Senators were heavy favourites to win the Stanley Cup. The team had a very good regular season, going 43–23–10–6, earning 102 points, and fifth place in the Eastern Conference. In the first round of the playoffs, Ottawa faced the Toronto Maple Leafs for their fourth playoff meeting in five years. The Leafs managed to defeat the Senators again, winning the series in seven games.

On April 22, 2004, the Senators fired Martin.

==== Florida Panthers (2004–2009) ====
Martin was hired as head coach of the Florida Panthers on May 26, 2004. Due to the 2004–05 NHL lockout, the season was cancelled. Martin coached his first game with the Panthers on October 5, 2005, as the team defeated the Atlanta Thrashers 2–0. In his first year with the club in 2005–06, the Panthers went 37–34–11. However, the team failed to make the playoffs.

On September 3, 2006, the Panthers general manager, Mike Keenan, resigned from the position, and Martin took over the job while remaining the head coach. Florida once again missed the playoffs in 2006–07, as the club went 35–31–16. The Panthers continued to struggle in 2007–08, as Florida posted a 38–35–9 record, failing to make the playoffs for the third consecutive season under Martin. On April 11, 2008, the Panthers fired Martin as head coach, but he remained the general manager. Martin hired Peter DeBoer to become the head coach of the Panthers. As the general manager in 2008–09, the Panthers improved to a 41–30–11 record, earning 93 points, however, Florida once again failed to make the playoffs. On May 16, 2009, Martin resigned from his position.

==== Montreal Canadiens (2009–2011) ====
On June 1, 2009, Martin signed with the Montreal Canadiens to become their head coach, taking over the position from interim head coach Bob Gainey. Martin coached his first game with the Canadiens on October 1, defeating the Toronto Maple Leafs 4–3 in overtime. The team finished the 2009–10 season with a 39–33–10 record, making the playoffs as the eighth and final seed in the Eastern Conference. In the postseason, the Canadiens upset the top-seeded Washington Capitals in seven games in the first round. Montreal continued their playoff run by defeating the favoured Pittsburgh Penguins in seven games in the second round, reaching the Eastern Conference finals against the Philadelphia Flyers. The Canadiens struggled against Philadelphia, as they were shutout in three of their four losses, as the club lost in five games.

The Canadiens had a solid regular season in 2010–11 season, going 44–30–8, earning 96 points, an eight-point improvement over the previous season. In the playoffs, the Canadiens lost to their archrivals, the Boston Bruins in the first round, losing game seven in overtime to be eliminated.

Montreal struggled to begin the 2011–12 season, as the team had a 13–12–9 record in their first 34 games. On December 17, 2011, the Canadiens fired Martin and replaced him with assistant coach Randy Cunneyworth, who was once Martin's captain on the Ottawa Senators, on an interim basis.

==== Pittsburgh Penguins (2013–2020) ====
Martin joined the Pittsburgh Penguins as an assistant coach under Dan Bylsma for the 2013–14 season, as he was hired for the position on August 9, 2013. In his first season with the club, the Penguins recorded a 51–24–7 record, earning 109 points, finishing in first place in the Metropolitan Division. The Penguins defeated the Columbus Blue Jackets in six games in the first round, however, they lost to the New York Rangers in seven games in the second round. On July 23, 2014, the Penguins announced that Martin was promoted to senior advisor of hockey operations. On December 12, 2015, he was named assistant coach after head coach Mike Johnston and Gary Agnew were fired. On June 12, 2016, he won his first Stanley Cup in a 4–2 series win against the San Jose Sharks (and nearly dropped it during the on-ice celebration). On June 11, 2017, Martin won the Cup for the second time as the Penguins defeated the Nashville Predators in a 4–2 series win.

On August 12, 2020, the Penguins announced that Martin's contract would not be renewed, ending his tenure with the team.

==== New York Rangers (2020–2021) ====
On August 31, 2020, the New York Rangers named Martin as an assistant coach. In the 2020–21 season, the Rangers finished with a 27–23–6 record, earning 60 points and fifth place in the East Division, missing the postseason. On May 12, 2021, the club fired Martin after one season with the team.

==== Return to Ottawa (2023–present) ====
On December 6, 2023, the Ottawa Senators named Martin to assume the role of Senior Advisor to the coaching staff. He was subsequently promoted to interim head coach December 18, after the firing of D. J. Smith. Under Martin, the Senators posted a record of 26–26–4 in the 2023–24 season, as Ottawa failed to qualify for the post-season. Following the season, Martin was succeeded by Travis Green after the season and he was named as the senior advisor to the coaching staff.

== Head coaching record ==
=== NHL ===
Team	Year	Regular season							Postseason			
Team	Year	G	W	L	T	OTL	Pts	Finish	W	L	Win %	Result
STL	1986–87	80	32	33	15	—	79	1st in Norris	2	4	.333	Lost in division semifinals (TOR)
STL	1987–88	80	34	38	8	—	76	2nd in Norris	5	5	.500	Lost in division finals (DET)
OTT	1995–96	38	10	24	4	—	(41)	6th in Northeast	—	—	—	Missed playoffs
OTT	1996–97	82	31	36	15	—	77	3rd in Northeast	3	4	.429	Lost in conference quarterfinals (BUF)
OTT	1997–98	82	34	33	15	—	83	5th in Northeast	5	6	.455	Lost in conference semifinals (WSH)
OTT	1998–99	82	44	23	15	—	103	1st in Northeast	0	4	.000	Lost in conference quarterfinals (BUF)
OTT	1999–2000	82	41	28	11	2	95	2nd in Northeast	2	4	.333	Lost in conference quarterfinals (TOR)
OTT	2000–01	82	48	21	9	4	109	1st in Northeast	0	4	.000	Lost in conference quarterfinals (TOR)
OTT	2001–02	80	38	26	9	7	94	3rd in Northeast	7	5	.583	Lost in conference semifinals (TOR)
OTT	2002–03	82	52	21	8	1	113	1st in Northeast	11	7	.611	Lost in conference finals (NJD)
OTT	2003–04	82	43	23	10	6	102	3rd in Northeast	3	4	.429	Lost in conference quarterfinals (TOR)
FLA	2005–06	82	37	34	—	11	85	4th in Southeast	—	—	—	Missed playoffs
FLA	2006–07	82	35	31	—	16	86	4th in Southeast	—	—	—	Missed playoffs
FLA	2007–08	82	38	35	—	9	85	3rd in Southeast	—	—	—	Missed playoffs
MTL	2009–10	82	39	33	—	10	88	4th in Northeast	9	10	.474	Lost in Conference Finals (PHI)
MTL	2010–11	82	44	30	—	8	96	2nd in Northeast	3	4	.429	Lost in Conference Quarterfinals (BOS)
MTL	2011–12	32	13	12	—	7	(33)	(fired)	—	—	—	—
OTT	2023–24	56	26	26	—	4	(78)	7th in Atlantic	—	—	—	Missed playoffs
OTT total		748	367	261	96	24			31	38	.449	8 playoff appearances
FLA total		246	110	100	—	36			—	—	—	0 playoff appearances
MTL total		196	96	75	—	25			12	14	.462	2 playoff appearances
STL total		160	66	71	23	—			7	9	.438	2 playoff appearances
Total		1,320	639	497	119	85			50	62	.446	12 playoff appearances

=== OHL ===
Team	Year	Regular season						Postseason
Team	Year	G	W	L	T	Pts	Finish	Result
GUE	1985–86	66	41	23	2	84	2nd in Emms	Won J. Ross Robertson Cup (BEL); Won Memorial Cup (HUL)
Total		66	41	23	2	84		1 J. Ross Robertson Cup win 1 Memorial Cup win

Awards and achievements
Preceded by Pat Burns	Winner of the Jack Adams Award; 1999	Succeeded by Joel Quenneville
Sporting positions
Preceded by Jacques Demers	Head coach of the St. Louis Blues; 1986–1988	Succeeded by Brian Sutter
Preceded by Dave Allison; D. J. Smith	Head coach of the Ottawa Senators; 1996–2004; 2023–2024 (interim)	Succeeded by Bryan Murray; Travis Green
Preceded by John Torchetti	Head coach of the Florida Panthers; 2004–2008	Succeeded by Peter DeBoer
Preceded by Mike Keenan	General manager of the Florida Panthers; 2006–2009	Succeeded by Randy Sexton
Preceded by Bob Gainey (interim)	Head coach of the Montreal Canadiens; 2009–2011	Succeeded by Randy Cunneyworth (interim)
