= J Boogie =

American record producer

Justin Boland, also known as J Boogie, is a DJ, music producer, radio host, music director and music curator from San Francisco with over 25 years of experience in the music industry.

He is the Head of Hip-Hop and R&B Programming at Pandora Media. As a curator, he's responsible for the hip-hop and R&B libraries, editorial curation and programming Pandora's genre stations and Project Management for Pandora's programming team. He has also worked for Beats Music, Pulselocker, Spinner.com/AOL Music, Amoeba Music, KUSF and more.

He is signed to the Om Records label, and has three full-length albums as well as several DJ mix CDs. He has also been featured on several compilations and remix projects.

His style includes a mixture of downtempo, hip-hop, funk, dub, soul, afrobeats, Latin, dancehall, and electronic.

He was the co-creator of the radio show Beatsauce, along with DJs Raw B, and Wisdom on KUSF, which was awarded "Best hip-hop show" by citysearch.com, the San Francisco Bay Guardian, and SF Weekly. He was also one of the long time residents at Dub Mission, a weekly reggae/roots party in San Francisco at the Elbo Room.

== J Boogie's Dubtronic Science ==
His band, J Boogie's Dubtronic Science, features himself DJing with FX and drum machines, plus a few other frequent contributors. They play a mix of styles and feature members of Jazz Mafia on horns, an Afro Latin percussionist, Aima the Dreamer, Deuce Eclipse and Rich Armstrong on vocals, and sometimes special guests such as Zion I or Lyrics Born. Although Dubtronic Science uses production techniques popularized in dub music, the album does not fall under that genre.

== DJ work ==
J Boogie began DJing in 1991. He started on the radio at KUSF. When DJing, he integrates various techniques and musical genres including dub, soul, hip–hop, reggae, funk, Latin, afrobeats, bhangra, dancehall, disco, electro and house.

J Boogie has DJed around the world at places like APT, Turntables on the Hudson, Deep Space NYC, 18th Street Lounge, Halo, Temple Bar, Afro Funke, Root Down, Firecracker, The Do Over and Deep LA. He has also been on tour with Widespread Panic, Bassnectar and Spearhead, and has opened for George Clinton & Parliament Funkadelic, Mark Farina, Louie Vega, DJ Krush, Kruder & Dorfmeister, Breakestra, RJD2, PPP, and Nickodemus.

He has also performed at the music festivals Bumbershoot, Bonnaroo, SXSW, WMC, Harmony Fest, Earthdance, High Sierra, Power to the Peaceful and Burning Man.

J Boogie's self-titled debut album was released in 2003, featuring artists like Goapele, Gina Rene, People Under The Stairs, Capital A and Tony Moses. His next release on Om Records, Live in the Mix, was a mix CD featuring two new original songs, "You're a Murdera" featuring Deuce Eclipse and Zion I, and "Purple Perpendicular Phonics", featuring P.E.A.C.E. and Raashan Ahmad.

His third release on Om, Soul Vibrations, features The Rebirth, Rich Medina, Lyrics Born, Ohmega Watts, Zion I, Crown City Rockers, Jennifer Johns, Deuce Eclipse, Capitol A, The Mamaz, Jazz Mafia, Lunar Heights, Jrod Indigo, Tony Moses and more.

J Boogie has also released several mixtapes and remixes. His has remixed DJ Vadim, Alice Russell, Miguel Migs, Karsh Kale, The Rebirth, Zeph & Azeem, Mark Farina, Zion I, Goapele and Soulstice. His mix CDs are Leftism 1 & 2 with Sake One, In the Mood I & II, Universal B Breaks, Electro Soul, Live in the Bedroom, and Live on the Dancefloor. He has been featured on compilations like Mark Farina's Mushroom Jazz 5 & 6, the Om Lounge series, and Ubiquity compilations and remix projects.

He has remixed/dubbed:

- Mark Farina
- Asiah and DJ Tonk
- Romanowski
- Soulstice
- Colossal
- DJ Sun ("Para")

He has been remixed/dubbed by:

- King Kooba
- Kaskade
- People Under The Stairs

He has collaborated with / featured:

- Talib Kweli
- Mark Farina
- People Under The Stairs
- Deuce Eclipse
- Zion I
- Goapele
- Capitol A
- Raashan Ahmad Morris
- Omega y su Mambo Violento
- P.E.A.C.E.
- Gina Rene
- Mike Biggz
- Lunar Heights

== Discography ==
12" singles:

- "Try Me"
- "Purple Perpendicular Phonics"
- "You're the Murdera" (B-side)
- "Inferno"

Albums:

- J Boogie's Dubtronic Science (2003)
- Live in the Mix (2005)
- Soul Vibrations (2008)
- Soul Vibrations: Dub Remixes (2009), digital release only
