= Roger Neilson =

Canadian ice hockey coach (1934–2003)

CM Roger Neilson
- Hockey Hall of Fame, 2002 (Builder)
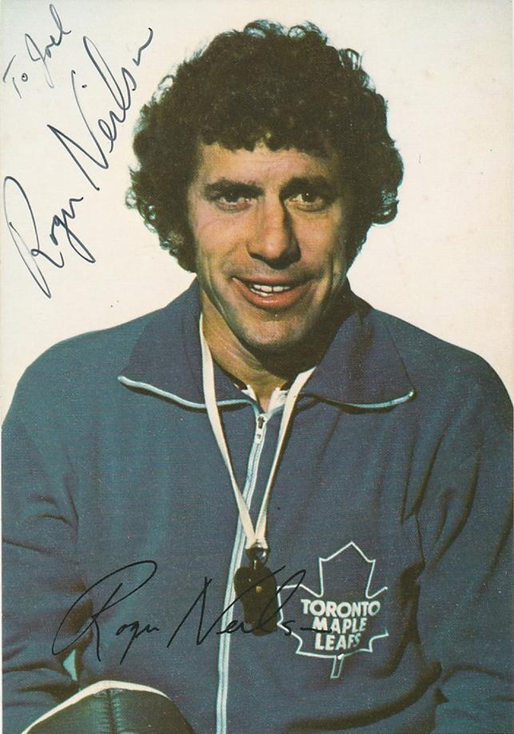
- Born: June 16, 1934 Toronto, Ontario, Canada
- Died: June 21, 2003 (aged 69) Peterborough, Ontario, Canada
- Coached for: Toronto Maple Leafs; Buffalo Sabres; Vancouver Canucks; Los Angeles Kings; New York Rangers; Florida Panthers; Philadelphia Flyers; Ottawa Senators
- Coaching career: 1966–2003

Roger Paul Neilson CM (June 16, 1934 – June 21, 2003) was a Canadian professional ice hockey coach, most notably in the NHL, where he served with eight teams. Known as "Captain Video" because of his technological contributions to the game, he is a member of the Hockey Hall of Fame in the builder category. Alongside his decorated coaching abilities, Neilson is commonly remembered today for his many antics which resulted in the creation of several NHL rules.

Born in Toronto, Neilson attended a public high school, North Toronto Collegiate Institute. Neilson's coaching career began as a student at McMaster University in Hamilton, Ontario, where he continued to coach until graduation with a degree in physical education in both hockey and baseball.

== Coaching career ==
Neilson's coaching career began in 1966 as head coach of the Ontario Hockey League's Peterborough Petes, then the junior farm team of the Montreal Canadiens, and he remained for 10 years in Peterborough, Ontario, where he maintained a home until his death. He also worked at the University of Windsor with a summer hockey camp program, which led to camps from Port Hope, Ontario to Israel.

Neilson moved into professional hockey coaching with the Dallas Black Hawks in the Central Hockey League in 1976–77.

Neilson's entry into the National Hockey League (NHL) came in 1977 with the Toronto Maple Leafs, when he was hired to replace Red Kelly as the head coach of the team. Neilson coached the Toronto Maple Leafs (1977–79), the Buffalo Sabres (1979–81, associate and head coach), Vancouver Canucks (1981–84, assistant and head coach), Los Angeles Kings (1983–84), Chicago Blackhawks (1984–87, assistant), New York Rangers (1989–93), Florida Panthers (1993–95), Philadelphia Flyers (1997–2000), and for two games with the Ottawa Senators in April 2002.

Neilson's tenure with Toronto lasted until 1979, when Neilson was fired as head coach of the Maple Leafs by owner Harold Ballard. There was outrage throughout the players, media, and general public. Ballard then relented, but wanted Neilson to enter the next game with a paper bag over his head as "the mystery coach", but Neilson refused and coached the next game as if nothing had happened. He coached the 1980-81 season with the Buffalo Sabres but elected to leave the team on mutual agreement due to differences with general manager Scotty Bowman.

Neilson was initially an assistant coach with Vancouver, but he took over as head coach after Harry Neale was suspended for taking part in an altercation with fans during a brawl against the Quebec Nordiques. When the team went unbeaten in the next seven games, he was given the job permanently. It was in his new capacity that Neilson led the team on its run to the 1982 Stanley Cup Finals.

Neilson worked for the Edmonton Oilers as a video analyst during the 1984 Stanley Cup Playoffs, culminating in the Oilers' first Stanley Cup championship, and the Chicago Blackhawks as an assistant to head coach Bob Pulford from 1984 to 1987. From 1995 to 1997, he was an assistant coach for the St. Louis Blues. During the 1987–88 and 1988–89 seasons, Neilson did not coach but served as a color commentator for TSN with Jim Hughson and Gary Green.

Neilson was hired by the New York Rangers in 1989. The 1991-92 team, headlined by Mark Messier and Brian Leetch, recorded 105 points to receive the Presidents' Trophy, the first time the Rangers were the best team in the NHL in 50 years. In a playoff slightly delayed a few days by the 1992 NHL strike, the Rangers lost to the Pittsburgh Penguins in the Division Finals. Neilson's reputation as a so-called old school coach was put under a microscope in Game 2 of the series, when Rangers player Adam Graves fractured the left metacarpal bone of Penguins superstar Mario Lemieux with a two-handed baseball swing of his stick. Graves stated that he was swinging on the glove to loosen his grip on the stick to deal with the puck, which reflected Neilson's belief for one to go for the hands. Neilson later said he did not see the incident, although it happened in front of his team's benches.

"Yes, no question about it. I kill penalties, too. I hit the gloves, also, once in a while. But to take a swing like he did ... that certainly came from the coach." Lemieux said after the injury. He added, "Certainly a contract was on me that game. I'm not saying Roger Neilson told Graves to go after me, but he told his players to go after me."

Graves was assessed only a two-minute minor penalty on the play. He was allowed to play in Game 3, in which he scored the first goal of a 6–5 overtime victory. Two days after the incident, at the league's disciplinary hearing, it decided to suspend Graves four games. The Penguins rallied to win their next seven games, the series, and the Stanley Cup Finals. The following season saw the Rangers fire Neilson after 40 games as the team became the first defending Presidents' Trophy winner to miss the playoffs.

He was the first coach of the Florida Panthers in 1993, and one of the key sticking points is that he insisted on having training camp take place in his hometown of Peterborough (where he also had a hockey school). In their first season, the team went 33-34-17 and recorded 83 points while Neilson finished fourth in voting for the Jack Adams Award. However Neilson was fired after the 1994–95 season with a year remaining on his contract, with general manager Bryan Murray stating, "I want to emphasize that Roger Nielson is not being released because of his past performances for the Florida Panthers. Roger's record with the Panthers was a good one and he has helped establish a solid foundation for this franchise. However, we have decided that a look toward the future of the franchise is crucial at this time. To make the progress we want, for the long term good of the Panthers, we feel changes have to be made." In the first season after Neilson was let go, Doug MacLean coached the Panthers to the Stanley Cup Final, arguably on the foundation laid by Neilson.

After five seasons with the Rangers and Panthers, Neilson led the Flyers to first place in the Eastern Conference in the 1999–2000 season. With the Flyers leading in the conference standings at the midseason break, Neilson earned the honor to coach the Eastern Conference squad in the All-Star Game. Previously, based on his performance with the Canucks, he had coached the Campbell Conference All-Stars at the 1983 All-Star Game. But a Neilson-coached team fell short of expectations once again, as the Flyers were ousted by the New Jersey Devils in seven games in the Eastern Conference championship round.

=== Retirement from hockey ===
On February 20, 2000, Neilson went on medical leave for cancer treatment, and assistant coach Craig Ramsay took over in his absence. On April 10, Neilson told General Manager Bobby Clarke that he was ready to return to the team, but Clarke insisted on additional medical clearance before he returned. In an interview, Neilson said he had been "treated like a king" and referred to Clarke as a friend. All the while, Ramsay repeatedly said that he would return to assistant coach as soon as Flyers' management approved Neilson to return as coach. Neilson was ultimately informed that he had been permanently replaced by Ramsay.

Neilson's dismissal by Clarke was widely lamented by fans and media as lacking class and respect. Neilson's doctors advised the Flyers that he lacked the strength to perform his duties as head coach. Neilson insisted on trying to return at the end of the first round of the playoffs, but Clarke refused. He even tried to defend his decision in the press, stating, "Roger got cancer – that wasn't our fault. We didn't tell him to go get cancer. It's too bad that he did. We feel sorry for him, but then he went goofy on us."

Neilson was then hired as an assistant coach for the Senators. For the last two games of the 2001–02 season, which were inconsequential to the standings, head coach Jacques Martin stepped away from the bench, allowing Neilson to take the reins and become the ninth man to coach 1,000 games along with the distinction of having served as a head coach for eight different teams. The following season, the Senators won the Presidents' Trophy as the regular season and advanced to the Eastern Conference Finals. It was public knowledge that Neilson's cancer was terminal when the Senators were ousted in a seven-game series.

Neilson's overall regular-season record was 460 wins, 378 losses, 159 ties, and 3 overtime losses.

=== Coaching legacy ===
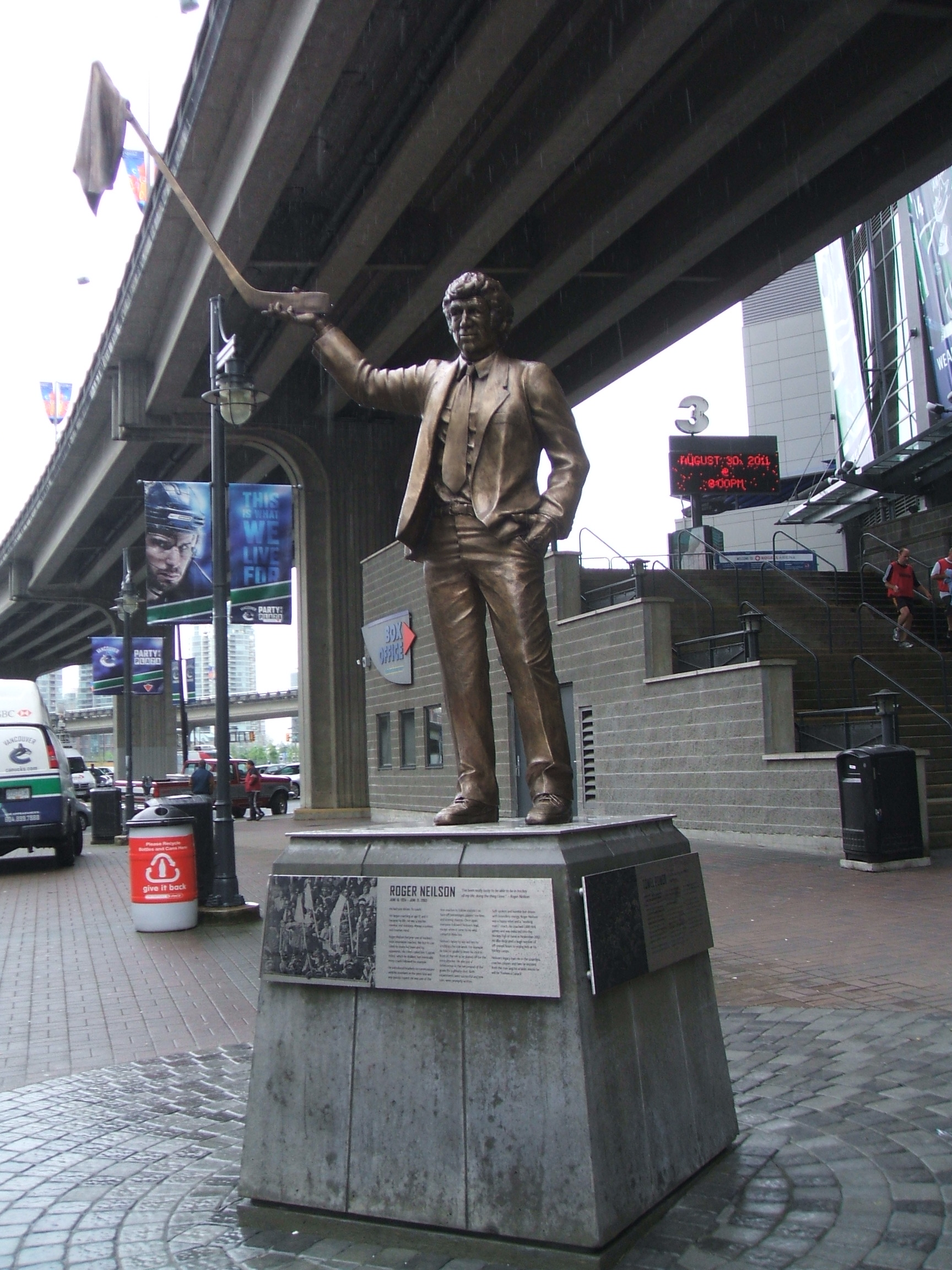
Statue of Roger Neilson at Rogers Arena in Vancouver.

Neilson dedicated his entire life to coaching and hockey. He had no family ties and would stay up late into the night watching video and analyzing games.

Among his most well-known innovations was the use of videotape to analyze other teams, leading to the nickname "Captain Video". He was also the first to use microphone headsets to communicate with his assistant coaches.

In situations where the face-off was in the opposition's end and there were three or less seconds to go in the first and/or second period, Neilson would pull his goaltender for an extra attacker for a potential shot on net off the ensuing face-off. His reasoning was that if the other team gained possession of the puck, it would be virtually impossible for the opposition to score from their end in the mere seconds that were left. No other coach would consider this radical move, and it was indicative of his innovative thinking.

Neilson was well known for closely reading the rule book with the intent of exploiting loopholes. During one particular game in his first season coaching the Petes, he was down two men in a five on three situation for the last minute of the game. Realizing that more penalties could not be served under the existing rules, Neilson intentionally put too many men on the ice every ten seconds. The referees stopped the play and a faceoff was held, relieving pressure on the defence. In addition, Neilson also took advantage of fans throwing objects onto the ice to deliberately cause stoppages of play late in a game. After these displays, the rules were changed so that a call for too many men on the ice in a five on three situation, or a delay-of-game penalty in a five on three situation, or any deliberate act to stop play (i.e., objects thrown on the ice, or the net being intentionally dislodged) in the last two minutes of regulation or in overtime now results in a penalty shot.

Neilson also discovered that if he put a defenceman in net instead of a goaltender during a penalty shot, the defenceman could rush the attacker and cut down the latter's angle of shot, greatly reducing the chances of a goal. In 1968, he used this information in an OHL game between Neilson's Peterborough Petes and the opposing Toronto Marlboros. Neilson replaced Petes goaltender Pete Kostek with defenseman Ron Stackhouse. Stackhouse successfully blocked Frank Hamill's penalty shot attempt by charging out as soon as Hamill crossed the blue line. The rules now state that a team must use a goaltender in net for a penalty shot and that the goaltender cannot leave the crease until the skater has touched the puck.

One game during a time-out, Neilson told his goaltender, "...when we pull you, just leave your goal stick lying in the crease." When the other team gained possession, they sent the puck the length of the ice toward the open net, only to deflect wide when it hit the goal stick lying in the crease. The rule was changed the next season so that a goal would be awarded in such a situation.

Neilson also broke the rules, in a sense, when he did not like what was happening on the ice. As the Canucks coach during game two of the 1982 Campbell Conference Final playoff series against the Chicago Blackhawks, he felt his team was unfairly penalized on several occasions during the third period. He took a trainer's white towel and held it on a hockey stick, as if to wave a white flag. Three other Canucks players did the same thing, and all were ejected from the game. By doing this, Neilson inadvertently started an NHL tradition. Canucks fans waved white towels by the thousands at the next game, a playoff tradition that continues to this day and is widely copied by other hockey teams.

== Life after hockey ==
Neilson was awarded an honorary Doctor of Laws by McMaster University in 2001 (see below). He was inducted into the Hockey Hall of Fame as a builder in November 2002. He was also appointed as a Member of the Order of Canada {CM} in 2002. The City of Peterborough renamed George Street South Roger Neilson Way opposite the Memorial Centre Arena in 2003; the address of the Arena was supposed to be changed to 1 Roger Neilson Way. The Ottawa Senators have named their coaches office at Scotiabank Place The Roger Neilson Room. The City of Ottawa renamed their Minor Peewee AAA Hockey Division after Neilson in 2005. Also in 2005, the Ontario Hockey League created an award for the top academic player attending college or university and named it the Roger Neilson Memorial Award.

In 1999, Neilson was diagnosed with multiple myeloma, which spread to become skin cancer in 2001. He died on June 21, 2003, five days after his 69th birthday. The funeral was held in Northview Pentecostal Church in Peterborough.

Shortly after his death, the Ottawa Senators Foundation announced plans to build "Roger's House" (French: "La maison de Roger"), later renamed Roger Neilson House, a paediatric palliative care facility built in his memory on the grounds of the Children's Hospital of Eastern Ontario in Ottawa. The building was opened on April 21, 2006, by the Premier of Ontario, Dalton McGuinty.

In September 2004, Roger Neilson Public School, a new elementary school in Peterborough, opened. The name was chosen because of Neilson's commitment to teaching, which exemplified the qualities of the Character Education program of the Kawartha Pine Ridge District School Board.

On April 7, 2011, Rogers Arena in Vancouver commemorated Neilson's contribution to the NHL and Vancouver Canucks, in particular to the tradition he created during the 1982 playoff series with the Chicago Blackhawks, later named "Towel Power", by erecting a large statue of him in the courtyard of Rogers Arena.

The Florida Panthers dedicated the press box to Neilson, their first head coach, in 2013.

== Coaching record ==
Team	Year	Regular season							Postseason			
Team	Year	G	W	L	T	OTL	Pts	Finish	W	L	Win %	Result
TOR	1977–78	80	41	29	10	—	92	3rd in Adams	6	7	.462	Lost in Semifinals (MTL)
TOR	1978–79	80	34	33	13	—	81	3rd in Adams	2	4	.333	Lost in quarterfinals (MTL)
TOR Total		160	75	62	23	—	173		8	11	.421	2 playoff appearances
BUF	1980–81	80	39	20	21	—	99	1st in Adams	4	4	.500	Lost in quarterfinals (MIN)
BUF Total		80	39	20	21	—	99	1 division title	4	4	.500	1 playoff appearance
VAN	1981–82	5	4	0	1	—	(77)	2nd in Smythe	11	6	.647	Lost in Stanley Cup Final (NYI)
VAN	1982–83	80	30	35	15	—	75	3rd in Smythe	1	3	.250	Lost in Division semifinals (CGY)
VAN	1983–84	48	17	26	5	—	(73)	(fired)	—	—	—	—
VAN Total		133	51	61	21	—	123		12	9	.571	2 playoff appearances
LAK	1983–84	28	8	17	3	—	(59)	5th in Smythe				Did not qualify
LAK Total		28	8	17	3	—	19					
NYR	1989–90	80	36	31	13	—	85	1st in Patrick	5	5	.500	Lost in Division finals (WSH)
NYR	1990–91	80	36	31	13	—	85	2nd in Patrick	2	4	.333	Lost in Division semifinals (WSH)
NYR	1991–92	80	50	25	5	—	105	1st in Patrick	6	7	.462	Lost in Division finals (PIT)
NYR	1992–93	40	19	17	4	—	(79)	(fired)	—	—	—	—
NYR Total		280	141	104	35	—	317	2 division titles	13	16	.448	3 playoff appearances
FLA	1993–94	84	33	34	17	—	83	5th in Atlantic	—	—	—	Did not qualify
FLA	1994–95	48	20	22	6	—	46	5th in Atlantic	—	—	—	Did not qualify
FLA Total		132	53	56	23	—	129		—	—	—	
PHI	1997–98	21	10	9	2	—	(95)	2nd in Atlantic	1	4		Lost in Conference quarterfinals (BUF)
PHI	1998–99	82	37	26	19	—	93	2nd in Atlantic	2	4		Lost in Conference quarterfinals (TOR)
PHI	1999–2000	82	45	22	12	3	105	1st in Atlantic	11	7	.611	Lost in Conference finals (NJ)
PHI Total		185	92	57	33	3	220		14	15	.483	3 playoff appearances
OTT	2001–02	2	1	1	0	0	(94)	(Interim)	—	—	—	—
OTT Total		2	1	1	0	0	2		—	—	—	
Total		1,000	460	378	159	3	1082	3 division titles	51	55	.481	11 playoff appearances

Preceded by Red Kelly	Head coach of the Toronto Maple Leafs; 1977–79	Succeeded by Floyd Smith
Preceded by Scotty Bowman	Head coach of the Buffalo Sabres; 1980–81	Succeeded by Jim Roberts
Preceded by Harry Neale	Head coach of the Vancouver Canucks; 1981–84	Succeeded by Harry Neale
Preceded by Rogie Vachon	Head coach of the Los Angeles Kings; 1984	Succeeded by Pat Quinn
Preceded by Phil Esposito	Head coach of the New York Rangers; 1989–93	Succeeded by Ron Smith
Preceded by Position created	Head coach of the Florida Panthers; 1993–95	Succeeded by Doug MacLean
Preceded by Wayne Cashman	Head coach of the Philadelphia Flyers; 1997–2000	Succeeded by Craig Ramsay
Preceded by Jacques Martin	Head coach of the Ottawa Senators; April 2002 (2 games)	Succeeded by Jacques Martin
