= List of Ottawa Senators head coaches =

The Ottawa Senators are a professional ice hockey team based in Ottawa, Ontario, Canada. The team is a member of the Atlantic Division of the Eastern Conference of the National Hockey League (NHL). The Senators, named after the original Ottawa Senators, began play in the NHL as an expansion team in 1992. Having first played at the Ottawa Civic Centre, the Senators have played their home games at the Canadian Tire Centre, which was first named The Palladium, since 1996. The team has been to the Stanley Cup Final in the 2006–07 season, but lost to the Anaheim Ducks in five games. Travis Green was named head coach of the Ottawa Senators in 2024. Green replaced Jacques Martin, who served as interim coach after D.J. Smith was fired. Green is currently signed to a four-year contract.

== Summary ==
The modern Senators' first head coach was Rick Bowness. Bowness was a former NHL head coach for the Boston Bruins. Bowness coached for four seasons until November 1996, when he was fired by then-GM Randy Sexton, let go in a dispute over the playing time of Alexandre Daigle, who was not playing well. Bowness' successor, Dave Allison, the then-coach of the Senators' farm team the Prince Edward Island Senators of the American Hockey League (AHL) had no success with Ottawa. The club won only two of 25 games during his tenure. The club, in turmoil at the time, replaced GM Sexton with Pierre Gauthier, who fired Allison. Allison is the only person to have each spent his entire NHL head coaching career with the Senators.

One of Gauthier's first moves as GM was the hiring of Jacques Martin. Martin, who coached the Senators for nine seasons, is the franchise's all-time leader for the most regular-season games coached (692), the most regular-season game wins (341), the most playoff games coached (69), and the most playoff-game wins (31). Martin was the first Senators coach to win the Jack Adams Award, having won it in the 1998–99 season. Although the club had regular-season success with Martin, he never led the team to much playoff success, and he was fired after the team lost in the first round of the 2004 playoffs.

During Martin's tenure, the club hired Roger Neilson, a long-time NHL head coach, as an assistant coach. For the last two games of the 2001–02 season. Neilson was officially made the head coach so that he could become the ninth head coach in NHL history to coach 1,000 games. Martin returned to head coach the team for the playoffs. Neilson would be the assistant coach for Ottawa for one more season, before succumbing to cancer in 2003. The club won the Presidents' Trophy in 2003 for the best regular-season record in the league and made it to the Eastern Conference Finals before losing to the eventual Stanley Cup champion New Jersey Devils. Neilson is the only Senators head coach to have been elected into the Hockey Hall of Fame, elected as a builder.

Martin's successor was Bryan Murray. Murray, at the time of his hiring in 2004, was the general manager of the Mighty Ducks of Anaheim. He joined the Senators to return home, having been born in nearby Shawville, Quebec. The first season of Murray's term was lost to the lockout, but when the team returned to play it continued its winning ways. Murray coached the team for two seasons, and the club made it to the 2007 Stanley Cup Final, the contemporary Senators' first appearance in the Final. After the Final, Murray's contract to coach was due to expire. GM Muckler's contract had one more season to run and Muckler was expected to retire after that one further season. Rather than let Murray go, team owner Eugene Melnyk and team president Roy Mlakar decided to promote Murray to GM, replacing Muckler.

Murray promoted assistant John Paddock to head coach for the 2007–08 season. The club started well, but the team declined to the point where Murray fired Paddock after 64 games. Paddock's overall record of 36–22-6 was good, but the club was playing below .500 since a 15–2 start to the season (.882 win percentage), and there were controversies surrounding goaltender Ray Emery and Wade Redden. Murray returned to the bench to guide the Senators for the rest of the season and the playoffs, where the team lost in the first round.

For the 2008–09 season, the Senators made several personnel moves and chose Craig Hartsburg, a former NHL head coach, as head coach to promote 'accountability' on the part of the players. However, the team continued its sub .500 record and Hartsburg was let go after only 48 games with a record of 17–24–7.

Cory Clouston was named the head coach on February 2, 2009. Clouston was already a part of the Senators organization as head coach of the Binghamton Senators. Clouston served as head coach for two further seasons, before being fired on April 9, 2011. The team made the playoffs in his first full season of coaching, but slid to the bottom of the standings in his second season.

Paul MacLean was hired on June 14, 2011. MacLean, a former NHL player, had previously been an assistant coach with Anaheim and Detroit. MacLean had previously worked with Murray in Anaheim. During his term, MacLean was twice nominated for the Jack Adams Trophy for coach of the year, winning it for the 2012–13 season. MacLean was fired on December 8, 2014, and replaced by his assistant Dave Cameron.

After the 2015–16 season, in which the Senators failed to make the playoffs, Dave Cameron was fired and replaced by Guy Boucher. Boucher guided the club in its first season to a berth in the Eastern Conference Final, losing in overtime in the seventh game to the eventual Stanley Cup champion Pittsburgh Penguins. In his second season, the team nosedived to 30th-place overall. In his third season, Boucher was fired prior on March 1, 2019, with the club in 31st-place overall. His associate coach, Marc Crawford was named as interim head coach. D. J. Smith was then hired as the permanent head coach on May 23, 2019, for the 2019–20 season. After four further seasons without a playoff appearance, capped by an 11–15–0 start to the 2023–24 season, Smith was fired on December 18, 2023, and replaced on an interim basis by former Senators head coach Jacques Martin. After the conclusion of the season, Travis Green was hired as the team's new head coach.

== Key ==
#	Number of coaches^{[a]}
GC	Games coached
W	Wins = 2 points
L	Losses = 0 points
T	Ties = 1 point
OT	Overtime/shootout losses = 1 point^{[b]}
PTS	Points
Win%	Winning percentage
*	Spent entire NHL head coaching career with the Senators
†	Elected to the Hockey Hall of Fame as a builder

== Head coaches ==
Note: Statistics are correct through the 2025–26 season

#	Name	Term^{[c]}	Regular season						Playoffs				Achievements	Reference
#	Name	Term^{[c]}	GC	W	L	T/OT	PTS	Win%	GC	W	L	Win%	Achievements	Reference
1	Rick Bowness	1992–1995	235	39	178	18	96	.204	—	—	—	—		
2	Dave Allison*	1995–1996	25	2	22	1	5	.100	—	—	—	—		
3	Jacques Martin	1996–2002	528	246	191	91	583	.552	44	17	27	.386	1998–99 Jack Adams Award winner	
4	Roger Neilson†^{[d]}	2002	2	1	1	0	2	.500	—	—	—	—		
—	Jacques Martin	2002–2004	164	95	44	25	215	.655	25	14	11	.560		
5	Bryan Murray	2005–2007	164	100	46	18	218	.665	30	18	12	.600		
6	John Paddock	2007–2008	64	36	22	6	78	.609	—	—	—	—		
—	Bryan Murray	2008	18	7	9	2	16	.444	4	0	4	.000		
7	Craig Hartsburg	2008–2009	48	17	24	7	41	.427	—	—	—	—		
8	Cory Clouston*	2009–2011	198	95	83	20	210	.530	6	2	4	.333		
9	Paul MacLean*	2011–2014	238	114	90	35	263	.553	17	8	9	.471	2012–13 Jack Adams Award winner	
10	Dave Cameron*	2014–2016	137	70	50	17	157	.573	6	2	4	.333		
11	Guy Boucher	2016–2019	228	94	108	26	214	.469	19	11	8	.579		
12	Marc Crawford	2019	18	7	10	1	15	.417	—	—	—	—		
13	D. J. Smith	2019–2023	317	131	154	32	294	.464	—	—	—	—		
—	Jacques Martin	2023–2024	56	26	26	4	56	.500	—	—	—	—		
14	Travis Green	2024–present	164	89	57	18	196	.598	10	2	8	.200		

== Notes ==
- ^{a} A running total of the number of coaches of the Senators. Thus, any coach who has two or more separate terms as head coach is only counted once.
- ^{b} Before the 2005–06 season, the NHL instituted a shootout for regular season games that remained tied after a five-minute overtime period, which prevented ties.
- ^{c} Each year is linked to an article about that particular NHL season.
- ^{d} Was made the head coach for the last two games of the 2001–02 season so he could become the ninth head coach in NHL history to coach 1,000 games, which he achieved.
