= Travis Green =

Canadian ice hockey player and coach (born 1970)

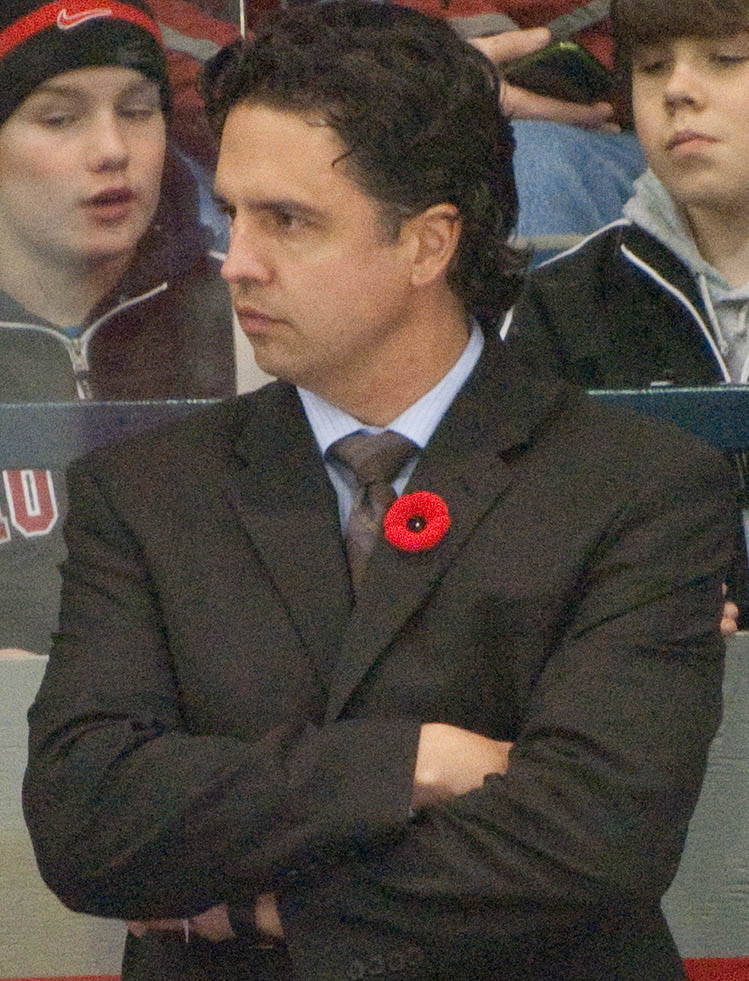
- Green in 2010
- Born: December 20, 1970 (age 55) Creston, British Columbia, Canada
- Height: 6 ft 2 in (188 cm)
- Weight: 200 lb (91 kg; 14 st 4 lb)
- Position: Centre
- Shot: Right
- Played for: New York Islanders; Anaheim Ducks; Phoenix Coyotes; Toronto Maple Leafs; Boston Bruins; EV Zug
- Current NHL coach: Ottawa Senators
- Coached for: Vancouver Canucks; New Jersey Devils
- National team: Canada
- NHL draft: 23rd overall, 1989; New York Islanders
- Playing career: 1990–2008
- Coaching career: 2008–present

Travis Vernon Green (born December 20, 1970) is a Canadian professional ice hockey coach and former player who is the head coach for the Ottawa Senators of the National Hockey League (NHL). Green formerly served as head coach for the Vancouver Canucks and New Jersey Devils of the NHL, as well as the American Hockey League's Utica Comets, Vancouver's former minor league affiliate. Drafted 23rd overall in 1989, Green played for five different NHL teams in his 14-year career.

== Playing career ==
Green started with the Spokane Chiefs in the Western Hockey League (WHL), playing with them from 1986 to 1989. In the middle of the 1989–90 season, he was traded to the Medicine Hat Tigers, where he completed his junior career. While with the Chiefs, he scored 137 goals and 165 assists for a total of 302 points. He added 15 goals, 24 assists, and 39 points with the Tigers.

Green was drafted 23rd overall by the New York Islanders in the 1989 NHL entry draft. Green played 857 career games, scoring 182 goals and 249 assists for 431 points. His best season statistically was the 1995–96 season, when he scored 25 goals and 45 assists for 70 points in only 69 games. On June 30, 2006, the final year of his contract with the Boston Bruins was bought out. On August 10, 2006, he was signed by the Anaheim Ducks, the team he had previously played for from 1998 to 1999. However, he played only seven games in his return to the Ducks, before being claimed on waivers by another former team, the Toronto Maple Leafs, in January 2007.

Green was a member of Team Canada at the 2007 Spengler Cup.

== Coaching career ==
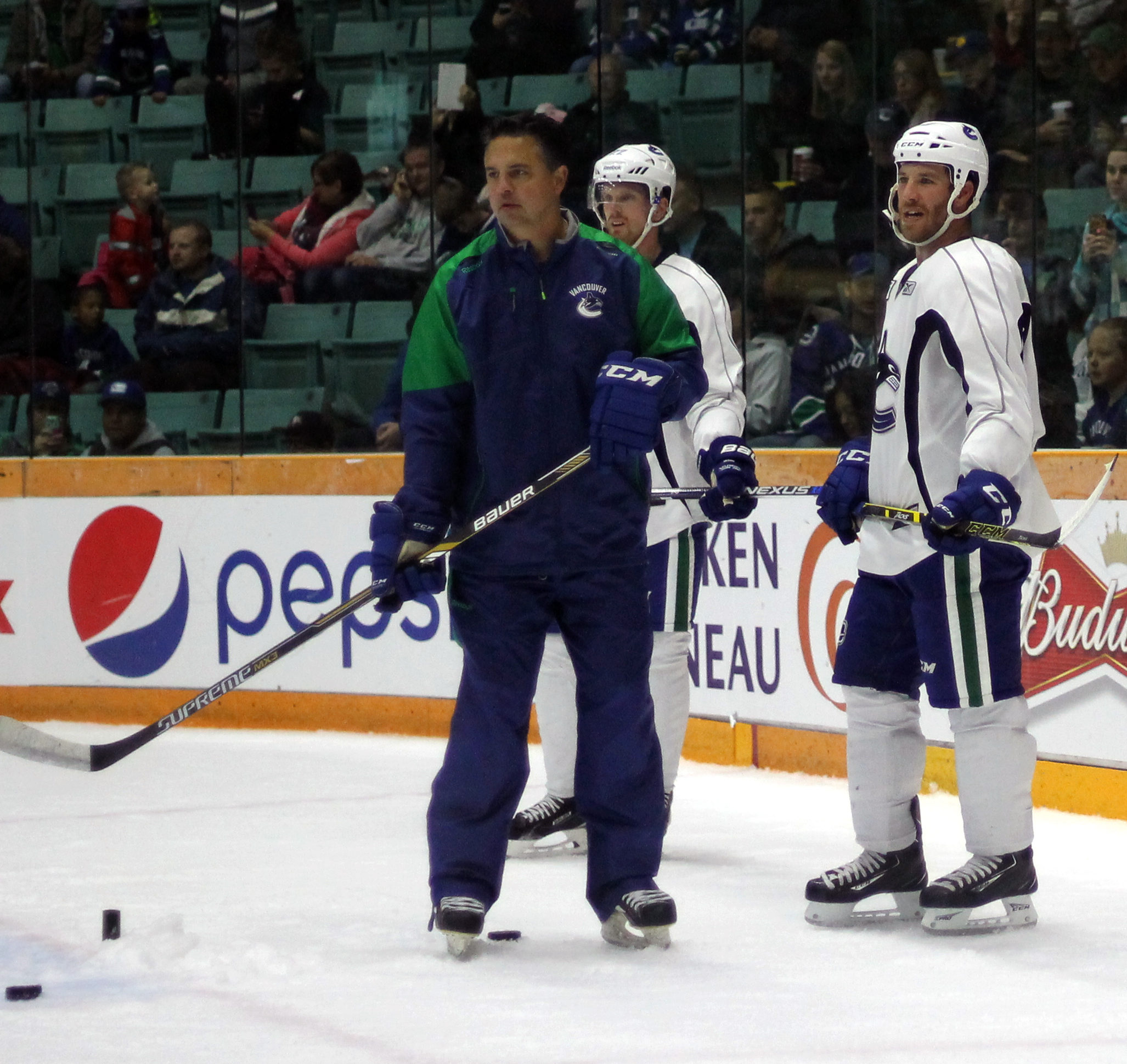
Green at Vancouver Canucks training camp in 2015.

After finishing his playing career, Green was hired by the Portland Winterhawks as an assistant coach and assistant general manager in 2008. Midway through the 2012–13 season, head coach and general manager Mike Johnston was suspended by the WHL for player-benefit violations. Green took over as interim head coach, finishing with a 37–8–0–2 record in the final 47 games. In the playoffs, Portland advanced to the final, where they defeated the Edmonton Oil Kings in six games to win the Ed Chynoweth Cup as WHL champions and secure a berth in the Memorial Cup tournament. In the tournament, Portland lost in the final to the Halifax Mooseheads.

In the 2013 off-season, Green was hired as the head coach of the American Hockey League's (AHL) Utica Comets, the top minor league affiliate of the National Hockey League's (NHL) Vancouver Canucks. In the 2014–15 season, he led them to the Calder Cup finals where they lost in five games to the Manchester Monarchs. On April 26, 2017, he was named head coach of the Vancouver Canucks. On December 5, 2021, Green was fired as the head coach of the Canucks along with general manager Jim Benning after leading the team to an 8–15–2 record.

In December 2022, Green coached Canada at the 2022 Spengler Cup. This appearance marked Green's international coaching debut.

On June 22, 2023, the New Jersey Devils hired Green as associate coach in head coach Lindy Ruff's staff. He was named the team's interim head coach after Ruff was fired on March 4, 2024.

On May 7, 2024, Green was named head coach of the Ottawa Senators. On April 8, 2025, with four games left in the 2024–25 regular season, Green and the Senators clinched their first playoff berth in eight years. Despite losing 5–2 to the Columbus Blue Jackets, they clinched due to the Montreal Canadiens defeating the Detroit Red Wings. On October 19, 2026, Green signed a multi-year contract to extend his tenure with the Senators through the 2030–31 season.

== Personal life ==
Green was born in Creston, British Columbia. The family moved to Castlegar, British Columbia when Travis was one year old. He lived there until he moved away to play junior hockey. He still considers it home and returns there in summers.

Green and his wife have one daughter and two sons. One of his sons was diagnosed with autism when he was two years old.

Green has the vision deficiency where he cannot differentiate red from green.

== Career statistics ==
=== Regular season and playoffs ===
			Regular season					Playoffs
Season	Team	League	GP	G	A	Pts	PIM	GP	G	A	Pts	PIM
1986–87	Spokane Chiefs	WHL	64	8	17	25	27	3	0	0	0	0
1987–88	Spokane Chiefs	WHL	72	33	53	86	42	15	10	10	20	13
1988–89	Spokane Chiefs	WHL	72	51	51	102	79	—	—	—	—	—
1989–90	Spokane Chiefs	WHL	50	45	44	89	90	—	—	—	—	—
1989–90	Medicine Hat Tigers	WHL	25	15	24	39	19	3	0	0	0	2
1990–91	Capital District Islanders	AHL	73	21	34	55	26	—	—	—	—	—
1991–92	Capital District Islanders	AHL	71	23	27	50	10	7	0	4	4	21
1992–93	Capital District Islanders	AHL	20	12	11	23	39	—	—	—	—	—
1992–93	New York Islanders	NHL	61	7	18	25	43	12	3	1	4	6
1993–94	New York Islanders	NHL	83	18	22	40	44	4	0	0	0	2
1994–95	New York Islanders	NHL	42	5	7	12	25	—	—	—	—	—
1995–96	New York Islanders	NHL	69	25	45	70	42	—	—	—	—	—
1996–97	New York Islanders	NHL	79	23	41	64	38	—	—	—	—	—
1997–98	New York Islanders	NHL	54	14	12	26	66	—	—	—	—	—
1997–98	Mighty Ducks of Anaheim	NHL	22	5	11	16	16	—	—	—	—	—
1998–99	Mighty Ducks of Anaheim	NHL	79	13	17	30	81	4	0	1	1	4
1999–00	Phoenix Coyotes	NHL	78	25	21	46	45	5	1	2	3	2
2000–01	Phoenix Coyotes	NHL	69	13	15	28	63	—	—	—	—	—
2001–02	Toronto Maple Leafs	NHL	82	11	23	34	61	20	3	6	9	34
2002–03	Toronto Maple Leafs	NHL	75	12	12	24	67	4	2	1	3	4
2003–04	Boston Bruins	NHL	64	11	5	16	67	7	0	1	1	8
2005–06	Boston Bruins	NHL	82	10	12	22	79	—	—	—	—	—
2006–07	Anaheim Ducks	NHL	7	1	1	2	6	—	—	—	—	—
2006–07	Toronto Maple Leafs	NHL	24	0	0	0	21	—	—	—	—	—
2007–08	EV Zug	NLA	29	9	11	20	126	6	0	3	3	12
NHL totals			970	193	262	455	764	56	10	11	21	60

=== International ===
Medal record

Men's ice hockey

Representing Canada

World Championships
Gold medal – first place	1997 Helsinki	
Silver medal – second place	1996 Vienna	

Spengler Cup
Gold medal – first place	2007 Davos	

Year	Team	Event	Result	GP	G	A	Pts	PIM
1996	Canada	WC	2nd place, silver medalist(s)	8	5	3	8	8
1997	Canada	WC	1st place, gold medalist(s)	11	3	6	9	12
1998	Canada	WC	6th	6	0	3	3	2
Senior totals				25	8	12	20	22

== Head coaching record ==
=== NHL ===
Team	Year	Regular season						Postseason			
Team	Year	G	W	L	OTL	Pts	Finish	W	L	Win %	Result
VAN	2017–18	82	31	40	11	73	7th in Pacific	—	—	—	Missed playoffs
VAN	2018–19	82	35	36	11	81	5th in Pacific	—	—	—	Missed playoffs
VAN	2019–20	69	36	27	6	78	3rd in Pacific	10	7	.588	Lost in second round (VGK)
VAN	2020–21	56	23	29	4	50	7th in North	—	—	—	Missed playoffs
VAN	2021–22	25	8	15	2	(18)	(fired)	—	—	—	—
VAN total		314	133	147	34			10	7	.588	1 playoff appearance
NJD	2023–24	21	8	12	1	(17)	7th in Metropolitan	—	—	—	Missed playoffs
NJD total		21	8	12	1			—	—	—	
OTT	2024–25	82	45	30	7	97	4th in Atlantic	2	4	.333	Lost in first round (TOR)
OTT	2025–26	82	44	27	11	99	5th in Atlantic	0	4	.000	Lost in first round (CAR)
OTT total		164	89	57	18			2	8	.200	2 playoff appearances
Total		499	230	216	53			12	15	.444	3 playoff appearances

=== Other leagues ===
Team	Year	Regular season						Postseason			
Team	Year	G	W	L	OTL	Pts	Finish	W	L	Win %	Result
POR	2012–13	47	37	8	2	117	1st in West	16	5	.762	Won Championship; Lost Memorial Cup
WHL total		47	37	8	2			16	5	.762	1 playoff appearance
UTI	2013–14	76	35	32	9	79	3rd in North	—	—	—	Missed playoffs
UTI	2014–15	76	47	20	7	103	1st in North	12	11	.522	Lost in Calder Cup Final
UTI	2015–16	76	38	26	8	88	3rd in North	1	3	.250	Lost in division semifinals
UTI	2016–17	76	35	32	9	79	5th in North	—	—	—	Missed playoffs
AHL total		304	155	110	33			13	14	.481	2 playoff appearances

Sporting positions
Preceded by Willie Desjardins	Head coach of the Vancouver Canucks; 2017–2021	Succeeded by Bruce Boudreau
Preceded by Lindy Ruff	Head coach of the New Jersey Devils (interim); 2024	Succeeded by Sheldon Keefe
Preceded by Jacques Martin (interim)	Head coach of the Ottawa Senators; 2024–present	Incumbent
