= Dub Mission =

Dub and reggae party in San Francisco

- Genre: Dub, Reggae, Electronic
- Locations: San Francisco, California, USA
- Years active: 1996 - Present
- Founder: DJ Sep
- Website: https://djsep.com

DJ Sep spinning at Dub Mission.

Dub Mission is a dub, dubstep, roots, and dancehall party which occurs weekly on Sunday nights at San Francisco's Elbo Room club in the Mission district. Started by DJ Sep in 1996 as a monthly venue to fill a void in the Bay Area's dub scene, Dub Mission has grown into a weekly event with a loyal fan base, and regularly features prominent dub and reggae musicians as guests. Resident DJs of Dub Mission include J Boogie, Ludichris, Vinnie Esparza, and Maneesh the Twister. Prominent stars who have performed at Dub Mission events include the Mad Professor, Adrian Sherwood, DJ Collage, Mungo's Hi Fi, Scientist, Tippa Irie, Twilight Circus Dub Sound System, and Tino Corp.

Dub Mission has won awards including a 1999 Goldie Award and a 2004 award for Best Dub Club.
