= D. J. Smith (ice hockey) =

Canadian ice hockey coach and player

- Born: May 13, 1977 (age 49) Windsor, Ontario, Canada
- Height: 6 ft 2 in (188 cm)
- Weight: 205 lb (93 kg; 14 st 9 lb)
- Position: Defence
- Shot: Left
- Played for: Toronto Maple Leafs; Colorado Avalanche
- Coached for: Ottawa Senators; Los Angeles Kings
- NHL draft: 41st overall, 1995; New York Islanders
- Playing career: 1997–2004
- Coaching career: 2005–present

Denis Joseph Smith (born May 13, 1977) is a Canadian professional ice hockey coach and former player who is an associate coach for the Edmonton Oilers in the National Hockey League (NHL). He previously served as head coach of the Ottawa Senators for five seasons from 2019 to 2023 as well as interim head coach for the Los Angeles Kings in 2026. As a player, Smith played 45 NHL games with both the Toronto Maple Leafs and Colorado Avalanche. As a coach, Smith won the Memorial Cup in 2015 and spent four years as an assistant with the Maple Leafs before joining Ottawa.

== Playing career ==
=== Junior hockey ===
As a youth, Smith played in the 1991 Quebec International Pee-Wee Hockey Tournament with a minor ice hockey team from Windsor, Ontario.

==== Windsor Spitfires (1994–1997) ====
Smith was drafted by the Windsor Spitfires of the Ontario Hockey League (OHL) in the second round, 20th overall, in the 1994 OHL Draft Priority. Smith appeared in 61 games with the Spitfires during his rookie season in 1994–95, scoring four goals and 17 points, while accumulating 201 penalty minutes, the second most on the club. In 10 playoff games, Smith scored a goal and four points, as the Spitfires defeated the Sarnia Sting in the first round of the playoffs, before falling to the Sudbury Wolves in the OHL quarter-finals.

Smith saw a big increase in his offensive production during his second season with the Spitfires in 1995–96. In 64 games, Smith scored 14 goals and 59 points, tying him for fourth in team scoring. Smith led the team with 260 penalty minutes. In seven playoff games, Smith scored one goal and eight points, as the Spitfires lost to the Detroit Whalers in the first round of the post-season.

The Spitfires named Smith the captain of the team for the 1996–97. In 63 games, Smith led the defence in scoring, as he had 15 goals and 67 points, as he finished fifth in overall team scoring. In the post-season, Smith scored a goal and eight points in five games, as Windsor lost to the Sarnia Sting in the first round of the OHL playoffs.

=== Professional career ===
==== New York Islanders (1995–1996) ====
Smith was drafted by the New York Islanders of the National Hockey League in the second round, 41st overall, at the 1995 NHL entry draft. Smith's stay with the Islanders did not last long, as on March 15, 1996, Smith was traded to the Toronto Maple Leafs in a trade that included Wendel Clark and Mathieu Schneider going to Toronto, while the Islanders received Darby Hendrickson, Sean Haggerty, Kenny Jonsson, and Toronto's first-round draft pick in the 1997 NHL entry draft, in which the Islanders would select Roberto Luongo.

==== Toronto Maple Leafs (1996–2002) ====
Smith appeared in one game with the St. John's Maple Leafs, Toronto's American Hockey League affiliate, following the conclusion to Smith's junior hockey season with the Windsor Spitfires. Smith had no points in his lone appearance during the 1995–96 season.

Smith joined the Toronto Maple Leafs after his junior season in Windsor in 1996–97. On March 26, 1997, Smith played in his first NHL game, earning an assist on a goal scored by Brandon Convery, as the Maple Leafs defeated the San Jose Sharks 2–1. On March 29, Smith had his first career NHL fight, against Rene Corbet of the Colorado Avalanche. Overall, in eight games with Toronto, Smith had one assist and seven penalty minutes. Following the Leafs season, Smith was assigned to the St. John's Maple Leafs, wherein in one post-season game, he had no points.

Smith was assigned to St. John's for the 1997–98 season. In 65 games with St. John's, Smith scored four goals and 15 points, while earning 237 penalty minutes, ranking him third on the team. In four post-season games, Smith had no points, as the Maple Leafs lost to the Saint John Flames in the Atlantic Division semi-finals.

In 1998–99, Smith saw his offensive production increase in St. John's, as he scored seven goals and 35 points in 79 games, as he was the highest-scoring defenceman on the team. Smith's 216 penalty minutes ranked second on the club. In the post-season, Smith earned an assist in five games, as St. John's lost to the Fredericton Canadiens in the Atlantic Division semi-finals.

Smith returned to St. John's for the 1999–2000 season, as in 74 games, he scored six goals and 28 points while ranking second on the team with 197 penalty minutes. As St. John's failed to qualify for the post-season, Smith earned a promotion to Toronto late in the 1999–2000 NHL season. In three games with Toronto, Smith had no points in three games.

Smith spent the entire 2000–01 season with St. John's. Injuries limited Smith to 59 games, where he scored seven goals and 19 points. In the post-season, Smith had no points in four games, as St. John's lost to the Quebec Citadelles in the Canadian Division semi-finals.

In 2001–02, Smith began the season with St. John's. In 59 games with the Maple Leafs in the AHL, Smith scored six goals and 16 points.

On March 1, 2002, Smith was traded to the Colorado Avalanche in a three-way trade that saw Marc Moro traded to the Toronto Maple Leafs, and a ninth-round draft pick acquired by the Nashville Predators.

==== Colorado Avalanche (2002–2004) ====
Smith joined the Hershey Bears, the American Hockey League (AHL) affiliate of the Colorado Avalanche, for the rest of the 2001–02, following his trade by the Toronto Maple Leafs. In 14 games with the Bears, Smith earned three assists. In the post-season, Smith appeared in eight games, scoring one goal, his first career AHL playoff goal, as the Bears defeated the Norfolk Admirals in the Western Conference quarter-finals, before losing to the Houston Aeros in the Western Conference semi-finals.

Smith spent the majority of the 2002–03 season with the Colorado Avalanche. On October 17, 2002, Smith played in his first game with the Avalanche, as he had no points, and a fight with Ian Laperrière, in a 4–1 win over the Los Angeles Kings. On January 23, 2003, Smith scored his first career NHL goal, as he scored against Marc Denis of the Columbus Blue Jackets in a 5–0 victory. This point was Smith's first in the NHL since March 26, 1997. Overall, in 34 games with Colorado, Smith scored one goal and accumulated 55 penalty minutes. In the AHL, Smith played in two games with the Hershey Bears, earning no points.

Smith was re-assigned to the Hershey Bears for the 2003–04 season. In 35 games with Hershey, Smith scored seven goals and 14 points. On January 14, 2004, Smith suffered a knee injury in a game against the Norfolk Admirals, causing Smith to miss the remainder of the season. Smith announced his retirement as a player on June 14, 2005.

== Coaching career ==
=== Windsor Spitfires (2005–2012) ===
Smith joined the Windsor Spitfires as an assistant coach, working under newly hired head coach Moe Mantha. In 2005–06, the Spitfires finished the season with a 32–26–7 record, earning 71 points and seventh place in the Western Conference. In the post-season, Windsor lost in the Western Conference quarter-finals to the Plymouth Whalers.

In 2006–07, the Spitfires replaced Mantha with Bob Boughner as the new head coach, as Smith remained with the club as an assistant. The rebuilding Spitfires struggled to a record of 18–43–7, earning 43 points and ninth place in the Western Conference, as the club failed to reach the post-season.

The Spitfires rebounded in 2007–08 season, as the club finished with a 41–15–12 record, earning 94 points, which represented a 51-point improvement from the previous season, as the club finished in third place in the Western Conference. In the playoffs, Windsor was upset by the Sarnia Sting in the Western Conference quarter-finals.

Windsor continued to improve during the 2008–09 season, as the Spitfires finished with a 57–10–1 record, earning 115 points and winning the Hamilton Spectator Trophy as the top regular season team in the OHL. In the post-season, the Spitfires swept the Owen Sound Attack in the Western Conference quarter-finals. In the Western Conference semi-finals, Windsor defeated the Plymouth Whalers in six games. In the Western Conference finals against the second place London Knights, Windsor easily defeated them in five games, advancing to the OHL finals. In the final round, the Spitfires defeated the Brampton Battalion in five games, winning the J. Ross Robertson Cup and advancing to the 2009 Memorial Cup. At the Memorial Cup, Windsor defeated the Kelowna Rockets in the final game to win the Memorial Cup.

The Spitfires remained a top club in the OHL during the 2009–10, as the club earned a record of 50–12–6, earning 106 points, and first place in the Western Conference. In the post-season, Windsor swept the Erie Otters in the Western Conference quarter-finals, followed by a second consecutive sweep in the Western Conference semi-finals, as Windsor defeated the Plymouth Whalers. In the Western Conference finals, the Spitfires lost their first three games to the Kitchener Rangers before winning four in a row to win the series and advance to the J. Ross Robertson Cup for the second consecutive season. In the OHL finals, Windsor swept the top-ranked Barrie Colts in four games to win the OHL Championship and advance to the 2010 Memorial Cup. At the tournament, Windsor put up a perfect record of 4–0, including a 9–1 win over the Brandon Wheat Kings in the final game, to clinch their second consecutive Memorial Cup championship.

In 2010–11, Smith was promoted to become an associate coach of the Spitfires, as head coach Bob Boughner left the club and Bob Jones took over head coaching duties. Windsor remained a good team during the season, earning a solid 39–23–6 record, earning 84 points, and fourth place in the Western Conference. In the post-season, the Spitfires defeated the Erie Otters in seven games in the Western Conference quarter-finals. In the Western Conference semi-finals, the Spitfires upset the Saginaw Spirit, as the club reached the Western Conference finals for the third consecutive season. In the conference finals against the Owen Sound Attack, the Spitfires lost in five games.

Bob Boughner returned to the Spitfires in 2011–12 as head coach, as Smith remained with the club as an assistant. Windsor began to rebuild during this season, as the club struggled to a 29–32–7 record, earning 65 points, and eighth place in the Western Conference. In the post-season, the Spitfires were swept by the London Knights in four games in the Western Conference quarter-finals.

Following the 2011–12 season, Smith resigned from his position with the Spitfires, as he was hired to become the head coach of the Oshawa Generals.

=== Oshawa Generals (2012–2015) ===
Smith joined the Oshawa Generals of the Ontario Hockey League as head coach for the 2012–13 season. On September 20, 2012, Smith coached his first career OHL game, earning the victory as the Generals defeated the Peterborough Petes 5–2. Oshawa had a very strong season, earning a record of 42–22–4, getting 88 points, and finishing in third place in the Eastern Conference. In the post-season, the Generals defeated the Niagara IceDogs in five games in the Eastern Conference quarter-finals, however, the club was swept by the Barrie Colts in the Eastern Conference semi-finals.

Oshawa improved slightly in the 2013–14 season, as the club finished the season with a 42–20–6 record, earning 90 points and first place in the Eastern Conference. In the post-season, the Generals swept the Mississauga Steelheads in the Eastern Conference quarter-finals, followed by a second straight sweep in the Eastern Conference semi-finals, as Oshawa defeated the Peterborough Petes in four games. In the Eastern Conference finals, the Generals were swept by the North Bay Battalion. Smith won the Matt Leyden Trophy as the OHL Coach of the Year in the 2013–14 OHL season.

The Generals were the top team in the Eastern Conference in 2014–15, as the club earned a 51–11–6 record, earning 108 points, which was an improvement of 18 points over the previous season. In the post-season, the Generals defeated the Peterborough Petes in five games in the Eastern Conference quarter-finals, followed by defeating the Niagara IceDogs in five games in the Eastern Conference semi-finals. In the Eastern Conference finals, the Generals had a re-match against the North Bay Battalion, as Oshawa got their revenge, as they defeated the Battalion in six games. In the J. Ross Robertson Cup finals against the Erie Otters, led by Connor McDavid, the Generals won the series in five games to clinch the OHL championship and a berth into the 2015 Memorial Cup. At the tournament, the Generals finished with a perfect record and defeated the Kelowna Rockets 2–1 in overtime in the final game to win the Memorial Cup.

Following the 2014–15 season, Smith resigned as head coach of the Generals, as he took a job to become an assistant coach with the Toronto Maple Leafs.

=== Toronto Maple Leafs (2015–2019) ===
Smith joined the Toronto Maple Leafs of the National Hockey League as an assistant coach to newly hired head coach Mike Babcock. In his first season with the Leafs in 2015–16, Toronto struggled to a 29–42–11 record, earning 69 points, and finishing in last place in the NHL.

The rebuilding Leafs saw improvement during the 2016–17 season, as Toronto finished with a 40–27–15 record, earning 95 points, and the second wild-card seed in the Eastern Conference. In the post-season, the Maple Leafs lost to the Washington Capitals in six games.

Toronto continued to improve during Smith's third season with the team in 2017–18, as the Maple Leafs had a 49–26–7 record, earning 105 points, and third place in the Atlantic Division. In the first round of the post-season, the Leafs lost to the Boston Bruins in seven games.

The Leafs saw a slight decline in the 2018–19 season, as the club finished with a 46–28–8 record, earning 100 points, five fewer than the previous season, however, Toronto once again finished in third place in the Atlantic Division. In the first round of the playoffs, the Leafs had a re-match against the Boston Bruins and once again lost in seven games to the Bruins.

Following the season, Smith resigned from his job with the Leafs and took the job to become the head coach of the Ottawa Senators.

=== Ottawa Senators (2019–2023) ===
On May 23, 2019, the Ottawa Senators announced that Smith agreed to a three-year contract to be the team's head coach. On July 28, 2021, the Senators signed Smith to a two-year contract extension, running through the 2023–24 season, with a club option for 2024–25. After an 11–15–0 start to his fifth season as head coach, the Senators fired Smith on December 18, 2023.

=== Los Angeles Kings (2024–2026) ===
On February 6, 2024, the Los Angeles Kings hired Smith as an assistant coach on Jim Hiller's staff. On March 1, 2026, Hiller was fired, with Smith being named interim head coach of the Kings. Smith finished the season 11–6–6, with the Kings qualifying for the 2026 Stanley Cup playoffs as a wild card; they were subsequently swept by the Colorado Avalanche. Following the season, Smith was replaced as head coach by Peter Laviolette. He joined the Edmonton Oilers' coaching staff as Associated Coach on June 23, 2026. He is joining Mike Babcock who was hired on the same day as the Oilers' head coach for the coming season.

== Career statistics ==
			Regular season					Playoffs
Season	Team	League	GP	G	A	Pts	PIM	GP	G	A	Pts	PIM
1994–95	Windsor Spitfires	OHL	61	4	13	17	201	10	1	3	4	41
1995–96	Windsor Spitfires	OHL	64	14	45	59	260	7	1	7	8	23
1995–96	St. John's Maple Leafs	AHL	1	0	0	0	0	—	—	—	—	—
1996–97	Windsor Spitfires	OHL	63	15	52	67	190	5	1	7	8	11
1996–97	Toronto Maple Leafs	NHL	8	0	1	1	7	—	—	—	—	—
1996–97	St. John's Maple Leafs	AHL	—	—	—	—	—	1	0	0	0	0
1997–98	St. John's Maple Leafs	AHL	65	4	11	15	237	4	0	0	0	4
1998–99	St. John's Maple Leafs	AHL	79	7	28	35	216	5	0	1	1	0
1999–00	St. John's Maple Leafs	AHL	74	6	22	28	197	—	—	—	—	—
1999–00	Toronto Maple Leafs	NHL	3	0	0	0	5	—	—	—	—	—
2000–01	St. John's Maple Leafs	AHL	59	7	12	19	106	4	0	0	0	11
2001–02	St. John's Maple Leafs	AHL	59	6	10	16	152	—	—	—	—	—
2001–02	Hershey Bears	AHL	14	0	3	3	33	8	1	0	1	33
2002–03	Hershey Bears	AHL	2	0	0	0	4	—	—	—	—	—
2002–03	Colorado Avalanche	NHL	34	1	0	1	55	—	—	—	—	—
2003–04	Hershey Bears	AHL	35	7	7	14	71	—	—	—	—	—
NHL totals			45	1	1	2	67	—	—	—	—	—

== Head coaching record ==
=== NHL ===
Team	Year	Regular season						Postseason			
Team	Year	G	W	L	OTL	Pts	Finish	W	L	Win%	Result
OTT	2019–20	71	25	34	12	62	7th in Atlantic	—	—	—	Missed playoffs
OTT	2020–21	56	23	28	5	51	6th in North	—	—	—	Missed playoffs
OTT	2021–22	82	33	42	7	73	7th in Atlantic	—	—	—	Missed playoffs
OTT	2022–23	82	39	35	8	86	6th in Atlantic	—	—	—	Missed playoffs
OTT	2023–24	26	11	15	0	(22)	(fired)	—	—	—	—
OTT total		317	131	154	32						
LAK	2025–26	23	11	6	6	(28)	4th in Pacific	0	4	.000	Lost in first round (COL)
LAK total		23	11	6	6			0	4	.000	1 playoff appearance
Total		340	142	160	38			0	4	.000	1 playoff appearance

=== OHL ===
Team	Year	Regular season						Postseason
Team	Year	G	W	L	OTL	Pts	Finish	Result
OSH	2012–13	68	42	22	4	88	2nd in East	Lost in Second Round
OSH	2013–14	68	42	20	6	90	1st in East	Lost in Third Round
OSH	2014–15	68	51	11	6	108	1st in East	Won Memorial Cup
Total		204	135	53	16	286		

Sporting positions
Preceded by Marc Crawford (interim)	Head coach of the Ottawa Senators; 2019–2023	Succeeded by Jacques Martin (interim)
Preceded by Jim Hiller	Head coach of the Los Angeles Kings (interim); 2026	Succeeded by Peter Laviolette
