= Pulselocker =

DJ music streaming service

- Company type: Private
- Industry: Music streaming
- Founded: 2011
- Founders: Joshua Goltz, Alvaro Velilla, Ryan Walsh
- Fate: Acquired
- Successor: Beatport LINK
- Headquarters: San Francisco, California, United States
- Products: DJ streaming service
- Services: Music streaming platform for DJs

Pulselocker was a subscription-based music streaming platform designed for professional DJs. Launched in 2012, the service enabled DJs to stream licensed music directly within DJ software while also providing offline playback capabilities for live performances.

The platform integrated streaming catalogs with professional DJ software workflows and sought to provide a legal alternative to piracy and large local music libraries used by DJs. Pulselocker partnered with major and independent record labels and integrated with DJ software platforms including Serato DJ, Rekordbox, and VirtualDJ.

In 2018, Pulselocker was acquired by Beatport.

== History ==
Pulselocker was founded in 2011 in San Francisco by Alvaro Velilla, Joshua Goltz, and Ryan Walsh. They developed the platform to address challenges faced by DJs in accessing licensed music catalogs for performance. At the time, most DJs relied on purchased downloads or locally stored files, while consumer streaming services did not permit integration with professional DJ software. It launched publicly in 2013 as a hybrid streaming and download service aimed at DJs. Pulselocker completed a Series A financing round with participation from investors including electronic musician Ben Harris of the group Dirty Vegas. Harris was a member of Dirty Vegas, whose recording "Days Go By" won a Grammy Award for Best Dance Recording.

Pulselocker integration was introduced in beta versions of Serato DJ in 2016, allowing DJs to stream tracks directly within the software. It also announced a partnership with Pioneer DJ in 2016 to integrate with the Rekordbox ecosystem and compatible DJ hardware.

In 2018 Beatport acquired Pulselocker in a private transaction for an undisclosed amount. Beatport subsequently launched Beatport LINK, a streaming service integrated with DJ software.

In 2013, coverage in DJ TechTools described a relaunch of the web app and revised subscription tiers for its locker-based model.

== Platform and features ==
Pulselocker provided several features designed specifically for DJs. Pulselocker combined cloud-based streaming infrastructure with locally stored encrypted audio files accessible through integrated DJ software. This architecture allowed DJs to stream music from a licensed catalog while maintaining offline access to selected tracks for performance environments where internet connectivity was unreliable. The system for managing streamed tracks with offline access was later described in a U.S. patent related to secure content access systems for digital media locker services.

Pulselocker integrated with several professional DJ software platforms, allowing users to browse, stream, and load tracks directly within their performance software. These integrations were enabled through software development kits (SDKs) and application programming interfaces (APIs) provided by Pulselocker.

Pulselocker launched before later DJ-focused streaming services such as Beatport LINK and DJ integrations using SoundCloud Go+ and Tidal. Its model of integrating streaming catalogs directly with DJ software influenced later streaming workflows adopted across DJ platforms.

=== Offline locker ===
A core feature of Pulselocker was its Locker, which allowed users to store encrypted audio files locally for offline playback during performances. Tracks stored in the Locker remained accessible within supported DJ software even without an internet connection.

The intellectual property for managing streamed tracks with offline access was granted in 2017 for a U.S. patent related to a secure content access system.

=== Music discovery ===
The platform also included discovery tools that allowed DJs to follow record labels and receive notifications when new releases became available.

== Licensing and catalog ==
Pulselocker secured licensing agreements with major record labels including Universal Music Group, Sony Music Entertainment, and Warner Music Group, allowing DJs to stream music from major-label catalogs through the platform. The service also worked with independent labels and distributors through partnerships with organizations such as Merlin Network and The Orchard. These agreements enabled Pulselocker to offer a catalog spanning millions of tracks across electronic music and other genres.
