= Mike Johnston (ice hockey) =

Canadian ice hockey coach (born 1957)

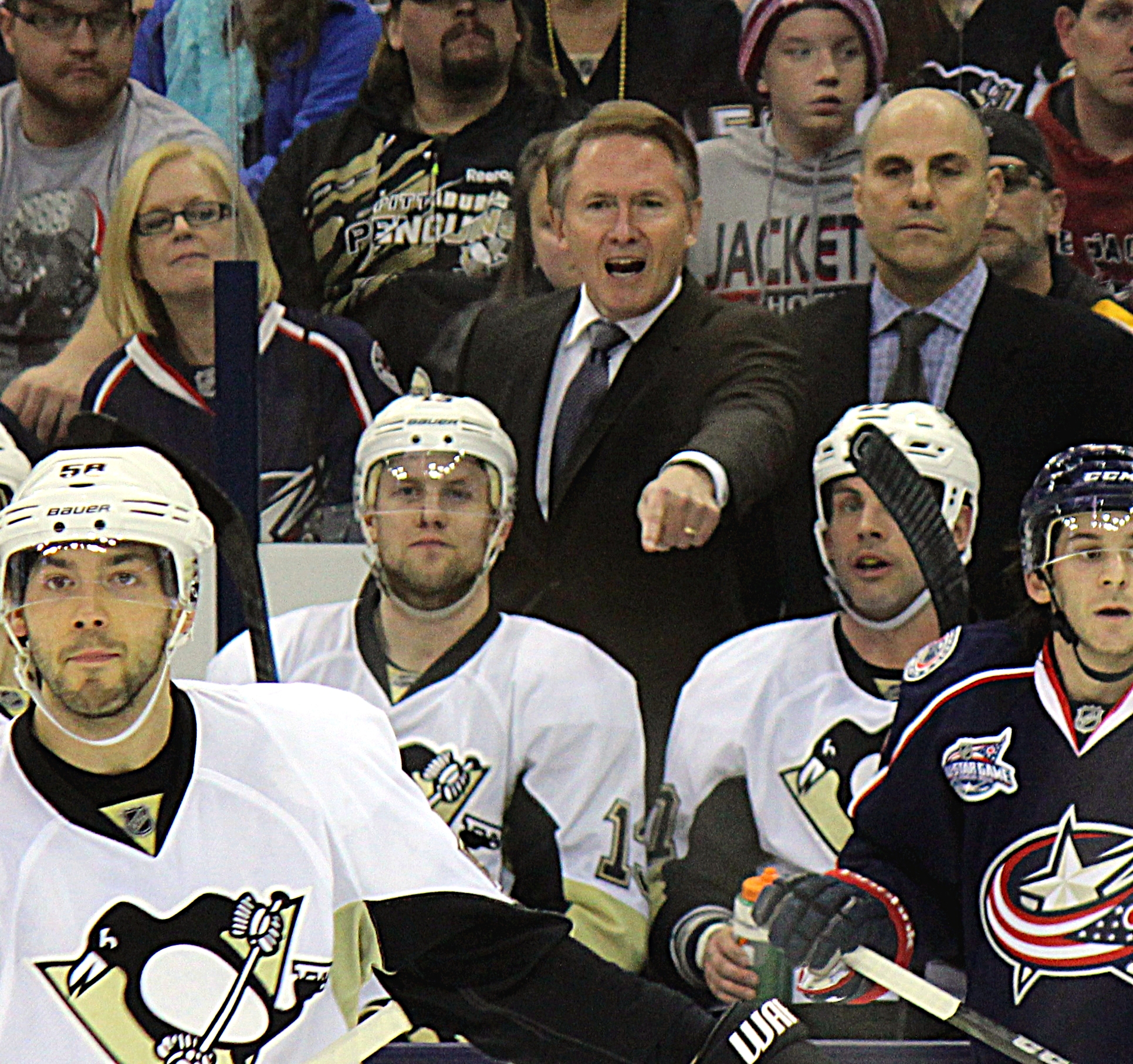
- Born: February 19, 1957 (age 69) Dartmouth, Nova Scotia, Canada
- Coached for: Pittsburgh Penguins(Head); Vancouver Canucks(Assistant); Los Angeles Kings(Associate); UNB Varsity Reds(Head); Calgary Dinos(Assistant); Augustana University College(Head); Portland Winterhawks(Head)
- Coaching career: 1982–2024

Mike Johnston (born February 19, 1957) is a Canadian ice hockey coach who currently serves as vice president and general manager of the Portland Winterhawks of the Western Hockey League. Johnston guided the Winterhawks to 5 WHL Finals appearances, including a championship in 2013.

After six historic seasons in Portland, Johnston was hired as the head coach of the Pittsburgh Penguins of the National Hockey League (NHL). He spent one plus season as the bench boss of the Penguins before returning to Portland in an elevated role as Head Coach and General Manager of the hockey club in 2016.

During Johnston's 13 years as the head coach in Portland, he helped 41 Winterhawks get drafted into the NHL, including nine players being selected in the first round. Before his tenure with Portland, he worked for Team Canada and spent nearly a decade as an assistant and associate coach with the Vancouver Canucks (1999–2006) and the Los Angeles Kings (2006–2008).

He also works as a "Hockey Player Development" instructor for the online sports-career training school Sports Management Worldwide.

== Coaching career ==
Johnston initially started coaching at the College and University level in Canada. He coached college hockey in Alberta for five seasons before becoming the head coach of the University of New Brunswick from 1989 – 1994, winning two McAdam Division titles, and finishing with three first-place finishes and an overall record of 77–44–6. He was named the 3M Coach of the Year in 1994 and won the Telegraph Journal Coach of the Year Award in 1993.

Internationally, Johnston worked for Team Canada for five seasons from 1994 to 1999 serving in the capacity of general manager and associate coach and finally head coach for the 1998–1999 season, and was an assistant coach at the 1998 Winter Olympic Games in Nagano, Japan. In addition to the championships at the senior level, Johnston won three gold medals as head coach for Canada at the Spengler Cup Tournament and two World Junior Championships as an assistant coach in 1994 and 1995.

In 1994 he became general manager and associate coach of the Canadian national men's hockey team. In 1998 he became the head coach for one season. He then spent six seasons as, at first, an assistant coach and then as an associate coach with the Vancouver Canucks. During Johnston's time in Vancouver, the Canucks made four straight trips to the postseason and won the Northwest Division in 2003–2004. After that, he was an associate coach of the Los Angeles Kings.

=== Portland Winterhawks (2008–2014) ===
On October 27, 2008, Johnston was named head coach and general manager of the Portland Winterhawks of the WHL where he served in the dual roles from 2008 to 2014. He amassed a record of 231–114–10–10, landing him second on the Winterhawks' all-time wins list.

In his second season with the Hawks in 2009–10, Johnston guided the team to a 48-point improvement from the prior season, a franchise record, and an appearance in the second round of the playoffs. The Winterhawks topped the 100-point barrier in 2010–11 with 103 points, a U.S. Division title and then their first of four straight trips to the WHL championship series.

After 102 points in 2011–12, they advanced to the WHL championship and the first of their three straight WHL Finals series against the Edmonton Oil Kings. In 2012–13 the Winterhawks had their greatest season in team history, with franchise records of 57 wins and 117 points, and a league record 29 road wins, as they won the third WHL championship in franchise history and advanced to the final of the 2013 Memorial Cup. In 2013–14 the Winterhawks set another franchise record under Johnston, with a 21-game winning streak as they amassed 113 points and their fourth consecutive trip to the championship series.

=== Suspension ===
After an investigation by the Canadian Hockey League, Johnston was suspended by the Western Hockey League for the duration of the 2012–13 WHL season, after it was revealed he offered improper player benefits and committed various recruitment violations over a four-year period. Some of the noted improper benefits Johnston offered to Winterhawk players included paying for their families to come to Portland multiple times during the season by subsidizing travel costs to the city, financing private summer training programs and providing cellular telephones to the team captains. As a result of the violations, Johnston was forced to hand over his general manager and head coaching positions to assistant coach Travis Green, who would guide the club to the Ed Chynoweth Cup. As a punishment for violating league rules, the team was forced to forfeit the first five rounds of the 2013 WHL Bantam Draft, along with their first round draft picks until 2017. The investigation into Johnston's conduct came months after the Ontario Hockey League's Windsor Spitfires were fined for improper player benefits and recruitment violations. Johnston's suspension was lifted at the end of the season.

=== Pittsburgh Penguins (2014–2015) ===
Johnston was hired as the head coach of the Pittsburgh Penguins on June 25, 2014. During the 2014–15 season, the Penguins stormed out of the gate to a 22–6–4 record, but as injuries started to mount, Pittsburgh began to struggle and finished the season eighth in the Eastern Conference, nearly breaking their postseason appearance streak at 8 consecutive playoff qualifications. The Penguins would be eliminated in the first-round of the playoffs by the New York Rangers.

In his second season with Pittsburgh, the Penguins started the 2015–16 season 15–10–3, and Johnston was fired on December 12, 2015. In a team statement announcing the firing, general manager Jim Rutherford stated that he felt the team was "underachieving".

Johnston's combined record with the Penguins was 58–37–15.

=== Portland Winterhawks (2016–2024) ===
Johnston once again returned to the Winterhawks for the 2016–17 season, this time serving as the hockeys clubs head coach, general manager and vice president after having been released by the Pittsburgh Penguins midway through the 2015–16 season. In his first year back with the Winterhawks, Portland amassed 40 wins for the seventh time in eight seasons earning Johnston the Western Conference Coach of the Year award

On October 6, 2023, Johnston secured his 500th WHL win in a 4–1 victory over the Everett Silvertips in Portland making him the 11th coach in WHL history to achieve the milestone. Johnston led the Winterhawks to a 48–15–0 record for the 2023–24 season and advanced to the WHL championship where they were swept by the Moose Jaw Warriors 4–0. Following their 48-win campaign, Johnston was named U.S. Division Executive of the Year and the U.S. Division WHL Coach of the Year, making him a finalist for the Lloyd Saunders Memorial Trophy and the Dunc McCallum Memorial Trophy.

On July 22, 2024, Johnston announced he would be stepping down as head coach to focus on his front office duties as the hockey club's vice president and general manager.

== Personal life ==
Johnston played hockey for Brandon University in Manitoba and Acadia University in Nova Scotia, and holds a master's degree in Coaching Science from Acadia University.

Johnston and his wife Myrna have two children, Gabby and Adam, who serves as a scout for the Portland Winterhawks.

Johnston is the uncle of professional hockey players, Ryan Johnston and Rebecca Johnston.

== Awards and achievements ==
- Spengler Cup Gold Medal – 1993
- IIHF World Junior Championship Gold Medal- 1994, 1995
- IIHF World Championships Bronze Medal – 1995
- IIHF World Championships Silver Medal – 1996
- Spengler Cup Gold Medal – 1993, 1997, 1998
- IIHF World Championships Gold Medal – 1996, 1997, 2007
- IIHF World Championships Silver Medal- 2008
- President's Cup/Ed Chynoweth Cup – 2013

== Books ==
Johnston has authored three books with former NHL player Ryan Walter: Simply the Best: Insights and Strategies from the Great Hockey Coaches, Simply the Best: Players on Performance, and Hockey Plays and Strategies.

== WHL coaching record ==
Team	Year	Regular season						Post season
Team	Year	G	W	L	OTL	Pts	Finish	Result
POR	2008–09	72	19	48	5	43	5th in U.S. Division	Did not qualify
POR	2009–10	72	44	25	3	91	4th in U.S. Division	Lost in round 2
POR	2010–11	72	50	19	3	103	1st in U.S. Division	Lost in finals
POR	2011–12	72	49	19	4	102	2nd in U.S. Division	Lost in finals
POR	2012–13	25	20	4	1	41	(replaced mid-season)	
POR	2013–14	72	54	13	5	113	1st in U.S. Division	Lost in finals
POR	2016–17	72	40	28	4	84	4th in U.S. Division	Lost in round 2
POR	2017–18	72	44	22	6	94	2nd in U.S. Division	Lost in round 2
POR	2018–19	68	40	22	6	86	3rd in U.S. Division	Lost in round 1
POR	2019–20	63	45	11	7	94	1st in U.S. Division	Season cancelled due to COVID-19 pandemic
POR	2020–21	24	13	8	3	29	no standings (Note: The 2020–21 WHL regular season was shortened, started late, then was cancelled early, and no playoffs were held, due to the ongoing COVID-19 pandemic. The Portland Winterhawks were in a mathematical position to finish anywhere from 1st to 3rd in the U.S. Division when the season was cancelled.)	no playoffs
POR	2021–22	68	47	16	5	99	2nd in U.S. Division	Lost in round 2
POR	2022–23	68	40	20	8	88	2nd in U.S. Division	Lost in round 2
POR	2023–24	68	48	15	5	101	1st in U.S. Division	Lost in finals
Total		820	513	252	57	1080		

== NHL coaching record ==
Team	Year	Regular season						Post season
Team	Year	G	W	L	OTL	Pts	Finish	Result
PIT	2014–15	82	43	27	12	98	4th in Metropolitan	Lost in first round (NYR)
PIT	2015–16	28	15	10	3	33	(fired)	—
Total		110	58	37	15	131		

== International coaching record ==
Team	Year	Position	Result
Spengler Cup	1992	Head coach	Gold medal
IIHF World U20 Championship	1994	Assistant coach	Gold medal
IIHF World U20 Championship	1995	Assistant coach	Gold medal
Ice Hockey World Championships	1995	Assistant coach	Bronze medal
Ice Hockey World Championships	1996	Assistant coach	Silver medal
Ice Hockey World Championships	1997	Assistant coach	Gold medal
Spengler Cup	1997	Assistant coach	Gold medal
Spengler Cup	1997	Head coach	Gold medal
Canada at the 1998 Winter Olympics	1998	Assistant coach	4th place
Ice Hockey World Championships	1998	Associate Coach	
Ice Hockey World Championships	1999	Associate Coach	4th place
Ice Hockey World Championships	2007	Associate Coach	Gold medal
Ice Hockey World Championships	2008	Associate Coach	Silver medal
IIHF World U18 Championship	2009	Head coach	4th place

== University head coaching record ==
Team	Year	Regular season			
Team	Year	W	L	OTL	Result
ACAC	1982–83	12	12		3rd place
ACAC	1983–84	15	10		3rd place
ACAC	1984–85	14	11		3rd place
ACAC	1985–86	14	9	2	3rd place
ACAC	1986–87	14	10	1	4th place National Championship
University of New Brunswick	1989–1990	10	8	2	3rd place
University of New Brunswick	1990–91	12	11	3	3rd place
University of New Brunswick	1991–92	18	7	1	1st place Division finalist
University of New Brunswick	1992–93	18	7	1	1st place MacAdam Division Champions AUAA Conference Finalist
University of New Brunswick	1993–94	18	6	2	1st place MacAdam Division Champions AUAA Conference Finalist

== Notes ==
Preceded by Dan Bylsma	Head coach of the Pittsburgh Penguins; 2014–2015	Succeeded by Mike Sullivan
