= Dave Allison =

Canadian ice hockey defenceman (born 1959)

- Born: April 14, 1959 (age 67) Fort Frances, Ontario, Canada
- Height: 6 ft 1 in (185 cm)
- Weight: 200 lb (91 kg; 14 st 4 lb)
- Position: Defence
- Shot: Right
- Played for: Montreal Canadiens
- NHL draft: Undrafted
- Playing career: 1979–1989

David Bryan Allison (born April 14, 1959) is a Canadian former professional ice hockey defenceman and coach. He played three games with the Montreal Canadiens of the National Hockey League (NHL) during the 1983–84 season and was head coach of the Ottawa Senators during the 1995–96 season. He was the head coach of the USHL's Des Moines Buccaneers from 2014 to 2018. In January 2022, he was hired as the head coach of the Fairbanks Ice Dogs in the North American Hockey League.

== Playing career ==
Born in Fort Frances, Ontario, Allison spent his junior hockey career with the Cornwall Royals of the Quebec Major Junior Hockey League (QMJHL), appearing in 189 games from 1976 to 1979, and registering 89 points (18G-71A). He led the league in penalty minutes with 407 during his final season. Allison went undrafted, but was signed as a free agent by the then Stanley Cup champion Montreal Canadiens in 1979.

Allison spent five seasons with the Canadiens' AHL farm team, the Nova Scotia Voyageurs, with his best season coming in 1981–82 when he recorded 8 goals and 25 assists in 78 games, while finishing second in the league with 332 PIM. He eventually appeared in three games with Montreal during the 1983–84 season, recording no points and 12 PIM. The Canadiens moved their AHL club for the 1984–85 season to Sherbrooke, Quebec, and Allison played four games with the Sherbrooke Canadiens before being traded to the Edmonton Oilers, who assigned him to the Nova Scotia Oilers, their AHL team.

Allison played in 68 games in Nova Scotia before spending the following two seasons with the Muskegon Lumberjacks of the International Hockey League (IHL). He contributed 11 points (2G-9A) in 14 playoff games as the Lumberjacks won the 1987 Turner Cup. He served as a player/assistant coach with the Lumberjacks during the 1986–87 season.

During the summer of 1987, Allison was signed by the Toronto Maple Leafs organization and spent the 1987–88 season playing with the Newmarket Saints of the AHL, recording 10 points (1G-9A) in 48 games. He then spent the first part of the 1988–89 season with the Halifax Citadels, the Quebec Nordiques AHL affiliate, playing in 12 games, and registering 3 points (1G-2A), before moving to the Indianapolis Ice of the IHL, serving as an assistant coach with the club for the rest of the season. Following the 1988–89 season, Allison retired as a player.

== Coaching career ==
In 1989–90, Allison was hired by the Virginia Lancers of the ECHL, finishing with a record of 36–18–6, good for third in the league, before losing in the first round of the playoffs. In 1990–91, Allison moved to the Albany Choppers of the International Hockey League (IHL), where the club had a 22–30–3 record before suspending operations. Allison then finished the 1990–91 season coaching the Richmond Renegades of the ECHL, where they finished with a 29–29–6 record and lost in the first round of the playoffs. Allison returned as coach of the Renegades in 1991–92, leading the club to a 30–27–7 record, before falling in the second round of the playoffs.

Allison then moved to the Kingston Frontenacs of the Ontario Hockey League (OHL) for the 1992–93 season, leading the Fronts to a 36–19–11 record and the third round of the playoffs before losing to the Peterborough Petes. He returned to the Frontenacs in 1993–94, posting a 30–28–8 record, but lost to the Belleville Bulls in the first round.

Allison was hired by the Ottawa Senators organization in 1994 as head coach of their top farm team, the Prince Edward Island Senators of the AHL. In 1994–95, he led them to a 41–31–8 record. Allison began the 1995–96 season with PEI, leading them to a 10–11–2 record through 23 games. When the parent team in Ottawa fired head coach Rick Bowness in late 1995, Allison was selected as his replacement. He was fired after 27 games, finishing with a record of 2–22–3, and was replaced by Jacques Martin.

In 1996–97, Allison became coach of the Grand Rapids Griffins and led them to a 40–30–12 record before losing in the first round. In 1997–98 he returned to Grand Rapids and led the team to a 30–25–7 record before being replaced with 20 games left in the season.

Allison's next head coaching job came in 1999–2000 with the Fort Wayne Komets of the United Hockey League (UHL), leading them to a 40–27–7 record and to the third round of the playoffs. He returned to the IHL as coach of the Milwaukee Admirals, the Nashville Predators' IHL affiliate, leading the team to a 42–33–7 record, but losing in the first round of the playoffs. He moved with the club to the American Hockey League (AHL) in 2001–02, but missed the playoffs with a 30–35–10–5 record.

Allison then took a few years away from the professional ranks before taking over the Iowa Stars of the AHL, the Dallas Stars' affiliate, leading them to a 41–31–1–7 record before losing in the first round of the playoffs in his first season with the franchise. In between, he spent time behind the bench of the Fort Frances, Ontario-based Borderland Thunder of the Superior International Junior Hockey League.

Allison was named head coach of the AHL's Peoria Rivermen on June 13, 2012, replacing Jared Bednar as head coach. He was an assistant coach of the AHL's Chicago Wolves for the 2013–14 AHL season.

Allison became the head coach and general manager of the Des Moines Buccaneers in the United States Hockey League in 2014. He was relieved after the team finished last in the Western Conference in the 2017–18 season.

Allison became the fourth head coach in the history of the North American Hockey League's Fairbanks Ice Dogs in January 2022. He compiled a 41–33–7–2 record in 83 regular season games, and 2–3 mark in 5 playoff appearances as the head coach of the Fairbanks Ice Dogs before leaving the team on April 3, 2023, in "an amicable parting."

== Personal ==
David has three daughters Avery, Olivia and Isabella. He is the brother of Susan, Maria and Mike Allison.

== Career statistics ==
=== Regular season and playoffs ===
			Regular season					Playoffs
Season	Team	League	GP	G	A	Pts	PIM	GP	G	A	Pts	PIM
1976–77	Cornwall Royals	QMJHL	63	2	11	13	180	12	0	4	4	60
1977–78	Cornwall Royals	QMJHL	60	9	29	38	314	5	2	3	5	32
1978–79	Cornwall Royals	QMJHL	66	7	31	38	423	7	1	6	7	34
1979–80	Nova Scotia Voyageurs	AHL	49	1	12	13	119	4	0	0	0	46
1980–81	Nova Scotia Voyageurs	AHL	70	5	12	17	298	6	0	0	0	15
1981–82	Nova Scotia Voyageurs	AHL	78	8	25	33	332	9	0	3	3	84
1982–83	Nova Scotia Voyageurs	AHL	70	3	22	25	180	7	0	2	2	24
1983–84	Montreal Canadiens	NHL	3	0	0	0	12	—	—	—	—	—
1983–84	Nova Scotia Voyageurs	AHL	53	2	18	20	155	6	0	3	3	25
1984–85	Sherbrooke Canadiens	AHL	4	0	1	1	19	—	—	—	—	—
1984–85	Nova Scotia Oilers	AHL	68	4	18	22	175	6	0	2	2	15
1985–86	Muskegon Lumberjacks	IHL	66	7	30	37	247	14	2	9	11	46
1986–87	Muskegon Lumberjacks	IHL	67	11	35	46	337	15	4	3	7	20
1987–88	Newmarket Saints	AHL	48	1	9	10	166	—	—	—	—	—
1988–89	Halifax Citadels	AHL	12	1	2	3	29	—	—	—	—	—
1988–89	Indianapolis Ice	IHL	34	0	7	7	105	—	—	—	—	—
AHL totals			452	25	119	144	1473	38	0	10	10	209
NHL totals			3	0	0	0	12	—	—	—	—	—

=== NHL coaching statistics ===
Team	Year	Regular season						Postseason
Team	Year	G	W	L	T	Pts	Finish	Result
Ottawa Senators	1995–96	25	2	22	1	5	6th in Northeast	Fired

Preceded by Paul Cook	Head coach of the Kingston Frontenacs; 1992–94	Succeeded by Gary Agnew
Preceded by Rick Bowness	Head coach of the Ottawa Senators; 1995–1996	Succeeded by Jacques Martin
