= Mark Farina =

American disc jockey and musician

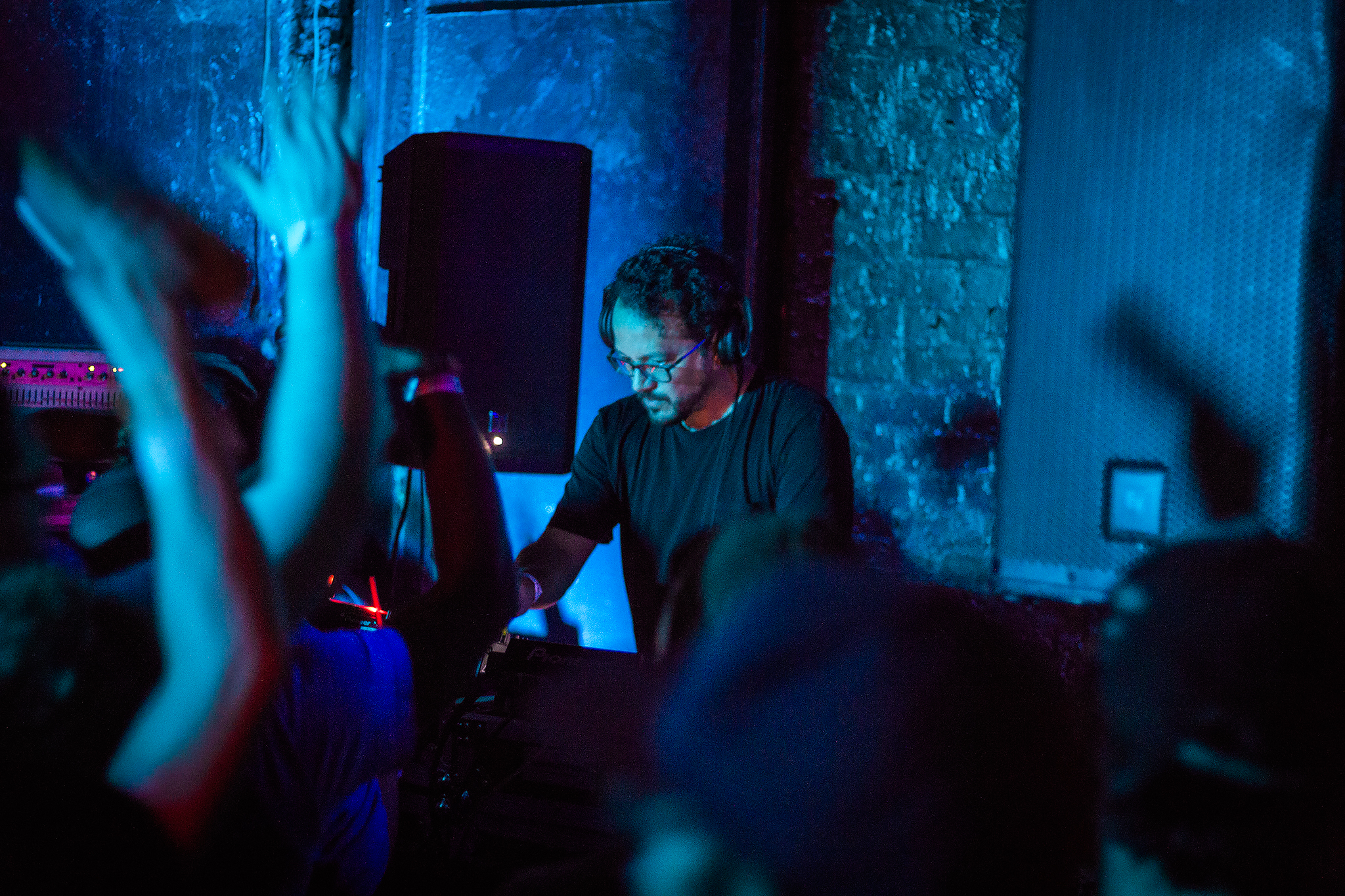
- Mark Farina in 2015

Background information
- Born: Mark Farina
- Genres: House, acid jazz, downtempo
- Occupation: DJ
- Years active: 1988–present
- Labels: KMS Records (1989); Om Records (1996–2011)
- Website: djmarkfarina.net

Mark Farina is an American disc jockey and musician, known for his Chicago house, acid jazz and downtempo works. His notable releases include Mood (KMS Records, 1989) and the Mushroom Jazz series (1996–2016). He is primarily identified with the house music scenes in his hometown of Chicago, and San Francisco, California.

== Biography ==
Shortly after Farina became friends with Derrick Carter in 1988 at a record store in Chicago, he developed an interest in house music. Farina experimented with a deeper style, dropping De La Soul, disco classics and other styles not being played in the main rooms of nightclubs. While exploring purist forms of house music, Farina developed his trademark style, known as "mushroom jazz": acid jazz infused with the West Coast's jazzy, organic productions along with urban beats.

Fans embraced Farina's downtempo style, and he started in 1992 a weekly Mushroom Jazz club night in San Francisco with Patty Ryan. In 3 years at the club, Farina and Mushroom Jazz established a following. When the club closed, Farina continued the tradition by releasing a series of CDs under the same name, Mushroom Jazz. His house sets have been described as the jazzy side of Chicago House mixed San Francisco style. URB, MUZIK and BPM magazines have all had him on their 'Top DJs in the World' lists. In 2000, Farina was ranked at number 72 on the DJ Mag Top 100 DJs list.

== Discography (selected releases) ==
- Geograffiti EP (Great Lakes Audio)
- Mushroom Jazz series
  - Mushroom Jazz 8 (Innercise/MRI)
  - Mushroom Jazz 7 (Innercise/MRI)
  - Mushroom Jazz 6 (Om)
  - Mushroom Jazz 5 (Om)
  - Mushroom Jazz 4 (Om)
  - Mushroom Jazz 3 (Om)
  - Mushroom Jazz 2 (Om)
  - Mushroom Jazz 1 (Om)
- Fabric 40 (Fabric)
- Live in Tokyo (Om)
- House of OM (Om)
- Sessions (MOS)
- Seasons (Moonshine)
- Imperial Dub (Imperial)
- United DJs of America (DMC)
- San Francisco Sessions (Om)
- Connect (Om)
- Live at Om w/Derrick Carter (Om)
- Air Farina (Om)
- Bes' Enatainment EP (Great Lakes Audio)
