= King Kooba =

British electronica duo

- Origin: London, England
- Genres: Electronica; funk; soul; Latin; jazz; hip hop
- Years active: 1998–present
- Labels: Om Records
- Members: Matt Harris (DJ Shuff); Charlie Tate (Colossus)

King Kooba is the duo of producer Matt Harris (DJ Shuff) and Charlie Tate (also known as Colossus). They are an electronica DJ duo from the United Kingdom. Legend says that they were formed over a pint of beer at Charlie's Mom's pub in London, England. They are currently signed to the Om Records label, and have done work for many of their compilations, such as the Om Lounge series. Their style consists of a mixture of funk, soul, Latin, jazz, and hip hop, with some electronic elements such as synthesizers and drum machines. Some of their music, such as the song "Blue Mosque", are influenced by Middle Eastern.

Their third album, nufoundfunk, released in 2000, was especially well-reviewed. Sharon O'Connell of The Times called it "an impressively savvy swing through neo-funk, ambient house, jazz'n'bass, hip-hop and soul." DJ Magazine called it one of the best of the year.

== Discography ==
Indian Summer
Review scores
Source	Rating
URB	3.5/5 stars

=== Albums ===
- The Imperial Solution (1998)
- Enter The Throne Room (1999)
- nufoundfunk (2000)
- Indian Summer (2002)
- The Score (2008)
- Return of The King (2021)

=== Remixes ===
- J Boogie's Dubtronic Science
- Naked Music NYC
- Charlie Parker

=== Remixes of King Kooba ===
- Michael Tello
- Afro-Mystik
- Kaskade
- Ski Oakenfull
