= Flashdance (soundtrack) =

Flashdance: Original Soundtrack from the Motion Picture

Soundtrack album by various artists
- Released: April 11, 1983
- Recorded: 1981–1983
- Genres: Electro; Euro disco; hi-NRG; synth-pop; pop rock
- Length: 36:52
- Labels: Casablanca; PolyGram
- Producers: Giorgio Moroder; Pete Bellotte; Phil Ramone; Ronald Magness; Keith Olsen; Michael Sembello

Singles from Flashdance: Original Soundtrack from the Motion Picture
- 1. "Flashdance... What a Feeling" Released: March 1983; 2. "Maniac" Released: May 1983; 3. "Lady, Lady, Lady" Released: October 1983; 4. "Manhunt" Released: April 1984

Flashdance: Original Soundtrack from the Motion Picture is the soundtrack to the 1983 film Flashdance, which tells the story of Alex Owens (played by Jennifer Beals), a welder and exotic dancer who dreams of becoming a professional ballerina. The nightclub performances by Alex and her co-workers and other set pieces involving training and auditioning provided opportunities to present the songs that would make up the soundtrack album. The film's music supervisor, Phil Ramone, made selections that he felt were the best fit for their respective scenes, and composer Giorgio Moroder contributed additional tracks in the process of scoring the film. One of his contributions, "Flashdance... What a Feeling" by Irene Cara, was released as a single in March 1983, weeks before the film's April 15 release, and eventually spent six weeks at number one on the Billboard Hot 100. The soundtrack was released on April 11, 1983 by Casablanca Records.

When the film became a surprise success, the soundtrack sold out within days, and the record company was left scrambling to fill orders that totaled half a million copies. Music videos for some of the songs on the soundtrack were then put together using scenes from the film, and the next single, "Maniac" by Michael Sembello, had one of these promotional video clips shown regularly on MTV and also reached number one on the Hot 100. Because Flashdance distributor Paramount Pictures had success with a film that had no star power and received unfavorable reviews from critics, the use of the cable channel as a means of promoting films through music videos and advertising became the major new marketing strategy for motion picture studios.

Despite lukewarm reviews from critics, the soundtrack spent two weeks at number one on the Billboard 200 and has been certified six-times platinum by the Recording Industry Association of America (RIAA), while selling 20 million copies worldwide, becoming one of the best selling albums of all time. Its music garnered nine Grammy Award nominations, including an Album of the Year nod for all of the artists on the album, and won three, one of which was for Best Album of Original Score Written for a Motion Picture or a Television Special that went to all of the songwriters credited. Cara received high acclaim for "Flashdance...What a Feeling", winning the Grammy Award for Best Pop Vocal Performance, Female, and both the Academy Award and Golden Globe Award for Best Original Song with Moroder and her co-lyricist, Keith Forsey. The vocalists who had singles released from the soundtrack album all continued to work with the same producers for their next or, in most cases, first albums of solo material, only to varying degrees of success.

== Background and development ==
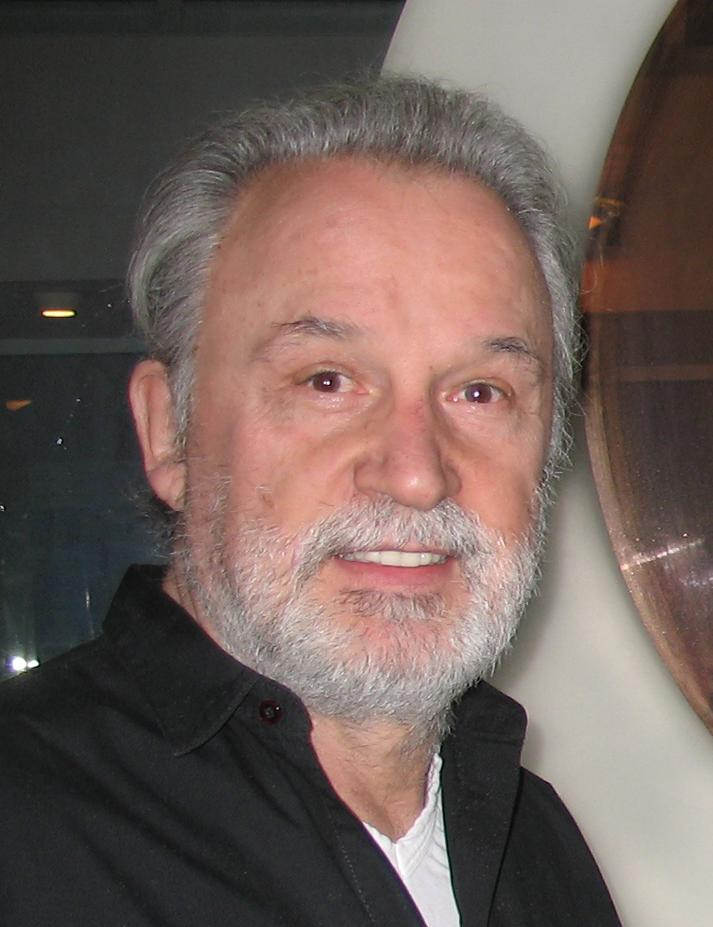
Giorgio Moroder composed the Flashdance score.

Flashdance producer Jerry Bruckheimer had collaborated with Academy Award-winning composer Giorgio Moroder on the 1980 film American Gigolo and sent him the script for the story of welder-turned-dancer Alex Owens as soon as he had received it to give him a sense of the music they were looking for. Despite his lack of interest due to other commitments, Moroder came up with some music that was "a very rough sketch". He thought it might fit the project well and sent it in before filming began. The demo was the music for what became the song "Flashdance... What a Feeling", but Moroder still had not committed to the project by the end of filming. The title of the film suggested that the subject matter might be somewhat racy, so he told Bruckheimer he would decide after watching the film. He received a rough cut on videotape that he enjoyed and did agree to compose the score. He also delegated the writing of the demo lyrics to Keith Forsey, who later received help from Irene Cara.

The film's music supervisor, Grammy-winning producer Phil Ramone, selected several of the other songs to be heard in the film and helped in deciding where they would be best put to use, but director Adrian Lyne was especially insistent upon using another demo they had received. He said, "One of the tunes I'd heard had a kind of a chime in it, that kind of 'bing-bong-bing-bong-bing-bong', like that, and I said, 'Let's use that. Let's use that as a kind of a motive, as a kind of a driving thing for a dance.'" That song, "Maniac", had very few lyrics to go with it, but Lyne had grown so accustomed to working with it during production that Ramone and the song's co-writer and performer, Michael Sembello, quickly went to work on giving it all of the necessary finishing touches.

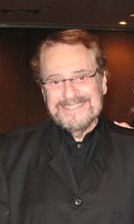
Phil Ramone was Flashdance's music supervisor.

In his 2007 autobiography Making Records: The Scenes Behind the Music, Ramone wrote, "For a musical to be successful there has to be a reason for each song." When he was interviewed for the Special Collector's Edition DVD release of Flashdance in 2010, he said, "I think all of the songs had a place," and one example he described was the Shandi Sinnamon track, "He's a Dream". The first dance sequence in the film presents Alex at her nighttime gig performing a dance routine that involves having water splash down onto the stage, and Ramone saw how that particular song, in which Sinnamon contributes some growling and moaning to her first-person account of being approached by an attractive man in a bar, was a good fit for such an extreme dance number. He said, "The creative side of this was to do something bizarre to get your attention, so 'He's a Dream' is, like, totally off the wall."

For another scene in which a dancer wearing an umpire's mask does a backflip off of a brick wall, Ramone wanted something equally bold. Two college students had sent him the song "Manhunt", and he was unaware that his production assistant arranged for the demo to be sung by his soon-to-be-wife, Karen Kamon. "I wouldn't have suggested that she audition; I didn't think that mixing business and family would be a smart move." Kamon never thought the song would make the final cut of the film, let alone that she would be performing it on Solid Gold a year later.

Ramone is credited as one of the songwriters on Laura Branigan's contribution to the album, "Imagination", and she acknowledged him for giving it what she described as "a little more of a New York sound. It has one foot on the curb and one in the street". When it came to writing a ballad for Alex's soul-searching moments before her big audition, however, he asked Kim Carnes for a contribution, and she co-wrote and performed "I'll Be Here Where the Heart Is". The only track on the album that was not completed for use in the film was by Donna Summer. Moroder and Pete Bellotte produced "Romeo" in 1981 for her I'm a Rainbow album, which went unreleased until 1996.

Summer's "Heaven Knows" partner, Brooklyn Dreams vocalist Joe "Bean" Esposito, contributed another ballad, "Lady, Lady, Lady", which interweaves Alex's maturation and her budding relationship. Moroder also had Esposito record a vocal demo for "Flashdance... What a Feeling" but did not have the final say as to who would record the version to be used in the film. He said, "I would have liked him to do the song for the film, but the film company wanted to have a bigger name." Cara's agreement to write the lyrics hinged on being the one to sing the song, but the film's producers had their own reasons for ruling out a male singer in that they felt that "the song should be sung from the female perspective." Esposito did, however, record the background vocals for the song with Stephanie Spruill and Maxine Willard Waters. Years later he said, "I remember everyone just going through the motions when all of the songs for the Flashdance soundtrack were being recorded. I don't think any of us thought it would be the success that it was." He also admitted that he felt lucky to have been on the album at all and that his duet with Summer would not have been enough for him to be considered for something that was expected to do well. "I think it was only because no one thought the movie was any good, and as a result, didn't pay any attention to who was going to be on the soundtrack."

Branigan had the distinction of having two songs included in the final cut of the film, the second being her 1982 hit single "Gloria", which was not included on the soundtrack album. Other artists whose recordings are listed in the closing credits but did not make the final track selection include Joan Jett and the Blackhearts ("I Love Rock and Roll"), The Jimmy Castor Bunch ("It's Just Begun"), and The London Symphony Orchestra (Lee Holdridge, conductor) ("Adagio in G Minor" by Remo Giazotto). A selection from Bizet's Carmen, "Avec la garde montante", was used in the scene in which Alex mimics a traffic cop but was uncredited.

== Release and promotion ==
Polygram only shipped 60,000 [copies of the soundtrack], so they really had no faith in the record.

— Producer Jerry Bruckheimer

The soundtrack was released on April 11, 1983 by Casablanca Records to unexpected success. The first public showing of the film before opening day hinted at how well the audience would respond to the soundtrack. Ramone received a call from Paramount Pictures executive Dawn Steel, who breathlessly exclaimed that audience members at the screening were dancing in the aisles. Paramount, which distributed Flashdance on April 15, 1983, did not think it would do well at the box office after many requests they made of Lyne to shorten the film before the release date from its original length of 140 minutes. As a result, Bruckheimer explained, "Polygram only shipped 60,000 [copies of the soundtrack], so they really had no faith in the record." During the opening weekend, he and his fellow Flashdance producer, Don Simpson, watched a series of young audience members go from the movie theater where it played in Westwood to a nearby record store to purchase the album. Copies of the soundtrack at that store sold out that day and took a few weeks to restock.

By Tuesday, April 19, retailers were reporting that all Flashdance merchandise was gone, so the push was on to get more records in stores. "Polygram took orders for over 500,000 copies of the album in 10 days, making it eligible for gold status after the 60-day certification period required by the Recording Industry Association of America." Paramount took advantage of the music's popularity by using Cara's version of "Flashdance... What a Feeling" in all subsequent radio and television ads for the film as a way for potential ticket buyers to "identify the motion picture" and also using the "What a Feeling" portion of the title in print ads. One studio executive described the soundtrack album as the "backbone" of the film's marketing campaign.

=== Singles and videos ===
In March, Cara's recording of "Flashdance... What a Feeling" became the "scout" single for the film—sent to radio stations and record stores ahead of the release of the movie and soundtrack. It made its debut on the Billboard Hot 100 in the issue of the magazine dated April 2, 1983, and spent 25 weeks there, six of which were at number one. It also spent five weeks at number two on their list of the most popular Black Singles in the US and got as high as number four on their Adult Contemporary chart that spring. At the same time, the twelve-inch remix spent three weeks in the top spot on the magazine's Dance/Disco Top 80 chart. Cara made promotional appearances to perform the song on April 30 telecasts of both American Bandstand and Solid Gold.

The May 7 issue of Cash Box reported on the surprise success of the film and Paramount's plan to have Lyne take parts of scenes from it to create music videos to be shown on the cable channel MTV as well as on television programs and at other venues featuring such clips. The studio explained that dance clubs at the time were more and more likely to have videocassette recorders and large projection screens for showing music videos and sometimes even video jockeys presenting them. The five songs chosen for the videos were the Cara single along with "Maniac", "Manhunt", "Romeo", and "Imagination", and two of the five were listed on the reports that MTV provided to Billboard and Cash Box that indicated what videos were in rotation on the cable network. Sembello's "Maniac" made its first appearance there in the May 21 issue of each publication, while Summer's "Romeo" debuted on the playlist in both publications a week later.

Of its four Billboard chart runs, "Maniac" made its first appearance on the Hot 100 in the June 4 issue and spent 22 weeks there, two of which were in the top spot. It also made it to number six on the Dance/Disco Top 80 and number 34 on both the Top Rock Tracks and Adult Contemporary charts. Billboard's Chartbeat column bemoaned the latter appearance as a "sign of the times", noting that "AC clearly isn't just for Anne Murray anymore." Sembello performed the song on Solid Gold on June 18 and American Bandstand on September 10. Although "He's a Dream" was not released as a single, Sinnamon made a promotional appearance to perform the song on Solid Gold on September 24.

The third single released from the soundtrack, Esposito's "Lady, Lady, Lady", peaked at number 86 during its two weeks on the Hot 100 in October of that year and number 36 over the course of four weeks on the Adult Contemporary chart that began in Billboard's November 12 issue. Kamon's "Manhunt" was released as a single in April 1984 but did not reach any of the Billboard charts despite her Solid Gold appearance on May 19 of that year.

== Critical reception ==
Professional ratings
Review scores
Source	Rating
AllMusic	3.5/5 stars
Robert Christgau	B−
Record Mirror	2/5 stars

At the time of its release, New York Times pop music critic John Rockwell narrowed down the two best features of the album to the title track and Moroder, noting, "Had he composed the entire score, it might have had a convincing unity, since his work with repetitive rhythms and synthesizer textures retains a distinctive appeal." He lamented, however, that "the LP is really a potpourri, and too much of the music here is in the glossy, corporate dance-rock idiom that gluts the airwaves these days." Although the Kim Carnes track, "I'll Be Here Where the Heart Is", rose above the rest for him as "vaguely affecting", he felt the tone of the film had a negative impact on the songs, writing, "by and large the music serves to remind anyone who's seen the film of its most cynical aspects."

Robert Christgau was also disappointed in the lack of focus: "Ten different singers collaborate with half a dozen producers to collapse a myriad of pop polarities onto one all-inclusive rock-disco concept soundtrack." While he did give the album a grade of B−, he found the project to be quite generic: "Tenors and contraltos, guitars and synthesizers, lust and love, ballads and DOR--all are equal as these mostly undistinguished, mostly quite functional artistes proceed through their mostly undistinguished, mostly quite functional material." He also attributes the focus on dance music to the theme in the film that dancing is a passion that Alex must express. "Concept: the overinsistent beat, which signifies how compulsively they seek a good time that retains shreds of both meaning and ecstatic release."

Stereo Review critic Phyl Garland was much more appreciative of the effort, especially with regard to the "exceptionally spirited performances" and the "notable crispness and sonic brilliance, with synthesizer effects that are at times positively haunting." He had specific praise for Shandi, writing that her "taunting treatment of 'He's a Dream' is notable for its gutsy relish." He also pointed out, "There are some dogs tucked into the corners—Donna Summer's hiccupped 'Romeo' left me cold, and Cycle V is absurd chanting 'Soo-duce me tonight'—but in general I like the crackling energy of this album."

== Accolades ==
The music from the Flashdance soundtrack was nominated for nine Grammy Awards and won three: Best Pop Vocal Performance, Female, which went to Cara for "Flashdance... What a Feeling", Best Album of Original Score Written for a Motion Picture or a Television Special, which went to all of the songwriters credited on the album, and Best Instrumental Composition, which went to Moroder for "Love Theme from Flashdance". The performer of that instrumental track, Helen St. John, was nominated for the Grammy Award for Best Pop Instrumental Performance, and Sembello was nominated for Best Pop Vocal Performance, Male, and Song of the Year with songwriting partner Dennis Matkosky. Cara and Sembello also each received nominations for Record of the Year for their respective hits, and they joined Branigan, Carnes, Esposito, Kamon, St. John, Sinnamon, Summer, and "Seduce Me Tonight" performers Cycle V in the nomination for Album of the Year.

"Flashdance... What a Feeling" and "Maniac" were both nominated in the Academy Award and Golden Globe categories for Best Original Song, the former nominee winning the Moroder-Forsey-Cara songwriting team statuettes at both ceremonies. Moroder also won the Golden Globe Award for Best Original Score and was nominated in the same category at the BAFTA Film Awards, and the title track was also nominated for the Best Original Song BAFTA. The music video for "Maniac" was awarded Best Editing at Billboard magazine's Video Music Awards, and the soundtrack also garnered three American Music Award nominations: Favorite Pop/Rock Album, Favorite Pop/Rock Song for the title track, and Favorite Soul/R&B Female Artist for Cara.

In 1998, "Flashdance... What a Feeling" came in at number nine on Billboard magazine's list of the top 10 soundtrack songs, and on the Songs of the Century list compiled by the Recording Industry Association of America in 2001, the song was listed at number 256. In 2004, it finished at number 55 on AFI's 100 Years ... 100 Songs survey of top tunes in American cinema, and in 2011, Time magazine included the album on its list of the "Top 25 Movie Soundtracks". When Rolling Stone magazine ranked the 20 Greatest Best Song Oscar Performances in 2016, Cara's appearance at the 1984 Academy Awards was listed at number 20. In 2018, Insider included the title song on its list of 35 of the most iconic movie songs of all time, generously adding that it "has a special place in pop culture history." That same year, it came in at number 34 on Billboard's list of the "600 most massive smashes over the [Hot 100]'s six decades", and in 2019, the magazine ranked the song at number 11 on its list of the Greatest of All Time Hot 100 Songs by Women. In 2024, the soundtrack was included in Rolling Stone's list of the 101 Greatest Soundtracks of All Time.

== Commercial performance ==
In the United States, the album debuted on Billboard magazine's Top LPs & Tape chart in the issue dated April 30, 1983, and spent 78 weeks there. In contrast to the 60,000 copies that were initially shipped to stores, the magazine reported in its May 21 issue that one-day sales to that point had crested at 140,000. The Recording Industry Association of America awarded the album both gold and platinum status on June 17, 1983, and the June 25 issue marked its ninth week on the chart and its first of two consecutive weeks as the number-one album in the US, temporarily supplanting Michael Jackson's Thriller. The soundtrack was certified five-times platinum by the Recording Industry Association of America (RIAA) on October 12, 1984, for shipments of five million units and received its next award for reaching six million on June 21, 1996.

In Canada, the soundtrack made its first appearance on RPM's 100 Albums chart on the issue dated May 7, 1983, and peaked at number two on June 11, spending 72 weeks on the chart. It was certified nine-times Platinum in Canada on December 17, 1985, denoting shipments in excess of 900,000 units. It debuted on the UK Albums Chart on July 2, 1983, and peaked at number nine, spending 30 weeks altogether on the chart. It was certified gold by the British Phonographic Industry (BPI) on September 21, 1983, denoting shipments of 100,000 units. In Japan, the album became the biggest-selling album of 1983, spending ten weeks at the number-one position. The soundtrack also reached number one on the album charts in Australia, Austria, Germany, Norway, Sweden, and Switzerland, where it also was certified four-times Platinum, denoting shipments of 200,000 units. Other Gold and Platinum certifications included Finland (81,000 units), France (100,000), Germany (500,000), Hong Kong (20,000), and Spain (100,000). In 2011, Time magazine's list of the "Top 25 Movie Soundtracks" reported that sales of the album had reached 20 million copies.

2016 Giorgio Moroder donated the 13 platinum discs for Flashdance to the Museum Gherdëina in his hometown.

== Legacy and influence ==
No one at Paramount Pictures really expected Flashdance to usher in a whole revolution in film marketing.

— The Rolling Stone Review: 1985

Ramone's logic of having a reason for each song did not go unnoticed in the industry. Gary LeMel, the senior vice-president of music at Columbia Pictures, described the way the tone of the songs in Flashdance matched the images onscreen as "the beginning of the new consistency" in soundtracks. This focus on the matching of sound and image was serendipitous as well. The simultaneous successes of the film and soundtrack were a watershed moment in the entertainment industry in that many of its experts suddenly became aware of the added value of the two-year old MTV cable channel as a promotional tool for movies through use of music videos and commercial advertising. Danny Goldberg, contemporary music consultant to 20th Century-Fox for feature films, said, "It started with Flashdance," and MTV's vice president of programming, Les Garland, concurred. "Flashdance was the picture that brought all the [movie] studios into the music video field." Writing for The Rolling Stone Review: 1985, Marianne Meyer acknowledged the release date of the film as the turning point: "The new age began in April 1983. No one at Paramount Pictures really expected Flashdance to usher in a whole revolution in film marketing."

Ticket sales during the opening weekend of a film have been seen by the industry as a strong indicator of the picture's success or failure, and Goldberg opined in an essay in Billboard that if there is no box-office draw for a release, then a music video can stir interest in the potential audience for the movie more than any of the other options available. Frank Mancuso, who was the president of the motion picture division at Paramount, said the studio's approach was to "make music one of a picture's main cast elements, especially when, as in the case of Flashdance, the actors are not that well known," so the studios would be reliant on hit singles for the star power the film was lacking. As LeMel explained to Variety, music video outlets, such as MTV, provided the perfect fit since the twelve to twenty-five year-olds that those outlets want for viewers is the same demographic that Hollywood goes after. Paramount vice president Gordon Weaver marveled that the young MTV audience was "a godsend," and a marketing executive for another studio credited the distributor for this expansion of marketing strategy: "Paramount didn't know what they had [with Flashdance], but they knew where to sell it. The MTV buys allowed them to aim a shotgun directly at their target, instead of scattering buckshot through a general TV approach."

The extensive exposure that the "Maniac" video received from MTV and other outlets helped Paramount plug the film for free instead of paying the several million dollars of commercial time for the standard television advertising exposure needed to get the same result. Weaver described this approach as "invisible marketing." Flashdance went on to be the third highest-grossing film of 1983 in the US despite having unknown actors and receiving bad reviews, so the new priority for studio marketing departments became evaluating how practical it would be to include popular music in the projects they were looking to release in order to receive similar benefits from such outlets. "Blame it on Flashdance," averred Time magazine's film critic, Jay Cocks, with regard to the seeming infiltration of the video clip trend into movie packaging. "The Flashdance phenomenon was a confluence of good commercial instincts and some savvy guesswork, and now that Hollywood has found a new formula, indeed helped create one, it will not let go," he argued, citing music video directors moving into feature films and a slate of releases due in 1984 that incorporated contemporary music.

== Aftermath ==
Some of the artists with singles from the soundtrack included their contributions on follow-up albums on which they chose to continue working with the producer of their Flashdance recording, and for some, the soundtrack provided the career momentum to record an entire album as a solo vocalist for the first time. In the case of Esposito, that meant being the "featured" vocalist on the album Solitary Men, on which Moroder was the main artist and producer in addition to co-writing most of the new tracks (as did "Lady, Lady, Lady" lyricist Forsey). Sembello opted to continue working with Ramone as the producer for his debut LP, Bossa Nova Hotel, which afforded him two more US chart hits: the number 34 Hot 100 entry "Automatic Man" and "Talk", which reached number 25 on the Adult Contemporary chart. While Kamon did stick with her "Manhunt" producer and life partner Ramone to helm her 1984 album Heart of You, her soundtrack song was not among the nine included on it, despite having been released as a single earlier in the year.

The film's title song arguably gave Cara the biggest career boost that any of the soundtrack artists would gain from their own contributions. Moroder produced her next album, which included their recent hit and shortened the song's title for the name What a Feelin', and Moroder also wrote the music for seven of the 10 new tracks. One of the seven, "Why Me?", also reunited Cara with co-lyricist Forsey and was released as the first new single from the album later that year, reaching number 13 on the Hot 100. Three more pop chart entries came from the album: "The Dream (Hold On to Your Dream)", which was recorded for the soundtrack of D.C. Cab and peaked at number 37, the number 8 entry "Breakdance", and a ballad that got as high as number 78, "You Were Made for Me".

As these chart hits kept Cara in the spotlight into the first half of 1984 when she was receiving various awards for "Flashdance... What a Feeling", her success was bittersweet. Her belief was that she was not being sufficiently compensated for the recordings she had made since signing with Network Records, and she eventually filed a lawsuit against the label and Al Coury, Inc. over the issue. A Los Angeles County Superior Court awarded her $1.5 million in 1993, but because the defendants declared bankruptcy, her win was "largely a symbolic one." She did, however, begin receiving royalties for her work.

== Track listing ==
Side one
No.	Title	Writer(s)	Performer	Length
1.	"Flashdance... What a Feeling"	Giorgio Moroder; Keith Forsey; Irene Cara	Irene Cara	3:53
2.	"He's a Dream"	Shandi Sinnamon; Ronald Magness	Shandi Sinnamon	3:28
3.	"Love Theme from Flashdance"	Moroder	Helen St. John	3:27
4.	"Manhunt"	Doug Cotler; Richard Gilbert	Karen Kamon	2:36
5.	"Lady, Lady, Lady"	Moroder; Forsey	Joe Esposito	4:09
Total length:				17:33

Side two
No.	Title	Writer(s)	Performer	Length
1.	"Imagination"	Michael Boddicker; Jerry Hey; Phil Ramone; Michael Sembello	Laura Branigan	3:35
2.	"Romeo"	Pete Bellotte; Sylvester Levay	Donna Summer	3:13
3.	"Seduce Me Tonight"	Moroder; Forsey	Cycle V	3:31
4.	"I'll Be Here Where the Heart Is"	Kim Carnes; Duane Hitchings; Craig Krampf	Kim Carnes	4:36
5.	"Maniac"	Sembello; Dennis Matkosky	Michael Sembello	4:04
Total length:				18:59

== Personnel ==
Credits adapted from the album's liner notes.

- Giorgio Moroder – producer ("Flashdance... What a Feeling", "Love Theme from Flashdance", "Lady, Lady, Lady", "Romeo", "Seduce Me Tonight")
- Ronald Magness – producer ("He's a Dream")
- Phil Ramone – producer ("Manhunt", "Imagination", "Maniac")
- Pete Bellotte – producer ("Romeo")
- Keith Olsen – producer ("I'll Be Here Where the Heart Is")
- Michael Sembello – producer ("Maniac")
- Mo Strom – album design

== Charts ==
=== Weekly charts ===
Weekly chart performance for Flashdance
Chart (1983)	Peak position
Australian Albums (Kent Music Report)	1
Austrian Albums (Ö3 Austria)	1
Canada Top Albums/CDs (RPM)	2
Dutch Albums (Album Top 100)	9
Finnish Albums (Suomen virallinen lista)	1
German Albums (Offizielle Top 100)	1
Icelandic Albums (Tónlist)	4
Italian Albums (Musica e dischi)	1
Japanese Albums (Oricon)	1
New Zealand Albums (RMNZ)	2
Norwegian Albums (VG-lista)	1
Swedish Albums (Sverigetopplistan)	1
Swiss Albums (Schweizer Hitparade)	1
UK Albums (Official Charts)	9
US Billboard 200	1
US Top R&B/Hip-Hop Albums (Billboard)	6

=== Year-end charts ===
1983 year-end chart performance for Flashdance
Chart (1983)	Position
Australian Albums (Kent Music Report)	5
Austrian Albums (Ö3 Austria)	13
Canada Top Albums/CDs (RPM)	4
Dutch Albums (Album Top 100)	82
German Albums (Offizielle Top 100)	8
Japanese Albums (Oricon)	1
New Zealand Albums (RMNZ)	16
UK Albums (Gallup)	73
US Billboard 200	20
US Top R&B/Hip-Hop Albums (Billboard)	21
US Soundtrack Albums (Billboard)	1

1984 year-end chart performance for Flashdance
Chart (1984)	Position
Austrian Albums (Ö3 Austria)	17
Canada Top Albums/CDs (RPM)	72
German Albums (Offizielle Top 100)	45
US Billboard 200	32
US Soundtrack Albums (Billboard)	4

== Certifications and sales ==
Certifications and sales for Flashdance
Region	Certification	Certified units/sales
Brazil	—	240,000
Canada (Music Canada)	9× Platinum	900,000^{^}
Finland	—	81,635
France (SNEP)	Gold	1,000,000
Germany (BVMI)	Platinum	500,000^{^}
Hong Kong (IFPI Hong Kong)	Platinum	20,000^{*}
Italy	—	200,000
Japan	—	1,061,000
Spain (Promusicae)	Platinum	100,000^{^}
Switzerland (IFPI Switzerland)	4× Platinum	200,000^{^}
United Kingdom (BPI)	Gold	100,000^{^}
United States (RIAA)	6× Platinum	6,000,000^{^}
Venezuela	—	148,000
Yugoslavia	—	67,635
Summaries
Worldwide	—	20,000,000
^{*} Sales figures based on certification alone.^{^} Shipments figures based on certification alone.

== See also ==
- List of best-selling albums
- List of best-selling albums in Japan
