= D.C. Cab (soundtrack) =

Soundtrack album by Various artists
- Released: 1983
- Recorded: 1983
- Genres: Pop; R&B
- Length: 37:07
- Label: MCA Records
- Producers: Giorgio Moroder; Pete Bellotte; Richard Feldman; Rick Kelly; Larry John McNally; Phil Ramone; Edmund Sylvers

Singles from D.C. Cab: Music from the Original Motion Picture Soundtrack
- 1. "The Dream (Hold On to Your Dream)" Released: 1983; 2. "Deadline U.S.A." Released: 1984; 3. "D.C. Cab" Released: 1984

D.C. Cab: Music from the Original Motion Picture Soundtrack is the soundtrack to the 1983 film D.C. Cab. The producers selected artists for the album who were popular with a young, black audience, and the popularity of one of the film's stars, Mr. T, prompted the film's distributor Universal Pictures to release the film four months earlier than planned. D.C. Cab performed poorly at the box office, and the soundtrack peaked at number 181 on the Billboard 200 album chart.

The first of the three singles released from the album, "The Dream (Hold On to Your Dream)" by Irene Cara, had some success on multiple singles charts in the US and had a music video that received airplay on MTV. Cara later claimed in a lawsuit that her musical contribution was arranged by Al Coury, the head of her record company. The two other singles, "Deadline U.S.A." by Shalamar and the film's title song "D.C. Cab" by Peabo Bryson scored on the Black Singles chart.

Critics in Billboard gave the album high marks, whereas the reviewer for AllMusic gave it one-and-a-half stars.

== Background ==
The score for D.C. Cab was written by Giorgio Moroder, who produced and wrote the music for several of the songs on the soundtrack album. The film's writer and producer, Topper Carew, explained how he chose the artists involved such as Shalamar, Peabo Bryson, and DeBarge: "We were looking for urban contemporary music acts who were particularly strong in the black community with young people, yet had the potential for crossing over."

Some plans to involve black artists in the film and/or soundtrack did not materialize. Carew mentioned an attempt to have Mr. T, one of the stars of the film, cut a rap record for the album that never happened. While Irene Cara and Karen Kamon made the final cut for the soundtrack, their fellow Flashdance soundtrack alums Cycle V did not, despite a December 1983 report of their involvement that also listed Musical Youth as part of the project. Musical Youth were even filmed for a scene in the movie that was left on the cutting room floor, while plans for Grandmaster Flash and the Furious Five to appear on-screen also fell through. A track titled "D.C. Cab" that is different than the Peabo Bryson song on this album was credited to Grandmaster Melle Mel and the Furious Five on the 1999 compilation Adventures on the Wheels of Steel.

D.C. Cab was originally slated for an April 1984 release in theaters, and the soundtrack from MCA Records was to be in stores in February. Because Mr. T.'s new television series The A-Team was a top ten hit in the Nielsen ratings, the film's distributor, Universal Pictures, decided to take advantage of his popularity by moving the film's release up to December 16, 1983. Plans that had been made to market the film using the cast before the original April opening date were canceled. Cara's What a Feelin' album had been released by Geffen Records on November 2, 1983, without the first single to be released from the soundtrack, "The Dream (Hold On to Your Dream)", but one of the film's executive producers, Jon Peters, arranged to have her album pulled from store shelves and reissued to include it. The movie opened in ninth place in its first weekend of release and earned a total of $16 million over the course of its theatrical run.

== Release ==
MCA had previously listed soundtracks at $9.98, but for D.C. Cab the list price was lowered to $8.98 because the company felt they "had a hit album regardless of the film's success." Because of the film's new release date, MCA was planning for the soundtrack to be on store shelves in December. The album was published on the New LP/Tape Releases list in Billboard in the January 14, 1984, issue and debuted in the February 11 issue on the magazine's Top LPs & Tapes chart, where it got as high as number 181 during its 4 weeks there. That same issue included its first appearance on the magazine's Black LPs chart, where it spent 7 weeks and peaked at number 56.

=== Singles ===
The first song released from the soundtrack was "The Dream (Hold On to Your Dream)" by Irene Cara, which debuted on the Billboard Hot 100 in the issue dated December 10, 1983, and peaked at number 37 over the course of the 14 weeks that it spent there. Its debut on Billboard's Black Singles chart in the December 24 issue began an 8-week run, during which time it reached number 65. The January 28, 1984 issue was the start of another 8-week run for the song, this time as a dance remix that made it to number 26 on the magazine's Dance/Disco Top 80 chart. That same issue also marked the first appearance of Shalamar's "Deadline U.S.A." on the Black Singles chart, where it peaked at number 34 over the course of its 10 weeks there. They also got to number 52 with it on the UK singles chart during their three weeks there in the spring of 1984. The title song, performed by Peabo Bryson, began 9 weeks on the Black Singles chart in the February 11 issue of Billboard and reached number 53.

=== Music video ===
The video for "The Dream" used scenes from the film alongside footage of Cara playing herself in her home and around the streets of London. The cabbies have sent her a note that reads, "We miss you, Irene! Your friends at D.C. Cab", and Cara lip-syncs and dances to the music as the comedic visual elements from the film are interwoven throughout. Billboard listed the clip in the New Videos Added section of its MTV Adds & Rotation column, which noted that it was added to the cable channel's playlist of music videos as of December 14 in the December 24 issue.

== Critical reception ==
Professional ratings
Review scores
Source	Rating
AllMusic	1.5/5 stars

The album received mixed reviews. At the time of its release, Billboard Dance Trax columnist Brian Chin insisted that the soundtrack was "an album to rave over" and had high praise for Moroder and Phil Ramone, describing the project as "a fascinating, satisfying indicator of how much study that team has put into new American production styles since creating the music for Flashdance." He liked Shalamar's "Deadline U.S.A." much more than their recent hit "Dead Giveaway" and described Champaign's "Knocks Me On My Feet" as being "in the very voguish vocal group/electronics fusion mode." Nelson George, then The Rhythm & The Blues columnist for Billboard, wrote that Peabo Bryson's title track was the best uptempo song that Bryson had ever sung.

In a retrospective review for AllMusic, J.T. Griffith dismissed the album as a "poor relic from the early Reagan era" that was "not up to the quality of the soundtracks for Fame, Flashdance, or Footloose."

== Aftermath ==
In 1985, Cara filed a lawsuit against Network Records and Al Coury, Inc., for, among other things, withholding most of the royalties she had earned from her recordings for the label. Coury, the former RSO executive who signed Cara to his newly-formed Network Records a few years earlier, was "acting like a manager, which he shouldn't have been doing," according to Cara. She alleges that "in a deal Coury arranged for her to participate in the music for D.C. Cab." A Los Angeles County Superior Court ruled in her favor in 1993, and she began receiving royalties.

== Track listing ==
Side one
No.	Title	Writer(s)	Performer	Length
1.	"The Dream (Hold On to Your Dream)"	Giorgio Moroder, Pete Bellotte, Irene Cara	Irene Cara	4:51
2.	"Deadline U.S.A."	Allee Willis, Danny Sembello, Dennis Matkosky	Shalamar	3:32
3.	"D.C. Cab"	Richard Feldman, Rick Kelly, Larry John McNally	Peabo Bryson	3:17
4.	"Knock Me On My Feet"	Moroder, Bellotte	Champaign	4:40
5.	"Squeeze Play"	Phil Galdston, Andy Goldmark	Karen Kamon	3:18
Total length:				19:38

Side two
No.	Title	Writer(s)	Performer	Length
1.	"World Champion"	Ron Finch, Daryl Ross	Leon Sylvers III	3:47
2.	"Single Heart"	Moroder, Bellotte	DeBarge	3:32
3.	"Party Me Tonight"	Moroder, Bellotte	Stephanie Mills	3:52
4.	"One More Time Around the Block Ophelia"	Phil Galdston, Peter Thom	Gary U.S. Bonds	3:16
5.	"Knock Me On My Feet (Instrumental)"	Moroder	Giorgio Moroder	3:02
Total length:				17:29

The following songs from the film are not included on the soundtrack album.

- "Vietnam" (Jimmy Cliff) – Jimmy Cliff
- "Why Baby Why" (Gary Busey) – Gary Busey

== Personnel ==
From the liner notes on both the album jacket and disc label:

- Giorgio Moroder – producer (all tracks included on the album except "D.C. Cab", "Squeeze Play", "World Champion", "One More Time Around the Block Ophelia")
- Pete Bellotte – producer ("Deadline U.S.A.")
- Richard Feldman – producer ("D.C. Cab")
- Rick Kelly – producer ("D.C. Cab")
- Larry John McNally – producer ("D.C. Cab")
- Phil Ramone – producer ("Squeeze Play", "One More Time Around the Block Ophelia")
- Edmund Sylvers – producer ("World Champion")
- Peter Guber – executive producer
- Jon Peters – executive producer
- Joel Schumacher – executive producer
- Ronny Vance – executive producer ("D.C. Cab")
- George Massenburg – mixer ("D.C. Cab")
- Amy Ross – music coordinator
- George Osaki – art direction
- Thomas Arnholt – design

== Chart positions ==
Chart (1984)	Peak position
U.S. Billboard 200	181
U.S. Billboard Top R&B Albums	56

== Bibliography ==
- Brooks, Tim; Marsh, Earle (1995), The Complete Directory to Prime Time Network and Cable TV Shows (1946—Present): Sixth Edition, Ballantine Books, ISBN 0345397363
- Guinn, Jeff; Perry, Douglas (2005), The Sixteenth Minute: Life in the Aftermath of Fame, Penguin Group, ISBN 1-58542-389-0
- Whitburn, Joel (1999), Joel Whitburn's Top R&B Albums, 1965-1998, Record Research Inc., ISBN 0898201349
- Whitburn, Joel (2004a), Joel Whitburn Presents Top R&B/Hip-Hop Singles, 1942-2004, Record Research Inc., ISBN 0898201608
- Whitburn, Joel (2004b), Joel Whitburn's Hot Dance/Disco, 1974-2003, Record Research Inc., ISBN 089820156X
- Whitburn, Joel (2009), Joel Whitburn's Top Pop Singles, 1955-2008, Record Research Inc., ISBN 978-0898201802
- Whitburn, Joel (2010), Joel Whitburn Presents Top Pop Albums, Seventh Edition, Record Research Inc., ISBN 978-0-89820-183-3
