= What a Feelin' =

Studio album by Irene Cara
- Released: November 2, 1983
- Recorded: 1983
- Studios: Electric Lady Studios; Northern Music Recorders (New York); Oasis Studio; Carla Ridge; Schnee Studio; Sunset Sound (Los Angeles)
- Genres: Dance-pop; Euro disco
- Labels: Network; Geffen; Epic; Unidisc
- Producers: Giorgio Moroder; James Newton Howard

Irene Cara chronology
Anyone Can See (1982)	What a Feelin' (1983)	Carasmatic (1987)

Singles from What a Feelin'
- 1. "Flashdance... What a Feeling" Released: March 1983; 2. "Why Me?" Released: October 1983; 3. "The Dream (Hold On to Your Dream)" Released: December 1983; 4. "Breakdance" Released: March 1984; 5. "You Were Made for Me" Released: July 1984

What a Feelin' is the second studio album by American singer-songwriter Irene Cara. Released on November 2, 1983, this album is a continuation of the work that Cara began with producer Giorgio Moroder on the soundtrack to the 1983 film Flashdance. The dance-pop song she co-wrote with Moroder and Keith Forsey for the film, "Flashdance... What a Feeling", went to number one on Billboard magazine's Hot 100 and foreshadowed the style of this album, which was unlike her R&B-heavy debut. Although Cara was more accustomed to composing music, she relinquished most of those duties to Moroder here and shifted much of her songwriting focus to lyrics.

The title of the album clued in record buyers to the inclusion of the soundtrack hit from the spring of that year, but another four songs would make the Hot 100, the first of which, "Why Me?", had been released in October. "The Dream (Hold On to Your Dream)" from the D.C. Cab soundtrack became the second new single when that movie was released in December, four months earlier than planned. Since the song was not on the original pressings of What a Feelin', those copies were removed from store shelves so that the album could be re-released to include it. The other two Hot 100 entries were Cara's last top ten hit, "Breakdance", and the one track on the album for which she did write the music, "You Were Made for Me".

The album received mixed-to-positive reviews and was moderately successful, reaching number 77 on Billboard's album chart. But while Cara was having hit records and receiving awards for "Flashdance... What a Feeling", she was also feeling ripped off by her record company, Network Records, and planning to sue. The lawsuit she filed resulted in a backlash that destroyed her reputation in the entertainment industry. It would be eight years before the courts would acknowledge the harm she suffered and she would begin receiving royalties for the recordings she had made since signing with the label.

== Background ==
In March 1983, Casablanca Records released the first single from the soundtrack to the upcoming Paramount Pictures film Flashdance, the story of a young woman who works as a welder and nightclub performer and dreams of becoming a ballerina. The music for that song, "Flashdance... What a Feeling", was written by the composer of the score for the film, Giorgio Moroder, and Irene Cara, who performed the song, wrote the lyrics with Keith Forsey. Their collaboration spent six weeks at number one on the Billboard Hot 100, and Moroder and Cara together completed two more projects in 1983 that were initially separate: Cara's next album, What a Feelin', and a song for the soundtrack of the film D.C. Cab titled "The Dream (Hold On to Your Dream)". Moroder also composed the score for that film and produced the soundtrack album. He wrote the music for the song, and Cara again sang and co-wrote the lyrics.

In a discussion of What a Feelin' with Billboard just after its release, Cara said, "I usually write music; it's only working with Giorgio that I've become a lyricist. I had no choice since he's a composer." Of the nine new tracks on the original album, Moroder wrote the music for six, but one of her compositions, "You Were Made for Me", made the final cut as the sole ballad and album closer. She insisted, "It's still very much Giorgio's album." Many of the same people who Moroder selected to work on "Flashdance... What a Feeling" joined her on this new project. Forsey assisted her with lyrics on four of the tracks, and the guitarist on her number-one hit, Richie Zito, arranged all of the new material, played instruments on most of the songs, and even co-wrote (with Arthur Barrow) the music on one of the other songs not composed by Moroder, "Keep On". The album also reunited Cara with two of her "Flashdance..." background vocalists, Joe Esposito and Stephanie Spruill, on the first new single from the album, "Why Me?".

== Release ==
What a Feelin' was released by Geffen Records on November 2, 1983, without "The Dream", which was to be on the D.C. Cab soundtrack album by MCA Records. Since the film was originally scheduled to be released in April 1984, the soundtrack was going to hit store shelves in February. D.C. Cab told the story of a taxi service in the nation's capital, and one of the cabbies was played by Mr. T., whose new television show The A-Team was a top ten hit in the Nielsen ratings. The film's distributor, Universal Pictures, wanted to take advantage of his popularity by moving the film's release up from the April 1984 slot to December 16, 1983. The release of the soundtrack album was also now moved up to December, but the loss of those four months that had been available for publicizing the film disrupted the plans that the studio had to market it using members of the cast. One of the film's executive producers, Jon Peters, then arranged to have What a Feelin' pulled from store shelves and reissued to include "The Dream".

What a Feelin' debuted on Billboard magazine's Top LPs & Tapes chart in the issue dated December 10, 1983, to start a 37-week run there and peaked at number 77 in the February 25, 1984, issue. AllMusic critic William Ruhlmann noted that the album struggled to stay in the top 100 of the 200 albums listed there and speculated that it was because people already had a copy of "Flashdance... What a Feeling" and "Cara never established a base beyond her individual hits." The album also spent 30 weeks on the magazine's Black LPs chart, where it made its highest showing at number 45 in the January 7 issue.

=== Singles ===
"Why Me?", the first official single from the album, debuted on the Billboard Hot 100 in the issue of the magazine dated October 22, 1983, to begin a fifteen-week run and peaked at number 13 for two weeks, which began in the December 3 issue. Upon the release of her next single, "The Dream (Hold On to Your Dream)", the review in Cash Box magazine pointed out that "Why Me?" was "still making its way up the charts." The December 10 issues of that magazine and Billboard both included the debut of "The Dream" on their respective lists of the 100 most popular singles in the US and listed "Why Me?" with bullets indicating noteworthy airplay and sales gains, giving her two songs moving up the charts at the same time.

"The Dream" peaked at number 37 on February 11, 1984, and stayed on the Hot 100 for a total of fourteen weeks. Her next single, "Breakdance", started its nineteen weeks there in the March 24, 1984, issue. It peaked at number eight in the June 9 issue and was her third and last top ten hit. "You Were Made for Me" was the final single from the album and her last song to make the Billboard Hot 100. It began its five weeks on the pop chart in the July 28, 1984, issue and peaked at number 78 in its third week there.

=== Music videos ===
Although a promotional video had not been planned for "Flashdance... What a Feeling", Flashdance distributor Paramount Pictures had the director Adrian Lyne compile clips exclusively from the film to create a music video for the song when the movie became a surprise hit in the spring of 1983. Cara did appear in the other two videos created for songs on What a Feelin', "Why Me?" and "The Dream". Both were directed and edited by Doug Dowdle and produced by Jeffrey Abelson.

The character Cara portrays in the video for "Why Me?" juggles two plot lines: her frustration as a performer going to auditions at Broadway theaters and finally having success while at the same time ending one relationship and finding another. Because the story takes place in Manhattan, Cara is filmed at various landmarks and theaters as she lip-syncs the song. Billboard listed the clip in the New Videos Added section of its MTV Adds & Rotation column, which noted that it was added to the cable channel's playlist of music videos as of December 7 in the magazine's December 17 issue, eight weeks after its debut on the Hot 100.

The video for "The Dream" used scenes from D.C. Cab alongside footage of Cara playing herself in her home and around the streets of London. The cabbies have sent her a note that reads, "We miss you, Irene! Your friends at D.C. Cab", and Cara lip-syncs and dances to the music as the comedic visual elements from the film are interwoven throughout. According to the MTV Adds & Rotation list, the video began airing on the cable channel on December 14, one week after "Why Me?" did.

== Critical reception ==
Professional ratings
Review scores
Source	Rating
AllMusic	4.5/5 stars
Robert Christgau	C+
The Encyclopedia of Popular Music	2/5 stars
The Rolling Stone Album Guide	2/5 stars

At the time of the album's release, Billboard Dance Trax columnist Brian Chin described it as "a well-executed piece of work on the part of both producer and artist" and made mention of the yet-to-be-released singles "Breakdance" and "The Dream (Hold On to Your Dream)" as "ace uptempo picks" that "beg for remixes." He added, "Cara should also please fans nostalgic for the robotic early [Donna] Summer sound with her slightly off, trance-like delivery of 'Romance '83' and 'Cue Me Up.'" Cash Box averred that "Flashdance... What a Feeling" and "Why Me?" were "just two of the sizzling singles from this consistent collection." They felt it was "strong on well-structured pop songs, often reminiscent of ABBA in 'Why Me?' and 'You Took My Life Away' with impeccable melodic turns." They concluded, "Many of the tunes sound suitable for follow-up singles because of their distinctive quality and Cara's vocal warmth."

In a contemporary review for The Village Voice, music critic Robert Christgau gave the album a "C+" grade but confused Cara's educational background with that of her Fame character, Coco Hernandez: "I wish she'd gotten her training in church rather than at Performing Arts." In a retrospective review, AllMusic's William Ruhlmann gave it four-and-a-half out of five stars and said that, even though she sang and co-wrote the lyrics, Cara was mostly "the mouthpiece of Euro-disco producer Giorgio Moroder on these recordings." The Rolling Stone Album Guide found that the title song was its only redeeming feature.

== Aftermath ==
In a 2018 interview, Cara described how the time of receiving awards for "Flashdance... What a Feeling" in early 1984 was also quite painful. "Unfortunately, I was going through a lot of hassles with my record company… So on the outside, I was putting on a face of being on top of the world and being a success, and on the inside I was trying to figure out how to sue my label." Al Coury, the former RSO executive who signed Cara to his newly formed Network Records a few years earlier, was "acting like a manager, which he shouldn't have been doing," according to Cara. Her musical contribution to D.C. Cab, for example, was something that Coury arranged. She confronted him about not receiving financial compensation for her first album or for "Flashdance... What a Feeling" but was given the runaround.

They blacklisted me.

— Irene Cara on the treatment she received from the recording industry after suing her label

In 1985, Cara filed a lawsuit against Network Records and Al Coury, Inc., for, among other things, withholding most of the royalties she had earned from her recordings for the label. She claimed that the backlash she endured from taking action against Coury cost her her "future as a recording artist", and believed that the company discouraged the other record labels from working with her because of her legal actions; she described it as being blacklisted. From that point on, record executives and film producers would have nothing to do with her. "Rumors swirled mercilessly about rampant drug use, spreading the notion that, in her early twenties, this great talent already had been hollowed out." The first team of lawyers she hired proved ineffective, and the lawsuit laid dormant until the early nineties when she found a lawyer willing to address what happened.

A Los Angeles County Superior Court awarded her $1.5 million in 1993 after concluding that her career was damaged as a result of the treatment she received, but her attorney, Tom Nunziato explained how actually getting the money was more complicated: "Because only the corporations [Al Coury Inc. and Network Records] were sued back in the beginning and not the individuals, the corporations just declared bankruptcy; supposedly they used all the money to pay attorneys… Irene was vindicated by the jury, but the legal system kind of fell down, and there was no way to compensate her." She did, however, begin earning royalties almost a decade after her last chart hit.

== 1997 CD reissue ==
Unidisc Music reissued What a Feelin' on compact disc in 1997 in an expanded edition that included dance remixes of "Flashdance... What a Feeling", "Why Me?", "The Dream", and "Breakdance" as well as an instrumental remix of the album's title song and the track that "The Dream" replaced on some editions of the 1983 reissue, "Talk Too Much". The dance remix of "Why Me?" was the only version of that song included, but the other four singles were presented as heard on their albums of origin instead of as the single edit or "radio edit" that the liner notes indicated.

== Track listing ==
=== Original 1983 version ===
Side one
No.	Title	Writer(s)	Length
1.	"Why Me?"	Irene Cara, Keith Forsey, Giorgio Moroder	4:38
2.	"Breakdance"	Cara, Bunny Hull, Moroder	3:26
3.	"You Took My Life Away"	Cara, Moroder	3:53
4.	"Receiving"	Seidman	3:42
5.	"Keep On"	Arthur Barrow, Cara, Forsey, Richie Zito	3:30

Side two
No.	Title	Writer(s)	Length
1.	"Flashdance... What a Feeling"	Cara, Forsey, Moroder	3:55
2.	"Romance '83"	Cara, Moroder	4:00
3.	"Cue Me Up"	Cara, Forsey, Moroder	3:25
4.	"Talk Too Much"	Cara, Forsey, Moroder	4:01
5.	"You Were Made for Me"	Eddie Brown, Cara	4:20

=== 1983 reissue #1 ===
The version of "The Dream" on this reissue is the same as the D.C. Cab soundtrack album version (running approximately 4:49).

Side one
No.	Title	Writer(s)	Length
1.	"Why Me?"	Cara, Forsey, Moroder	4:38
2.	"Breakdance"	Cara, Hull, Moroder	3:26
3.	"The Dream (Hold On to Your Dream)"	Pete Bellotte, Cara, Moroder	4:49
4.	"You Took My Life Away"	Cara, Moroder	3:53
5.	"Keep On"	Barrow, Cara, Forsey, Zito	3:30

Side two
No.	Title	Writer(s)	Length
1.	"Flashdance... What a Feeling"	Cara, Forsey, Moroder	3:55
2.	"Romance '83"	Cara, Moroder	4:00
3.	"Cue Me Up"	Cara, Forsey, Moroder	3:25
4.	"Receiving"	Seidman	3:42
5.	"You Were Made for Me"	Brown, Cara	4:20

=== 1983 reissue #2 ===
The version of "The Dream" on this reissue is the same as the 7-inch single version (running approximately 4:18).

Side one
No.	Title	Writer(s)	Length
1.	"Why Me?"	Cara, Forsey, Moroder	4:38
2.	"Breakdance"	Cara, Hull, Moroder	3:26
3.	"You Took My Life Away"	Cara, Moroder	3:53
4.	"Receiving"	William Seidman	3:42
5.	"Keep On"	Barrow, Cara, Forsey, Zito	3:30
6.	"The Dream (Hold On to Your Dream)"	Bellotte, Cara, Moroder	4:18

Side two
No.	Title	Writer(s)	Length
1.	"Flashdance... What a Feeling"	Cara, Forsey, Moroder	3:55
2.	"Romance '83"	Cara, Moroder	4:00
3.	"Cue Me Up"	Cara, Forsey, Moroder	3:25
4.	"Talk Too Much"	Cara, Forsey, Moroder	4:01
5.	"You Were Made for Me"	Brown, Cara	3:53

=== 1997 CD reissue ===
No.	Title	Length
1.	"Flashdance... What a Feeling" (mislabeled as Radio Edit)	3:57
2.	"Why Me?" (12" Mix)	7:03
3.	"Breakdance" (mislabeled as Radio Edit)	3:27
4.	"The Dream (Hold On to Your Dream)"	4:49
5.	"You Took My Life Away"	3:53
6.	"Keep On"	3:29
7.	"Romance '83"	3:56
8.	"Cue Me Up"	3:24
9.	"Receiving"	3:42
10.	"You Were Made for Me"	4:21
11.	"Talk Too Much"	4:01
12.	"Breakdance" (Extended Version)	5:26
13.	"The Dream (Hold On to Your Dream)" (Dance Remix)	6:49
14.	"Flashdance... What a Feeling" (Extended Version)	7:09
15.	"Flashdance... What a Feeling" (Instrumental)	8:03

== Personnel ==
From the liner notes for the 1997 CD release. Personnel for CD track 11 from the liner notes for the original 1983 vinyl release.

- Irene Cara – lead vocals

Additional vocalists

- Joe Esposito – background vocals (CD tracks 1, 2, 14, 15)
- Stephanie Spruill – background vocals (CD tracks 1, 2, 14, 15)
- Maxine Willard Waters – background vocals (CD tracks 1, 9, 14, 15)
- Merry Clayton – background vocals (CD track 2)
- Irene Cara – background vocals (CD tracks 3, 9, 12); additional background vocals (CD track 10)
- Bunny Hull – background vocals (CD tracks 3, 9, 12) ; additional background vocals (CD track 10)
- Giorgio Moroder – background vocals (CD tracks 3, 5, 12)
- Beth Anderson – background vocals (CD tracks 6, 8, 9)
- Mary Hylan – background vocals (CD tracks 6, 8)
- Joe Pizzulo – background vocals (CD tracks 6, 8); guest vocalist (CD track 8)
- Charlotte Crossley – background vocals (CD track 10)
- David Lasley – background vocals (CD track 10)
- Bruce Roberts – background vocals (CD track 10)
- Wendy McKenzie – additional background vocals (CD track 10)

Musicians

- Richie Zito – guitar (all CD tracks except 9, 10), Linn drums (all CD tracks except 1, 10, 14, 15), Simmons drums (CD tracks 3, 8, 11, 12), keyboards (CD tracks 3, 9, 12)
- Arthur Barrow – bass guitar (all CD tracks except 1, 9, 10, 14, 15 ), keyboards (all CD tracks except 1, 10, 14, 15)
- Keith Forsey – drums (CD tracks 1, 14, 15), percussion program (CD track 5)
- Sylvester Levay – keyboards (CD tracks 1, 5, 14, 15)
- Irene Cara – percussion program (CD track 6)
- Leo Adamian – percussion (CD track 9)
- Victoria Berdy – percussion (CD track 9)
- Joe Caro – guitar (CD track 9)
- Will Lee – bass guitar (CD track 9)
- Carol Steele – percussion (CD track 9)
- William Seidman – guitar (CD track 9)
- Mike Baird – drums (CD track 10)
- Lenny Castro – percussion (CD track 10)
- James Newton Howard – piano (CD track 10), synthesizer (CD track 10)
- Dean Parks – guitar (CD track 10)
- Neil Stubenhaus – bass (CD track 10)

Production

- Giorgio Moroder – producer (all CD tracks except 10)
- James Newton Howard – producer (CD track 10)
- Richie Zito – arranger (all CD tracks except 1, 14, 15)
- Sylvester Levay – arranger (CD tracks 1, 14, 15)
- William Seidman – co-arranger (CD track 9), co-engineer (CD track 9)
- John "Jellybean" Benitez – remixing (CD tracks 14, 15)
- Claude Allard – 1997 Unidisc CD digital remastering
- Brian Reeves – engineer (all CD tracks except 10)
- Mike Frondelli – engineer (all CD tracks except 10)
- Dave Concors – engineer (all CD tracks except 10)
- Elliot Scheiner – engineer (CD track 10)
- Rick Ruggieri – engineer (CD track 10)
- Jack Joseph Puig – mixing engineer (CD track 10)

All tracks except 1, 14, 15 mixed at Oasis Studios, Los Angeles. Tracks 1, 14, 15 mixed at Westlake Studios, Los Angeles. 1997 CD digitally remastered at Unidisc Studios, Montreal, Quebec.

Artwork

- Jeffrey Fey – design
- Harry Langdon – photography
- Chris Whorf – design

== Charts ==
Chart performance for What a Feelin'
Chart (1983–1984)	Peak position
Australian Albums (Kent Music Report)	49
Canada Top Albums/CDs (RPM)	83
Finnish Albums (Suomen virallinen lista)	17
German Albums (Offizielle Top 100)	29
Norwegian Albums (VG-lista)	12
Swedish Albums (Sverigetopplistan)	3
Swiss Albums (Schweizer Hitparade)	8
US Billboard 200	77
US Top R&B/Hip-Hop Albums (Billboard)	45
US Cash Box Albums	54

== Bibliography ==
- Guinn, Jeff; Perry, Douglas (2005), The Sixteenth Minute: Life in the Aftermath of Fame, Penguin Group, ISBN 1-58542-389-0
- Whitburn, Joel (2009), Joel Whitburn's Top Pop Singles, 1955-2008, Record Research Inc., ISBN 978-0898201802
- Whitburn, Joel (2010), Joel Whitburn Presents Top Pop Albums, Seventh Edition, Record Research Inc., ISBN 978-0-89820-183-3
- White, Adam (1990), The Billboard Book of Gold and Platinum Records, Billboard Publications, Inc., ISBN 0823075478
