= The Dream (Hold On to Your Dream) =

Single by Irene Cara

from the album What a Feelin' & D.C. Cab: Music from the Original Motion Picture Soundtrack
- B-side: "Receiving"; "You Took My Life Away"; "You Were Made for Me"
- Released: 1983
- Recorded: 1983
- Genre: Post-disco, synth-pop
- Length: 4:22 (single edit); 4:48 (album version); 6:48 (dance remix)
- Label: Geffen
- Songwriter(s): Pete Bellotte, Irene Cara, Giorgio Moroder
- Producer(s): Giorgio Moroder

Irene Cara singles chronology
"Why Me?" (1983)	"The Dream (Hold On to Your Dream)" (1983)	"Breakdance" (1984)

Audio video
- "Irene Cara - The Dream (Hold On To Your Dream) - What A Feelin'" on YouTube

"The Dream (Hold On to Your Dream)" is a song written by Giorgio Moroder, Pete Bellotte, and the song's performer, Irene Cara, for the 1983 film D.C. Cab. Although not included on initial pressings of Cara's What a Feelin' LP, the decision to release the film four months earlier than originally slated prompted an arrangement for her album to be reissued with the song. A slightly different version (more noticeable in the intro) was also included on the film's soundtrack album; an edited version was released on the 7-inch single, and the 12-inch single included a much longer dance remix.

Critics compared the song with her most recent soundtrack contribution, "Flashdance... What a Feeling" from the 1983 film Flashdance, but Cara was credited with presenting a different vocal side in the new track in which she sang about the difficulties encountered before reaching her goal and the fact that she stayed committed to her belief in what she wanted to achieve.

"The Dream" reached number 37 on the Billboard Hot 100 in 1984. The music video was broadcast on MTV and interspersed clips from the film with scenes of Cara performing the song in various London locales.

== Background ==
In March 1983, Casablanca Records released the first single from the soundtrack to the upcoming Paramount Pictures film Flashdance, the story of Alex Owens (Jennifer Beals), a young woman who works as a welder and nightclub performer and dreams of becoming a ballerina. The music for that song, "Flashdance... What a Feeling", was written by the composer of the score for the film, Giorgio Moroder, and Irene Cara, who performed the song, wrote the lyrics with Keith Forsey. Their collaboration spent six weeks at number one on the Billboard Hot 100, and Moroder and Cara together completed two more projects in 1983 that were initially separate: Cara's next album, What a Feelin', and a song for the soundtrack of the film D.C. Cab titled "The Dream (Hold On to Your Dream)". Moroder also composed the score for that film and produced the soundtrack album. He wrote the music for the song, and Cara again sang and co-wrote the lyrics. She also made a cameo appearance in the film as herself.

D.C. Cab told the story of a taxi service in the nation's capital. The film's producer, Topper Carew, who is also credited for its story and screenplay, explained the connection between Cara's song and the characters he created: "The story is basically about a bunch of guys who really don't have it together and how by the film's end they turn themselves around. That's the dream." Samson, one of the underdog cabbies was played by Mr. T., whose new television show The A-Team was a top ten hit in the Nielsen ratings, and the film's distributor, Universal Pictures, wanted to take advantage of his popularity by moving the film's release up from the April 1984 slot that had been planned to December 16, 1983. The loss of those four months that had been available for publicizing the film disrupted the plans that the studio had to market it using members of the cast. The movie opened in ninth place in its first weekend of release and earned a total of $16 million over the course of its theatrical run.

== Release ==
The release of the soundtrack album, which had been slated for February 1984 by MCA Records and included "The Dream", was also now moved up to December. Cara's own What a Feelin' album had been released by Geffen Records on November 2, 1983, without the new soundtrack single, but one of the film's executive producers, Jon Peters, arranged to have her album pulled from store shelves and reissued to include it.

The review of the song in Cash Box magazine pointed out that her previous single, "Why Me?", was "still making its way up the charts." The December 10 issues of that magazine and Billboard both included the debut of "The Dream" on their respective lists of the 100 most popular singles in the US and listed "Why Me?" with bullets indicating noteworthy airplay and sales gains, giving her two songs moving up the charts at the same time.

"The Dream" had a chart run of 14 weeks on the Billboard Hot 100, during which time it peaked at number 37. The December 24 Billboard issue marked its debut on the magazine's Black Singles chart, where it got as high as number 65 over the course of eight weeks. That issue also reported that the music video for the song debuted on the "MTV Adds & Rotation" list, which noted that it was added to the cable channel's playlist of music videos as of December 14. The song also reached number 26 during an eight-week run on the Dance/Disco Top 80 chart in Billboard, which did not begin until the January 28, 1984, issue.

== Critical reception ==
Cash Box magazine compared the song to Cara's previous soundtrack excursion, stating that it "begins dream-like and builds to an energetic race in the 'Flashdance... What a Feeling' mold." However, they added that "Cara showcases a different vocal side here, and with aggressive guitar backdrop the side stands on its own."

Upon recognizing the day in history on which Cara reached number one in the US with "Flashdance... What a Feeling", the editors at History.com noted, "Unfortunately for Cara, her next soundtrack hit... would not have nearly the same cultural impact."

== Music video ==
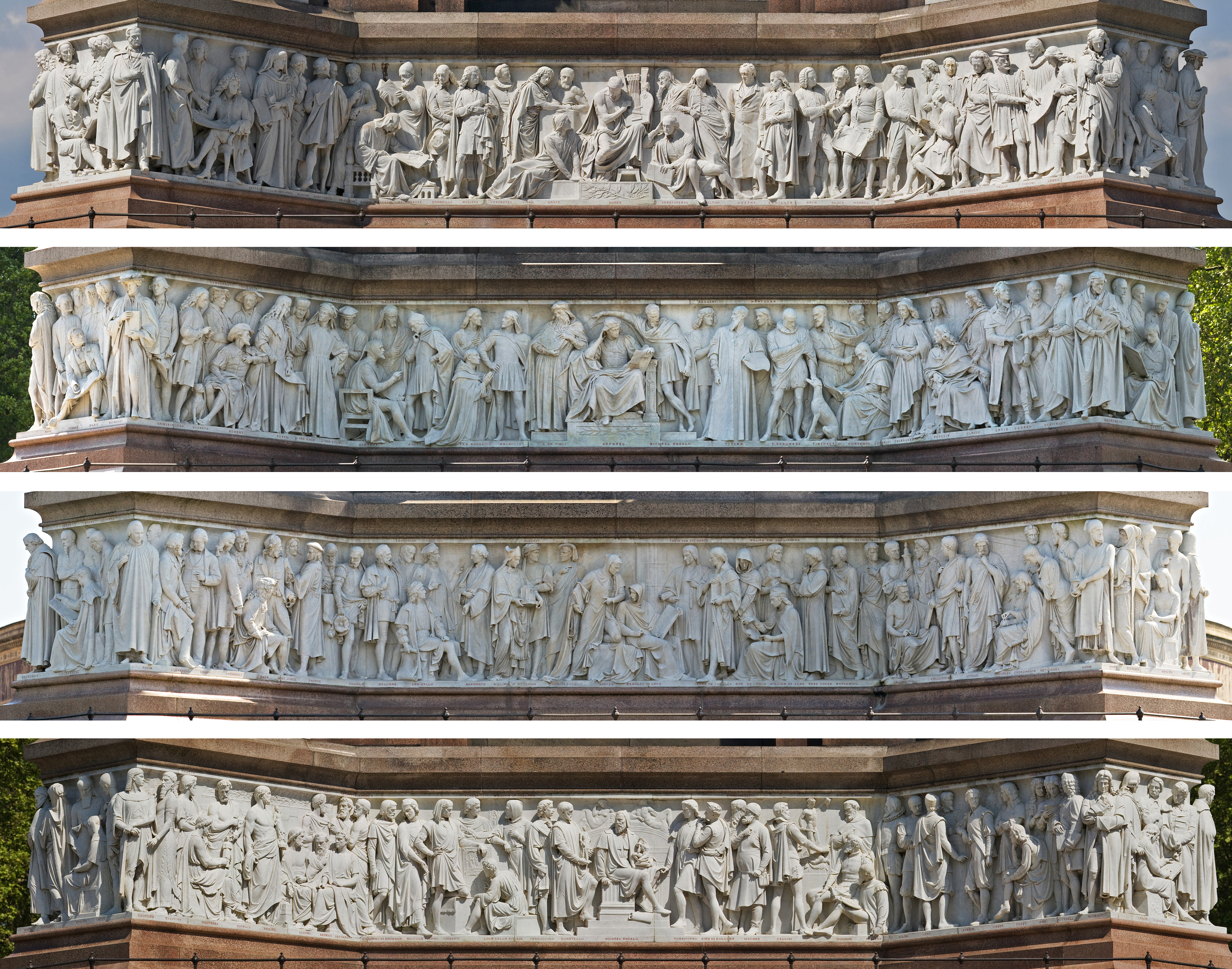
The Frieze of Parnassus, which provides a backdrop in the video.

The promotional clip for the song featured Cara doing some lip-syncing and dancing along against two different backdrops: one inside her home after receiving a note that reads, "We miss you, Irene! Your friends at D.C. Cab", and the other on the streets of London with hackney carriages and historical landmarks balancing out the slapstick scenes from the film that appear throughout the video. For example, a scene from the film in which two of the drivers Albert Hockenberry (Adam Baldwin) and Tyrone Bywater (Charlie Barnett) try frantically to exit a cab that has stalled on railroad tracks as a train approaches is sandwiched between shots of Cara singing and dancing in front of the Frieze of Parnassus at the Albert Memorial.

As with the video for her previous single, "Why Me?", the video for the D.C. Cab song was directed and edited by Doug Dowdle and produced by Jeffrey Abelson, a then up-and-coming movie studios liaison for music television shows and record companies. His arranging of the shoot for the video for this song was helpful in establishing his role as go-between. Cara was in production on a film in Europe, and he assured Universal Pictures that he would get Cara to appear in the music video. He told Billboard magazine, "I flew over there, set everything up and lensed her in less than a day." Since Cara was living in New York City some months later when Abelson was in town shooting the video for the Ray Parker Jr. single "Ghostbusters", she agreed to be included as one of a dozen celebrities providing individual cameos in which they shouted the film song's name into the camera.

== Track listing and formats ==
- US 7" single
1. "The Dream (Hold On to Your Dream)" – 4:22
2. "Receiving" – 3:41
- US 12" single
1. " The Dream (Hold On to Your Dream)" (Dance Remix) – 6:48
2. " The Dream (Hold On to Your Dream)" (Single Edit) – 4:22
- Brazil 7" single
1. "The Dream (Hold On to Your Dream)" – 4:18
2. "You Took My Life Away" – 3:53
- Philippines 7" single
1. "The Dream (Hold On to Your Dream)" – 4:48
2. "You Were Made for Me" – 4:20
- UK 12" single
1. " The Dream (Hold On to Your Dream)" (Dance Remix) – 6:48
2. "Receiving" – 3:41

== Credits and personnel ==
- Irene Cara – vocals, lyrics
- Giorgio Moroder - composer, producer
- Pete Bellotte - lyrics
- Arthur Barrow - bass guitar, keyboards
- Richie Zito - guitar, Linn drums, arranger

== Charts ==
Chart (1984)	Peak position
Australia (Kent Music Report)	84
US Billboard Hot 100	37
US Billboard Dance/Disco Top 80	26
US Billboard R&B Singles	65
US Cash Box Top 100	38

== Bibliography ==
- Whitburn, Joel (2004a), Joel Whitburn Presents Top R&B/Hip-Hop Singles, 1942-2004, Record Research Inc., ISBN 0898201608
- Whitburn, Joel (2004b), Joel Whitburn's Hot Dance/Disco, 1974-2003, Record Research Inc., ISBN 089820156X
- Whitburn, Joel (2009), Joel Whitburn's Top Pop Singles, 1955-2008, Record Research Inc., ISBN 978-0898201802
- White, Adam (1990), The Billboard Book of Gold and Platinum Records, Billboard Publications, Inc., ISBN 0823075478
