= Karen Kamon =

American singer and actress (1951–2020)

- Also known as: Karen Ichiuji-Ramone
- Born: Karen Ichiuji; May 15, 1951; United States
- Died: March 25, 2020 (aged 68) United States

Karen Ichiuji-Ramone (née Ichiuji; May 15, 1951 – March 25, 2020), known by her stage name Karen Kamon, was an American singer and actress.

She is perhaps best known for her performance of "Manhunt" on the soundtrack to the movie Flashdance. In 1984, her recording of "Loverboy" reached #88 on the Billboard Hot 100. She also sang "Squeeze Play" on the soundtrack to the movie D.C. Cab and provided additional voices for the movie Oliver & Company.

In television, she appeared in one episode of the U.S. TV series T.J. Hooker.

She is listed as a production associate on Karen Carpenter's solo album and credited, on the Carpenters' compilation album Lovelines, as a friend of Karen Carpenter. She was also interviewed for the installment of VH1's series Behind the Music that dealt with "The Carpenters" and appeared in a segment in the VH1 documentary 100 Most Shocking Moments in Rock and Roll History.

== Personal life ==
Karen Ichiuji-Ramone first met music producer Phil Ramone while working as a tour publicist for Peter, Paul and Mary in 1977. Ramone produced the first of two albums in her known discography, Heart of You, in 1984. She was married to him from 1984 until his death in 2013 at the age of 79. They had three children, including Matthew Ramone, general manager of Phil Ramone Incorporated.

On March 25, 2020, it was reported that Ichiuji-Ramone had died.

== Discography ==
=== Albums ===
- 1984: Heart of You – Label: CBS-26017 – included the single "Loverboy," which reached #88 on the Billboard Hot 100 chart
- 1987: Voices – Label: ATCO-90575 (including a cover version of the Russ Ballard classic "Voices")

=== Soundtracks ===
- 1983: D.C. Cab: Music from the Original Motion Picture Soundtrack
- 1983: Flashdance: Original Soundtrack from the Motion Picture
