= You Were Made for Me =

You Were Made for Me may refer to:

- "You Were Made for Me" (Sam Cooke song), 1958
- "You Were Made for Me" (Freddie and the Dreamers song), 1963
- "You Were Made for Me" (Irene Cara song), 1984
