= Bunny Hull =

American songwriter

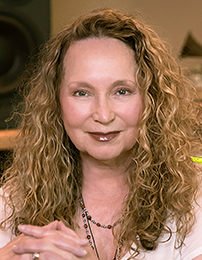
- Hull in 2017

Background information
- Born: Jeri Keever Hull; October 9, 1951 (age 74); New Orleans, Louisiana, United States.
- Genres: Rock; pop; dance-rock; R&B; gospel; disco; country; synthpop
- Occupations: Songwriter; Musician; Composer; Vocalist; Lyricist; Producer; Audio Engineer; Film Director; Author; Humanitarian
- Instruments: Vocals; Keyboards; Percussion; Ukulele
- Years active: 1975–present
- Labels: Chrysalis; Curb Records; Epic; Geffen Records; MCA; Pony Canyon; Reprise; Sony Music; Warner Records
- Website: bunnyhull.com

Jeri Keever "Bunny" Hull (born October 9, 1951) is an American songwriter, musician, and author. Her catalog includes music, film and television projects. She is a recipient of 20 Gold and Platinum Certifications, a Grammy Award and two nominations, an Emmy nomination, a GMA Dove Award, a BMI Performance Award, and multiple Parents' Choice Awards. In 2021, Hull was inducted into the Women Songwriters Hall of Fame.

== Early life ==
Hull studied piano, dance, and trained as a pianist from the age of 7 with Muriel Adler and Hal Stesch. She trained as a dancer with Christina Carson of Sadler Wells Ballet and began writing music at age 15 in Las Vegas. Hull performed in Las Vegas stage shows with Gene Kelly, Jimmy Durante, Sergio Franchi, and Dick Jensen.

Her first professional recordings as a vocalist were on Mason's 1979 Groovin’ You album, and a duet written and sung with violinist, orchestra leader, multi-instrumentalist and singer, Charles Veal Jr.

Hull's work as a songwriter and backing vocalist gained momentum during this period, including tours to Japan with Christopher Cross and the East Coast with Boz Scaggs.

== Music career ==
Hull has worked with a broad range of top-tier recording artists in different genres, including Anita Baker, Angela Bofill, Peabo Bryson, Christopher Cross, George Duke, Michael Franks, Thelma Houston, Billy Idol, Michael Jackson, The Judds, Wynonna Judd, KC & the Sunshine Band, B.B. King, Patti LaBelle, Ricky Martin, Diana Ross, Donna Summer, Bob Welch, Quincy Jones, and Vanessa Williams.

The song Breakdance was co-written by Hull with Giorgio Moroder and Irene Cara in 1983 for Cara's What a Feelin' album. It was released as a single and reached No. 8 on the Billboard pop chart, No. 13 on the US dance chart, and No. 23 on the US R&B chart in 1984.

Hull co-wrote the Patti Labelle song New Attitude with Sharon Robinson and Jon Gilutin in 1984. The song was included on the soundtrack for the 1984 Paramount film Beverly Hills Cop. It won a Grammy Award for Best Album Of Original Score Written for a Motion Picture Or Television Special at the 28th Annual Grammy Awards. A cover version of the song, produced by Peter Bunetta and Rick Chudakoff, was released as a single by Patti LaBelle in December 1984 and nominated for a Grammy Award for Best Female R&B Vocal Performance in 1986.

In 1992, the song, Ready for a Miracle, was composed by Hull and Art Reynolds, was originally recorded by Patti LaBelle and Edwin Hawkins for the Leap of Faith film soundtrack and recorded by LeAnn Rimes for the 2007 Evan Almighty film soundtrack. Rimes' version of the song won a GMA Dove Award at the 39th Annual Dove Awards for Traditional Gospel Recorded Song of the Year in 2008.

In 1995, Hull composed and arranged music with Brenda Russell for the song Let Somebody Know on Diana Ross' Take Me Higher album. She also contributed keyboard programming, keyboards, vocal arrangement, and backing vocals.

=== Additional music credits ===
Partial list:

- Backing vocals on Michael Jackson's 1982 Thriller album and his 1995 HIStory: Past, Present and Future, Book I album
- Backing vocals on Anita Baker's 1986 Rapture album
- Backing vocals on Karyn White's 1988 self-titled debut album
- Backing vocals on Patti LaBelle's 1989 single If You Asked Me To from her Be Yourself studio album
- Backing vocals on Michael Franks' 1990 Blue Pacific album
- Backing vocals on Billy Idol's 1990 Charmed Life album
- Primary Artist, producer, engineer, arranger, Mixing, Vocals, Programming, composer, Lyricist on the 2007 Dream A World album, Young Masters Little Wisdom: Secrets Of The Heart

=== Solo projects ===
Truth and Tenderness, an album of 10 original songs by Hull, was released on vinyl LP through the Sampony record label in South Korea on November 12, 1991. It includes backing vocals by Thelma Houston and Lebo M and synth by Simon Franglen. The album was released on CD through the Pony Canyon record label (aka P.C.H, or Pacific Coast Highway) the same year.

=== Children's books and CD's ===
Hull is the founder of the publishing imprint Young Masters Little Wisdom in 2009. Its Dream A World website include hardbound books, Kids Creative Classics activity kits illustrated by Synthia Saint James, and Young Masters Little Wisdom books illustrated by Kye Fleming. The series is designed for students from 3 to 6 years of age and is a foundation for curriculum development currently used in public schools, private schools, and Montessori Schools.

Young Masters Little Wisdom: Secrets Of The Heart is part of the series and is a recipient of the 2008 Parents’ Choice Recommended Award.

== Film and television ==
Hull's film credits include:

- Staying Alive (1983 film)
- Co-writer of the song New Attitude from Beverly Hills Cop (1984 film)
- Licence to Kill (1989 film)
- City Slickers (1991 film)
- Thelma & Louise (1991 film)
- Co-writer with Art Reynolds for the song Ready for a Miracle on the Leap of Faith soundtrack (1992 film)
- The Prince of Egypt (1998 animated film)
- Bruce Almighty (2003 film)
- Miss Congeniality 2: Armed and Fabulous (2005 film)
- Co-writer of the song Ready for a Miracle from Evan Almighty: Music from and Inspired by the Motion Picture (2007 film)

Her television credits include work for NBC, PBS, ABC, CBS, cable networks and programs such as The Today Show, The Nanny, The Oprah Winfrey Show, Charmed, Sesame Street, and The Simpsons.

=== Documentary Film: The Ripple Effect ===
Hull directed a documentary short film about Dream A World Education's mission in 2017, entitled The Ripple Effect, the film was co-produced with Cinema Verde Productions, Inc. in 2018. It won a Global Impact Film Festival award for Best Sound Design that year and was nominated for an Emmy Award in the Independent Programming category of the 71st Los Angeles Area Emmy Awards in July 2019.

== Awards and nominations ==
- Grammy Award: Best Album of Original Score Written for a Motion Picture or Television Special. Song: New Attitude. Bunny Hull, songwriter. Film: Beverly Hills Cop – 1984
- Grammy Nomination: Best Female R&B Vocal Performance New Attitude – 1986
- GMA Dove Award: Traditional Recorded Gospel Song of the Year. Song: Ready For A Miracle – 2007
- Emmy Nomination: Independent Programming category in the 71st Los Angeles Area Emmy Awards. Film: The Ripple Effect – 2019
- Induction into Women Songwriter’s Hall of Fame: Roberta Flack, Valerie Simpson, Bunny Hull, Mary Chapin Carpenter, Deniece Williams, Tawatha Agee, Klymaxx, and The Go-Go's’’ - 2021
