= Anyone Can See =

Studio album by Irene Cara
- Released: January 1982
- Studios: A&R Recording, Mediasound Studios and The Power Station (New York City, New York)
- Genre: R&B
- Length: 39:17
- Label: Network
- Producer: Ron Dante

Irene Cara chronology
Ésta es Irene (1967)	Anyone Can See (1982)	What a Feelin' (1983)

Singles from Anyone Can See
- 1. "Anyone Can See"/"Why" Released: November 1981; 2. "My Baby (He's Something Else)"/"Slow Down" Released: April 1982

Professional ratings
Review scores
Source	Rating
AllMusic	3/5 stars

Anyone Can See is Irene Cara's debut album as an adult artist, released in 1982. This album followed up her successful hit singles "Out Here on My Own" and "Fame". The album is solid R&B featuring such standout songs as "Reach Out I'll Be There", "Slow Down" and the power ballad title track among others. Includes the hit, "Anyone Can See" which peaked at #42 on the Billboard Hot 100 chart. It was produced by The Archies' Ron Dante.

== Critical reviews ==
Professional ratings
Review scores
Source	Rating
AllMusic	3.5/5 stars

In their review, Billboard stated that "Cara shows her vocal versatility on such uptempo tracks as the remake of "Reach Out, I'll Be There," "Wha'd Ya Want" and achieves a poignancy on "Anyone Can See." Cara has surrounded herself with a cast of top players with the end result an impressive new chapter in her young career."

Cash Box noted that "she has a young energetic vocal style that comes across as more heartfelt on ballads than on uptempo numbers like the title track. Luckily she's found a producer, Ron Dante, who can direct lush Manilow-like ballads, as well as more uptempo synth/dance numbers. A searing remake of the Motown classic "Reach Out, I'll Be There" and the poppy "Wha'd Ya Want" are other highlights of this excellent debut for Network."

AllMusic rated the album three stars, complementing the "strong R&B repertoire, reputable backing musicians, and solid production" on the record. "Her distinctive combination of subtlety and strength...is something of a cross between the raspy tones of Bonnie Tyler and the sensitivity of Deniece Williams. A solid listen throughout, Anyone Can See is Cara in her prime.

== Track listing ==
1. "Reach Out I'll Be There" (Holland–Dozier–Holland) – 4:27
2. "My Baby (He's Something Else)" (Cara, Gordon Grody, Carlotta McKee) – 3:33
3. "Anyone Can See" (Cara, Bruce Roberts) – 3:42
4. "Don't Throw Your Love Away" (Cara, Gail Boggs, Josh Shneider) – 3:58
5. "Slow Down" (Cara) – 3:53
6. "Whad'ya Want" (Cara, Grody, McKee) – 3:35
7. "You Hurt Me Once" (Alan Roy Scott, Ed Fox) – 3:39
8. "Thunder in My Heart" (Leo Sayer, Tom Snow) – 3:39
9. "Why" (Andy Goldmark, Jim Ryan) – 4:49
10. "True Love" (Bill Seidman) – 3:46
- "Fame" was included on the UK edition as track 6.

== Personnel ==
- Irene Cara – vocals, acoustic piano, arrangements
- Hiram Bullock – clavinet, guitars
- Gordon Grody – acoustic piano, synthesizers, guitars, backing vocals
- Don Grolnick – clavinet
- Leon Pendarvis – acoustic piano, synthesizers, arrangements
- Steve Robbins – acoustic piano
- Paul Shaffer – acoustic piano, Fender Rhodes, clavinet
- Ed Walsh – synthesizers
- Harold Wheeler – acoustic piano, arrangements
- Joe Caro – guitars
- John Tropea – guitars
- Hugh McCracken – guitars, arrangements
- Jeff Mironov – guitars
- Jimmy Ripp – guitars
- Bill Seidman – guitars, arrangements
- Francisco Centeno – bass
- Will Lee – bass
- John Siegler – bass
- Leo Adamian – drums
- Yogi Horton – drums
- Andy Newmark – drums
- Chris Parker – drums
- Ronnie Zito – drums
- Michael Carabello – congas, percussion
- Jimmy Maelen – congas, percussion
- Tawatha Agee – backing vocals
- Phillip Ballou – backing vocals
- Gail Boggs – backing vocals
- Robin Clark – backing vocals
- Ron Dante – backing vocals
- Chrissy Faith – backing vocals
- Babi Floyd – backing vocals
- Frank Floyd – backing vocals
- Bruce Roberts – backing vocals
- Joshua Shneider – backing vocals
- Annie Sutton – backing vocals
- Luther Vandross – backing vocals

=== Production ===
- Ron Dante – producer
- Geoff Howe – chief engineer
- Bernie Grundman – mastering at A&M Studios (Hollywood, California)
- Ron Coro – art direction
- Stan Evenson – design
- Harry Langdon – photography
- Selma Rubin – management

== Charts ==
Chart (1983)	Peak position
Dutch Albums (Album Top 100)	48
US Billboard 200	76
US R&B Albums (Billboard)	39
US Cash Box Charts	80
