= Irene Cara =

American singer and actress (1959–2022)

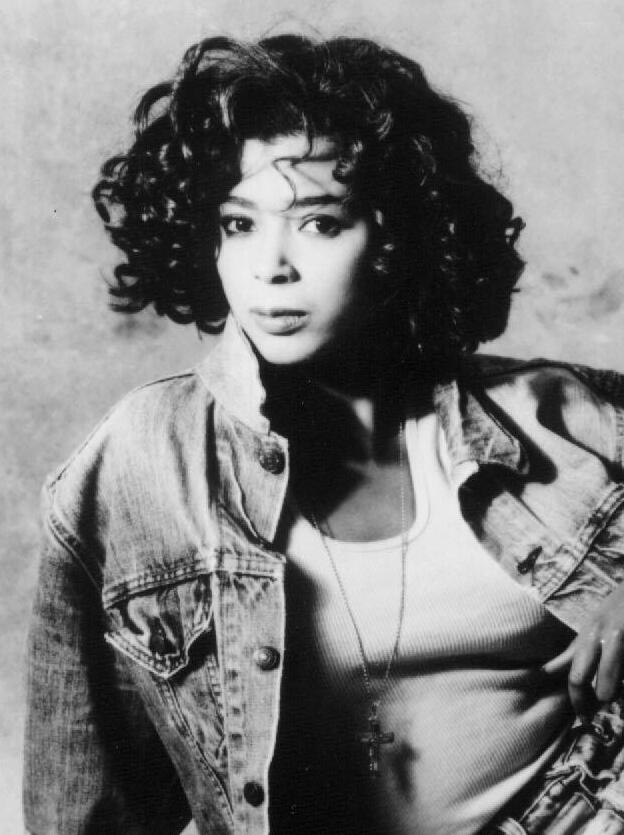
- Cara in 1987
- Born: Irene Cruz Escalera; March 18, 1959; New York City, U.S.
- Died: November 25, 2022 (aged 63); Largo, Florida, U.S.
- Occupations: Singer; actress
- Years active: 1967–2011
- Known for: Sparkle Williams – Sparkle; Coco Hernandez – Fame
- Spouse: Conrad Palmisano (m. 1986; div. 1991)
- Musical career
- Genres: R&B; pop; disco
- Instruments: Vocals
- Labels: RSO; Network; Epic; Geffen; Elektra
- Website: irenecara.com

Irene Cruz Escalera (March 18, 1959 (Note: Cara's year of birth is disputed. The majority of sources claim 1959, one claims 1962, and Cara herself implied she was born in 1961 by claiming she turned 59 years old via a 2020 tweet, despite stating she was 24 in a 1983 interview with Dick Clark on American Bandstand (which would indicate a birth year of 1959). As of May 22, 2021, a year after her tweet, her Twitter profile says that she was born a year later in 1962. Her mother told The New York Times in 1970 that a young Ms. Cara was 11 years old (which would also indicate a birth year of 1959).) – November 25, 2022), known professionally as Irene Cara, was an American singer and actress who rose to prominence for her role as Coco Hernandez in the 1980 musical film Fame, and for recording the film's title song "Fame", which reached No. 1 in several countries. In 1983, Cara co-wrote and sang the song "Flashdance... What a Feeling" (from the film Flashdance), for which she shared an Academy Award for Best Original Song and won a Grammy Award for Best Female Pop Vocal Performance in 1984.

Before her success with Fame, Cara portrayed the title character Sparkle Williams in the original 1976 musical drama film Sparkle. Cara died as a result of hypertensive heart disease after hypercholesterolemia at age 63.

== Early life ==
Irene Cruz Escalera was born and raised in the Bronx, New York City, the youngest of five children. Her father, Gaspar Escalera, a steel factory worker and retired saxophonist, was Puerto Rican, and her mother, Louise Escalera, a movie theater usher, was Cuban. Cara had two sisters and two brothers. She began taking dance lessons when she was five. Her performing career started with her singing and dancing professionally on Spanish-language television. She made early TV appearances on The Original Amateur Hour (singing in Spanish) and Johnny Carson's The Tonight Show.

In 1971, she was a regular on PBS's educational program The Electric Company as a member of the Short Circus, the show's band, appearing as a member during the show’s first season. As a child, Cara recorded a Spanish-language record for the Latin market and an English-language Christmas album. She also appeared in a major concert tribute to Duke Ellington, which featured Stevie Wonder, Sammy Davis Jr., and Roberta Flack. Cara attended the Professional Children's School in Manhattan. In 1985, Cara told Cosmopolitan "I don't mean to sound immodest, but I'd never had any doubt that I'd be successful, nor any fear of success; I was raised as a little goddess who was told she would be a star."

== Career ==
Cara appeared in Broadway and off-Broadway shows, starting with Maggie Flynn opposite Shirley Jones and Jack Cassidy. Shortly thereafter, she was one of five finalists for the "Little Miss America" pageant. She also appeared in Via Galactica with Raúl Juliá, Ain't Misbehavin' and The Me Nobody Knows (which won an Obie Award). Cara was the original Daisy Allen on the 1970s daytime serial Love of Life. She later took on the role of Angela in the romance/thriller Aaron Loves Angela, followed by her portrayal of the title character in Sparkle.

Television brought Cara international acclaim for serious dramatic roles in Roots: The Next Generations and Guyana Tragedy: The Story of Jim Jones. John Willis' Screen World, Vol. 28, named her one of twelve "Promising New Actors of 1976"; that same year, a readers' poll in Right On! magazine named her Top Actress.

[Gail] Boggs describes Cara as a "perfectionist" who works on a song until absolutely satisfied with it.

— Ebony

The 1980 hit film Fame, directed by Alan Parker, catapulted Cara to stardom. She originally was cast as a dancer, but when producers David Da Silva and Alan Marshall and screenwriter Christopher Gore heard her voice, they re-wrote the role of Coco Hernandez for her to play. In this part, she sang both the title song "Fame" and the single "Out Here on My Own", which were both nominated for the Academy Award for Best Original Song. These songs helped make the film's soundtrack a chart-topping, multi-platinum album, and it was the first time that two songs from the same film and sung by the same artist were nominated in the same category. Cara had the opportunity to be one of the few singers to perform more than one song at the Oscar ceremony; "Fame", written by Michael Gore and Dean Pitchford, won the award for best original song that year, and the film won the Academy Award for Best Original Score. Cara earned Grammy Award nominations in 1980 for Best New Artist and Best Female Pop Vocal Performance, as well as a Golden Globe nomination for Best Motion Picture Actress in a Musical. Billboard named her Top New Single Artist, and Cashbox magazine awarded her both Most Promising Female Vocalist and Top Female Vocalist. Asked by Fame TV series producers to reprise her role as Coco Hernandez, she declined, wanting to focus her attention on her recording career; Erica Gimpel assumed the role.

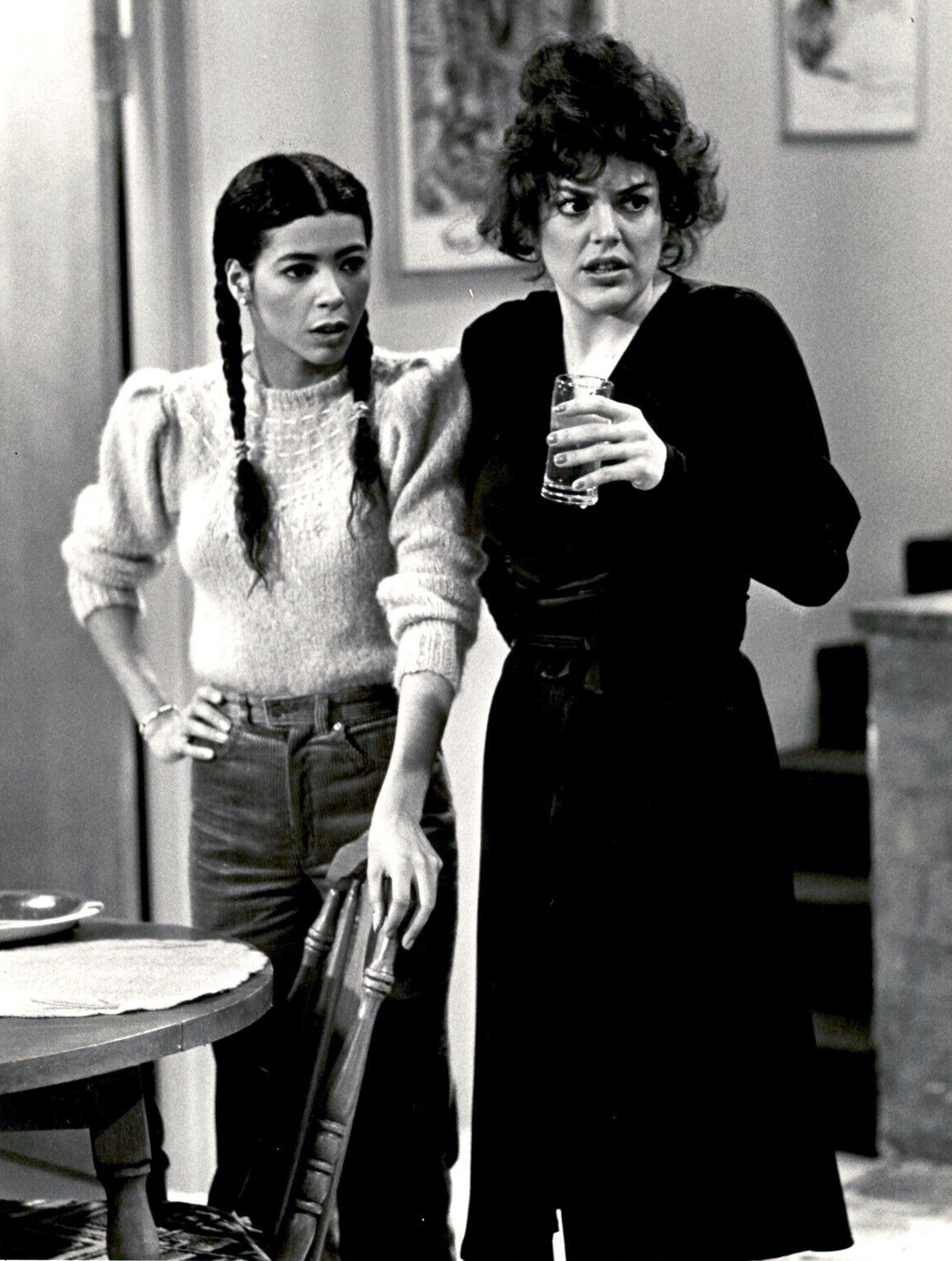
Cara with Dee Dee Rescher in the pilot of Irene, 1981

In 1980, she briefly played the role of Dorothy in The Wiz on tour, in a role that Stephanie Mills had portrayed in the original Broadway production. Coincidentally, Cara and Mills had shared the stage together as children in the original 1968 Broadway musical Maggie Flynn, starring Shirley Jones and Jack Cassidy, in which both young girls played American Civil War orphans.

NBC kept Cara under contract and asked her to appear with record producer turned TV personality Mitch Miller for a primetime TV special. Network chief Fred Silverman wanted to commemorate the 20th anniversary of Miller's famous Sing Along with Mitch musical hours, with the possibility of turning the special into a series. Miller reunited many members of his 1961 gang, including a dozen singers and many behind-the-scenes crew members, and taped the special in New York. Irene Cara had two specialty numbers: a vocal of "Out Here on My Own" and a song-and-dance number alongside choreographer Victor Griffin. The show aired in January 1981, and while it was a faithful re-creation of the 1960s program, it did not get picked up as a series.

Cara was set to star in the sitcom Irene in 1981. The cast had veteran performers Kaye Ballard and Teddy Wilson as well as newcomers Julia Duffy and Keenen Ivory Wayans. However, the pilot was not picked up by the network for the fall season. In 1982, Cara earned the Image Award for Best Actress when she co-starred with Diahann Carroll and Rosalind Cash in the NBC Movie of the Week Sister, Sister. Cara portrayed Myrlie Evers-Williams in For Us the Living: The Medgar Evers Story, the PBS TV movie about civil rights leader Medgar Evers, and she earned an NAACP Image Award Best Actress nomination. She also appeared in 1982's Killing 'em Softly. Cara continued to perform in live theater.

In 1983, Cara appeared as herself in the film D.C. Cab. One of the characters, Tyrone, played by Charlie Barnett, is an obsessed Cara fan who decorated his Checker Cab as a shrine to her. "The Dream (Hold On to Your Dream)", her contribution to the film's soundtrack, played over the closing credits of the film, and was a minor hit, peaking at No. 37 on the Billboard Hot 100 in February 1984.

Cara reached the peak of her music career in 1983 with the title song for the movie Flashdance: "Flashdance... What a Feeling", which she co-wrote with Giorgio Moroder and Keith Forsey. Cara wrote the lyrics to the song with Keith Forsey while riding in a car in New York heading to the studio to record it; Moroder composed the music. Cara admitted later that she was initially reluctant to work with Giorgio Moroder because she had no wish to invite comparisons with Donna Summer, another artist who worked with Moroder. The song became a hit in several countries, attracting several awards for Cara. She shared the 1983 Academy Award for Best Original Song with Moroder and Forsey, becoming the first black woman to win an Oscar in a non-acting category and the youngest to receive an Oscar for songwriting. She won the 1984 Grammy Award for Best Female Pop Vocal Performance, 1984 Golden Globe Award for Best Original Song, and American Music Awards for Best R&B Female Artist and Best Pop Single of the Year.

In 1984, she was in the comedic thriller City Heat, co-starring with Clint Eastwood and Burt Reynolds and singing the standards "Embraceable You" and "Get Happy". She also co-wrote the theme song "City Heat", sung by the jazz vocalist Joe Williams. In May 1984, she scored her final Top 40 hit with "Breakdance" going to No. 8. "You Were Made for Me" reached No. 78 that summer, but she did not appear on the Hot 100 again. In 1985, Cara co-starred with Tatum O'Neal in Certain Fury. In 1986, Cara appeared in the film Busted Up. She also provided the voice of Snow White in the unofficial sequel to Disney's Snow White and the Seven Dwarfs, Filmation's Happily Ever After, in 1993. The same year, she appeared as Mary Magdalene in a tour of Jesus Christ Superstar with Ted Neeley, Carl Anderson, and Dennis DeYoung.

Cara released three studio albums: Anyone Can See in 1982, What a Feelin' in 1983, and Carasmatic in 1987, the most successful of these being What a Feelin'. In 1985, she collaborated with the Hispanic charity supergroup Hermanos in the song "Cantaré, cantarás", in which she sang a solo segment with the Spanish opera singer Plácido Domingo. Cara toured Europe and Asia throughout the 1990s, achieving several modest dance hits on European charts, but no U.S. chart hits. She released a compilation of Eurodance singles in the mid-to-late 1990s titled Precarious 90's. Cara also worked as a backup vocalist for Vicki Sue Robinson, Lou Reed, George Duke, Oleta Adams, and Evelyn "Champagne" King.

In 1993, a California jury awarded her $1.5 million from a 1985 lawsuit she filed against record executive Al Coury and Network Records, accusing them of withholding royalties from the Flashdance soundtrack and her first two solo records. Cara stated that, as a result, she was labeled as being difficult to work with and that the music industry "virtually blacklisted" her.

In 2005, Cara won the third round of the NBC television series Hit Me, Baby, One More Time, performing "Flashdance... What a Feeling" and covered Anastacia's song "I'm Outta Love" with her all-female band Hot Caramel. At the 2006 AFL Grand Final in Melbourne, Cara performed a rendition of "Flashdance" as an opener to the pre-match entertainment.

In 2005, Cara contributed a dance single, titled "Forever My Love", to the compilation album titled Gay Happening Vol. 12.

Cara was in Hot Caramel, a band which she formed in 1999. Their album, called Irene Cara Presents Hot Caramel, was released in 2011. Cara appeared in season 2 of CMT's reality show Gone Country.

== Personal life and death ==
Cara married stuntman and film director Conrad Palmisano in Los Angeles on April 13, 1986. Palmisano had accompanied Cara to a state dinner held at the White House in honor of president Raúl Alfonsín of Argentina on March 19, 1985. The couple had no children and divorced in 1991.

Cara died from arteriosclerosis and hypertensive heart disease at her home on November 25, 2022, at 63 years of age; she also had diabetes. At the time of her death, Cara was a resident of Florida, living in Largo and maintaining a secondary address in New Port Richey, where her company, Caramel Productions, was located.

== Discography ==
=== Studio albums ===
Year	Album	Peak chart positions					Record label
Year	Album	US	US R&B	AUS	CAN	NLD	Record label
1967	Ésta es Irene	—	—	—	—	—	Gema Records
1982	Anyone Can See	76	39	—	—	48	Network
1983	What a Feelin'	77	45	49	83	—	Network/Geffen
1987	Carasmatic	—	—	—	—	—	Elektra
2011	Irene Cara Presents Hot Caramel	—	—	—	—	—	CPM
"—" denotes a recording that did not chart or was not released in that territory.

=== Singles ===
Year	Single	Peak chart positions										Certifications	Album
Year	Single	US	AUS	CAN	GER	IRE	NLD	NZ	SWE	SWI	UK	Certifications	Album
1980	"Fame"	4	3	42	—	1	1	1	3	—	1	MC: Gold; BPI: Gold; NVPI: Gold	Fame
1980	"Hot Lunch Jam"	—	—	—	—	—	—	—	—	—	—		Fame
1980	"Out Here on My Own"	19	41	—	—	—	—	—	—	—	58		Fame
1982	"Anyone Can See"	42	—	—	—	—	—	—	—	—	—		Anyone Can See
1982	"My Baby (He's Something Else)"	—	—	—	—	—	—	—	—	—	—		Anyone Can See
1983	"Flashdance... What a Feeling"	1	1	1	3	2	17	1	1	1	2	RIAA: Gold; BPI: Gold; BVMI: Gold; MC: 2× Platinum	Flashdance / What a Feelin'
1983	"Why Me?"	13	5	23	17	—	—	24	6	4	86		What a Feelin'
1983	"The Dream (Hold On to Your Dream)"	37	84	—	—	—	—	—	—	—	—		D.C. Cab / What a Feelin'
1984	"Breakdance"	8	19	10	53	—	—	25	20	20	88		What a Feelin'
1984	"You Were Made for Me"	78	—	—	—	—	—	—	—	—	—		What a Feelin'
1987	"Girlfriends"	—	—	—	—	—	—	—	—	—	—		Carasmatic
1995	"Rhythm of My Life"	—	—	—	—	—	—	—	—	—	—		Non-album singles
1996	"You Need Me (Ti sento)"	—	—	—	—	—	—	—	—	—	—		Non-album singles
2001	"What a Feeling" (with DJ BoBo)	—	—	—	3	—	—	—	—	2	—		Planet Colors
2004	"Downtown"	—	—	—	—	—	—	—	—	—	—		Downtown: A Street Tale
"—" denotes a recording that did not chart or was not released in that territory.

=== Soundtrack appearances ===
Year	Album	Track(s)
1971	The Me Nobody Knows	"Black"
1980	Fame	"Fame", "Out Here on My Own", "Hot Lunch Jam", "I Sing the Body Electric"
1982	Killing 'em Softly	"City Nights"
1983	Flashdance	"Flashdance... What a Feeling"
1983	D.C. Cab	"The Dream (Hold On to Your Dream)"
1984	Going Bananas	"Going Bananas" (TV series theme song)
1984	City Heat	"Embraceable You", "Get Happy"
1985	Certain Fury	"Certain Fury"
1986	Busted Up	"Busted Up", "Dying For Your Love", "I Can't Help Feeling Empty"
1986	The Longshot	"The Long Shot"
1989	All Dogs Go to Heaven	"Love Survives" (with Freddie Jackson)
1989	Happily Ever After	"Love is the Reason"
1990	Caged in Paradiso	"Paradiso"
1990	China Cry	"No One But You"
1992	The Magic Voyage	"We'll Always Be Together"
1997	The Full Monty	"Flashdance... What a Feeling" (re-recording)
2004	Downtown: A Street Tale	"Downtown"

=== Vocal appearances on other albums ===
- 1986: Brecker Brothers – Détente (background)
- 1987: Jimmy Maelen – Beats Workin'
- 1982: Stanley Turrentine – Home Again
- 2001: DJ BoBo – Planet Colors
- 2002: DJ BoBo – Celebration

== Stage acting ==
- 1968: Maggie Flynn
- 1970: The Me Nobody Knows
- 1972: Via Galactica
- 1973: Lotta
- 1978: Ain't Misbehavin' (replaced by Charlayne Woodard during previews)
- 1979: Got Tu Go Disco
- 1980: The Wiz
- 1992: Jesus Christ Superstar
- 1996: What a Feeling!: The Rock & Pop Musicals in Concert

== Filmography ==
=== Television ===
Year	Title	Role	Note
1970–71	Love of Life	Daisy Allen	Daytime drama
1971–72	The Electric Company	Iris	Band member of the Short Circus; 130 episodes
1976	Kojak	Amy	Episode: "A Hair-Trigger Away"
1977	What's Happening!!	Maria Torres	Episode: "Rerun Gets Married"
1979	Roots: The Next Generations	Bertha Palmer Haley	Miniseries (3 episodes)
1980	Guyana Tragedy: The Story of Jim Jones	Alice Jefferson	Movie
1981	Sing Along with Mitch 20th Anniversary	Herself	Musical special
1981	Irene	Irene Cannon	Sitcom pilot
1983	For Us the Living: The Medgar Evers Story	Myrlie Evers	American Playhouse movie
1988	Bustin' Loose	Herself	Episode: "What's a Nice Girl Like You...?"
1991	Gabriel's Fire	Celine Bird	Episode: "Birds Gotta Fly"
1992	Hearts Are Wild	Dorah	Episode 1.8

=== Film ===
Year	Title	Role	Note
1975	Aaron Loves Angela	Angela	
1976	Sparkle	Sparkle Williams	
1976	Apple Pie	Dancer	
1980	Fame	Coco Hernandez	
1982	Killing 'em Softly	Jane	
1982	Sister, Sister	Sisina "Sissy" Lovejoy	
1983	D.C. Cab	Herself	
1984	City Heat	Ginny Lee	
1985	Certain Fury	Tracy	
1986	Busted Up	Simone Bird	
1989	Caged in Paradiso	Eva	
1989	Happily Ever After	Snow White	Voice role
1992	Beauty and the Beast	Beauty	Voice role
1992	The Magic Voyage	Marilyn	Voice role
1994	The Jungle King	Leonette	Voice role; direct-to-video
1995	Beyond Awareness to Action: Ending Abuse of Women	Herself/host	Documentary short
1996	The Hunchback of Notre Dame	Melody	Voice role; direct-to-video
2004	Downtown: A Street Tale	Neighbor	Cameo

== Awards and nominations ==
Year	Award	Category	Nominated work	Result	Ref.
1983	Academy Awards	Best Original Song	"Flashdance... What a Feeling" (shared with Giorgio Moroder and Keith Forsey)	Won	
1984	American Music Awards	Favorite Pop/Rock Song	"Flashdance... What a Feeling"	Nominated	
1984	American Music Awards	Favorite Soul/R&B Female Artist	Herself	Nominated	
1981	Billboard Year-End	New Female Single Artist	Herself	Won	
1983	Billboard Year-End	Top Pop Single Artists – Female	Herself	Won	
1983	British Academy Film Awards	Best Original Song	"Flashdance... What a Feeling" (shared with Giorgio Moroder and Keith Forsey)	Nominated	
1980	Golden Globe Awards	Best Actress in a Motion Picture – Musical or Comedy	Fame	Nominated	
1983	Golden Globe Awards	Best Original Song	"Flashdance... What a Feeling" (shared with Giorgio Moroder and Keith Forsey)	Won	
1981	Grammy Awards	Best New Artist	Herself	Nominated	
1981	Grammy Awards	Best Pop Vocal Performance, Female	"Fame"	Nominated	
1984	Grammy Awards	Album of the Year	Flashdance: Original Soundtrack from the Motion Picture (shared with other artists)	Nominated	
1984	Grammy Awards	Record of the Year	"Flashdance... What a Feeling" (shared with Giorgio Moroder)	Nominated	
1984	Grammy Awards	Best Pop Vocal Performance, Female	"Flashdance... What a Feeling"	Won	
1984	Grammy Awards	Best Album of Original Score Written for a Motion Picture or A Television Special	Flashdance: Original Soundtrack from the Motion Picture (shared with other songwriters)	Won	
1982	NAACP Image Awards	Outstanding Actress in a Television Movie, Miniseries or Drama Special	Sister, Sister	Won	
1984	People's Choice Awards	Favorite Theme/Song from a Motion Picture	"Flashdance... What a Feeling"	Won	

== See also ==
- List of artists who reached number one on the U.S. Dance Club Songs chart
- List of artists who reached number one in the United States
- List of Billboard number-one dance club songs
- List of Billboard number-one singles
- List of Puerto Ricans
