= Lady, Lady, Lady =

Single by Joe Esposito

from the album Flashdance: Original Soundtrack from the Motion Picture
- Released: 1983
- Recorded: 1983
- Genre: Pop
- Length: 4:09
- Label: Casablanca
- Composer: Giorgio Moroder
- Lyricist: Keith Forsey
- Producer: Giorgio Moroder

"Lady, Lady, Lady" is a 1983 song written by Giorgio Moroder and Keith Forsey and performed by singer Joe Esposito for the film Flashdance. It was released as a single from the soundtrack to the film. The song was originally titled "Lady, Lady" and recorded for Moroder and Esposito's collaborative album Solitary Men.

It was a minor hit on the Billboard Hot 100 chart, peaking at No. 86. It fared better on the Adult Contemporary chart, peaking at No. 36. The song peaked in the Austrian Single Charts at No. 7, and in Switzerland at No. 19.

A remix of the song also appeared on Moroder's 1985 album Innovisions as "Lady Lady." In 2017, the song was used in the film Call Me by Your Name.
