= You Were Made for Me (Irene Cara song) =

Single by Irene Cara

from the album What a Feelin'
- B-side: "Receiving"
- Released: July 1984
- Recorded: 1983
- Genre: Adult contemporary; pop
- Length: 4:20 (album version); 4:13 (7-inch remix); 3:42 (7-inch remix/edit)
- Label: Network; Geffen
- Songwriters: Irene Cara; Eddie Brown
- Producer: James Newton Howard

Irene Cara singles chronology
"Breakdance" (1984)	"You Were Made for Me" (1984)	"Girlfriends" (1987)

"You Were Made for Me" is a song written by Eddie Brown and the song's performer, Irene Cara. It was the fourth and final single that originated on her 1983 LP What a Feelin' and the only ballad included on it. While Giorgio Moroder had written the music for most of the songs on the album, Cara is credited as the composer on "You Were Made for Me". Whereas the previous singles ("Why Me?", "The Dream", and "Breakdance") spawned dance remixes and did well on the pop and R&B charts, "You Were Made for Me" had its biggest success on the Adult Contemporary charts in the US and Canada. It was also her last chart hit in the US.

== Background ==
Irene Cara had the biggest hit of her career in the spring of 1983 when "Flashdance... What a Feeling" was the number one song on the Billboard Hot 100 for 6 weeks. Her follow-up album borrowed its name from the dance-pop chart topper, which was composed and produced by Giorgio Moroder. Cara continued working with Moroder on the new album but explained how it meant delegating the composing duties to him: "I usually write music; it's only working with Giorgio that I've become a lyricist. I had no choice since he's a composer." "You Were Made for Me" was the one song on the album for which she wrote the music.

== Release ==
The July 28, 1984, issue of Billboard included the debut of "You Were Made for Me" on the magazine's Hot 100, where it spent 5 weeks and peaked at number 78. The August 4 issue marked the first appearance of the song on their Black Singles chart, where it got as high as number 83 over the course of 4 weeks, as well as its first of 13 weeks on their list of the most popular Adult Contemporary songs in the US, during which time it reached number 10. On Canada's Adult Contemporary chart in RPM magazine, it made it to number 5.

== Critical reception ==
Billboard magazine put "You Were Made for Me" in the context of the rest of the album in its review. "In contrast to her string of high-energy hits from the What a Feelin' LP, this one's a cool, slow ballad that gives Cara the chance to ease into a melody." On their page of singles reviews, the song was put into the "Pop Pick" category, which was for "new releases with the greatest chart potential".

== Track listing and formats ==
- US 7" single
1. "You Were Made for Me" – 4:13
2. "Receiving" – 3:41
- Canada 7" single
1. "You Were Made for Me" – 3:42
2. "Receiving" – 3:41
- US 7" promo single
1. "You Were Made for Me" (Remix) – 4:13
2. "You Were Made for Me" (Remix/Edit) – 3:29 Fade to 3:42

== Credits and personnel ==
From the liner notes for What a Feelin':

- Irene Cara – lead vocals; additional background vocals
- Bunny Hull – additional background vocals
- Charlotte Crossley – background vocals
- David Lasley – background vocals
- Bruce Roberts – background vocals
- Wendy McKenzie – additional background vocals
- Mike Baird – drums
- Lenny Castro – percussion
- James Newton Howard – producer; piano, synthesizer
- Dean Parks – guitar
- Neil Stubenhaus – bass
- Richie Zito – arranger
- Elliot Scheiner – engineer
- Rick Ruggieri – engineer
- Jack Joseph Puig – mixing engineer

7-inch remix

From the liner notes of the 7-inch single:

- Michael Brauer – remixer

== Charts ==
Chart (1984)	Peak position
Canada Adult Contemporary (RPM)	5
US Billboard Adult Contemporary	10
US Billboard Black Singles	83
US Billboard Hot 100	78

== Bibliography ==
- Whitburn, Joel (2004), Joel Whitburn Presents Top R&B/Hip-Hop Singles, 1942-2004, Record Research Inc., ISBN 0898201608
- Whitburn, Joel (2007), Joel Whitburn Presents Billboard Top Adult Songs, 1961–2006, Record Research, ISBN 978-0898201697
- Whitburn, Joel (2009), Joel Whitburn's Top Pop Singles, 1955-2008, Record Research Inc., ISBN 978-0898201802
