= Breakdance (song) =

Single by Irene Cara

from the album What a Feelin'
- B-side: "Cue Me Up"; "You Were Made for Me"
- Released: March 1984
- Recorded: 1983
- Genre: Post-disco; synth-pop
- Length: 3:02 (single edit); 3:26 (album version); 4:24 (dub/instrumental); 5:24 (extended remix); 6:01 (long version)
- Label: Network; Geffen; Epic
- Songwriters: Giorgio Moroder; Irene Cara; Bunny Hull
- Producer: Giorgio Moroder

Irene Cara singles chronology
| "The Dream (Hold On to Your Dream)" (1983) | "Breakdance" (1984) | "You Were Made for Me" (1984) |

Audio video
- "Irene Cara - Breakdance (Radio Edit)" on YouTube

"Breakdance" is a song written by Giorgio Moroder, Bunny Hull, and the song's performer, Irene Cara. Moroder's obsession with the dance hit "Rockit" by Herbie Hancock fueled his composition of the music, and Cara was inspired by the street performers she saw growing up in the South Bronx to write lyrics about what was then called breakdancing. Released in March 1984, it was the third single that originated on her What a Feelin' LP and her first to make the top ten in the US since the album's title track went to number one almost a year earlier. "Breakdance" also charted in several other countries and had a dance remix that was also well received.

== Background ==
In the spring of 1983, "Flashdance... What a Feeling" spent six weeks at number one on the Billboard Hot 100 and became Irene Cara's highest charting single. She continued working with the song's producer-composer, Giorgio Moroder, on her next album What a Feelin', which was released on November 2 of that year. Moroder wrote the music for most of the songs on the album, including "Breakdance", which Cara said was inspired by Herbie Hancock's recent number one dance hit, "Rockit". "Hancock is a legendary jazz artist, and all of a sudden he comes out with this hip hop track that was phenomenal. Giorgio was obsessed with it, so he based 'Breakdance' after 'Rockit'."

Cara then had the assignment of putting words to Moroder's composition. "I had to find a way to make it into a song because Herbie's song (and Giorgio's track) was an instrumental." She described how her childhood and adolescence in the South Bronx gave her the subject to write about. "I grew up in neighborhoods where the kids basically pioneered hip hop dancing and breakdancing. I lived in neighborhoods where kids were spinning on their heads on cardboard boards right in front of my building." Although the term "breakdancing" has since been derided by its participants as an attempt by the mainstream media to capitalize on a marginalized subculture, Cara explains that "it wasn't just me writing about something that was a fad ... it was me writing about something that I lived through. So I just used what I had experienced growing up in the city and drew on that for the lyric and the melody."

== Release ==
"Breakdance" debuted on Billboard magazine's Hot 100 in the issue of the magazine dated March 24, 1984, and stayed on the chart for 19 weeks, during which time it peaked at number 8. On other pop singles charts, the song hit number 4 in South Africa, 10 in Canada, 19 in Australia, 20 in Sweden and Switzerland, 25 in New Zealand, 53 in West Germany, and 88 in the UK. In Billboard's April 7 issue, the song made its first appearance on the magazine's Black Singles chart, where it reached number 23 over the course of 12 weeks. That issue also marked the first of 10 weeks for the 12-inch single on the magazine's Dance/Disco Top 80 chart, where it got as high as number 13.

== Critical reception ==
When Cara's What a Feelin' album first came out at the end of 1983, Billboard Dance Trax columnist Brian Chin heralded "Breakdance" as one of the songs that was clearly meant to have a dance remix. Upon the release of the single and remixes the following March, Cashbox's Skip Harris described the Extended Dubb as "a killer".

== Track listing and formats ==
- US 7" single
1. "Breakdance" – 3:02
2. "Cue Me Up" – 3:25
- US 12" maxi single
1. "Breakdance" (Extended Remix) – 5:24
2. "Breakdance" (Extended Dubb) – 4:24
- Brazil 7" single
1. "Breakdance" – 3:26
2. "You Were Made for Me" – 4:20
- Germany 7" single
1. "Breakdance" – 3:26
2. "Breakdance" (Instrumental Version) – 4:25
- Netherlands 12" maxi single
1. "Breakdance" (Long Version) – 6:01
2. "Breakdance" (Instrumental) – 4:25
- UK 12" single
1. "Breakdance" (Extended Remix) – 5:24
2. "Breakdance" (Dub Mix) – 4:24
3. "Cue Me Up" – 3:25

== Credits and personnel ==
From the liner notes for What a Feelin':

- Irene Cara – lead vocals, background vocals
- Arthur Barrow – bass guitar, keyboards
- Richie Zito – arranger; guitar, Linn drums, Simmons drums, keyboards
- Bunny Hull – background vocals
- Giorgio Moroder – producer; background vocals
- Brian Reeves – engineer
- Mike Frondelli – engineer
- Dave Concors – engineer

== Charts ==
=== Weekly charts ===
Weekly chart performance for "Breakdance"
| Chart (1984) | Peak position |
|---|---|
| Australia (Kent Music Report) | 19 |
| Canada Top 50 Singles (RPM) | 10 |
| New Zealand (Recorded Music NZ) | 25 |
| South Africa | 4 |
| Sweden (Sverigetopplistan) | 20 |
| Switzerland (Schweizer Hitparade) | 20 |
| UK Singles (Official Charts) | 88 |
| US Billboard Black Singles | 23 |
| US Billboard Dance/Disco Top 80 | 13 |
| US Billboard Hot 100 | 8 |
| US Cash Box Charts | 10 |
| West Germany (GfK) | 53 |
| Finland (Suomen virallinen singlelista) | 9 |

=== Year-end charts ===
1984 year-end chart performance for "Breakdance"
| Chart (1984) | Position |
|---|---|
| Canada Top Singles (RPM) | 83 |
| US Billboard Hot 100 | 69 |
| US Cash Box Top 100 | 77 |

== Bibliography ==
- Whitburn, Joel (2004a), Joel Whitburn Presents Top R&B/Hip-Hop Singles, 1942-2004, Record Research Inc., ISBN 0898201608
- Whitburn, Joel (2004b), Joel Whitburn's Hot Dance/Disco, 1974-2003, Record Research Inc., ISBN 089820156X
- Whitburn, Joel (2009), Joel Whitburn's Top Pop Singles, 1955-2008, Record Research Inc., ISBN 978-0898201802
