= Why Me? (Irene Cara song) =

Single by Irene Cara

from the album What a Feelin'
- B-side: "Talk Too Much"
- Released: October 1983
- Recorded: 1983
- Genre: Post-disco; synth-pop; dance-rock; Hi-NRG
- Length: 3:55 (single edit); 4:37 (album version); 7:03 (12-inch mix)
- Label: Network; Geffen; Epic
- Songwriter(s): Giorgio Moroder; Irene Cara; Keith Forsey
- Producer(s): Giorgio Moroder

Irene Cara singles chronology
| "Flashdance... What a Feeling" (1983) | "Why Me?" (1983) | "The Dream (Hold On to Your Dream)" (1983) |

"Why Me?" is a song written by Giorgio Moroder, Keith Forsey, and the song's performer, Irene Cara, that was the first official single to be released from Cara's 1983 album, What a Feelin', making it the follow-up to the songwriting trio's previous project for Cara, "Flashdance... What a Feeling". This new collaboration, however, was described as having more of a hard rock edge and had lyrics that conveyed the difficulties in a relationship.

Although Moroder was criticized for having borrowed from his older material, Cara received praise for her performance. The song reached the top 20 on the pop charts in the US and was even more successful in Australia and a few European countries, where it peaked in the top 10.

Cara plays a woman given two happy endings in the music video for the song. She goes from audition to audition in New York and finally makes a name for herself while at the same time leaving a controlling romantic partner and finding a new love interest. Although the song was released in October 1983, the music video did not debut on MTV until December of that year.

== Background ==
The first single released from the soundtrack album of the 1983 film Flashdance was titled "Flashdance... What a Feeling" and spent six weeks at number one on the Billboard Hot 100 that began in the magazine's May 28, 1983, issue. Giorgio Moroder, who composed the score for the film, also wrote the music for that song, and Keith Forsey wrote the lyrics with the song's performer, Irene Cara. Moroder and Cara continued their work together on her next album, What a Feelin', and Forsey joined them to write some of the songs, including the first new single released from the album, "Why Me?". The lyrics express the emotional pain of the singer, who feels her ex has made a mistake in ending their relationship.

== Critical reception ==
Cash Box magazine described "Why Me?" as "an uptempo tune with a hard rock edge and more than its share of recycled riffs from Moroder's 1980 success, 'Call Me'." They also pointed out that "Cara's strong, lean energy puts this effort in the plus column."

== Release ==
The August 6, 1983, issue of Cash Box magazine reported that Cara taped an interview with Entertainment Tonight that included the first airing of "Why Me?". The magazine's review of the song in the October 22 issue began, "After numerous delays, Cara's latest non-soundtrack project has finally seen the light of day."

"Why Me?" debuted on the Hot 100 in the issue of Billboard that was also dated October 22, and the song was on the chart for 15 weeks. The review of her next single, "The Dream (Hold On to Your Dream)", in the December 10 issue of Cash Box noted that "Why Me?" was still moving up the charts. The singles charts in that issue and the December 10 issue of Billboard both included the debut of "The Dream" on their respective lists of the 100 most popular singles in the US and listed "Why Me?" with bullets indicating noteworthy airplay and sales gains, giving her two songs moving up the charts at the same time. "Why Me?" peaked at number 13 on the Hot 100 and number 15 on the Cash Box singles chart.

The October 29 issue of Billboard marked the song's first appearance on the Black Singles chart, where it got as high as number 41 over the course of 12 weeks. The song made it to number 7 during an 11-week run on the Dance/Disco Top 80 chart in Billboard, which began in the November 19 issue. It also reached number 4 in Switzerland, number 5 in Australia and Norway, number 6 in Sweden, number 17 in West Germany, number 24 in New Zealand, and number 86 in the United Kingdom.

== Music video ==
The promotional clip for "Why Me?" features Cara playing a young woman unhappy with her career and her love life. It opens with a montage of Cara walking the streets of Manhattan, primarily in the vicinity of Broadway theaters, and attending auditions. She appears frustrated in the brief takes of her as she exits a theater stage entrance, passes by others waiting in line to audition on her way out of another, crosses out an ad circled in a newspaper and throws it in a trash can in the park, where she begins to sing about her relationship woes. A flashback presents her in an apartment with the man she is singing about in the song. She dances around to a record as he is working on a sketch at an easel. He gets fed up and shoves the phonograph needle off of the record to stop the music, and she gets angry and leaves to walk the streets of the city and continue with the lyrics of the song.

Broken glass is a recurring motif throughout the video. The opening montage includes a shot of her feet prancing across the miniature seesaw created by a small broken board with shards of broken glass alongside it in a gutter. Her artist boyfriend is sketching a woman as seen through a broken window with a section of the muntin missing. When she is alone in the apartment and the boyfriend startles her upon entering, she drops a cocktail glass, and the video cuts to a cocktail glass crashing to the floor in a bar Cara visits where a waiter has just dropped it. The bridge of the song provides an instrumental break to interweave very tightly edited footage that summarizes what has been shown and includes a trio of shots that adds to the motif: one of her from the knees down as she passes shards of broken glass on the sidewalk, another where she lifts a shard of broken glass out of a puddle, and a third showing the multi-pane window of what appears to be an abandoned warehouse. The light shining through it from another window on the other side of the building shows that the panes of glass have all had portions broken out.

The bridge montage continues with a review of her bad relationship and with what was shown from the opening montage of her auditions, including one in particular where she is given the chance to show her dancing skills. The frame freezes on the last of her dance moves, and in the next shot that image is visible through the frame of the warehouse window, where the remaining shards from the individual panes fly together over the image to form a transparent female figure. Rapid editing then alternates back and forth between this figure and Cara in a white party dress, and the story jumps forward to Cara in this attire being the guest of honor at a party where everyone raises their glasses to toast her success. Her date for the party brings her a drink. Instead of the artist she had been living with, her date is a man who had been noticing her around Manhattan from afar. As she finishes the song, she is shown in another apartment where she cuddles up to this new partner on the couch.

As with the video for her next single, "The Dream (Hold On to Your Dream)", "Why Me?" was directed and edited by Doug Dowdle and produced by Jeffrey Abelson. According to Billboard, the debut of the videos on MTV came just one week apart. The magazine's New Videos Added section of its MTV Adds & Rotation column listed the "Why Me?" clip as having been added to the cable channel's playlist of music videos as of December 7 in the magazine's December 17 issue, eight weeks after the song's debut on the Hot 100. The December 24 issue noted the addition of "The Dream" to the cable channel's playlist as of December 14.

== Track listing and formats ==
- US 7" single
1. "Why Me?" – 3:53
2. "Talk Too Much" – 3:57
- US 12" maxi single
1. "Why Me?" – 7:02
2. "Why Me?" (Instrumental Dubb) – 4:53
- UK 12" single
1. "Why Me?" (Extended Version) – 7:02
2. "Why Me?" (Instrumental Version) – 4:46
3. "Talk Too Much" – 3:57

== Credits and personnel ==
From the liner notes for the original 1983 vinyl release of What a Feelin':

- Irene Cara – vocals
- Arthur Barrow – bass guitar, keyboards
- Richie Zito – guitar, Linn drums, arranger
- Merry Clayton – background vocals
- Joe Esposito – background vocals
- Stephanie Spruill – background vocals
- Giorgio Moroder – producer
- Brian Reeves – engineer
- Mike Frondelli – engineer
- Dave Concors – engineer
- Harry Langdon – photography

12-inch remix

From the liner notes of the 12-inch single:

- John "Jellybean" Benitez – remixing
- John "Tokes" Potoker – mixing engineer
- Melanie West – assistant engineer

Mixed at Sigma Sound Studios, NY

== Charts ==
=== Weekly charts ===
| Chart (1983–1984) | Peak position |
|---|---|
| Australia (Kent Music Report) | 5 |
| New Zealand (Recorded Music NZ) | 24 |
| Norway (VG-lista) | 5 |
| Sweden (Sverigetopplistan) | 6 |
| Switzerland (Schweizer Hitparade) | 4 |
| UK Singles (OCC) | 86 |
| US Billboard Hot 100 | 13 |
| US Dance Club Songs (Billboard) | 7 |
| US R&B Singles (Billboard) | 41 |
| US Cash Box Top 100 | 15 |
| West Germany (GfK) | 17 |
| South Africa (Springbok) | 7 |
| Finland (Suomen virallinen singlelista) | 4 |
| Europe (Eurochart Hot 100) | 24 |

=== Year-end charts ===
| Chart (1984) | Position |
|---|---|
| Australia (Kent Music Report) | 43 |

== Sales ==
The single has sold 200,000 units in France.

== Bibliography ==
- Bronson, Fred (2003), The Billboard Book of Number One Hits, Billboard Books, ISBN 9780823076772
- Whitburn, Joel (2004a), Joel Whitburn Presents Top R&B/Hip-Hop Singles, 1942-2004, Record Research Inc., ISBN 0898201608
- Whitburn, Joel (2004b), Joel Whitburn's Hot Dance/Disco, 1974-2003, Record Research Inc., ISBN 089820156X
- Whitburn, Joel (2009), Joel Whitburn's Top Pop Singles, 1955-2008, Record Research Inc., ISBN 978-0898201802
