= They Bite =

- VHS cover
- Directed by: Brett Piper
- Screenplay by: Brett Piper
- Starring: Donna Frotscher; Ron Jeremy; Nick Baldasare
- Music by: Stephen Melillo
- Release date: April 2, 1996
- Running time: 112 minutes
- Country: United States
- Language: English
- Budget: $130,000

They Bite is a 1996 American science-fiction horror film directed by Brett Piper and starring Ron Jeremy, Nick Baldasare, Donna Frotscher, and Christina Veronica.

The film follows some of the premise covered in the Roger Corman film Humanoids from the Deep – sea creatures coming to shore and attacking and mating with humans, but also contains the idea of a film-within-a-film device. A film crew (Nick Baldasare plays the director Mel Duncan) are on location making a film Invasion of the Fishfuckers – which happens to be a story about sea creatures coming ashore and attacking and mating with humans. Ron Jeremy is part of this film crew. Whilst they are making the film, coincidentally the very thing they're filming seems to be happening around them.

== Production ==
Filming took place in various locations around and near Bay County, Florida.

== Release ==
They Bite was released on VHS and has not been released on DVD or Blu-ray.
