= Charlie Barnett (comedian) =

American comedian and actor (1954-1996)

- Born: Charles Barnett; September 23, 1954; Bluefield, West Virginia, U.S.
- Died: March 16, 1996 (aged 41); Flushing, New York, U.S.
- Occupations: Actor; comedian
- Years active: 1970s–1996

Charles Barnett (September 23, 1954 – March 16, 1996) was an American comedian and actor. He is best known for his role as Nugart Neville "Noogie" Lamont on the NBC television series Miami Vice. Barnett was a mentor and major influence on comedians Dave Chappelle and Jeff Ross.

== Life and career ==
Barnett was born in Bluefield, West Virginia. He first made a name for himself in the late 1970s and early 1980s, performing several shows of raunchy comedy a day at outdoor parks in New York City, most notably in Washington Square Park. In September 1980, Barnett auditioned for Saturday Night Live. Producer Jean Doumanian was ready to hire him; however, Barnett was self-conscious about his poor reading skills, and he skipped a follow-up reading. His spot in the cast was ultimately given to Eddie Murphy. Barnett was reportedly envious and resentful of Murphy for several years, although in 1983 he told Jet Magazine: "Now that I'm making it, I watch Saturday Night Live every Saturday."

From 1984 to 1987, Barnett had a recurring role as Nugart Neville "Noogie" Lamont on Miami Vice, an informant for the shows two main characters, James "Sonny" Crockett and Ricardo Tubbs. During his time on the show, Barnett did not get along with lead actor Don Johnson. Johnson felt Barnett was stealing scenes and a rumored drug-fueled incident on set led to Barnett being kicked off and banned from the show by Johnson. Barnett stated about Johnson, "Don’t like him. Don Johnson? He doesn’t like me either. I had a fistfight with him, right on the set, first few days. 'Cause I stole the episode. It was called 'Cool Runnin'. I stole it. They were talking about how this black guy's great, and the man just started fuckin' with me, saying 'You been on this show for a week and you think it’s yours.' And so I said, 'Fuck you,' and we got into it."

Barnett was also a mentor of comedian Dave Chappelle. At the age of fourteen, Chappelle was booed off the stage at the Apollo Theater. Barnett took Chappelle and showcased him in front of the crowds at Washington Square Park, where Barnett had made a name for himself. Chappelle was a close friend of Barnett, as was Jeff Ross, who was heavily influenced by Barnett's crowd work in the park.

Barnett contracted HIV as a result of heroin abuse and died from AIDS on March 16, 1996.

== Select filmography ==
- They Bite (1996)
- Mondo New York (1988)
- Nobody's Fool (1986)
- Beer (1985)
- My Man Adam (1985)
- T.J. Hooker (1985)
- Miami Vice (1984–1987)
- D.C. Cab (1983)
