= Al Coury =

American record executive and producer (1934–2013)

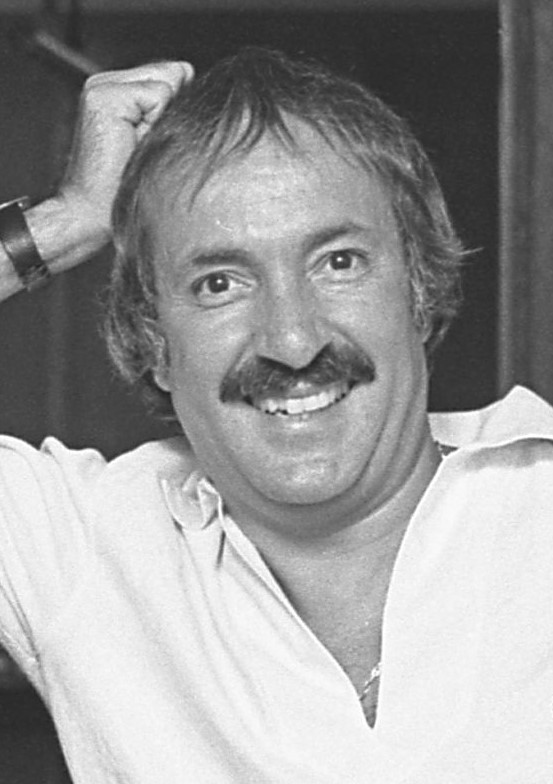
- Coury in 1978

Background information
- Born: Albert Eli Coury; October 21, 1934; Worcester, Massachusetts, U.S.
- Died: August 8, 2013 (aged 78) Thousand Oaks, California, U.S.
- Occupations: Vice-president of Capitol Records, co-founder and president of RSO Records, general manager head of promotion Geffen Records
- Years active: 1957–1994

Albert Eli Coury (October 21, 1934 – August 8, 2013) was an American music record executive and producer who was vice-president of Capitol Records, co-founder of RSO Records, founder of Network Records and general manager of Geffen Records.

Coury released some of the best selling albums of all time such as the soundtracks of Saturday Night Fever, Grease and Flashdance, and albums such as Pink Floyd's The Dark Side of the Moon and Guns N' Roses' Appetite for Destruction, which earned him the title of the "Vince Lombardi of the record business".

In a career that spanned almost 40 years, Coury helped to develop the careers of artists such as the Beatles, Nat King Cole, the Beach Boys, Pink Floyd, the Bee Gees, Eric Clapton, Irene Cara, Glen Campbell, Bob Seger, Guns N' Roses, Aerosmith, Don Henley, Cher and Linda Ronstadt.

== Biography ==
Albert Eli Coury was born October 21, 1934, to Lebanese parents and grew up in Worcester, Massachusetts. He played the trumpet as a teenager.

In 1957, he joined Capitol Records as a promotor in New England, and was later transferred to Los Angeles to become Capitol's first A&R executive (head of artist development) until he rose to vice-president of marketing, sales/promotion and A&R. Time magazine called him "The Man Who Sells the Sizzle".

== Capitol Records ==
Coury was instrumental in the transition of Capitol Records from the jazz and pop era, led by the label's artists such as Frank Sinatra and Peggy Lee, into the rock and roll era that started in the early 60s. At Capitol, Coury worked closely with the Beatles before and after their break-up in 1970 as solo artists. Coury worked on every album the Beatles released in the United States. He was also a central figure in the Beach Boys' career since they first signed up with Capitol in 1962. Coury was responsible for the success of their song "Barbara Ann" in 1965, which he picked as a single from their album Beach Boys' Party! without telling the band, making one of the Beach Boys' most successful hits of their career and their first highest-charting hit in Europe.

As vice-president of Capitol Records, Coury also led the re-establishing of Capitol as a major label after the Beatles broke up and the Beach Boys left the label in 1970. Between 1970 and 1974, he released albums of artists such as Linda Ronstadt, Helen Reddy, Grand Funk Railroad, Pink Floyd, Glen Campbell, Natalie Cole, and others. Coury worked on Helen Reddy's "I Am Woman" single and album in 1972 which gave Capitol its first no.1 song on the Billboard Hot 100 since 1970 and earned Reddy a Grammy Award. He also co-produced Ronstadt's self-titled album in 1972, a front-runner in country rock, and released her last album with Capitol Heart Like a Wheel in 1974, which became Ronstadt's breakthrough and earned her a Grammy Award for Album of the Year as well. Coury also released Ronstadt's single "You're No Good" as part of the album which became Ronstadt's only single to top the Billboard Hot 100. In 1973, he was instrumental in the release of Pink Floyd's The Dark Side of the Moon, which became one of the best selling albums of all time, being the one who persuaded Pink Floyd to issue the single "Money", the band's first hit in the United States. In 1974, Coury brought the song "Rhinestone Cowboy" written by Larry Weiss, to Glen Campbell and promised to make it a hit if Campbell recorded it. "Rhinestone Cowboy" became Campbell's first No. 1 single in 1975 and earned him a Grammy Award nomination. The song also became Campbell's largest-selling single and one of his best-known recordings, with over 2 million copies initially sold.

Coury's last signing to Capitol Records was the group Dolenz, Jones, Boyce & Hart, made up of former members of the Monkees, Micky Dolenz and Davy Jones, and songwriters Boyce and Hart, who had written several Monkees hits.

== Work with ex-Beatles ==
Coury was important to several solo Beatles releases in the 1970s, particularly Paul McCartney's 1973 album Band On The Run and John Lennon's 1974 album Walls and Bridges, both of which reached the top of the charts and yielded #1 singles.

It was Coury who persuaded McCartney to include the successful single "Helen Wheels" on the US version of Band On The Run (because it was last-minute, the lyrics to the song were not included on the lyric sheet). He then chose the song "Jet" as the second single, which helped make the album the most successful of McCartney's solo efforts.

Coury's strategies made the album Band on the Run the first album in history to become no. 1 on the Billboard charts on three different occasions and one of the best selling albums of the 1970s Band on the Run remains McCartney's most successful album and the most celebrated of his post-Beatles works. McCartney attributed the success of the album mainly on Coury's advice.

The following year, Lennon invited Coury to "work his magic" promoting Lennon's Walls and Bridges album. It was Coury who chose the first single, "Whatever Gets You Thru The Night", which became Lennon's first #1 solo hit (and the only one in his lifetime). Coury was also instrumental in the long-awaited release of Lennon's 1975 album Rock 'n' Roll, bartering with producer Phil Spector to retrieve the master tapes from their abandoned 1973 recording sessions.

== RSO Records creation ==
After being bypassed for the presidency of Capitol Records, Coury left Capitol to become the co-founder and president of RSO Records with entertainment mogul Robert Stigwood. At RSO, he released the soundtracks of Saturday Night Fever and Grease in 1978, two of the best selling albums of all time, making RSO one of the most financially successful labels of the 1970s in a span of only a few years. Both soundtracks of Saturday Night Fever and Grease went on to sell more than 30 million copies worldwide each, a record that would not be surpassed until Michael Jackson's Thriller album was released five years later.

Other albums released by RSO Records include the soundtracks of Fame, Sparkle, The Empire Strikes Back, Return of the Jedi, Times Square as well as albums such as Eric Clapton's Slowhand. Coury also worked extensively with the Bee Gees and Eric Clapton, two of the RSO's flagship artists.

== Network Records label ==
In 1981, Coury created a new record label, Network Records. One of the label's initial successes was the release of the hit "Flashdance... What a Feeling" by Irene Cara, whom Coury had signed to his label in 1982, and which became part of the soundtrack of Flashdance in 1983. The song won the Grammy Award for Best Female Pop Vocal Performance and an Academy Award for Best Original Song in 1984. The soundtrack album received a Grammy nomination for Album of the Year and won for Best Album of Original Score Written for a Motion Picture or a Television Special. The album peaked at No. 1 in the U.S. Billboard Hot 100 and sold more than 20 million copies worldwide, also making it one of the best selling albums of all time.

Other releases of Network Records include Irene Cara's debut album Anyone Can See, Del Shannon's Drop Down And Get Me album, produced by Tom Petty and featuring the hit single "Sea Of Love", Days of Innocence debut album by Australian band Moving Pictures which became multiplatinum, and Todd Rundgren's band Utopia's album self-titled Utopia in 1982, all of which hit the charts.

In 1985, Irene Cara sued Coury, who had signed her to his Network Records. In a $10 million breach-of-contract suit, Cara alleged that Coury was cheating her out of her royalties. The jury awarded her $1.5 million but the label went bankrupt and never paid her. Cara said she believed Coury had blackballed her in the industry.

== Geffen Records ==
In 1985, the record label Geffen Records had its worst year since its creation in 1980. Music executive David Geffen offered Al Coury a lucrative compensation package and stock in his company to become part of Geffen Records. Network Records was then merged with Geffen Records, and Coury became Geffen's general manager in 1985.

Under Coury's management Geffen Records became the decade's most successful independent record company, developing the career and hit records for Guns N' Roses, Aerosmith, Whitesnake, Peter Gabriel, Cher and Don Henley.

When he started with Geffen in 1985, he became responsible for Aerosmith's comeback, starting with the release of their album Done with Mirrors and working on all their albums until 1993. In 1987, Coury played a central role in the re-recording of the song "Here I Go Again" by Whitesnake, which Geffen's Eddie Rosenblatt was hesitant to do so, turning the song into the band's most successful charting hit.

Coury was also crucial in launching Guns N' Roses career to stardom. When Appetite for Destruction was first released in 1987 it was barely noticed and the album just sold 200,000 copies after several months, which made David Geffen close to walking away from the record.

MTV and radio stations did not want to play their "Welcome to the Jungle" video and song but, after several months of trying, Coury managed to get MTV to play their video just once a night for three nights. "Welcome to the Jungle" became the most requested video on MTV's network and Coury started sending promo samples to radio stations using the success of the video as a marketing strategy. The strategy worked and the album topped the charts in 1988 after a year of having been released, eventually making Appetite for Destruction the best selling debut album in history as well as one of the best selling albums of all time.

Coury retired from the record business in 1994. He died at the age of 78 on August 8, 2013, in Thousand Oaks, California, from complications of a stroke.

== Personal life ==
Al Coury married Mary Ann Coury in 1967 divorced in 1984. They had two children, Kacy Coury and Albert Coury Jr.

Al Coury was married to artist and children's book author, Tina Nichols Coury, from 1988 until his death in 2013.
