= D.C. Cab =

1983 film

- Theatrical release poster by Drew Struzan
- Directed by: Joel Schumacher
- Screenplay by: Joel Schumacher
- Story by: Topper Carew; Joel Schumacher
- Produced by: Topper Carew
- Starring: Adam Baldwin; Charlie Barnett; Irene Cara; Anne De Salvo; Max Gail; Mr. T; José Pérez; Paul Rodriguez; Gary Busey
- Cinematography: Dean Cundey
- Edited by: David E. Blewitt
- Music by: Giorgio Moroder
- Production companies: The Guber-Peters Company; RKO Pictures; Universal Pictures
- Distributed by: Universal Pictures
- Release date: December 16, 1983
- Running time: 100 minutes
- Country: United States
- Language: English
- Budget: $8 million
- Box office: $16 million

D.C. Cab (also known as Street Fleet) is a 1983 American comedy film written and directed by Joel Schumacher, based on a story by Topper Carew and Schumacher, and starring Max Gail, Adam Baldwin, Mr. T, Charlie Barnett, Gary Busey, Marsha Warfield, Whitman Mayo, John Diehl, Bob Zmuda, Timothy Carey, Bill Maher, and Irene Cara.

The film was released to negative reviews from critics, but Cara's song "The Dream (Hold On to Your Dream)" was a Top 40 hit, peaking at #37 on the Hot 100.

== Plot ==
Naïve but good-natured young man Albert Hockenberry arrives in Washington, D.C., with plans to work for his late father's army buddy Harold Oswelt, owner of the run-down District of Columbia Cab company. Aware of the sorry state of his business and the growing competition from the popular Emerald Cab Company, Harold wants to clean it up but does not have the financial means to do so. Complicating matters is the motley group of cab drivers that he has working for him. They all see driving as a dead-end job while they wait for better lives until Albert inspires them to work as a team.

A valuable violin is found in one of the cabs, earning Harold and his wife Myrna Oswell a $10,000 reward as owners of the cab. Harold wants to share the money with the drivers and let them invest in the cab company as partners. However, his greedy wife Myrna picks up the reward money and tosses Harold and Albert's belongings out of the house. The cabbies are not happy about losing their share of the reward, so Albert decides to donate $6,063 of his own money to the cab company and convinces the drivers to stay and make something of the company and themselves. The cabbies completely overhaul the entire business, and the revitalized company soon supplants Emerald Cab as the most popular in the city.

Later on, the cabbies work together to rescue Albert and a diplomat's two children after they're kidnapped. The film ends with a parade in D.C. Cab's honor followed by a post-credits scene with a shabby-looking dressed man climbing into the back of Tyrone Bywater's taxicab and claiming to be the Angel Of Death and requesting Tyrone to take him to Hell to which he is then asked by Tyrone "Got any luggage?"

== Cast ==
- Max Gail as Harold Oswell.
- Adam Baldwin as Albert Hockenberry.
- Mr. T as Samson.
- Charlie Barnett as Tyrone Bywater.
- Gary Busey as Dell Dorado.
- Gloria Gifford as Miss Floyd.
- Marsha Warfield as Ophelia.
- Bill Maher as Baba.
- DeWayne Jessie as Bongo.
- Paul Rodriguez as Xavier.
- Whitman Mayo as Mr. Rhythm.
- Peter Barbarian as Buddy.
- David Barbarian as Buzzy.
- Diana Bellamy as Maudie.
- John Diehl as Head Kidnapper.
- Newton D. Arnold as FBI Chief.
- Dennis Stewart as Ski Mask Hoodlum.
- Jim Moody as Arnie.
- Anne De Salvo as Myrna Oswell.
- Bob Zmuda as Cubby.
- Denise Gordy as Denise.
- Senta Moses as Ambassador's Daughter.
- José Pérez as Ernesto Bravo.
- Jill Schoelen as Claudette.
- Patricia Duff as Elegant Blonde.
- Timothy Carey as Angel Of Death.
- Ron Canada as Policeman.
- Irene Cara as Herself.
- Junk Yard Band as Themselves.

== Reception ==
D.C. Cab grossed $16,134,627 in theatres.

=== Critical response ===
D.C. Cab received negative reviews from film critics. Roger Ebert gave the film two out of four stars saying, "'D.C. Cab' is not an entirely bad movie, [but] feels like a movie with a split personality." The kidnapping plot was praised for being "fresh", while the stolen violin plot was described as "paralyzingly boring". Overall, he described it as "mindless, likable confusion". Critic Edward Sargent of The Washington Post writes in his review: "Despite its shortcomings, D.C. Cab is an hour and 40 minutes' worth of finger-popping music and gags. But viewers should remember that this low-budget film features large doses of vulgarity meant to elicit several cheap laughs".

Critic Janet Maslin of The New York Times wrote in her review: "D.C. Cab is a musical mob scene, a raucous, crowded movie that's fun as long as it stays wildly busy, and a lot less interesting when it wastes time on plot or conversation. There's a lot of talent in the large cast, and Joel Schumacher, the director, generally keeps things bustling. Mr. Schumacher was once a costume designer, which helps explain why everything here is so wildly colorful, as the characters joke around in outfits that are traffic-stopping. The movie has just the sort of bouncy, frantic, dopey humor to please the young fans of Mr. T., who is one of its stars. However, the film makers have thrown in enough R-rated material to make D.C. Cab slightly out of reach for very young audiences."

Ian Buckwalter of the Washington City Paper wrote in his review: "I'm not going to argue that D.C. Cab is a great movie, or even a good one. It wasn't a hit when it was released in December 1983, and it would probably be a stretch to even call it a cult favorite, since whatever cult exists around it is probably limited to Mr. T completists and a cadre of local film obsessives. [...] Still, by any rational measure, D.C. Cab is pretty terrible. The plot is standard '80s underdogs-strike-back fare, with the titular cab company, a gang of misfits and outcasts trying to avoid being shut down by a corrupt, power-hungry hack inspector who's in the pocket of the smug, satin jacket-wearing drivers of the Emerald Cab Company. It's basically Revenge of the Nerds with taxis. The script is ostensibly a comedy, but most of its humor is unintentional."

D.C. Cab holds an 18% rating on Rotten Tomatoes based on eleven reviews.

== Soundtrack ==
Irene Cara performed the main title theme to the film "The Dream (Hold On to Your Dream)". Gary Busey performed "Why Baby Why". The soundtrack was released in 1983.

== Release ==
D.C. Cab was released in theatres on December 16, 1983. The film was released on DVD on March 1, 2005, by Universal Studios Home Entertainment. D.C. Cab was released on the digital distribution app store Google Play. A high definition Blu-ray release by Kino Lorber was released on December 1, 2020.
