= Journey into Darkness (film) =

British TV film by Peter Sasdy and James Hill

- Genre: Thriller
- Written by: Oscar Millard; John Gould
- Directed by: Peter Sasdy; James Hill
- Presented by: Patrick McGoohan
- Starring: Robert Reed; Jennifer Hilary
- Music by: David Lindup; John Scott
- Country of origin: United Kingdom
- Original language: English

Production
- Executive producer: Joan Harrison
- Producer: Anthony Hinds
- Cinematography: Arthur Lavis; Ken Talbot
- Editors: Ronald J. Fagan; Sid Stone
- Running time: 107 minutes
- Production company: Hammer Film Productions

Original release
- Network: ABC
- Release: November 7 – November 14, 1968

Related
- Journey to the Unknown; Journey to Murder; Journey to Midnight

Journey into Darkness is a 1968 British made-for-television horror film featuring two episodes derived from the 1968–1969 anthology television series Journey to the Unknown starring Robert Reed and Jennifer Hilary, directed by Peter Sasdy and James Hill. The film contains the following episodes:

- "Paper Dolls" (original broadcast: November 7, 1968 on ABC)
- "The New People" (original broadcast: November 14, 1968 on ABC)

Patrick McGoohan is featured as host in a dark room setting who introduces the two episodes.

== Plot ==
=== "The New People" ===
A young American couple moves to New England and learns that everyone in their new neighborhood belongs to a cult which has chosen them as sacrifices. Based upon a story by Charles Beaumont.

- Director: Peter Sasdy
- Written by: Oscar Millard
- Cast: Robert Reed (Hank Prentiss), Jennifer Hilary (Anne Prentiss), Patrick Allen (Luther Ames)

=== "Paper Dolls" ===
A set of quadruplets are telepathically connected as they feel one another's pain and share skills and talents. Based upon a story by L.P. Davies.

- Director: James Hill
- Written by: John Gould
- Cast: Michael Tolan (Craig Miller), Nanette Newman (Jill Collins), Barnaby and Roderick Shaw (Richard and Rodney)
