= Be Somebody... or Be Somebody's Fool! =

- Directed by: Jeff Margolis
- Written by: Peter Elbling; Paul Raley; Paul Willson
- Produced by: Topper Carew
- Starring: Mr. T
- Production company: Big T Productions
- Distributed by: MCA Home Video
- Release date: 1984
- Running time: 52 minutes
- Country: United States
- Language: English

Be Somebody... or Be Somebody's Fool! is a 1984 motivational video hosted by American actor Mr. T and distributed by MCA Home Video.

== Synopsis ==
The video proceeds strongly from new wave and R&B culture of the mid-1980s to appeal to children to respect adults, avoid peer pressure, and build self-confidence. It features a showcase of emerging talent, including Ice-T, New Edition, Fergie (credited as "Stacy Ferguson"), Kelly Jo Minter, Martika, Janice Kawaye, Tammy Townsend, Bumper Robinson, Shanice and Valerie Landsburg. Several years later, the video has led to a proliferation of video clips that are posted on the Internet.

== Production ==
The project was produced by screenwriter Topper Carew, who had previously written and produced the film D.C. Cab, in which Mr. T also appeared.

The video was accompanied by a soundtrack album released by MCA Records and a companion book published by St. Martin's Press.

Mr. T returned to motivational roles for the 2006 reality television series I Pity the Fool.

== Segments ==
Be Somebody consists of many segments, with each delineated by a title caption at the bottom of the screen. These include:

- Shyness – A young girl (Janice Kawaye) asserts herself by using her temper.
- Roots – Mr. T says, "Ya can't know where you're going if ya don't know where you're from" and explains the symbolism of his gold chains.
- Anger – Mr. T tells children to use their anger, not to lose it, but fails to fully employ this when a fly continues to bother him.
- Frustration – Throughout the video, Mr. T tries to play the cello and finally succeeding.
- Styling – Mr. T encourages children to dress up and express themselves.
- Peer Pressure – A group of children on a dock take beer and cigarettes from the garbage, while nearby, Mr. T shakes his head and boy band New Edition sing a song disdaining peer pressure.
- Recouping – When a child trips on the sidewalk, "Dr. T" shows how one can preserve their dignity after an "absoludicrous" mistake by playing it off as a breakdancing move.
- Creating – A group of children breakdancing and encourage Mr. T to try some moves.
- Treat Your Mother Right – Mr. T raps "Treat Your Mother Right", a segment that was widely posted on the Internet between 2005 and 2006.
- Workout – Mr. T encourages lazy children at a bus stop to use a boombox as a free weight and balance a bag of popcorn on their heads.
- I Am Somebody – Mr. T raps "I Am Somebody", as well as offering a few guidelines of rap.
- Friendship – Mr. T gives his definition of "friendship", while a girl sings a song about it.
- Mr. T's Tale – Mr. T tells his version of William Shakespeare's Romeo and Juliet and gives a pro-reading message.
- Daydreaming – Mr. T explains how having dreams and goals contributes to success.
