= Journey to the Unknown (film) =

- Genre: Thriller
- Written by: Robert Heverley; Alfred Shaughnessy
- Directed by: Michael Lindsay-Hogg; Don Chaffey
- Presented by: Joan Crawford
- Starring: Vera Miles; Patty Duke
- Music by: Norman Kay; David Lindup
- Countries of origin: United Kingdom; United States
- Original language: English

Production
- Executive producers: Joan Harrison; Norman Lloyd
- Producer: Anthony Hinds
- Cinematography: Arthur Lavis; Ken Talbot
- Editor: Inman Hunter
- Running time: 86 minutes
- Production company: Hammer Film Productions

Original release
- Network: ABC
- Release: 11 February 1973

Related
- Journey into Darkness; Journey to Murder; Journey to Midnight

Journey to the Unknown is a 1973 British-American made-for-television thriller film featuring two episodes derived from the 1968–1969 anthology television series of the same name starring Vera Miles and Patty Duke, directed by Michael Lindsay-Hogg and Don Chaffey. The film contains the following episodes:

- "Matakitas is Coming" (original broadcast: November 28, 1968 on ABC)
- "The Last Visitor" (original broadcast: January 2, 1969 on ABC)

Joan Crawford is featured as hostess in a dark library setting who provides a short narration and introduces the two episodes.

== Plot ==
=== Matakitas is Coming ===
A criminologist doing research on a dead 1920s mad serial killer named Matakitas finds herself alone and trapped inside a deserted library where, 41 years earlier, he killed the librarian.

Cast

- Vera Miles as June Wiley
- Leon Lissek as Andros Matakitas
- Gay Hamilton as Sylvia Ann
- Lyn Pinkney as Tracy
- Dermot Walsh as Ken
- John Junkin as Robert

=== The Last Visitor ===
A young woman on holiday at a seaside resort hotel is stalked by a mysterious prowler which Mrs. Walker, the proprietress of the resort, informs her is her estranged, psychotic husband.

Cast

- Patty Duke as Barbara King
- Kay Walsh as Mrs. Walker
- Geoffrey Bayldon as Mr. Plimmer
- Joan Newell as Mrs. Plimmer
- Blake Butler as Butler
- John Bailey as Mitchell
- Michael Craze as Fred
- Sally James as Peggy
