= Talkin' Dirty After Dark =

1991 comedy film directed by Topper Carew

- Theatrical release poster
- Directed by: Topper Carew
- Written by: Topper Carew
- Produced by: Kevin Moreton; Patricia A. Stallone
- Starring: Martin Lawrence; Tom 'Tiny' Lister Jr. Mark Curry; John Witherspoon
- Cinematography: Misha Suslov
- Edited by: Claudia Finkle
- Music by: Matthew Ender
- Distributed by: New Line Cinema
- Release date: August 16, 1991
- Running time: 86 minutes
- Country: United States
- Language: English
- Box office: $978,775

Talkin' Dirty After Dark is a 1991 American comedy film written and directed by Topper Carew (in his feature directorial debut) and starring Martin Lawrence in his first starring role. In addition to Lawrence the film also stars John Witherspoon, Tom Lister, Jr., and Mark Curry.

The film was released in August 1991 and went on to gross less than one million dollars at the box office; it was only available in limited release. The film was generally panned by critics.

The film was shot on location in Los Angeles, California.

== Synopsis ==
Stand-up comedian, Terry Lumbar, is a local funny man who is in a lot of trouble. He can't pay his $67 phone bill. He drives a car that has only one gear, reverse. He is struggling trying to make it at a local comedy club called Dukie's. Finally, he is having an affair with the owner's wife in an attempt to get more attention at the club.

It turns out that the owner, Dukie, is trying to hook up with the star attraction of his club, Aretha, whose boyfriend threatens to hurt anybody who laughs at her. What follows is a night of comedy, romance, comedy, action, comedy, and Terry achieving his initial goal: getting $67 to pay his phone bill.

== Cast ==
- Martin Lawrence as Terry Lumbar
- Lance Crouther as Brother Kwame
- Mark Curry as Antonio
- Ken Davitian as Seat Mate
- Jedda Jones as Rubie Lin
- Renée Jones as Kimmie
- Cici Lau as Chinese Waitress
- Tommy Lister as Bigg
- Robin Montague as Bad Girl #2
- Darryl Sivad as Percy
- Toukie Smith as Waitress
- Phyllis Yvonne Stickney as Aretha
- Joe Torry as Audience Member
- Rodney Winfield as Rudy Ray
- John Witherspoon as Dukie
- Marvin Wright-Bey as Jackie, Dookies Night Club Manager
- Dwayne Kennedy as Brother Roach
