= Journey to Midnight =

- Genre: Thriller
- Written by: Jeremy Paul; Robert Bloch; William Abney
- Directed by: Roy Ward Baker; Alan Gibson
- Presented by: Sebastian Cabot
- Starring: Chad Everett; Julie Harris
- Music by: Harry Robinson
- Country of origin: United Kingdom
- Original language: English

Production
- Executive producer: Joan Harrison
- Producer: Anthony Hinds
- Cinematography: Arthur Lavis; Ken Talbot
- Editors: Ronald J. Fagan; Brian Fremantle
- Running time: 100 minutes
- Production companies: Hammer Film Productions; 20th Century Fox Television

Original release
- Network: Syndication
- Release: 31 October 1971

Related
- Journey to Murder; Journey to the Unknown; Journey into Darkness

Journey to Midnight is a 1971 British made-for-television horror film featuring two episodes derived from the 1968–1969 anthology television series Journey to the Unknown starring Chad Everett and Julie Harris, directed by Roy Ward Baker and Alan Gibson. The film contains the following episodes:

- "The Indian Spirit Guide" (original broadcast: 10 October 1968 on ABC)
- "Poor Butterfly" (original broadcast: 9 January 1969 on ABC)

Sebastian Cabot is featured as host who introduces the two episodes. Joan Crawford was also due to appear as co-host, but her scenes were ultimately cut. Her segments appeared in the 1970 television film Journey to the Unknown.

== Plot ==
=== "Poor Butterfly" ===
Directed by Alan Gibson, the first segment features Chad Everett as a man who receives an invitation to a costume party and has no idea why he got the invitation. When he arrives at the party, everyone is dressed like it's the 1920s and they act like it is too. Based on a story by William Abney.

Cast

- Chad Everett as Steven Miller
- Bernard Lee as Ben Loker
- Fay Compton as Queen Victoria

=== "The Indian Spirit Guide" ===
Directed by Roy Ward Baker, the second segment features Julie Harris as a wealthy widow who hires a private investigator to protect her from the phony spiritualists she encounters as she seeks out a real one to contact her late husband. Based on a story by Robert Bloch.

Cast

- Julie Harris as Leona Gillings
- Tom Adams as Jerry Crown
- Tracy Reed as Joyce
