= Mr. T =

American actor and professional wrestler (born 1952)

- Mr. T in 2026
- Born: Laurence Tureaud; May 21, 1952 (age 74); Chicago, Illinois, U.S.
- Occupations: Actor; wrestler; television personality
- Years active: 1980–present
- Professional wrestling career
- Ring name: Mr. T
- Billed height: 5 ft 10 in (178 cm)
- Billed weight: 236 lb (107 kg)
- Debut: March 24, 1985
- Retired: December 27, 1994

Laurence T (born Laurence Tureaud, May 21, 1952, and known professionally as Mr. T) is an American actor and retired professional wrestler. He is known for his roles as B. A. Baracus in the 1980s television series The A-Team and as boxer Clubber Lang in the 1982 film Rocky III. He is also known for his distinctive hairstyle inspired by Mandinka warriors in West Africa, his copious gold jewelry, his tough-guy persona and his catchphrase "I pity the fool!", first uttered as Clubber Lang in Rocky III, then turned into a trademark used in slogans or titles, like the 2006 reality show I Pity the Fool.

== Early life, family and education ==
Tureaud was born in Chicago, Illinois, the youngest son in a family with twelve children. He and his four sisters and seven brothers grew up in a three-room apartment in the Robert Taylor Homes public housing. His father, Nathaniel Tureaud, was a minister. After his father left when Lawrence was five years old, he shortened his name to Lawrence Tero. In 1970, he legally changed his last name to T. His new name, Mr. T, was based upon his childhood impressions regarding the lack of respect from white people for his family. T recalls:

I think about my father being called "boy", my uncle being called "boy", my brother, coming back from Vietnam and being called "boy". So I questioned myself: "What does a black man have to do before he's given respect as a man?" So when I was 18 years old, when I was old enough to fight and die for my country, old enough to drink, old enough to vote, I said I was old enough to be called a man. I self-ordained myself Mr. T, so the first word out of everybody's mouth is "Mr."

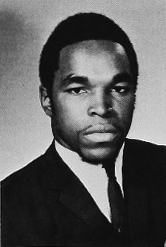
Tureaud as a senior in high school (1970)

Tureaud attended Dunbar Vocational High School, where he was on the school's football and wrestling teams. He also studied martial arts. During high school, he was the citywide wrestling champion two years in a row.

He won a football scholarship to Prairie View A&M University, where he majored in mathematics. He was expelled, along with some 200 other students, for protesting the expulsion of the student newspaper editor who had broken the female-only curfew by leaving campus for the weekend to attend Mardi Gras.

== Early career ==
After Mr. T left Prairie View A&M, he worked as a gym instructor for a government program in Chicago. He later said it was here that he discovered a gift for helping children. Thereafter, he enlisted in the United States Army in 1975 and served in the Military Police Corps. After his discharge in the late 1970s, he tried out for the Green Bay Packers of the National Football League, but failed to make the team owing to a knee injury.

Mr. T worked as a bouncer at the Rush Street night club Dingbats Discotheque. It was at this time that he created the persona of Mr. T. He began wearing gold neck chains and other jewelry as a result of customers losing the items or leaving them behind at the night club after a fight. A banned customer, or one reluctant to risk a confrontation by going back inside, could return to claim his property from Mr. T who would wear it conspicuously in front of the establishment. Along with controlling the violence as a doorman, Mr. T was mainly hired to keep out drug dealers and users. Mr. T has claimed that as a bouncer, he was in over 200 fights and was sued a number of times, but won each case.

He eventually parlayed his job as a bouncer into a career as a bodyguard that lasted almost ten years. As his reputation grew, he was contracted to guard, among others, clothes designers, models, judges, politicians, athletes and millionaires. His clients included celebrities Steve McQueen, Michael Jackson, LeVar Burton, and Diana Ross, and boxers Muhammad Ali, Joe Frazier, and Leon Spinks. With his reputation as Mr. T, he attracted strange offers and was frequently approached with odd commissions, including tracking runaway teenagers, locating missing persons, debt collection, and assassination requests.

While he was in his late twenties, Mr. T won two tough-man competitions consecutively. The first aired as Sunday Games on NBC-TV under the contest of "America's Toughest Bouncer" which included throwing a 150-pound (68 kg) stuntman, and breaking through a 4-inch (10 cm) wooden door. For the first event, Mr. T came in third place. For the end, two finalists squared off in a boxing ring for a two-minute round to declare the champion. Making it to the ring as a finalist, he had as his opponent a 280-pound (130 kg) Honolulu bouncer, Tutefano Tufi. Within twenty seconds Mr. T gave the 6 ft 5 in (1.96 m) Tufi a bloody nose, and later a bloody mouth. Mr. T won the match and thus the competition. The second competition was aired under a new name, Games People Play, on NBC-TV. When interviewed by Bryant Gumbel before the final boxing match, Mr T. said, "I just feel sorry for the guy who I have to box. I just feel real sorry for him." This fight was scheduled to last three rounds, but Mr. T finished it in less than 54 seconds. The line, "I don't hate him but... I pity the fool" in the movie Rocky III was written by Sylvester Stallone, who is reputed to have been inspired by the interview.

== Acting roles and other work ==
While reading National Geographic, Mr. T first noticed the hairstyle for which he is now famous, on a Mandinka warrior. He decided that adoption of the style would be a powerful statement about his African origin. It was a simpler, safer, and more permanent visual signature than his gold chains, rings, and bracelets.

In 1980, Mr. T was spotted by Sylvester Stallone while taking part in NBC's "America's Toughest Bouncer" competition, a segment of NBC's Games People Play. Although his role in Rocky III was originally intended as just a few lines, Mr. T was eventually cast as Clubber Lang, the primary antagonist. His catchphrase "I pity the fool!" comes from the film; when asked if he hates Rocky, Lang replies, "No, I don't hate Balboa, but I pity the fool." He subsequently appeared in another boxing film, Penitentiary 2, and on an episode of the Canadian sketch comedy series Bizarre, where he fights and eats Super Dave Osborne, before accepting a television series role on The A-Team. He appeared in an episode of the NBC sitcom Silver Spoons, reprising his old role as bodyguard to the character Ricky Stratton (played by Ricky Schroder).

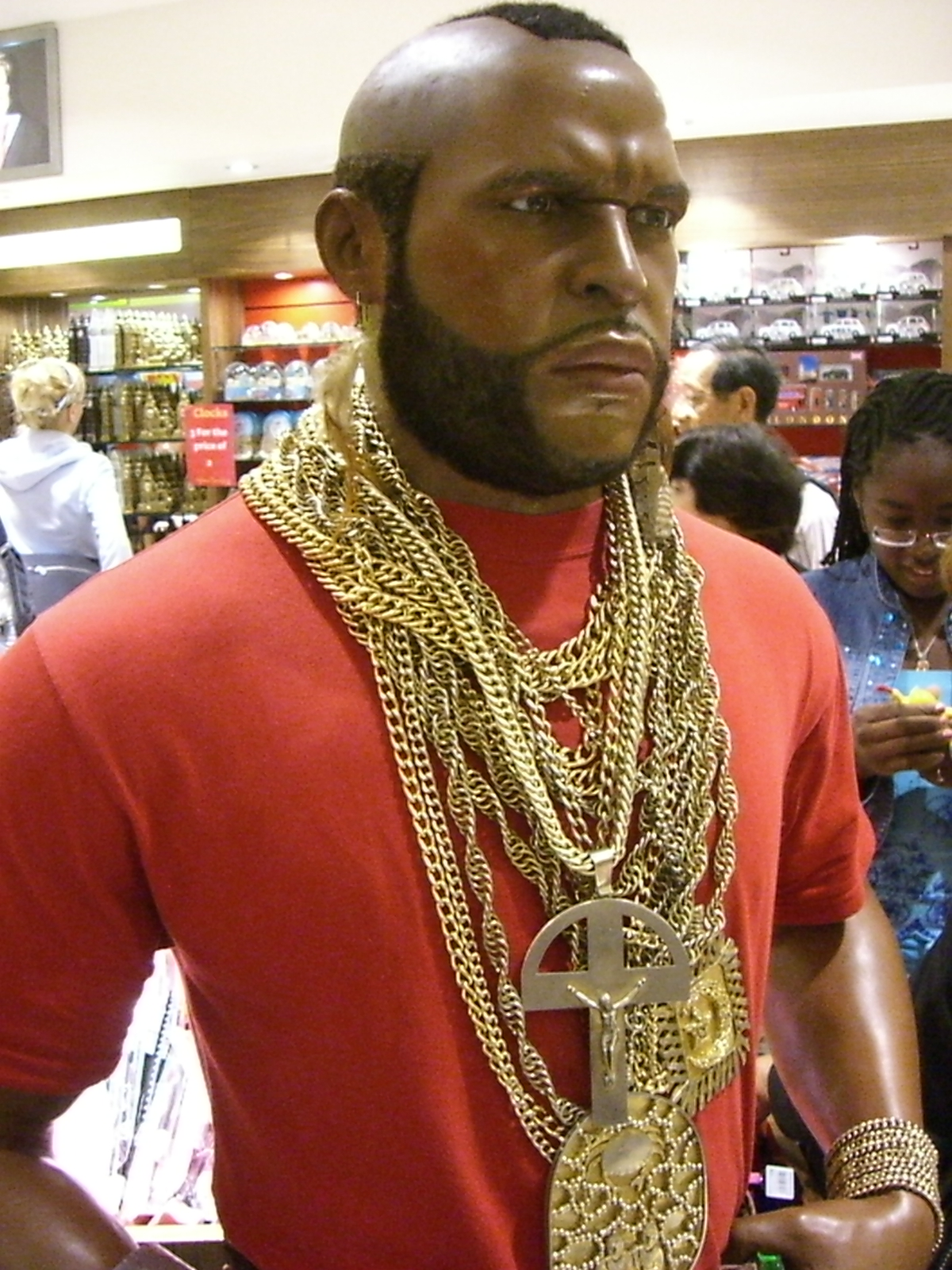
Waxwork of Mr. T as B. A. Baracus from The A-Team at Madame Tussauds, London

In The A-Team, he played Sergeant Bosco "B. A." Baracus, an ex-Army commando on the run with three other members from the United States government "for a crime they didn't commit." As well as the team's tough guy, B. A. was a mechanical genius, but afraid of flying. When asked at a press conference whether he was as stupid as B. A. Baracus, Mr. T observed quietly, "It takes a smart guy to play dumb." The series was a major hit, and B. A. Baracus in particular quickly became a cult character and the de facto star of the show, reportedly sparking tensions with seasoned actor George Peppard, although Mr. T always maintained that these were unfounded rumors. Mr. T was reported to be earning $80,000 a week for his role in The A-Team.

His role in The A-Team led to him making an appearance in the sitcom Diff'rent Strokes in the sixth season opener "Mr. T and Mr. t" (1983), in which an episode of The A-Team is supposedly filmed in the family's penthouse apartment.

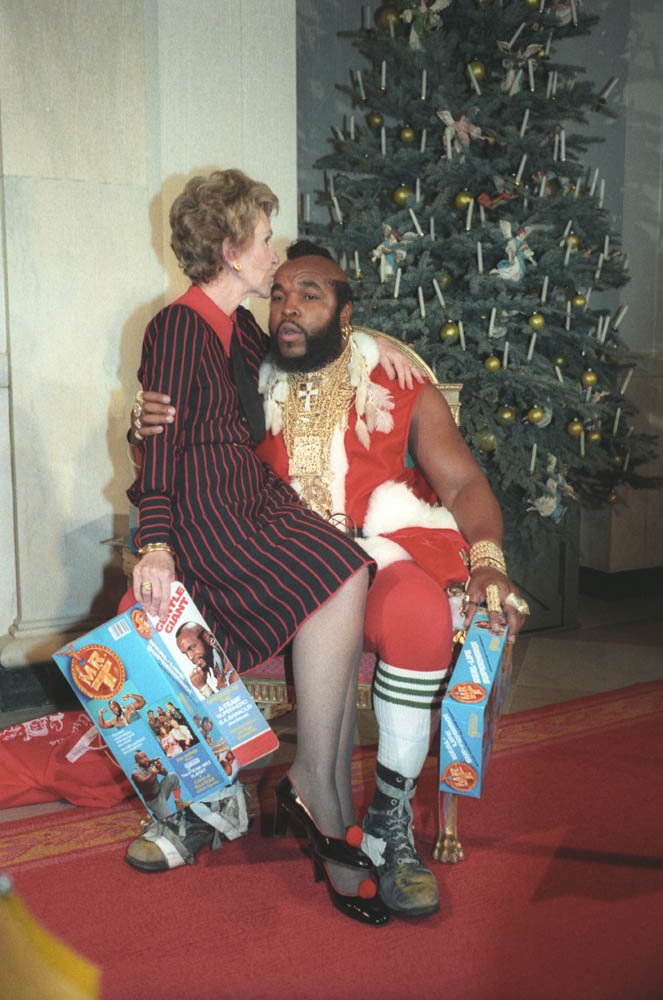
Mr. T portraying Santa Claus at the White House with First Lady Nancy Reagan in 1983

Also in 1983, a Ruby-Spears-produced cartoon called Mister T premiered on NBC. The Mister T cartoon starred Mr. T as his alter ego, the owner of a gym where a group of gymnasts trained. He helped them with their training, but they also helped him solve mysteries and fight crime in Scooby-Doo-style scenarios; thirty episodes were produced. Each episode was bookended by Mr. T himself, presenting the theme of the episode, and then a closing statement on a lesson for children, based on the events of the episode.

The only feature film that can be called a Mr. T vehicle, DC Cab, was also released in 1983. It features an ensemble cast, many of whom were publicized figures from other areas of show business: comics Paul Rodriguez, Marsha Warfield, singer Irene Cara, bodybuilders David and Peter Paul (the "Barbarian Brothers")—but who had only modest acting experience. Despite the wide range of performers, and more seasoned actors such as Adam Baldwin as the protagonist Albert, as well as Gary Busey and Max Gail, Mr. T was top billed and the central figure in the film's publicity, with him literally towering over the other characters on the film's poster. While the film, featuring the ensemble as a ragtag taxi company trying to hustle their way to solvency and respectability, performed modestly at the box office, its $16 million take exceeded its $12 million budget, it received mixed reviews critically. Janet Maslin, writing for The New York Times, described it as "a musical mob scene, a raucous, crowded movie that's fun as long as it stays wildly busy, and a lot less interesting when it wastes time on plot or conversation." Roger Ebert praised the movie's "mindless, likable confusion" and criticized its "fresh off the assembly line" plot. It was the second feature for prolific director Joel Schumacher.

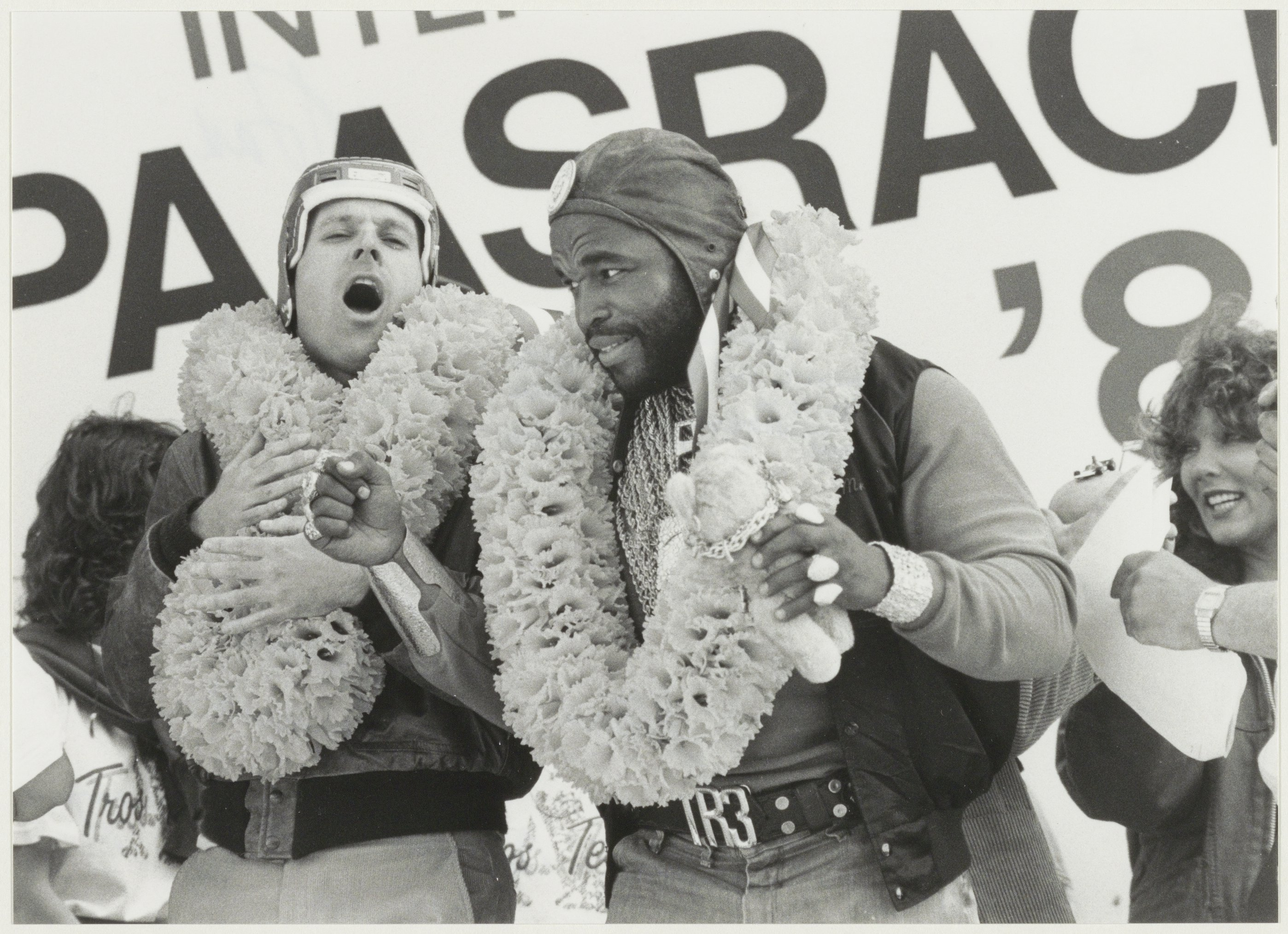
Mr. T on Zandvoort racing track in 1984

In 1984, Mr. T made a motivational video, Be Somebody... or Be Somebody's Fool! He gives helpful advice to children throughout the video; for example, he teaches them how to understand and appreciate their origins, how to dress fashionably without buying designer labels, how to make tripping up look like breakdancing, how to control their anger, and how to deal with peer pressure. The video is roughly one hour long, but contains 30 minutes of singing, either by the group of children accompanying him, or by Mr. T himself. He sings "Treat Your Mother Right (Treat Her Right)", and also raps a song about growing up in the ghetto and praising God. The raps in this video were written by Ice-T. Due to its unintentionally comic nature, many clips have been made from this video and shared as Internet memes. Also in 1984, he played the protagonist of the TV movie The Toughest Man in the World, as Bruise Brubaker, a bouncer also leading a sports center for teenagers, who takes part in a strong man championship to get funds for the center. He also released a rap mini-album, Mr. T's Commandments (Columbia/CBS Records) the same year. It features seven songs, including the title theme for the aforementioned TV film. In much the same tone as his motivational video, it instructed children to stay in school and to stay away from drugs. He followed it up the same year with a second album, titled Mr. T's Be Somebody... or Be Somebody's Fool! (MCA), featuring music from the eponymous film.

During those busy years, he made numerous appearances in television shows, most notably hosting the 15th episode of the 10th season of Saturday Night Live, along with Hulk Hogan, both of whom were featured in Rocky III. Mr. T had previously appeared on Saturday Night Live (season 8) in October 1982, fresh from his role in Rocky III, in a recurring skit by Eddie Murphy called "Mr. Robinson Neighborhood" (making a reference to one of his lines in the movie : "Hello boys and girls. The new word for today... is PAIN.").

On January 19, 1985, he introduced Rich Little at the nationally televised 50th Presidential Inaugural Gala, the day before the second inauguration of Ronald Reagan.

In 1988, after the cancellation of The A-Team, Mr. T starred in the syndicated Canadian television series T. and T. Earning $15,000 for personal appearances, by the end of the 1990s, he was appearing only in the occasional commercial, largely because of health problems.

Some time during the 1990s, Mr. T would be in Eric "Butterbean" Esch's corner in the boxing matches during one of the Toughman Contests. He has frequently appeared on the TBN Christian television network.

In 2002, Mr. T appeared as a bartender in the video for "Pass the Courvoisier, Part II" by Busta Rhymes featuring Sean Combs and Pharrell Williams. In the 2009 animated film Cloudy with a Chance of Meatballs, Mr. T provided the voice for Officer Earl Devereaux, the town's athletic cop who loves his son very much. Mr. T was offered a cameo appearance in the film adaptation of The A-Team, but he declined, whereas Dwight Schultz and Dirk Benedict both made cameos in the film. These scenes were shown after the credits, but were reinserted during the film in the Extended Cut. Although he was not disturbed at the mere prospect of an A-Team film being made without him, he strongly criticized the concept of having another actor copy his own very distinct appearance and style (including his haircut and gold chains) in the hope of attracting his nostalgic fanbase, and considered that asking him to do a cameo appearance in those conditions was disrespectful.

Starting in 2011, Mr. T presented a clip show on BBC Three named World's Craziest Fools. The show featured stories such as botched bank robberies and inept insurance fraudsters alongside fail videos. In 2015, it was announced that Mr. T would star in a do it yourself home improvement TV show, with interior designer Tiffany Brooks, on the DIY Network. The show, due sometime in 2015, was to be titled, I Pity the Tool, as comical wordplay on his famous catchphrase, but only one episode was aired, for unknown reasons.

On March 1, 2017, Mr. T was revealed as one of the contestants who would compete on season 24 of Dancing with the Stars. He was paired with professional dancer Kym Herjavec. On April 10, 2017, Mr. T and Herjavec were the third couple to be eliminated from the competition, finishing in 10th place. He vowed to donate the money received from this participation to the Saint Jude Children's Research Hospital and the Shriners Hospitals for Children.

=== Commercials ===
Mr. T has appeared in numerous TV commercials, including for Snickers, Atari, World of Warcraft, MCI, Comcast and RadioShack. Forbes described him as "one of the most enduring pitchmen in the business". Mr. T has described himself as "not really an actor, I'm a reactor; I'm a pitchman." At his peak, he was earning $5 million per year.

Mr. T performed in a video campaign for Hitachi Data Systems (HDS) that was created and posted on consumer video sites including YouTube and Yahoo! Video. According to Steven Zivanic, senior director and corporate communications of HDS, "this campaign has not only helped the firm in its own area, but it has given the data storage firm a broader audience." In November 2007, Mr. T appeared in a television commercial for the online role playing game World of Warcraft with the phrase "I'm Mr. T and I'm a Night Elf Mohawk". A follow-up to this commercial appeared in November 2009 where he appeared promoting the "mohawk grenade" item, which appears in game and turns other players into Mr. T's likeness.

In 2008, Mr. T appeared on the American channel Shopping TV, selling his Mr. T Flavorwave Oven. In 2009, ZootFly announced they had acquired the rights to the Mr. T Graphic Novel and were planning several video games based upon the work. The first (and only) game, Mr. T: The Videogame, was to have Mr. T battle Nazis in various locations and guest star Wil Wright. It was planned to be available on the Xbox 360, PS3, Wii and PC platforms, however the game was canceled for undisclosed reasons.

The same year, he appeared on commercials in the UK, Ireland, Australia, and New Zealand advertising the candy bar Snickers with the slogan "Get Some Nuts!" One of these commercials featured Mr. T on an army jeep calling a speed walker wearing yellow shorts "a disgrace to the man race" (a pun on the double meaning of the word "race") and firing Snickers bars at the man with a custom-made machine gun so that he starts "running like a real man". This commercial was pulled by Mars following a complaint by the US-based group Human Rights Campaign, although the advert had never been shown in the US. The group alleged that the commercial promoted the idea that violence against gay, lesbian, bisexual and transgender people "is not only acceptable, but humorous". Mr. T distanced himself from these accusations, insisting that he would never lend his name to such beliefs, and that he did not think the commercial was offensive to anyone, as all the commercials he appeared in had a similarly silly, over-the-top nature and were never intended to be taken seriously.

In 2010, Mr. T signed up as the spokesman for Gold Promise, a gold-buying company. According to an appraiser hired by Bloomberg Television's Taking Stock, his trademark gold jewelry was worth around $43,000 in 1983, although some sources claim the gold jewelry was worth up to $300,000.

In 2015, he starred in a series of Fuze Iced Tea advertisements, stating, "The only thing bolder than Fuze Iced Tea is ME!" The brand, owned by The Coca-Cola Company, also briefly centered its social profiles and website around Mr. T.

== Professional wrestling ==
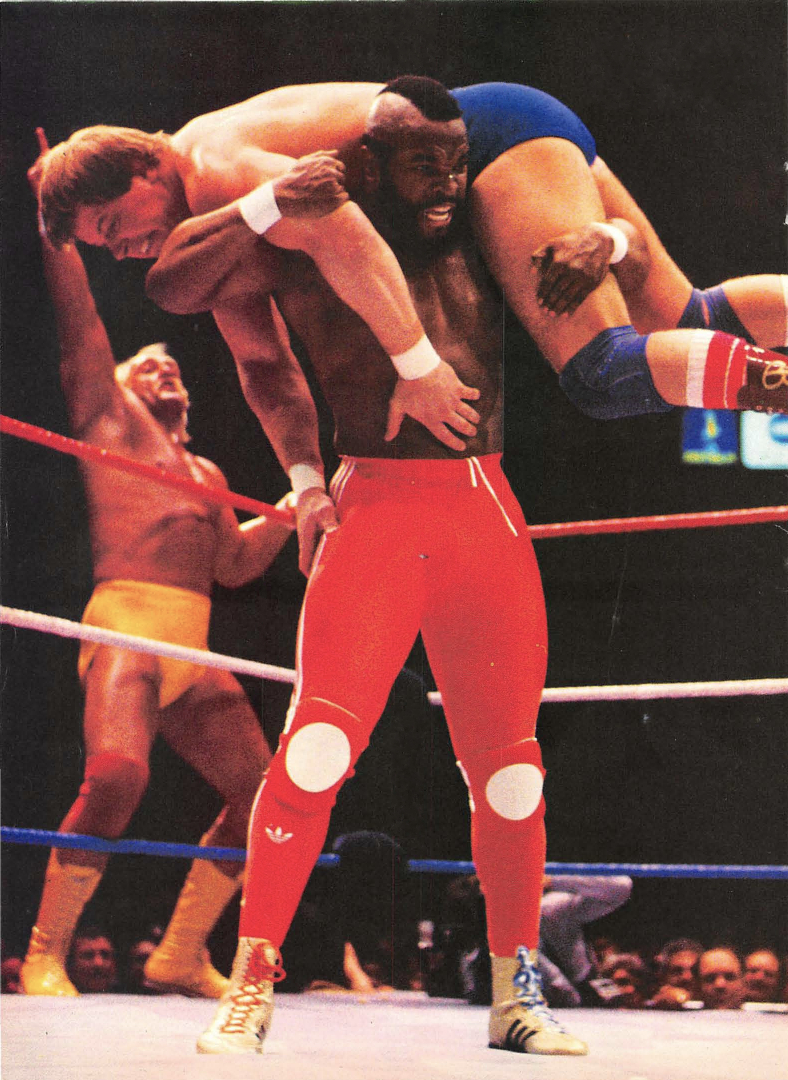
Mr. T hoists Roddy Piper up onto his shoulders as Hulk Hogan cheers in the background during the main event of the first-ever Wrestlemania

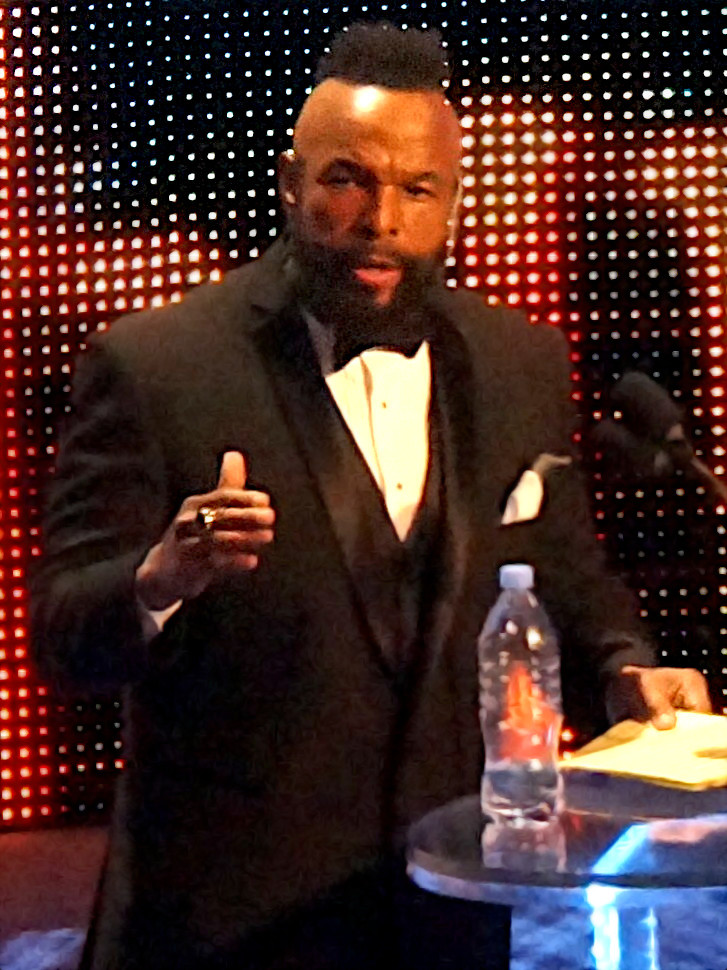
Mr. T at the WWE Hall of Fame in 2014

=== World Wrestling Federation (1985–1987) ===
Mr. T entered the world of professional wrestling in 1985. He was Hulk Hogan's tag-team partner at the World Wrestling Federation's (WWF) WrestleMania I, a match they won. Hulk Hogan wrote in his autobiography that Mr. T saved the main event of WrestleMania I between them and "Rowdy" Roddy Piper and "Mr. Wonderful" Paul Orndorff because when he arrived, security would not let his entourage into the building. Mr. T was ready to skip the show until Hogan personally talked him out of leaving. Piper said he and fellow wrestlers disliked Mr. T because he was an actor and had never paid his dues as a professional wrestler. Remaining with the WWF, Mr. T became a special "WWF boxer" in light of his character in Rocky III. He took on "Cowboy" Bob Orton on the March 1, 1986, Saturday Night's Main Event V, on NBC. This boxing stunt culminated in another boxing match against Roddy Piper at WrestleMania 2. As part of the build-up for the match, Piper attacked Mr. T's friend, dwarf wrestler the Haiti Kid on his Piper's Pit interview slot, shaving his head into a mohican style similar to that of Mr. T. Then Mr. T won the boxing match in Round 4 by disqualification after Piper attacked the referee and bodyslammed Mr. T. He returned to the World Wrestling Federation as a special guest referee in 1987 and a special referee enforcer confronting such stars as The Honky Tonk Man.

=== World Class Championship Wrestling (1989) ===
On July 21, 1989, Mr. T. made an appearance in World Class Championship Wrestling (WCCW), seconding Kerry Von Erich.

=== World Championship Wrestling (1994) ===
Five years later, Mr. T reappeared in WCW, first appearing in Hulk Hogan's corner for his WCW world title match against Ric Flair at Bash at the Beach 1994. He would next appear as a special referee for the Hogan–Flair rematch in October 1994 at Halloween Havoc, and then went on to wrestle again, defeating Kevin Sullivan at Starrcade '94: Triple Threat.

=== Sporadic appearances (2001–present) ===
Another seven years later, Mr. T appeared in the front row of the November 19, 2001, episode of WWF Raw. On April 5, 2014, at the Smoothie King Center in New Orleans, Mr. T was inducted by Gene Okerlund into the WWE Hall of Fame's celebrity wing. His acceptance speech, largely a tribute to his mother and motherhood rather than wrestling, ran long and was eventually interrupted by Kane.

== Curling ==
Mr. T is an enthusiastic supporter of curling, having supported the US Olympic team in 2018 and 2022.

== Personal life ==
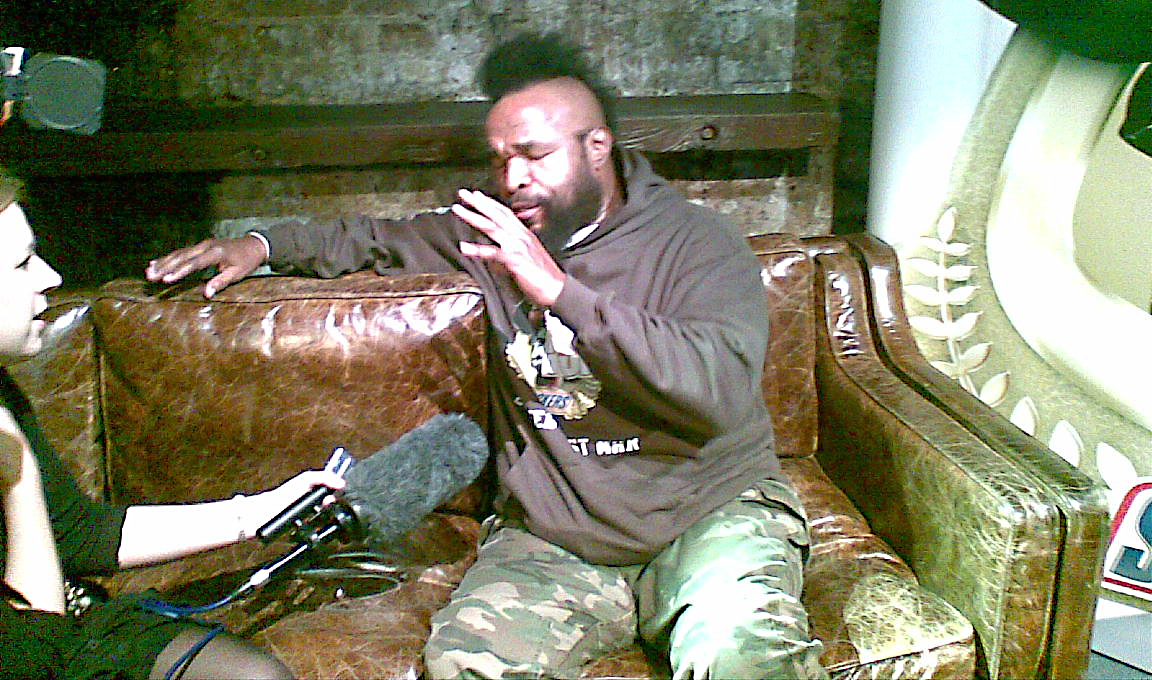
Mr. T during an interview in London in 2009

Mr. T is a born-again Christian. Mr. T married Phyllis Clarke in 1971. They have three children together, two daughters and a son. One of their daughters, Erika Clarke, is a comedian. They divorced in the 1980s.

Mr. T was sued by a man in 2014 saying that he was also Mr. T's son from outside his marriage. The lawsuit was dismissed in August 2014 due to the man's failure to pay the required fees.

In 1987, he angered the residents of Lake Forest, Illinois, by cutting down more than 100 oak trees on his estate. The local newspaper referred to the incident as "the Lake Forest Chain Saw Massacre".

In 1995, he was diagnosed with a cutaneous T-cell lymphoma, or mycosis fungoides. Once in remission, he joked about the coincidence: "Can you imagine that? Cancer with my name on it – personalized cancer!" He wrote an as-yet-unpublished book on this experience, called Cancer Saved My Life (Cancer Ain't for No Wimps). He made a direct reference to it as he performed a waltz to the song "Amazing Grace" in Dancing with the Stars.

He stopped wearing virtually all his gold, one of his identifying marks, after helping with the cleanup after Hurricane Katrina in 2005. He said, "As a Christian, when I saw other people lose their lives and lose their land and property ... I felt that it would be a sin before God for me to continue wearing my gold. I felt it would be insensitive and disrespectful to the people who lost everything, so I stopped wearing my gold."

Mr. T often refers to himself in the third person. He also frequently talks in rhymes. He cites Muhammad Ali as his "childhood hero" and his main inspiration with regard to style and mannerisms.

== Filmography ==
=== Film ===
Year	Title	Role	Notes
1980	The Blues Brothers	Guy on the Street	Uncredited
1982	Penitentiary II	Himself	
1982	Rocky III	Clubber Lang	
1983	D.C. Cab	Samson	
1984	Be Somebody... or Be Somebody's Fool!		
1985	Rocky IV	Clubber Lang	Archival footage
1985	WrestleMania	Himself	Video
1986	WrestleMania 2	Himself	Video
1993	Freaked	The Bearded Lady	
1994	Magic of the Golden Bear: Goldy III	Freedom	
1994	Bash at the Beach	Himself	Video
1994	Halloween Havoc	Himself	Video
1994	Starrcade	Himself	Video
1995	Battlecade Extreme Fighting	Himself	Video
1996	Spy Hard	Helicopter Pilot	
1999	Inspector Gadget	Himself	
2001	Not Another Teen Movie	The Wise Janitor	
2001	Judgment	J. T. Quincy	
2009	Cloudy with a Chance of Meatballs	Earl Devereaux	Voice role
2014	WrestleMania XXX	Himself	Video

=== Television ===
Year	Title	Role	Notes
1981	Games People Play	Himself	Episode: "America's Best Bouncer"
1982	Twilight Theater	Himself	
1982	Silver Spoons	Himself	Episode: "Me and Mr. T"
1982–1984	Saturday Night Live	Himself	2 episodes
1983–1987	The A-Team	B. A. Baracus	97 episodes
1983	Diff'rent Strokes	Himself	Episode: "Mr. T and Mr. t"
1983	Alvin and the Chipmunks	Himself	Episode: "The C Team"
1983	Bizaree	Himself	
1983–1985	Mister T	Himself	30 episodes
1984	The Toughest Man in the World	Bruise Brubaker	TV movie
1984	Dean Martin Celebrity Roast	Himself	Special
1984–1988	WWF Superstars of Wrestling	Himself	
1984	A Christmas Dream	Benny / Santa Claus	TV movie
1985	Back to Next Saturday	Himself	TV movie
1986	Saturday Night's Main Event V	Himself	TV special
1987	Alice Through the Looking Glass	Jabberwock	TV movie
1988–1990	T. and T.	T. S. Turner	65 episodes
1989	World Class Championship Wrestling	Himself	Episode: July 21, 1989
1990	Straight Line	T.S. Turner	
1991	Out of This World	Himself	Episode: "New Kid on the Block"
1994	Blossom	Himself	Episode: "A Little Help from My Friends"
1994–1995	Eek! The Cat	Mr. T-Rex	3 episodes
1995	Kids Against Crime	Himself	TBN
1996	Martin	Mr. Jenkins	Episode: "Boo's in the House"
1996–1997	Suddenly Susan	Arnie	2 episodes
1999	Malcolm & Eddie	Calvin	Episode: "The Wrongest Yard"
1999	Sabrina: The Animated Series	Alien	3 episodes
2001	WWF Raw	Himself	Episode: November 19, 2001
2003	House of Mouse	Himself	Episode: "House Ghosts"
2004	Johnny Bravo	Himself	Episode: "T is for Trouble"
2004	The Simpsons	Himself	Episode: "Today I Am a Clown"
2006	I Pity the Fool	Himself	6 episodes
2010	Finders Keepers	Gambler	Episode: "Casino Night"
2011–2013	World's Craziest Fools	Himself	BBC Three
2014	The Comeback Kids	Himself	Episode: "Gary's Big Break"
2017	Dancing with the Stars	Himself	Season 24
2026	Untold Mr T: I Pity the Fool	Himself	Netflix documentary

=== Other ===
Year	Title	Role	Notes
2003	Celebrity Deathmatch	Himself	Video game
2011	Cloudy with a Chance of Meatballs: The 4D Experience	Earl Devereaux	Theme park ride
2022	WWE 2K22	Himself	Video game

== Discography ==
=== Albums ===
- Mr. T's Commandments (1984), Columbia
- Be Somebody (Or Be Somebody's Fool) (1984), MCA

=== Singles ===
- "Mr. T's Commandment" (1984)
- "Don't Talk to Strangers" (1984)
- "Treat Your Mother Right" (1984)

== See also ==
- Mr. T Cereal

== Bibliography ==
- Mr. T (1985). Mr. T: The Man with the Gold: An Autobiography (1st ed.). St. Martin's Press. ISBN 9780312550899.
