= The Woman in White (1966 TV series) =

- Genre: Mystery
- Based on: The Woman in White by Wilkie Collins
- Written by: Michael Voysey
- Directed by: Brandon Acton-Bond
- Starring: Alethea Charlton; Jennifer Hilary; Nicholas Pennell
- Country of origin: United Kingdom
- Original language: English
- No. of series: 1
- No. of episodes: 6 (all missing)

Production
- Producer: David Conroy
- Running time: 25 minutes (per episode)
- Production company: BBC

Original release
- Network: BBC One
- Release: 2 October – 6 November 1966

The Woman in White is a British drama television series that originally aired on BBC 1 in six 25-minute-long episodes between 2 October and 6 November 1966. It was adapted from the 1860 novel The Woman in White by Wilkie Collins.

As of 2021, none of the six episodes are known to exist in the BBC archives.

== Plot summary ==
In Victorian England, young artist and drawing master Walter Hartright encounters a distressed woman dressed entirely in white one night; she appears frightened and cryptic, and Hartright later learns she has escaped from an asylum. web|url=https://genome.ch.bbc.co.uk

Soon after, Hartright takes up a position teaching art to two half-sisters, Laura Fairlie and Marian Halcombe, at Limmeridge House in Cumberland. There, he notices that Laura bears a striking resemblance to the mysterious woman in white — a similarity that hints at deeper secrets and connections between the women. web|url=https://genome.ch.bbc.co.uk

As Hartright becomes drawn into the Fairlie household’s affairs, Laura’s engagement to the ambitious Sir Percival Glyde and the suspicious behaviour of his associate Count Fosco begin to suggest a sinister plot aimed at depriving Laura of her inheritance. Although details of individual episodes are largely undocumented due to the loss of the recordings, contemporary TV listings show the adaptation follows the novel’s structure of escalating mystery and danger surrounding identity, deception, and legal conspiracy as Hartright and Marian investigate the truth behind the “woman in white” and Glyde’s intentions. web|url=https://genome.ch.bbc.co.uk

== Main cast ==
- Alethea Charlton as Marian Halcombe
- Jennifer Hilary as Laura Fairlie
- Louis Mansi as Professor Pesca
- Nicholas Pennell as Walter Hartright
- John Barron as Sir Percival Glyde
- Geoffrey Bayldon as Mr Fairlie
- Francis de Wolff as Count Fosco
- Alan Collins as Louis
- Daphne Heard as Madame Fosco
- Anne Dyson as Mrs Michelson
- David Langford as Matthews
- Katherine Parr as Mrs Catherick
- Elsie Wagstaff as Mrs Clements
