= Tammy Townsend =

American actress and singer

- Born: August 17, 1970 (age 56); Los Angeles, California, U.S.
- Occupations: Actress, singer
- Years active: 1984–present

Tammy Townsend (born August 17, 1970) is an American actress and singer. Townsend is best known for her roles as Wendy Reardon on the NBC daytime soap opera Days of Our Lives (1994–96), and Greta McClure, Eddie's girlfriend on the ABC/CBS sitcom Family Matters (1995–98). From 2015 to 2018, she starred as Kira Cooper, the mother of K.C. Cooper, on the Disney Channel series K.C. Undercover.

== Early life ==
Townsend was born in Los Angeles, California. Her mother is African, and her father is of English and Yugoslavian ancestry.

== Career ==
Townsend began her acting career in 1984, appearing in the video "Be Somebody... or Be Somebody's Fool!". She appeared in episodes of television sitcoms such as Diff'rent Strokes and Charles in Charge. From 1994 to 1996, she played Wendy Reardon on the NBC daytime soap opera Days of Our Lives. From 1995 to 1998, Townsend played the recurring role of Greta McClure in the ABC sitcom Family Matters. In 1997, she played the female leading role in the comedy film The Pest starring John Leguizamo. She has played guest-starring roles in Quantum Leap,In The Heat of The Night, Living Single, The Practice, Felicity, Walker, Texas Ranger, Friends, and CSI: Crime Scene Investigation. Townsend again appeared in a recurring role on the short-lived UPN sitcom Grown Ups with Family Matters star Jaleel White.

Townsend was a regular cast member on the short-lived sitcoms Rock Me, Baby (2003–04) and Sherri (2009). She also played recurring roles on Lincoln Heights, Switched at Birth, and The Client List. In 2015, Townsend began starring as Kira Cooper, the mother of Zendaya's lead character, on the Disney Channel sitcom K.C. Undercover.

== Filmography ==
=== Film ===
Year	Film	Role	Notes
1984	Be Somebody... or Be Somebody's Fool!	Herself	Video
1991	The Five Heartbeats	Matthews’ Kids	
1995	The Brady Bunch Movie	Danielle	
1995	Divas	Lynette	TV movie
1997	The Pest	Xantha Kent	
2000	Playing Mona Lisa	Alice	
2003	Love Chronicles	Asia	
2005	The Fabric of a Man	Domunique Majors	Video
2005	Good Vibrations	Tiffany	Short
2005	Hollywood Horror	Robyn	
2010	Preacher's Kid	Desiree	
2010	Love Me or Leave Me	Dominique Adams	TV movie
2010	My Girlfriend's Back	Vanessa	
2012	To Love and to Cherish	Jasmine	TV movie
2012	Love Overboard	Patrice	Video
2012	The Mistle-Tones	Grace	TV movie
2014	Daddy's Home	-	TV movie
2015	If Not for His Grace	Ruth Randolph	
2015	Zodiac Sign	Victoria	
2016	Boy Bye	Beverly	
2018	It's a Date	Anastasia Reese	
2018	One Crazy Christmas	Sabrina	
2019	The Workout Room	Xena	
2021	A Jenkins Family Christmas	Brianna	

=== Television ===
Year	Title	Role	Notes
1985	Diff'rent Strokes	Sara	Episode: "Beauty Is in the Eye of Arnold"
1987	Charles in Charge	Tammy	Episode: "Baby Doll"
1988	The Bronx Zoo	Aimee	Episode: "Behind Closed Doors"
1989	TV 101	Student	Episode: "Kangaroo Gate"
1991	Family Matters	Jenny	Episode: "The Love God"
1992	Quantum Leap	Lynell Walters	Episode: "A Song for the Soul - April 7, 1963"
1993	Where I Live	Dontay	Recurring Cast: Season 1
1994	In the Heat of the Night	Chelsea Clark	Episode: "A Matter of Justice"
1994–96	Days of Our Lives	Wendy Reardon	Regular Cast
1995	Hangin' with Mr. Cooper	Patrice	Episode: "The Ringer"
1995	On Our Own	Loretta	Episode: "The Easy Way"
1995	Living Single	Melody	Episode: "The Ex-File"
1995–98	Family Matters	Greta McClure	Guest: Season 6, Recurring Cast: Season 7-9
1996	The Wayans Bros.	Amy	Episode: "Getting It"
1997	The Practice	Rachel Reynolds	Episode: "Pilot"
1998	Guys Like Us	Bridget Cole	Recurring Cast
1999	Felicity	Tara Owens	Episode: "Friends"
1999	Time of Your Life	Casey House	Episode: "The Time They Had Not"
1999–00	Grown Ups	Melissa	Recurring Cast
2000–01	Walker, Texas Ranger	Erika Carter	Guest: Season 8, Recurring Cast: Season 9
2001	Friends	The Teacher	Episode: "The One with Monica's Boots"
2002	For Your Love	Vanessa	Recurring Cast: Season 5
2002	Fastlane	Rosaria	Episode: "Things Done Changed"
2003–04	Rock Me, Baby	Pam Gibson	Main Cast
2005–07	According to Jim	Ms. Crawford	Recurring Cast: Season 5, Guest: Season 6
2005	JAG	Lt. Clarize Boyette	Episode: "Fair Winds and Following Seas"
2005	Barbershop	Lea Robinson	Recurring Cast
2006	Cuts	Professor Duncan	Episode: "Adult Education"
2007–09	Lincoln Heights	Dana Taylor	Recurring Cast: Season 1 & 4, Guest: Season 3
2008	Just Jordan	Crystal	Recurring Cast: Season 2
2009	Sherri	Celia	Main Cast
2010	Ghost Whisperer	Jacqueline	Episode: "The Children's Parade"
2011	9ine	Dolores Goodall	Recurring Cast
2011	Switched at Birth	Denise	Recurring Cast: Season 1
2013	The Client List	Karina Lake	Recurring Cast: Season 2
2013	NCIS: Los Angeles	Yolanda Campbell	Episode: "The Livelong Day"
2014	CSI: Crime Scene Investigation	Rhonda Briggs	Episode: "Keep Calm and Carry-On"
2015–18	K.C. Undercover	Kira Cooper	Main Cast
2016	We Bare Bears	Additional Voices (voice)	Episode: "Baby Bears on a Plane"
2018	Love Is	Carol	Recurring Cast
2018	One Dollar	Mary Bailey	Episode: "Garrett Drimmer"
2018	The Cool Kids	Felicia	Episode: "Hank the Cradle Robber"
2018	Love Daily	Dr. C	Episode: "Group"
2019	Five Points	Ms. Jones	Episode: "You Actually Believe That?"
2020	The Wilds	Angela Reid	Episode: "Day Two"
2020–21	Stuck With You	Candice	Recurring Cast
2021	Big Shot	Mrs. Gibson	Episode: "Great in the Living Room"
2021–22	Queen Sugar	Billie	Main Cast: Season 6-7
2023	Average Joe	Angela Washington	Main Cast
2025	Vampirina: Teenage Vampire	Mrs. Summers	Episode: "First Parents Day"
2025–26	The Chi	Nora	Recurring Cast: Season 7, Guest: Season 8
