= The Groundstar Conspiracy =

1972 film by Lamont Johnson

- DVD cover
- Directed by: Lamont Johnson
- Written by: Douglas Heyes
- Based on: The Alien; 1968 novel by L. P. Davies
- Produced by: Frank Arrigo; Earl A. Glick; Hal Roach Jr. Trevor Wallace
- Starring: George Peppard; Michael Sarrazin; Christine Belford
- Cinematography: Michael Reed
- Edited by: Edward M. Abroms
- Music by: Paul Hoffert
- Color process: Technicolor
- Production company: Hal Roach Studios
- Distributed by: Universal Pictures
- Release date: 21 June 1972
- Running time: 95 minutes
- Countries: Canada; United States
- Language: English

The Groundstar Conspiracy is a 1972 American neo-noir crime film directed by Lamont Johnson. It stars George Peppard and Michael Sarrazin.

Douglas Heyes' screenplay (written under his frequent pseudonym, Matthew Howard) was adapted very freely from L. P. Davies' 1968 novel, The Alien. It was filmed in Vancouver, British Columbia, and produced by Hal Roach Productions (Note: This is the Canadian successor company, not the original company founded by American director and producer Hal Roach.) in Canada.

== Plot ==
Groundstar space project technician John Welles attempts to steal miniaturized rocket fuel system plans from the project's computer facility. His attempt goes awry and he is badly disfigured in an explosion he set and barely escapes. He stumbles to the nearby vacation home of Nicole Devon, and collapses. She calls an ambulance, the authorities are alerted, and soon Welles is operated on, given plastic surgery and interrogated by a hard-boiled government official named Tuxan, but Welles claims to have no memory of his crime. In fact, he claims no memory of his life at all, though he has brief dreams of children playing near the ruins of a Greek temple and a woman struggling in water.

Despite Tuxan's brutal interrogation techniques (consisting of electro-shock, water submersion, and execution threats) Welles still maintains his story of total amnesia. Tuxan allows Welles to escape, hoping he will draw the people behind the attempted theft to him. Welles goes to Nicole's apartment—he learned the address in Tuxan's interrogations—and begs her to help him remember, but she knows nothing. They fall in love as Tuxan keeps them under surveillance.

Eventually Tuxan's plan succeeds: the conspirators behind the attempted theft expose themselves and are arrested. Tuxan then reveals the truth to Welles, who still cannot remember any details of the crime. John Welles actually died following surgery the day after the Groundstar explosion. The man we have come to know as Welles is really Peter Bellamy, a government employee whose girlfriend recently drowned in Greece. Bellamy, not wishing to live with the pain of remembering this loss, volunteered to have his memory wiped via surgery and to play Welles. Welles, a.k.a. Bellamy, then seeks to kill Tuxan for his ruthlessness, but Tuxan persuades him to not exact revenge by telling him he is the only person alive who can start life over without the burdens of the past.

== Cast ==
- George Peppard as Tuxan
- Michael Sarrazin as John David Welles / Peter Bellamy
- Christine Belford as Nicole Devon
- Cliff Potts as Carl Mosely
- James Olson as Senator Douglas Bell Stanton
- Tim O'Connor as Frank Gossage
- James McEachin as Bender
- Alan Oppenheimer as General Hackett
- Hagan Beggs as Dr. Hager
- Barry Cahill as a reporter

== Production ==
The film was based on the 1968 novel The Alien by L. P. Davies. Universal bought film rights in June 1968 prior to publication and assigned Dick Berg to produce. Douglas Heyes was to have filmed the work under the title The Alien starring Robert Stack, Geneviève Bujold and David Janssen, but Bujold leaving the project led to delays in shooting and a new cast.

In July 1971 Universal announced that Michael Sarrazin and George Peppard would star in a film version called The Plastic Man. It would be directed by Lamont Johnson and be a co production between Universal and Hal Roach Productions.

Filming started in Vancouver, Canada on 2 August 1971 with Carol White as the female lead. Shortly into filming White asked to be released and was replaced by Christine Belford. White wanted to go because a production delay meant she was in danger of missing the start date on Made. (Candice Bergen and Tuesday Weld were offered the role but asked for too much money.) All White's footage had to be re-shot.

Peppard was paid $400,000.

The film was shot at the Burnaby campus of Simon Fraser University and the Panorama Mountain Resort.

== Reception ==
On the review aggregator website Rotten Tomatoes, 38% of 8 critics' reviews are positive.
