= Topper Carew =

American film director

- Born: Colin Anthony Carew; July 16, 1943 (age 82); Boston, Massachusetts, U.S.
- Education: Yale (B.Arch, M.S.)
- Occupations: Television producer, screenwriter, television writer, film director
- Years active: 1980–present
- Spouse: Alyce Sprow (1982-2001, dec.)
- Children: 2

Colin Anthony "Topper" Carew (born July 16, 1943) is an American film director, screenwriter and producer.

== Early life ==
Carew was born in Boston, Massachusetts, and raised in the Roxbury section of Boston. He attended John D. O'Bryant School of Math & Science. He initially went to college at Howard University, and later transferred to Yale, where he earned a bachelor's degree in Architecture and a master's degree in Environmental Design. He also has a Doctorate in Communications from the Union Graduate School/Institute for Policy Studies.

== Career ==
Carew began his career making documentary films about the relationship between ethnic neighborhoods and the surrounding architecture. In 1966, he founded The New Thing Art and Architectural Center in Washington, D.C., and it became a community hub in the Adams Morgan neighborhood, hosting music, dance, and various youth programs.

In 1972, he worked at WGBH-TV.

In 1974, he co-founded the non-profit Rainbow Television Workshop in with his late wife, Alyce S. Carew.

He was a Community Fellow at MIT, and a Broadcast Fellow at the Corporation for Public Broadcasting.

In 2018, he became a faculty fellow at Spelman College's Innovation Lab.

He directed and/or produced several films, including Talkin' Dirty After Dark, D.C. Cab, Breakin’ N’ Enterin’ (1983), and Be Somebody... or Be Somebody's Fool! (1984).

He was the creator and executive producer of the television series Martin.

== Personal life ==
Carew was married to Alyce Sprow Carew, who died from breast cancer in 2001. The couple has two daughters, Cicely and Lena Carew.

== Honors and awards ==
His honors include the "National Media Hero Award," a 2013 MIT Martin Luther King Leadership Award, and more than 40 film and television awards, including four NAACP Image Awards and a Robert F. Kennedy Journalism Award.

== Filmography ==
=== Film ===
Year	Name	Role	Notes
1970	This Is the Home of Mrs. Levant Graham	Director, Producer	Short documentary
1972	A Luta Continua	Narrator	Documentary
1983	Breakin' 'N' Enterin'	Director	Documentary
1983	D.C. Cab	Story / Producer	
1984	Be Somebody... or Be Somebody's Fool!	Producer	Direct-to-video
1985	And the Children Shall Lead	Producer	Made-for television
1989	A Little Bit Strange	Executive producer	Made-for-television
1991	Talkin' Dirty After Dark	Director / Screenwriter	
2006	We Don't Die, We Multiply: The Robin Harris Story	Director	Direct-to-video documentary

=== Television ===
Year	Name	Role	Notes
1980	The Righteous Apples	Producer	11 episodes
1987	Bustin' Loose	Executive producer	27 episodes
1989	Homeroom	Executive producer	13 episodes
1992-97	Martin	Creator / Executive producer	Created 132 episodes / Produced 27 episodes
1998	The Journey of Allen Strange	Director	2 episodes
1998	Cousin Skeeter	Director	Episode "Miracle on 32nd Skeet"
2000-02	The Jersey	Director	3 episodes
2001-02	100 Deeds for Eddie McDowd	Director	2 episodes
