= The Gold Robbers =

- Genre: Crime drama
- Developed by: John Hawkesworth
- Screenplay by: John Hawkesworth; Glyn Jones; David Whitaker; Scott Forbes; Allan Prior; Leslie Sands; Pixie Weir; David Weir; Eric Coltart; Jeremy Paul; Berkely Mather; Donald Johnson; George Lansbury; Martin Hall
- Directed by: Don Leaver; Peter Sasdy; Cyril Coke; Lionel Harris; Bill Bain; Alan Clarke
- Starring: Peter Vaughan; Artro Morris; Richard Leech; Frederick Bartman; Peter Copley; Donald Morley; Louise Pajo; Wendy Gifford; Nicholas Ball; Johnny Shannon; Maria Aitken; John Bindon
- Composer: Max Harris
- Country of origin: United Kingdom
- Original language: English
- No. of series: 1
- No. of episodes: 13

Production
- Producer: John Hawkesworth
- Editors: Terry Hine; David Howes
- Running time: 60 minutes (including commercials)
- Production company: LWT

Original release
- Network: ITV
- Release: 6 June – 29 August 1969

The Gold Robbers is a British thirteen-part crime drama series starring Peter Vaughan, Artro Morris, Richard Leech and Peter Copley; the series was produced by LWT and shown on Friday evenings on ITV between 6 June and 29 August 1969. The series was created and devised by John Hawkesworth, it was inspired by the Great Train Robbery which took place on the early hours of 8 August 1963 when £2.61 million was stolen from a Royal Mail train at a railway bridge in Ledburn, Buckinghamshire. Former CID chief DC Supt. Alfred Butler, who worked on the investigation into the robbery, served as the series' technical advisor.

The series was highly successful for LWT, repeatedly gathering audiences of around 15 million viewers, frequently overtaking the BBC in the ratings. It was later sold to ten countries and nominated for a drama series award at 1969 Television Awards organised by The Society of Film and Television Arts in 1970.

== Overview ==
The series follows the lengthy police investigation, led by Det. Chief Supt. Cradock (Vaughan), into one of the biggest and most daring robberies in history, where £5½ million worth of gold bullion is stolen after an aircraft lands at West Marsh airfield in Kent. During the investigation, Cradock repeatedly encounters setbacks and successes as he tracks down the suspects, while he is dogged by his interfering superiors, government officials and the ruthless gang, who use money, threats and murder to protect themselves.

Each episode focusses on a different aspect of the robbery, and the various suspects involved. In an interview with the Grimsby Daily Telegraph in 1969, Vaughan described the character of Cradock as an ordinary man faced with the gigantic task of catching the robbers. He stated "I see him as a man obsessed with this job rather than a policeman, I’m trying to let the human factor come through all the petty irritations and so on." Vaughan saw Cradock as a kind of extension of himself, a real human-being with flaws and weaknesses, whilst trying to do good.

The series was generally well received by critics. William Marshall from the Daily Mirror wrote of the first episode "I thought the episode that introduced The Gold Robbers "(ITV) last week was a taut, gut-grabbing, immaculate piece of work that rubbed on the exposed nerve-ends of anticipation." Majorie Bilbow from The Stage stated it to be one of the best crime drama series to hit the television screens in a while, stating "it promises to be peopled with three-dimensional characters, all with lives of their own, acted by a cast demonstrably alive to the demands of a well-written script."

It notably featured an extensive supporting cast of British actors, some already well-known, others who would become so, including Nicholas Ball, Roy Dotrice, Sally Thomsett, Joss Ackland, George Cole, Ian Hendry, Ann Lynn, Bernard Hepton, Alfred Lynch, Wanda Ventham, Jeremy Child, Christopher Benjamin, Peter Bowles and Geoffrey Whitehead. A number of writers wrote for the series including former Z-Cars contributor Allan Prior, actor and writer Glyn Jones, Doctor Who story editor David Whitaker and novelist Berkley Mather.

A sequel series was planned in 1970, with Vaughan reprising his role as Cradock. However, LWT abandoned the proposed series, stating to the press that it would be virtually impossible to come up with a series containing Cradock that would be of the same high calibre as the original.

== Cast ==
- Peter Vaughan as Det. Chief Supt. Cradock
- Artro Morris as Det. Sgt Tommy Thomas
- Richard Leech as Richard Bolt
- Peter Copley as Asst. Commissioner Farr
- Frederick Bartman as Victor Anderson
- Wendy Gifford as Jo Miller
- John Bindon as Terry Lardner
- Donald Morley as Grierson
- Louise Pajo as Jenny Bolt
- Nicholas Ball as Terry Cradock
- Johnny Shannon as George Nechros
- Maria Aitken as Val
- Sally Thomsett as Sally Hartford
- Joss Ackland as Derek Hartford
- Alethea Charlton as Fay Hartford
- George Cole as Barry Porter
- Peter Madden as Forbes Lingwood
- Jeremy Child as Jeremy Foreman
- George Innes as Dillo
- Frank Sieman as Chief Inspector
- Ronald Clarke as Nobby Clarke
- Roy Dotrice as Freddie Lamb
- Ann Lynn as Rosemary Lamb
- Ian Hendry as Tom Goodwin
- Wanda Ventham as Dee Latter
- Bernard Hepton as Harold Oscroft
- Alfred Lynch as Josef Tyzack
- Colette O'Neil as Mary Tyzack
- Peter Celier as Slade
- Geoffrey Whitehead as Peter Conroy
- Jennifer Hilary as Stephanie Conroy
- Donald Hewlett as Edward Lancing
- Hilda Braid as Vi Conroy
- Patrick Allen as Hon. Timothy Fry
- Christopher Benjamin as Edward Meakin
- Peter Bowles as Stockbroker

== Episodes ==
No.	Title	Directed by	Written by	Original release date
1	"The Great Bullion Robbery"	Don Leaver	John Hawkesworth and Glyn Jones	6 June 1969
A shipment of gold bullion worth £5.5 million is stolen when an aircraft carrying the consignment lands at West Marsh airfield in Kent. Subsequently, Det. Chief Supt. Cradock is assigned to the case, dubbed "The Crime of the Century".
2	"Grounded"	Peter Sasdy	David Whitaker	13 June 1969
While operating from his temporary headquarters at West Marsh airfield. Cradock gets his first lead when eywitness Sally Hartford informs him about seeing the marksman entering her family home during the robbery.
3	"Crack Shot"	Don Leaver	Scott Forbes	20 June 1969
Facing pressure from both his superiors and the Home Office, Cradock is tasked to track down and deliver the marksman who shot at the police car escorting the bullion van.
4	"The Big Spender"	Don Leaver	Allan Prior	27 June 1969
Cradock is convinced that the voice who mimicked a police operator's call belongs to conman Barry Porter. But how can he unearth the evidence that will connect Porter to the robbery?
5	"Dog Eat Dog"	Cyril Coke	Leslie Sands	4 July 1969
It seems someone has paid £30,000 in order to a release a convict to help pull of the job. Can Cradock help figure out the mystery?
6	"Rough Trade"	Lionel Harris	Pixie Weir	11 July 1969
Cradock discovers that getaway driver Peter Conroy has escaped to Austria to evade arrest. But he has left his wife Jennifer behind, and Cradock uses her to find answers.
7	"The Oddly Honest Man"	Bill Bain	David Weir	18 July 1969
Tom Goodwin, the pilot who flew the plane that contained the stolen bullion, is prepared to spill the beans, but can Cradock trust him?
8	"The Arrangement"	Alan Clarke	Eric Coltart	25 July 1969
A meeting is arranged with Cradock, who risks wading deeper into the depths of the criminal underworld for the price of getting on the robbers' trail.
9	"Account Rendered"	Bill Bain	Jeremy Paul	1 August 1969
Cradock reaches a major turning point in his investigation when Harry Oscroft, an accountant to the gold robbers, is threatened at home. His family soon appeal for help, yet Harry is reluctant to assist Cradock with his enquiries.
10	"The Cover Plan"	Cyril Coke	Berkely Mather and John Hawkesworth	8 August 1968
Hon. Timothy Fry DSO travels back to England to help smuggle Terry Lardner's wife and child out of the country. Cradock wants to know why an informer has implicated Fry in the bullion heist.
11	"The Midas Touch"	Lionel Harris	Donald Johnson	15 August 1969
'Mr Big' is arrested in Paris, and Cradock has found the brains behind the robbery. Yet he knows there's someone bigger still at large, so he sets out to find him.
12	"The Man With Two Faces"	Cyril Coke	George Lansbury	22 August 1969
Cradock gets closer to heart of the robbery, yet he finds himself under pressure from powerful men who are pulling the strings behind his superiors.
13	"The Kill"	Bill Bain	John Hawkesworth and Martin Hall	29 August 1969
In spite of warnings, Cradock refuses to give up his bid to capture and arrest the mastermind behind the bullion robbery. But as he closes in on his prey, he finds himself in dangerous territory.

== Availability ==
The Gold Robbers was one of the last major series produced in monochrome by ITV before they commenced colour production later that year. The migration of television to colour limited the repeat potential of the series. Aside from a late evening run in 1970, it was not repeated on television again for over 50 years, when it was broadcast on Talking Pictures TV, commencing on 4 September 2023.

The complete series was released on DVD by Network on 1 July 2013.
