= Nicholas Ball (actor) =

English actor (1946–2024)

- Ball in 2008
- Born: John Nicholas Ball; 11 April 1946; Leamington Spa, Warwickshire, England
- Died: 4 June 2024 (aged 78)
- Occupation: Actor
- Years active: 1967–2024
- Spouse(s): Pamela Stephenson (m. 1978; div. 1984) Ayda Kay (m. 2019)

John Nicholas Ball (11 April 1946 – 4 June 2024) was an English actor. He was best known for playing the title role of private detective James Hazell in the television series Hazell between 1978 and 1979.

Ball portrayed the vicious gang lord Terry Bates in EastEnders between 2007 and 2009. He played Garry Ryan in series five of Footballers' Wives and both series of its spin-off programme Footballers' Wives: Extra Time.

He had played a number of supporting roles in various television series including Z-Cars, Mr. Rose, The Gold Robbers, Softly Softly: Task Force, The Crezz, The Young Ones, Bergerac, Spooky, Tales of the Unexpected, Boon, Colin's Sandwich, Red Dwarf, The Governor, The Bill, Pie in the Sky, Heartbeat, Jonathan Creek, Cold Feet, New Tricks, The Commander, Casualty, Hustle, Holby City and Doctors.

The voice of Nicholas Ball can be heard as well on various audio books offered via the internet; he has narrated books from such authors as Christopher Hitchens and James Maybrick. In 2019, he appeared in an advert for Premier Inn, playing the part of Lenny Henry's manager.

== Personal life ==
Ball was born in Leamington Spa, Warwickshire, and raised in Hastings, Sussex. He trained to be an actor at Bristol Old Vic.

Ball was married to actress and psychologist, Pamela Stephenson from 1978 until 1984, when she left him for the comedian Billy Connolly. He later married his long-term partner, actress Ayda Kay, in 2019.

Ball died on 4 June 2024, at the age of 78.

== Filmography ==
=== Film ===
Year	Title	Role	Notes
1975	Overlord	Arthur	
1978	Who Is Killing the Great Chefs of Europe?	Skeffington	UK title: Too Many Chefs
1985	Lifeforce	Derebridge	
1985	Running Out of Luck	(unknown)	
1985	Claudia	Howard	
1989	Casino	Julien	Short film
1994	Perfect Gift	Sheffield	
1998	Croupier	Jack Snr.	
1999	The Manor	Sir Everett Blake	
2000	Out of Depth	Lenny	
2002	Championship	George	Short film
2002	Top Dog	Ray King	Short film
2004	Hellboy	Russian General	Director's Cut DVD. Uncredited role
2008	Mutant Chronicles	Plutocrat	
2008	Sisterhood	Jack	
2009	Dead Man Running	Fight Bookie	
2011	Peter	Martin Clement	
2011	Enchantress	Merlin	
2012	Fifteen	Mr. Allen	Also associate producer
2013	Nightmare Box	Man	
2015	Surgery	The Crude Surgeon	Short film
2018	The Krays: Dead Man Walking	Harry Webster	
2019	Muse	Mr. Williams	
2019	Whatever Became of Richard Blaine?	Richard	Short film
2019	Pentagram	Mr. Halsey	
2022	The Haunting of Pendle Hill	Uncle Alfred	
2023	Trafficking	David Willis	
2023	A New Breed of Criminal	Charlie Kray	
2024	The Kingdom by the Sea	Ray	Final role

=== Television ===
Year	Title	Role	Notes
1968	Z-Cars	Despatch Rider	Series 6; episode 158: "Punch-Up: Part 2"
1968	The Gunpowder Plot	Sir Everard Digby	Television film
1968	The Odd Man	Francis - Young Gentleman	Series 3 (Mr. Rose); episode 5: "Free and Easy"
1969	ITV Playhouse	Philip	Series 2; episode 26: "Murder: Nobody Knows"
1969	The Elusive Pimpernel	Philinte	Mini-series; episode 6: "The Dauphin in the Tower"
1969	The Gold Robbers	Terry Cradock	Mini-series; episodes 5, 8 & 13
1970	Coronation Street	Spider Smart	1 episode
1970	Confession	Karl	Episode 6: "Just as the Sun Was Rising"
1970	The Black Tulip	Captain Tilley	Mini-series; episodes 2, 3 & 6
1970	From a Bird's Eye View	Jack Desmond	Episode 6: "Nobody Sleeps on a Honeymoon"
1971	Jamie	Edward Bruce	Episode 11: "Ettercap"
1972	ITV Sunday Night Theatre	Geoff	Series 4; episode 20: "Ben Spray"
1975	Softly, Softly: Task Force	Andrews	Series 7; episode 3: "Protection"
1976	Play for Today	Police Constable Wilding	Series 6; episode 15: "A Story to Frighten the Children"
1976	Couples	Mr. Minter	Episodes 73–78
1976	Play of the Month	James Vane	Series 12; episode 1: "The Picture of Dorian Gray"
1976	Rogue Male	2nd Seaman	Television film
1976	The Crezz	Colin Pitman	5 episodes
1976	Crown Court	Det. Sgt. Jeffrey Lent	Series 5; episodes 78–80: "Lola: Parts 1–3"
1978–1979	Hazell	James Hazell	Series 1 & 2; 22 episodes
1980	Hammer House of Horror	William	Episode 5: "The House that Bled to Death"
1980	Life for Christine	Colin	Television film
1980	Play for Today	John Arnott	Series 10; episode 14: "Thicker Than Water"
1981	Play for Today	Terry	Series 11; episode 19: "Sorry"
1982	The Young Ones	Dr. Jim Morrison	Series 1; episode 5: "Interesting"
1983	Bergerac	Hardaker	Series 2; episode 7: "A Miracle Every Week"
1983	Spooky	Danny Roberts	Episode 3: "The Danny Roberts Show"
1983	Nelly's Version	Insp. Leach	Television film
1983	Who Cares Wins - The Key to Success	Salesman	Austin Rover staff training video
1983	Video Stars	Bob Surge	Television film
1984	Alas Smith and Jones	Various characters	Series 1; episode 1: "Police Chiropodist"
1985	A.D.	Burrus - Roman Officer	Mini-series; episodes 1 & 3–5
1988	Windmills of the Gods	Harry Lantz	Mini-series; episodes 1 & 2
1988	Tales of the Unexpected	Ken Johnson	Series 9; episode 7: "The Dead Don't Steal"
1988	Bergerac	Gravel Beresford	Series 6; episode 8: "Retirement Plan"
1989	Boon	Gerry Anscomb	Series 4; episode 1: "Walking Off Air"
1990	Colin's Sandwich	Alan Hunter	Series 2; episodes 1, 3 & 4
1990	Cluedo	Mr. Hall	Series 1; episode 2: "Deadly Disco"
1991	El C.I.D.	Brian	Series 2; episode 3: "In the Rough"
1991	Red Dwarf	Simulant	Series 4; episode 3: "Justice"
1993	South of Sunset	Jonas Cooper	Episode 4: "Family Affair"
1993	Acapulco H.E.A.T.	Derek Perkins	Episode 10: "Code Name: Body Double"
1994	Silk Stalkings	Dustin Rhoades	Season 3; episode 15: "Love Bandit"
1994	Tarzán	Robin Conway	Season 3; episode 21: "Tarzan and the Dangerous Competition"
1995	The Governor	Edward Maynard	Series 1; episode 2
1996	The Bill	Jim Brodie	Series 12; episode 9: "Judgement Call"
1996	Pie in the Sky	DCI Doggett	Series 3; episode 4: "Doggett's Coat and Badge"
1996	Respect	Ronnie Ellis	Television film
1997	The Famous Five	Tiger Dan	Series 2; episode 9: "Five Go Off in a Caravan"
1997	Insiders	Neil Pine	Episode 6: "Exposure"
1997	The Man Who Made Husbands Jealous	Larry Lockton	Mini-series; episodes 1–3
1997	Thief Takers	DCI Nick Hall	Series 3; episodes 3–8
1997	Heartbeat	Charlie Fenton	Series 7; episode 7: "The Family Way"
1999	Harbour Lights	Alan Semple	Series 1; episode 2: "Prince Charming"
1999	Jonathan Creek	Vincent Rees	Series 3; episode 5: "Miracle in Crooked Lane"
2000	The Coral Island	Pirate Captain	Mini-series; episodes 1–4
2000	Urban Gothic	Mr. Dimes	Series 1; episode 11: "The Boy's Club"
2000	Cold Feet	Felix Bishop	Series 3; episodes 1–3
2004	The Courtroom	Philip Catlow	Episode 11: "Slaves and Donkeys"
2005	The Commander	John Dawson	Series 2; episodes 1–4: "Virus: Parts 1 & 2" & "Blackdog: Parts 1 & 2"
2005	New Tricks	Webb	Series 2; episode 3: "Trust Me"
2005–2006	Footballers' Wives: Extra Time	Garry Ryan	Series 1 & 2; 14 episodes
2006	Footballers' Wives	Garry Ryan	Series 5; 6 episodes
2007	Heartbeat	Gregory Flambard	Series 16; episode 19: "Mind Games"
2007	Casualty	Michael Shapiro	Series 21; episode 19: "Fish Out of Water"
2007–2009	EastEnders	Terry	15 episodes
2008	Double the Fist	Fist Army	Series 2; episode 8: "Medieval"
2009	Hustle	Frank Rice	Series 5; episode 4: "Diamond Seeker"
2011	Casualty	Frank Fonteyne	Series 25; episode 37: "When the Bough Breaks..."
2011	Rosamunde Pilcher	(unknown)	Episode 103: "Verlobt, verliebt, verwirrt"
2015, 2017	Holby City	Barry Copeland	Series 17; episode 50, & series 19; episode 14
2020	Doctors	Harold 'Aitch' Snetterton	Series 21; episode 152: "Bye-Bye, Mr. Kippy"
