= Veronica Roberts =

British actress

Veronica Roberts is a British actress, best known for playing Dorothy Bennett in the BBC drama Tenko and Laura Elliott in the ITV series Peak Practice. In 1975 she also had a regular role playing Deborah Wilson in the Granada series Sam (1973 TV series) Play Miss Robinson in the "Mr Ellis versus the people" in the Granada TV series Village Hall 1974.

She has also made short-term appearances in EastEnders, Casualty, The Bill, Holby City, Heartbeat, Little Britain, New Tricks and Emma (BBC TV Adaptation 2009).
