= Jan Waters =

English actress)

- Born: Janet Ruth Waters; 28 January 1937 (age 89); Bournemouth, Hampshire, England
- Occupation: Actress
- Years active: 1960–2004
- Spouses: Peter Gilmore (m. 1970; div. 1976) Philip York (m. 2018; died 2019)
- Children: 2

Jan Waters (born 28 January 1937) is an English actress of the theatre, television, and film. She was particularly active in the London theatre scene during the 1960s and 1970s, notably appearing in the original West End productions of Jule Styne's Do Re Mi and Noël Coward's High Spirits. She also appeared on British television and in a few British films during this time. She was once married to actor Peter Gilmore.

== Career ==
Waters was born in Bournemouth, Hampshire to Albert Edward and Florence May Waters. She made her professional stage debut in 1960 in the title role of a pantomime version of the classic story of Cinderella at the Adelphi Theatre. The following year she made her first film appearance as Jackie in Lance Comfort's Touch of Death and she portrayed the role of Tilda Mullen in the original West End production of Jule Styne's Do Re Mi at the Prince of Wales Theatre. She remained highly active in London theatre throughout the 1960s in everything from musicals to classic plays to original stage works. Some of her more notable appearances during this time include Beatrice in William Shakespeare's Much Ado about Nothing (1962) at the Old Vic Theatre, Ruth Condomine in the original West End production of Noël Coward's High Spirits (1964) at the Savoy Theatre, Polly Peachum in John Gay's The Beggar's Opera (1968) at the Apollo Theatre, and Miss Ethel Monticue in Margaret MacKenzie's The Young Visitors (1968) at the Piccadilly Theatre. Waters also appeared in the 1968 horror film Corruption and made several television appearances as a guest artist, including work on Crane (1964), The Rat Catchers (1966), The Saint (1967), and Fraud Squad (1969) among others. She sang and acted in the BBC Radio Series Benny Hill Time in 1964. She was also a regular singer on the BBC radio series Beyond Our Ken in the very early 1960s.

During the 1970s, Waters continued to remain active on the stage and in television. In 1970 she toured the UK with the Cambridge Theatre Company in productions of Ben Jonson's The Alchemist (portraying Dol Common) and David Turner's Semi-Detached (portraying Eileen Midway). That same year she appeared on the television series The Mating Machine and Menace. In 1971 she appeared at the Garrick Theatre as Vivien in Don't Start Without Me and guest starred on the show Jason King for one episode. The following year she appeared as Julie in Show Boat at the Adelphi Theatre. In 1973 she portrayed Eleanor in Only a Game at the Shaw Theatre and toured the UK with the Prospect Theatre Company, performing the roles of Oello in The Royal Hunt of the Sun, Maria in Twelfth Night, and both Boult and Dionyza in Pericles, Prince of Tyre. In 1974 she repeated the role of Dionyza at Her Majesty's Theatre and portrayed the role of Carla in Kennedy's Children at the King's Head Theatre. This was followed by a portrayal of the title role in Susanna Andler at the Haymarket Theatre and television appearances on Sutherland's Law and Softly, Softly: Task Force in 1975. Waters continued to make periodic stage and television appearance in the late 1970s, most notably portraying Eliza Doolittle in George Bernard Shaw's Pygmalion and Portia in Twelfth Night in tours of the UK and the Far East with the Palace Theatre Company, Watford, Hertfordshire.

In 1980, she played Queenie in Born in the Gardens at the Globe Theatre, and later starred in the original production of Noises Off at the Lyric, Hammersmith and Savoy theatres. Her latterday screen appearances include Take the High Road in which she played the imperious Lady Margaret Ross-Gifford, Sweet Sixteen, Dramarama, Paradise Postponed, the 1987 film Lionheart, September Song and Doctors.

In 2009, she appeared in the film Mr. Right. She is currently playing Mrs Boyle in Agatha Christie's The Mousetrap at St Martin's Theatre, London. She is soon to embark on the first ever UK tour of The Mousetrap playing Mrs Boyle for the first 10 weeks of the tour.

== Sources ==
- Biography of Jan Waters at filmreference.com
