= Journey to the Unknown =

British TV series or programme (1968–1969)

- Opening titles
- Genre: Speculative fiction
- Written by: Various
- Directed by: Various
- Presented by: (TV films only); Patrick McGoohan; Sebastian Cabot; Joan Crawford
- Theme music composer: Harry Robinson
- Country of origin: United Kingdom
- Original language: English
- No. of seasons: 1
- No. of episodes: 17 (list of episodes)

Production
- Executive producers: Joan Harrison; Norman Lloyd
- Producer: Anthony Hinds
- Production locations: MGM-British Studios; Borehamwood; Hertfordshire, England, United Kingdom
- Running time: 60 minutes
- Production company: Hammer Film Productions

Original release
- Network: ABC
- Release: September 26, 1968 – January 30, 1969

Journey to the Unknown is a British anthology television series, produced by Hammer Film Productions and 20th Century Fox Television. It aired on ABC from September 26, 1968, to January 30, 1969. The series first aired in the UK on the ITV network on 16 November 1968.

== Format ==
The series has a fantasy, science fiction, supernatural and horror theme, very similar to the American television series The Twilight Zone, and deals with normal people whose everyday situations somehow become extraordinary. It featured both British and American actors: American actors included George Maharis, Vera Miles, Barbara Bel Geddes, Patty Duke, Carol Lynley, Joseph Cotten, Stefanie Powers and Brandon deWilde, along with familiar British actors such as Dennis Waterman, Jane Asher, Kay Walsh, Roddy McDowall, Nanette Newman, Ann Bell and Tom Adams. Seventeen episodes were produced. Directors of the episodes included Roy Ward Baker, Alan Gibson, Robert Stevens, Don Chaffey and Michael Lindsay-Hogg. Each episode was executive-produced either by Joan Harrison or Norman Lloyd, both of whom had co-produced Alfred Hitchcock Presents and The Alfred Hitchcock Hour from 1955 to 1965.

In America, eight episodes from the series were broadcast as four made-for-television films consisting of twinned episodes along with new segment introduction footage provided by actors Patrick McGoohan, Sebastian Cabot and Joan Crawford serving as hosts:

Title	Host	Segments	Original airdate
Journey into Darkness	Patrick McGoohan	"The New People" / "Paper Dolls"	1969
Journey to Murder	Joan Crawford	"Do Me a Favor and Kill Me" / "The Killing Bottle"	January 30, 1971
Journey to Midnight	Sebastian Cabot	"Poor Butterfly" / "The Indian Spirit Guide"	October 31, 1971
Journey to the Unknown	Joan Crawford	"Matakitas is Coming" / "The Last Visitor"	February 11, 1973

== Opening title sequence ==
The series had a memorable whistled theme tune composed by Harry Robinson of Hammer Film Productions, and a creepy title sequence that featured a roller coaster filmed at night at a deserted amusement park (Battersea Park Fun Fair in the London Borough of Wandsworth, London).

== Episodes ==
No.	Title	Directed by	Written by	Original release date
1	"Eve"	Robert Stevens	Paul Wheeler, Michael Ashe	September 26, 1968
A shy sales clerk (Dennis Waterman) falls in love with a mannequin (Carol Lynley) in his department store. Based on the short story "Special Delivery" by John Collier.
2	"Jane Brown's Body"	Alan Gibson	Anthony Skene	October 3, 1968
A woman (Stefanie Powers) attempts suicide, but is rescued; she has amnesia, and has to recall everything gradually. Based on a story by Cornell Woolrich.
3	"The Indian Spirit Guide"	Roy Ward Baker	Robert Bloch	October 10, 1968
A widow (Julie Harris) hopes to get in touch with her dead husband, but knows most people claiming to be spiritualist mediums are fakes; she hires a detective (Tom Adams) to help her weed out the phonies. He sets up some scenarios to make it appear that he's identifying fakes, so that she'll keep paying him. Based on a story by Robert Bloch.
4	"Miss Belle"	Robert Stevens	Sarett Rudley	October 24, 1968
An embittered spinster (Barbara Jefford) has turned against all men, and is raising her niece Roberta as a proper young lady—in spite of the fact that Roberta is actually Robert, a boy. A drifter (George Maharis) starts to work for Miss Belle... Based on the short story "Miss Gentilbelle" by Charles Beaumont.
5	"Paper Dolls"	James Hill	Oscar Millard	November 7, 1968
A set of quadruplets (played by Roderick and Barnaby Shaw) are telepathically connected as they feel one another's pain and share skills and talents; Michael Tolan and Nanette Newman play teachers who investigate. Based on the novel The Paper Dolls by L. P. Davies.
6	"The New People"	Peter Sasdy	Oscar Millard and John Gould	November 14, 1968
A young American couple (Robert Reed and Jennifer Hilary) move to England, where they find their neighbors are a bit too friendly and helpful. Based on the short story "The New People" by Charles Beaumont.
7	"One on an Island"	Noel Howard	Oscar Millard	November 21, 1968
Shipwrecked on a desert island, a man (Brandon deWilde) is soon joined by two companions (Suzanna Leigh and Bob Sessions), but jealousy overwhelms him. Based on a story by Donald E. Westlake.
8	"Matakitas is Coming"	Michael Lindsay-Hogg	Robert Heverley	November 28, 1968
A researcher (Vera Miles) is transported back in time, and apparently trapped with a librarian (Gay Hamilton) inside a deserted library with a mad serial killer, Andros Matakitas (Leon Lissek).
9	"Girl of My Dreams"	Peter Sasdy	Robert Bloch and Michael J. Bird	December 5, 1968
A waitress (Zena Walker) can foretell the future and knows when people are going to die. An unscrupulous man (Michael Callan) finds out about her power and exploits her. Based on the 1963 short story "Girl of My Dreams" by Richard Matheson.
10	"Somewhere in a Crowd"	Alan Gibson	Michael J. Bird	December 12, 1968
A television news anchor (David Hedison) witnesses several tragic accidents, and notices that the same five people are present on each occasion. Based on the short story "The Crowd" by Ray Bradbury.
11	"Do Me a Favor and Kill Me"	Gerry O'Hara	Stanley Miller	December 19, 1968
A down-on-his luck actor (Joseph Cotten) asks a friend to kill him so his family can have the insurance money. The murder is to happen randomly, the actor not knowing when or where, and his friend will not respond to any attempt to contact him. Now the actor decides he doesn't want to die, but how can he call it off? Based on a story by Frederick Rawlings.
12	"The Beckoning Fair One"	Don Chaffey	William Woods and John Gould	December 26, 1968
A young man (Robert Lansing) recovering from a nervous breakdown moves into a haunted house. The ghost is a beautiful girl, and he falls in love with her, overlooking his living fiancee (Gabrielle Drake). Based on the novella The Beckoning Fair One by Oliver Onions.
13	"The Last Visitor"	Don Chaffey	Alfred Shaughnessy	January 2, 1969
On vacation at a resort, a young woman (Patty Duke) is plagued by a mysterious visitor; the proprietress (Kay Walsh) informs her that the visitor is her estranged husband.
14	"Poor Butterfly"	Alan Gibson	Jeremy Paul	January 9, 1969
Invited to a costume party at a wealthy mansion, a man (Chad Everett) finds that everything looks as it did in the 1920s. Then he meets a girl who keeps saying she needs to leave... Based on the short story "Poor Butterfly" by William Abney.
15	"Stranger in the Family"	Peter Duffell	David Campton	January 16, 1969
A boy can control people; this sometimes leads to their deaths. Both a scientist and the agent of a struggling actress (Janice Rule) would like to get their hands on him.
16	"The Madison Equation"	Rex Firkin	Michael J. Bird	January 23, 1969
A detective investigates the electrocution of a computer technician and discovers it's no accident. Barbara Bel Geddes and Allan Cuthbertson play the scientists who developed the computer.
17	"The Killing Bottle"	John Gibson	Julian Bond	January 30, 1969
In order to obtain the family inheritance, a man (Barry Evans) must have his brother declared insane. The brother hates anyone who does harm to living creatures, so they show him a butterfly killing bottle, hoping he will go mad and assault the owner (Roddy McDowall). Based on the short story "The Killing Bottle" by L. P. Hartley.
