= World's Craziest Fools =

- Genre: Clip/Comedy
- Written by: Lee Kern
- Directed by: Lucy Forbes
- Presented by: Mr. T
- Voices of: Rupert Vansittart
- Theme music composer: Erran Baron Cohen
- Ending theme: "I Pity the Fool"
- Country of origin: United Kingdom
- Original language: English
- No. of seasons: 2
- No. of episodes: 20

Production
- Executive producer: Ash Atalla
- Producers: Chris Sussman; Joe McVey
- Editor: Matt Jeffreys
- Running time: 28 minutes
- Production company: BBC/Roughcut TV

Original release
- Network: BBC Three
- Release: 6 June 2011 – 11 March 2013

World's Craziest Fools is a clip show made by Roughcut TV for BBC Three, presented by Mr. T. It showcases clips, sometimes viral, of people making themselves look like "Fools" (a reference to Mr. T's catchphrase), often by accident. Many clips were from CCTV footage. The videos are shown in different categories such as "Parking Fools", "Drunk Fools", "Workmen Fools", "Criminal Fools", "Assorted Fools", and "Fools Jumping Off Stuff They Shouldn't Be Jumping Off". As would be expected, some categories see more entries than others, and the categories that feature episode-to-episode are not bound to a predetermined structure.

== Animation ==
In some segments of the show, animations were used to tell the story of a fool or fools who had either done something reckless or stupid, or criminals who performed crimes and got caught because of a mistake they made or believing they could get away with it when they hadn't. Other animations were used for phone calls, either to the police or emergency services (the first series featured calls to the police in the United States, the second series did calls to the police in the United Kingdom), or other dumb-sounding calls. In the second series, some clips were used alongside animation for products created by "T-Industries", usually to the tune of a product advertisement. The animations were done by Big Red Button and Ben and Will Animation.

Every episode contains a 1-2-minute "Top 5" countdown segment on various categories, such as places not to park or tips on how to be a good policeman. This animation was produced by Christopher Poole and Plastic Horse.

== Broadcasting ==
The first episode aired on 6 June 2011 on BBC Three receiving a large 756,000 overnight audience viewing. A new episode aired on Monday nights at 10:30pm. The show was repeated often throughout the week, from Tuesday to Monday - 7 showings in total. The second episode received a respectable 608,000 in the overnight ratings. However, by the fifth episode, overnight ratings came to a series high peaking at 848,000. Ratings stayed strong for the remainder of the first season. It was also one of the most watched BBC Three shows on BBC iPlayer.

On 3 February 2012, BBC Three announced that the show would return for a second series. It started airing on 7 January 2013 at 10:00pm.

The series also airs in Canada on the Much Music network, in New Zealand on TV2, in Denmark on TV2 Zulu, in Australia on 7mate, in Italy on DMAX and in Portugal on Odisseia. Parts of the show can also being seen on the Dutch channel Veronica. UPtv in the United States began running the show in syndication in October 2017.

Since October 2019 both seasons have been available on Amazon Prime Video although they are packaged as a twenty episode single season. Episodes differ slightly from when originally broadcast, due to clips being removed due to copyright reasons.

== Episode list and viewing figures ==
=== Season 1 (2011) ===
Episode no.	Airdate	Total viewers (overnights)
1	6 June 2011	756,000
2	13 June 2011	608,000
3	20 June 2011	643,000
4	27 June 2011	616,000
5	4 July 2011	848,000
6	11 July 2011	637,000
7	18 July 2011	616,000
8	25 July 2011	719,000
9	1 August 2011	729,000
10	8 August 2011	692,000

=== Season 2 (2013) ===
Episode no.	Airdate	Total viewers (overnights)
1	7 January 2013	-
2	14 January 2013	-
3	21 January 2013	-
4	28 January 2013	-
5	4 February 2013	-
6	11 February 2013	-
7	18 February 2013	-
8	25 February 2013	-
9	4 March 2013	-
10	11 March 2013	-
