= Michael Voysey =

English screenwriter (1920–1987)

Michael Voysey (1920 in Grimsby − 1987 in Colchester) was an English playwright and writer for television programmes.

As a playwright, he created My Astonishing Self from the works of George Bernard Shaw. He also wrote The Amorous Goldfish and adapted Marguerite by Armand Salacrou

== Works ==
As a television writer he wrote the following:

- Father Brown (1974), television series (adaptation)
- Cheri (1973), television
- Cranford (1972), television
- Wives and Daughters (1971), television miniseries (adaptation)
- Imperial Palace (1969), television
- Middlemarch (1968), television miniseries (adaptation)
- "A Place of One's Own", an episode of Mystery and Imagination (1968)
- The White Rabbit (1967), television series adapted by Voysey from the novels by Bruce Marshall
- The Woman in White (1966), television series (writer)
- Mr. John Jorrocks (1966), television series (writer)
- The Old Wives' Table (1964), television
- Suspense (1962), television series (writer)
- Persuasion (1960), television miniseries
- Barnaby Rudge (1960), television series (writer)
- Hilda Lessways (1959), television (adaptation)
- The Royalty (1957), television series (writer)
- "The Present", an episode of Douglas Fairbanks, Jr., Presents (1956)
