= Project X (1968 film) =

1968 film by William Castle

- Theatrical poster.
- Directed by: William Castle
- Screenplay by: Edmund Morris
- Based on: The Artificial Man (1965 novel) by L. P. Davies; Psychogeist (1966 novel) by L. P. Davies
- Produced by: William Castle
- Starring: Christopher George; Greta Baldwin; Henry Jones; Monte Markham; Harold Gould
- Cinematography: Harold E. Stine
- Edited by: Edwin H. Bryant
- Music by: Nathan Van Cleave
- Production company: Paramount Pictures
- Distributed by: Paramount Pictures
- Release date: May 1968 (U.S.)
- Running time: 100 minutes
- Country: United States
- Language: English

Project X is a 1968 American science fiction film produced and directed by William Castle, and starring Christopher George, Greta Baldwin, Henry Jones, Monte Markham, and Harold Gould. It is based on the novels The Artificial Man (1965) and Psychogeist (1966) by L. P. Davies. The story echoes some geopolitical themes of the late 1960s, such as overpopulation, emerging genetic engineering, biological warfare, cryogenics and fear of Asian dominance. It mixes in science fiction concepts like holographic devices, memory manipulation and viewing, and virtual environments to create a story about futuristic espionage.

The film was released by Paramount Pictures in May 1968.

== Plot ==
Hagen Arnold is an American spy in the year 2118. The geopolitical climate of Earth has changed significantly over the years with Sino-Asia (China) being the only other superpower and enemy of the United States. Overpopulation is a looming issue. On a covert mission to Sino-Asia, Arnold sends a message to his handlers in the U. S. stating that "The West will be destroyed in fourteen days". Prior to the mission, he had been injected with an anti-torture drug which is triggered by extreme pain. The extreme pain will erase his mind, making it impossible for him to reveal anything to his torturers.

Hagen is safely brought back to the US and placed in cryogenic preservation until the government can devise a way to get the information out of him. With the key to discovering the secret weapon the Sino-Asians were working on locked inside his mind the American scientists resort to using a holographic memory reading device that can see inside his mind while he is asleep. The scientists also create an elaborate historical reenactment of the 1960s (Arnold has a history degree centered on this tumultuous decade) as a means to create a role-playing mechanism that may coax the information from his subconscious to the surface of the unsuspecting Arnold. To keep his suspicions down in the 1960s mock-up, they also create a 1960s personality matrix to implant in his mind. He is led to believe he is a criminal hiding out at a farmhouse and cannot leave lest he be arrested.

As the days tick down until the East destroys the West, Hagen comes into contact with a futuristic factory worker named Karen Summers who causes slight anachronistic errors with the 1960s facade. An unseen sniper scares her off, leaving Hagen suspicious but none the wiser about the facade he is experiencing. The government finds and detains Karen but tension mounts as not only has Hagen not divulged the secret they need but another agent, the unseen sniper, a man known as Gregory Gallea, enters the scene in an attempt to coax the memories out of Hagen. His intention is to obtain the prized info so he can double-cross the U. S. government. Gallea has been gone for two years and presumed dead, apparently killed in action while keeping tabs on Sino-Asia. It was he who helped Hagen escape Sino-Asia.

The memory viewing and holographic machinery unleashes a mental power in Hagen. The mental power creates an energy field that kills Gallea in a spectacular display of light and fury. His death however becomes the key the scientists were looking for. They extract Gallea's brain from his body, and, while keeping it alive in a nutrient tank, perform the same brain reading exercise on it as they did with Hagen. Gallea's memories show how the Sino-Asians plan on destroying the West. Gallea injected Hagen Arnold with a myriad of medieval diseases which will, in fourteen days, make him a living plague bomb capable of spreading the diseases throughout the U. S., thus effectively destroying it from within.

The lead scientist, Crowther, recalls that Arnold was in cryo-suspension most of the fourteen-day period, so there is still time to immunize him and save the West. They do so while he is unconscious and then implant a third identity into him, one in which he is living in the future, and happily married to the beautiful Karen Summers. Arnold wakes up in a bright and happy new future, a married man who will be allowed by the state to have two children with his new wife.

== Cast ==
- Christopher George as Hagen Arnold
- Greta Baldwin as Karen Summers
- Henry Jones as Dr. Crowther
- Monte Markham as Gregory Gallea
- Harold Gould as Colonel Holt
- Phillip Pine as Lee Craig (as Phillip E. Pine)
- Lee Delano as Dr. Tony Verity
- Ivan Bonar as Colonel Cowen
- Robert Cleaves as Dr. George Tarvin
- Charles Irving as Major Tolley

== Involvement with Hanna-Barbera ==
The film is notable featuring animated sequences created by Hanna-Barbera, in many case as a low-budget solution to potentially expensive visual effects shots. Examples include a futuristic VTOL-style jet representing the escape plane Hagen Arnold uses to escape from Sino-Asia. Another reuses a previous shot from the animated Jonny Quest TV series of an underwater elevator which terminates inside a submarine on the ocean floor. All animated and some live action sequences were further enhanced with either visual haze, wavy imagery, double exposures, reverse-negative images, monochromatic colors, and other optical effects available in the era.
