= Alethea Charlton =

English actress (1931–1976)

- Born: Alethea Blow Charlton; 9 August 1931; Middlesbrough, North Riding of Yorkshire, England
- Died: 6 May 1976 (aged 44); Chelsea, London, England
- Occupation: Actress
- Years active: 1961–1976

Alethea Blow Charlton (9 August 1931 – 6 May 1976) was an English television and radio actress.

== Early life and education ==
Alethea was born in Middlesbrough, North Riding of Yorkshire, England. She attended Ripon High School and the Northern Theatre School which was based at the Bradford Playhouse.

== Career ==
After working in repertory for a few years in Yorkshire, she moved to London in 1960 before touring American universities as a member of a group. Charlton's first screen role was in a now missing episode of Educated Evans, a BBC comedy series starring Charlie Chester. Her only film appearance was in 1962's Touch of Death, starring William Lucas and David Sumner.

Beginning in 1961, she began to make regular appearances on TV, including multiple appearances on the long-running series Z-Cars between 1962 and 1971. In 1963 Charlton was a cast member in episodes two, three and four of the first ever Doctor Who serial (An Unearthly Child) as a cavewoman called Hur. She returned to the series two years later, playing the character Edith in the serial The Time Meddler in 1965.

Her TV credits include: Follyfoot, The Borderers, Doomwatch, Out of the Unknown, Upstairs, Downstairs. Her best known role was the character of Ethel Barraclough in the Granada Television drama Sam, across the shows three series broadcast from 1973 to 1975.

Between 1968 and 1975 Charlton made several appearances on BBC Radio 4's Afternoon Theatre. She also acted in The Dales, and in radio adaptations of Richard Gordon's Doctor novels.

Charlton died at the Royal Marsden Hospital, Chelsea, from skin cancer in May 1976, aged 44. Her death came less than two months after her Sam co-star, Michael Goodliffe. Her final acting role was in the soap opera The Cedar Tree, which was aired posthumously in October 1976.

== Filmography ==
Year	Title	Episode(s)	Role	Network	Archive status
1958	Educated Evans	Series 2, Episode 4: Musical Tip	Lucy	BBC Television Service	Missing
1961	Deadline Midnight	Series 3, Episode 9: Striptease	Objector	ITV (ATV)	Exists
1962	Z-Cars	Series 1, Episode 22: Incident Reported	Vicky Carron	BBC Television	Exists
1962	Silent Evidence	Episode 6: Prophet of Truth	Sister Cook	BBC Television	Missing
1962	Playbox	Series 8, Episode 2	Sarah Hepple	BBC Television	Missing
1962	Touch of Death	Feature film	Mrs. Grey	Helion Pictures	Exists
1963	Z-Cars	Series 2, Episode 24: Follow My Leader	Millie Lovegrove	BBC Television	Missing
1963	The Sunday Play	Series 4, Episode 48: Plain Jane	Myrtle	BBC Television	Missing
1963	Doctor Who	Series 1: An Uneartly Child (3 episodes)	Hur	BBC Television	Exists
1964	Compact	Episode 232: A Difficult Assignment	Mrs. Timms	BBC Television	Missing
1964	Sergeant Cork	Series 3, Episode 6: The Case of the Medicine Man	Rose	ITV (ATV)	Exists
1964	Armchair Mystery Theatre	Series 2, Episode 3: The Lonely Crime	Nora	ITV (ABC)	Missing
1964	The Sleeper	Series 1, Episode 3: Rendezvous	Ilina	BBC Two	Exists
1964	Cluff	Series 1, Episode 5: The Daughter-in-law	Miriam Bateson	BBC One	Missing
1964	The Villains	Series 3, Episode 1: Bent	Mary Bates	ITV (Granada)	Exists
1964	The Indian Tales of Rudyard Kipling	Episode 23: A Second-rate Woman	Mrs. Bent	BBC One	Missing
1964	Armchair Theatre	Episode: The Bandstand (unbroadcast due to schedling issues)	Unknown	ITV (ABC)	Exists
1965	Z-Cars	Series 4, Episode 24: The Long Spoon	Mrs. Rosser	BBC One	Missing
1965	Sherlock Holmes	Episode 3: The Copper Beeches	Mrs. Rucastle	BBC One	Exists
1965	Doctor Who	Series 2: The Time Meddler (4 episodes)	Edith	BBC One	Exists
1965	Armchair Mystery Theatre	Series 3, Episode 9: The Madam	Leonie	ITV (ABC)	Missing
1965	Cluff	Series 2, Episode 13: The Village Constable	Gunhilda	BBC One	Exists
1965	Hereward the Wake	Series 1, Episode 9: The War Arrow	Gunhilda	BBC One	Missing
1965	Z-Cars	Series 5, Episode 11: But the Crying...	Margaret Thomson	BBC One	Exists
1966	The Wednesday Play	Series 4, Episode 7: A Game, Like, Only a Game	Elizabeth	BBC One	Missing
1966	The Woman in White	All six episodes	Marian Halcombe	BBC One	Missing
1966	Thirty-Minute Theatre	Series 2, Episode 6: Play to Win	Margot Winters	BBC Two	Missing
1967	Sir Arthur Conan Doyle	Episode 2: The Croxley Master	Anastasia	BBC Two	Missing
1967	Emergency Ward 10	Series 3, Episode 8: A Cry for Help	Renee	ITV (ATV)	Missing
1967	Out of Town Theatre	Episode 5: A Nun's Tale	Sister Ursula	BBC One	Missing
1967	Armchair Theatre	Series 7, Episode 17: The Snares of Death	Vera Gabbitas	ITV (ABC)	Missing
1967	ITV Playhouse	Series 1, Episode 2: They Said 'Let's Live Together'	Madge	ITV (Rediffusion)	Missing
1967	The Revenue Men	Series 2, Episode 12: Fox in the High Street	Janice Brent	BBC Two	Missing
1967	Softly, Softly	Series 3, Episode 9: The Hunt	Mrs. Forbes	BBC One	Exists
1968	Public Eye	Series 3, Episode 8: Honesty Is the Best Policy	Judy Marchmont	ITV (ABC)	Missing
1968	The Expert	Series 1, Episode 7: Nobody's Going to Hurt You	Alice Simpson	BBC Two	Missing
1969	Z-Cars	Series 6, Episode 197-198: Lost Property, Pts. 1 & 2	Mary Smith	BBC One	Missing
1969	The Borderers	Series 1, Episode 6: Stranger	Landlady	BBC Two	Exists
1969	Hardy Heating Co. Ltd.	Six of eleven episodes	Jean Wilkins	BBC One	Exists
1969	The Mind of Mr. J.G. Reeder	Series 1, Episode 1: The Treasure Hunt	Margaret Shackleton	ITV (Thames)	Exists
1969	The Gold Robbers	Series 1, Episode 2: Grounded	Fay Hartford	ITV (LWT)	Exists
1969	The Expert	Series 2, Episode 12: Do Not Go Gentle	Pat Elliot	BBC Two	Exists
1969	The Wednesday Play	Series 9, Episode 3: The Mark II Wife	Dolorea Sweeting	BBC One	Exists
1969	Detective	Series 3, Episode 7: Elimination Round	Harriet Ward	BBC One	Missing
1969	Paul Temple	Series 1, Episode 5: The Man Who Wasn't There	Enid Bray	BBC One	Missing
1970	Z-Cars	Series 6, Episodes 317-318: In and Out, Pts. 3 & 4	Fran	BBC One	Exists
1970	Manhunt	Series 1, Episode 20: Machine	Helene	ITV (LWT)	Exists
1970	Chronicle	Episode: Atatürk - Father of the Turks	Self - voice	BBC Two	Exists
1970	Special Branch	Series 2, Episode 7: Not to Be Trusted	Brenda Clifford	ITV (Thames)	Exists
1970	Thirty-Minute Theatre	Series 6, Episode 3: Did Your Nanny Come From Bergen?	Younger sister	BBC Two	Missing
1970	Menace	Series 1, Episode 6: Man with a Mission	Alice Campbell	BBC Two	Exists
1970	Ryan International	Series 1, Episode 9: The Muck Raker	Marianne	BBC One	Exists
1971	Thirty-Minute Theatre	Series 6, Episode 12: Waugh Plays Cops and Robbers	Cynthia Holmes	BBC Two	Exists
1971	ITV Sunday Night Theatre	Series 3, Episode 8: Behind the Spearmint Sign	Helen Burroway	ITV (LWT)	Exists
1971	ITV Sunday Night Drama	Episode: Turn of the Year - The Parcel	Her	ITV	Missing
1971	Shadows of Fear	Series 1, Episode 5: Repent at Leisure	Jenny	ITV (Thames)	Exists
1971	Doomwatch	Series 2, Episode 9: In the Dark	Flora Seton	BBC One	Exists
1971	Z-Cars	Series 6, Episodes 402-403: Influence, Pts. 1–2	Rachel Edmunds	BBC One	Missing
1971	Out of the Unknown	Series 4, Episode 3: This Body Is Mine	Ann Meredith	BBC Two	Exists
1971	Public Eye	Series 5, Episode 5: The Beater and the Game	Maureen	ITV (Thames)	Exists
1971	Trial	Series 1, Episode 4: On the Evidence You Will Hear	Julia Samuels	BBC Two	Missing
1971	Upstairs, Downstairs	Series 1, Episode 3: Board Wages	Enid	ITV (LWT)	Exists
1971	Play for Today	Series 2, Episode 4: O Fat White Woman	Miss Rone	BBC One	Exists
1971	The Rivals of Sherlock Holmes	Series 1, Episode 11: The Assyrian Rejuvenator	Doris Pratt	ITV (Thames)	Exists
1972	Thirty-Minute Theatre	Series 7, Episode 19: The Penthouse Apartment	Mrs. Runca	BBC Two	Missing
1972	Six Days of Justice	Series 1, Episode 5: With Intent to Deceive	Molly Foster	ITV (Thames)	Exists
1972	The Lotus Eaters	Series 1, Episode 6: A Tiger in Bristol Street	Monica Turton	BBC Two	Exists
1972	Play for Today	Series 3, Episode 8: The Bankrupt	Anne	BBC One	Exists
1973	Thriller	Series 1, Episode 3: Someone at the Top of the Stairs	Mrs. Oxhey	ITV (ATV)	Exists
1973	Away From it All	Series 1, Episode 6: The Summer House	Alice	BBC Two	Missing
1973	Sam	Series 1: All 13 episodes	Ethel Barraclough	ITV (Granada)	Exists
1973	Follyfoot	Series 3, Episode 10: The Helping Hand	Phyllis Wetherby	ITV (Yorkshire)	Exists
1974	Sam	Series 2: All 13 episodes	Ethel Barraclough	ITV (Granada)	Exists
1974	Crown Court	Series 3, Episodes 113-114: Strange Past, Pts. 2–3	Betty Tring	ITV (Granada)	Exists
1975	Sam	Series 3: All 13 episodes	Ethel Barraclough	ITV (Granada)	Exists
1976	Big Boy Now!	Series 1, Episode 7: Staff Relations	Marjorie Marchant	ITV (ATV)	Missing
1976	The Cedar Tree	Series 1, Episode 6: A Question of Values - Part 2	Mrs. Wickham	ITV (ATV)	Exists
