= Sam (1973 TV series) =

British television series

- Genre: Family drama
- Written by: John Finch
- Directed by: Colin Cant; Les Chatfield; Bill Podmore; Roland Joffé
- Starring: Mark McManus; Kevin Moreton; Barbara Ewing; Ray Smith; John Price; Frank Mills; Alethea Charlton; Michael Goodliffe; James Hazeldine; Maggie Jones; Dorothy White; Jennifer Hilary; Cherith Mellor; Jan Harvey; Ivor Roberts; Alan David; Stephanie Turner; Simon Rouse; Veronica Roberts; Peter Duncan; Windsor Davies; Jim Norton; Carol Drinkwater
- Country of origin: United Kingdom
- Original language: English
- No. of series: 3
- No. of episodes: 39

Production
- Producer: Michael Cox
- Production locations: Yorkshire; Gin Pit Village, Astley Lancashire
- Production company: Granada Television

Original release
- Network: ITV
- Release: 12 June 1973 – 25 August 1975

Sam is a television drama series written by John Finch and produced by Granada Television between 1973 and 1975 for broadcast on ITV. Finch also created and wrote A Family at War for Granada.

The series is based on fact, with Sam as a boy growing up in Featherstone. It was initially set in the coalfields of Yorkshire in the inter-war period but eventually progressed to the modern (then) era. Interior scenes were recorded at Granada's studios in Manchester, while many of the exterior scenes were filmed in Lancashire. For example, the railway station used for filming was Garswood, near Wigan. Local dialect is used, e.g. top-at-knob referring to North Featherstone. The series was made in a video/film hybrid format, which was common at the time.

== Cast ==
- Kevin Moreton as young Sam Wilson
- Mark McManus as Sam Wilson (series 2-3)
- Barbara Ewing as Dora Wilson
- Ray Smith as George Barraclough
- John Price as Alan Dakin
- Frank Mills as Toby Wilson (series 1-2)
- Alethea Charlton as Ethel Barraclough
- Michael Goodliffe as Jack Barraclough
- James Hazeldine as Frank Barraclough
- Maggie Jones
- Dorothy White as Eileen Dakin/Barraclough
- Jennifer Hilary as Sarah Corby/Wilson (series 2-3)
- Cherith Mellor as Cassie Crossman (series 2-3)
- Ivor Roberts as Arthur Corby (series 2)
- Alan David as Maurice 'Granny' Naylor (series 2-3)
- Stephanie Turner as Jessie Maugham/Naylor (series 2)
- Jan Harvey as Pat Barraclough (series 3)
- Simon Rouse as Tom Wilson (series 3)
- Veronica Roberts as Deborah Wilson (series 3)
- Peter Duncan as Chris Wilson (series 3)
- Windsor Davies as Billy Tripp (series 3)
- Jim Norton as Tad (series 3)
- Carol Drinkwater as Liz Chadwick (series 3)

== Episodes ==
Series	Episodes	Originally released	
Series	Episodes	First released	Last released
1	13	12 June 1973	4 September 1973
2	13	16 May 1974	8 August 1974
3	13	2 June 1975	25 August 1975

=== Series 1 (1973) ===
No. overall	No. in series	Title	Directed by	Written by	Original release date
1	1	"A Way of Life"	Michael Cox	John Finch	12 June 1973
Sam and his mother arrive in Skellerton and try to settle in with their relatives.
2	2	"Poor Law"	Colin Cant	John Finch	19 June 1973
The Labour Exchange is looking for Sam's mother. Sam is taken on a tour of the local pit by his grandfather.
3	3	"Leaving Home"	Les Chatfield	John Finch	26 June 1973
Sam is bullied at school. Sam's mother starts a new relationship with Alan. Sam doesn't like this and runs away.
4	4	"For Ever and Ever and Ever and Ever"	Bill Podmore	Unknown	3 July 1973
Sam is found.
5	5	"A Day to Remember"	Colin Cant, Les Chatfield	John Finch	10 July 1973
Sam is taken on a day out to the seaside.
6	6	"The Cost of Living"	Richard Doubleday	John Finch	17 July 1973
Sam's mother and new partner set up a family home.
7	7	"Out of the Blue"	Colin Cant	John Finch	24 July 1973
Sam's family come under pressure from the disapproving locals.
8	8	"United We Stand"	Les Chatfield	John Finch	31 July 1973
Sam discovers a book written by his father. The pit workers are given notice.
9	9	"The Beginning of Winter"	Les Chatfield	John Finch	7 August 1973
Sam's mother falls pregnant. Sam's father sends a letter asking for money to be sent to him so that he can come home from Canada.
10	10	"Where the Heart Is"	Colin Cant	John Finch	14 August 1973
Dora passes away in hospital giving birth to a son, Leslie. Alan, devastated, decides to go south to look for work, leaving his mother to care for the baby. Sam's uncle George goes with him.
11	11	"Home from Home"	Richard Doubleday, Alan Grint	John Finch	21 August 1973
Frank is worried about Sam's education and his grandfather wants to send him to a charity boarding school. Alan and George are disillusioned in the south and George returns home.
12	12	"No Going Back"	Bill Gilmour, Bill Podmore	John Finch	28 August 1973
Sam is at boarding school, hating it and longing to go home, but can't, because of a diphtheria outbreak in Skellerton. After a fight at the school, he runs away and walks the fifty miles home.
13	13	"Breadwinners"	Colin Cant	John Finch	4 September 1973
Sam's grandfather Toby sets up a garment factory in the old chapel, providing work for the women of Skellerton, leaving the men at home. Sam finally goes down the pit with his grandfather.

=== Series 2 (1974) ===
No. overall	No. in series	Title	Directed by	Written by	Original release date
14	1	"A New World"	Baz Taylor	John Finch	16 May 1974
15	2	"Legacy"	Les Chatfield	John Finch	23 May 1974
16	3	"Shape Yourself Round It"	Baz Taylor	John Finch	30 May 1974
17	4	"Under a Cloud"	Les Chatfield	John Finch	6 June 1974
18	5	"Head and Heart"	Alan Grint	John Finch	13 June 1974
19	6	"Stay Single and Live Forever"	Les Chatfield	John Finch	20 June 1974
20	7	"Credit"	Roland Joffé	John Finch	27 June 1974
21	8	"Sins of the Fathers"	Alan Grint	John Finch	4 July 1974
22	9	"The World as It Is"	Les Chatfield	John Finch	11 July 1974
23	10	"Land"	Roland Joffé	John Finch	18 July 1974
24	11	"Half a Loaf"	Quentin Lawrence	John Finch	25 July 1974
25	12	"Two Steps Forward, One Step Back"	Les Chatfield	John Finch	1 August 1974
26	13	"Moving On"	Roland Joffé	John Finch	8 August 1974

=== Series 3 (1975) ===
No. overall	No. in series	Title	Directed by	Written by	Original release date
27	1	"God Sent Sunday"	Michael Cox	John Finch	2 June 1975
28	2	"In the Midst of Plenty"	Quentin Lawrence	John Finch	9 June 1975
29	3	"Compensation"	Quentin Lawrence	John Finch	16 June 1975
30	4	"Bonfire Night"	Les Chatfield	John Finch	23 June 1975
31	5	"The Difference Between Us"	Les Chatfield	John Finch	30 June 1975
32	6	"What You Care Is What You Do"	Brian Mills	John Finch	7 July 1975
33	7	"Gains and Losses"	Brian Mills	John Finch	14 July 1975
34	8	"The Honest Generation"	Les Chatfield	John Finch	21 July 1975
35	9	"Opting Out"	Les Chatfield	John Finch	28 July 1975
36	10	"Home Thoughts from Abroad"	Les Chatfield	John Finch	4 August 1975
37	11	"The Next Line"	Stephen Butcher	John Finch	11 August 1975
38	12	"Proposals"	Stephen Butcher	John Finch	18 August 1975
39	13	"Ends and Means"	Roland Joffé	John Finch	25 August 1975

== Video and DVD release ==
All three series were issued by Acorn Media UK in 2003.
