= Respect (1996 film) =

- Genre: Drama
- Written by: Richard LaPlante
- Directed by: Terry Marcel
- Starring: Nick Berry; Jayne Ashbourne; Mark Addy; Dean Williamson; Rachel Roberts; Nicholas Ball; Carol Harrison; Garey Bridges
- Country of origin: United Kingdom
- Original language: English

Production
- Executive producer: Keith Richardson
- Producer: Peter Waller
- Editor: Terry Warwick
- Running time: 90 minutes
- Production company: Yorkshire Television

Original release
- Network: ITV
- Release: 17 December 1996

Respect is a single British television drama film, written by Richard LaPlante and directed by Terry Marcel, that first broadcast on 17 December 1996 on ITV. The film stars Nick Berry as Bobby Carr and is based on the early years in the life of notorious East London villain Ray Barton, a professional boxer who is forced to retire from the sport after receiving a serious eye injury during a fight. He attempts to make money through a nightclub scam, but his illegal activities are soon discovered and he is sentenced to community service, where he is forced to teach boxing to teenagers at a local youth club. Scripts for a follow-up to the film were blocked after lengthy court proceedings during which Barton's lawyers also ordered the original film be withdrawn from public sale.

Jayne Ashbourne, Mark Addy, Dean Williamson, Rachel Victoria Roberts, Nicholas Ball, Carol Harrison and Garey Bridges are also credited as principal members of the cast. The majority of the film was shot at Shepperton Studios. The film was released on VHS on 27 March 2000 as a double-header with another of Berry's television films, Paparazzo.

== Cast ==
- Nick Berry as Bobby Carr
- Jayne Ashbourne as Rosie Carr
- Mark Addy as Joe Carr
- Dean Williamson as Trevor Nye
- Rachel Victoria Roberts as Janine
- Nicholas Ball as Ronnie Ellis
- Carol Harrison as Veronica
- Garey Bridges as Billy Price
- Philip Woodford as Stephen Ruther
- Adam Searles as Kevin Murphy
- Karl Moffatt as John Simpson
- Kenneth Cope as Stan Peters
- Nicholas Beveney as Ralph Grandistone
- Paul Kember as Tipper Donovan
- Graham Bryan as Oliver Wright
- Lee MacDonald as Danny Phillips
