= Mr. T's Commandments =

EP by Mr. T
- Released: 1984
- Recorded: 1983–1984
- Genre: Hip hop
- Length: 29:56
- Label: Columbia/CBS
- Producer: Patrick Henderson

Professional ratings
Review scores
| Source | Rating |
|---|---|
| Punknews.org | 1.5/5 stars |

Mr. T's Commandments is a hip hop EP for children, released in 1984. In it, Mr. T guides the youth of America with lessons on love, not talking to strangers, honoring parents, doing homework, and saying no to drug use.

The album's lead single, "Mr. T's Commandment," was released in 1984. It peaked at #75 on the Billboard Hot R&B/Hip Hop Songs chart.

== Track listing ==
1. "Mr. T's Commandment" - 4:59
2. "Don't Talk to Strangers" - 5:12
3. "The Toughest Man in the World" - 3:55
4. "Mr. T, Mr. T (He Was Made for Love)" - 3:21
5. "The One and Only Mr. T" - 4:46
6. "No Dope No Drugs" - 4:36
7. "You Got to Go Through It" - 4:27

== Personnel ==
- Paul Jackson Jr. - Guitar
- John Van Tongeren - Keyboards, Linn drum, Guitar
- Patrick Henderson - Producer, Keyboards
- Afrika Islam - turntables (tracks: 2, 3, 5, 6)
- Ice-T - Rap Direction (tracks 2, 3, 6, 7).
- Howard Smith - Vocals (track 2)
- Tata Vega - Vocals (track 4)
