= Touch of Death (1961 film) =

British film by Lance Comfort

- British quad poster
- Directed by: Lance Comfort
- Written by: Lyn Fairhurst; Aubrey Cash and Wilfred Josephs (story)
- Produced by: Lewis Linzee
- Starring: William Lucas; David Sumner; Ray Barrett; Jan Waters
- Cinematography: Basil Emmott
- Edited by: John Trumper
- Music by: Johnny Douglas
- Production company: Helion Pictures
- Distributed by: Planet Film Distributors
- Release date: 1961 (UK)
- Running time: 58 minutes
- Country: United Kingdom
- Language: English

Touch of Death is a 1961 black and white British second feature crime film directed by Lance Comfort and starring William Lucas, David Sumner, Ray Barrett and Jan Waters. It was written by Lyn Fairhurst from a story by Aubrey Cash and Wilfred Josephs.

== Premise ==
A criminal gang pull off a big robbery, unaware the cash has been infected with toxic poison. The thieves hide out on a Thames houseboat and terrorise its female occupant, before they start dying.

== Cast ==
- William Lucas as Pete Mellor
- David Sumner as Len Williams
- Ray Barrett as Maxwell
- Jan Waters as Jackie
- Frank Coda as Sgt. Byrne
- Roberta Tovey as Pam
- Geoffrey Denton as Baxter
- Lane Meddick as Morgan
- Ann Martin as Mrs. Morgan
- Christopher Brett as Mike
- Clifford Earl as Mr. Grey
- Alethea Charlton as Mrs. Grey

== Critical reception ==
The Monthly Film Bulletin wrote: "In an effort to ring the changes on the usual crime and punishment formula, the script overloads the tale with suspenseful possibilities that strain the credibility. But it creates a nice sense of urgency, and the direction, though not particularly original, keeps the action going at a lively pace. The characterisation of the two crooks gives those two good actors, William Lucas and David Sumner, something to bite on, and some tedious playing in the minor roles does not weigh too heavily on the rest of this able little second feature."

AllMovie wrote, "Director Lance Comfort wasn't what you could call inspired, but he sure knew how to sustain audience interest."
