= I Pity the Fool (TV series) =

- Created by: Mr. T
- Starring: Mr. T
- Country of origin: United States
- Original language: English
- No. of episodes: 6

Production
- Executive producers: Stephen Belafonte; Ken Druckerman
- Running time: 22–24 minutes
- Production companies: Lionsgate Television; Left/Right Productions

Original release
- Network: TV Land
- Release: October 11 – November 15, 2006

I Pity the Fool is a 2006 American reality television series starring Mr. T, originally airing on TV Land.

== Premise ==
The series features Mr. T traveling from town to town giving advice, solving problems and teaching individuals some basic life rules. He mainly gives advice about playing fair and maintaining a good team spirit. The name of the show comes from Mr. T's catch phrase from Rocky III where he played the character James "Clubber" Lang. The show lasted for only six episodes.

== Episodes ==
No.	Title	Original release date	Prod. code
1	"Motivation"	October 11, 2006	101
Mr. T is tasked with motivating the employees of a New York car dealership and improving the relationship of a father and son-in-law who are working together.
2	"Trust"	October 18, 2006	102
Mr. T goes to help parents and children at a dance school improve their trust in each other so they can prepare for an upcoming dance recital.
3	"Unity"	October 25, 2006	103
Mr. T is called to help the Abato family develop some unity because the family is falling apart.
4	"Respect"	November 1, 2006	104
Mr. T goes out to a family horse farm where he helps the Layden parents to teach their four rough teenage sons some respect. Gloucester County 4-H Family
5	"Leadership"	November 8, 2006	105
Mr. T heads to a real estate agent in Brooklyn which has little direction and sets out to teach the owner some leadership skills.
6	"Communication"	November 15, 2006	106
Mr. T visits a restaurant where the fighting of the owner, chef, and staff are threatening to sink the business, and works at teaching them about good communication.
