= L. P. Davies =

British writer

Leslie Purnell Davies (20 October 1914 – 6 January 1988) was a British novelist whose works typically combine elements of horror, science fiction and mystery. He also wrote many short stories under several pseudonyms, including: L. Purnell Davies, Leo Berne, Richard Bridgeman, Morgan Evans, Ian Jefferson, Lawrence Phillips, Thomas Philips, G. K. Thomas, Leslie Vardre, and Rowland Welch.

== Themes ==
Davies' books often deal with the manipulation of human consciousness, and in some ways are comparable to the works of Philip K. Dick. (The premise of The Artificial Man resembles that of Dick's Time Out of Joint.) His protagonists frequently suffer from amnesia or other loss of identity, and their quest to find out who they really are drives the plot.

== Film adaptations ==
Davies' novels The Artificial Man (1965) and Psychogeist (1966) were adapted into the 1968 film Project X, and The Alien (1968) was loosely adapted into the 1972 film The Groundstar Conspiracy. The Paper Dolls (1964) was adapted by Hammer as an episode ("Paper Dolls") of its television series Journey to the Unknown (1968).

== Personal life ==
Davies worked as a pharmacist, postmaster, optometrist, and gift shop owner, and served in the Royal Army Medical Corps in France, Italy and North Africa.

== Critical evaluation ==
A critical essay on Davies' novels can be found in S. T. Joshi's The Evolution of the Weird Tale (2004).

== Novels ==
- The Paper Dolls (1964)
- Man Out of Nowhere (1965; published in the US in 1966 as Who Is Lewis Pinder?)
- The Artificial Man (1965)
- Psychogeist (1966)
- Tell it to the Dead (1966, under the pseudonym Leslie Vardre; published in the US in 1967 as The Reluctant Medium under the author's real name)
- Twilight Journey (1967)
- The Lampton Dreamers (1967)
- The Nameless Ones (1967; published in the US in 1968 as A Grave Matter)
- The Alien (1968)
- Dimension A (1969)
- Genesis Two (1969)
- Stranger to Town (1969)
- The White Room (1969)
- Adventure Holidays Ltd. (1970)
- The Shadow Before (1970)
- Give Me Back Myself (1971)
- What Did I Do Tomorrow? (1972)
- Assignment Abacus (1975)
- Possession (1976)
- The Land of Leys (1979)
- Morning Walk (1983)

== Short Story Collection ==
- Shadows Before: The London Mystery Stories of L.P. Davies (2 vols., Ramble House, 2021)

== See also ==
- List of horror fiction authors
