= Kevin Moreton =

English actor (born 1959)

- Born: 19 January 1959 (age 67); Hemsworth, West Riding of Yorkshire, England
- Occupation: Actor
- Years active: 1973–1980

Kevin Moreton (born 19 January 1959) is an English actor, best known for his portrayal of 'Sam' in the Granada Television drama of the same name. He also appeared in Coronation Street as 'Kevin Marsh'. He was a popular British child actor during the 1970s and appeared in many roles.

== Early life ==
Moreton was born in 1959 in Hemsworth, a small mining town in the West Riding of Yorkshire, England. He was brought up and lived in a small village named Carleton, in Pontefract and attended his local school, at the time known as Pontefract Boys' School, now named Carleton Community High School. He was put forward and selected for his first TV role by his school drama teacher, Trevor Lunn, who had past contacts in the industry. One of the adult actors and one of the child actors from The Flaxton Boys also came from the same school in Carleton.

== Acting career ==
Moreton's first TV appearance was in ITV Granada's drama series Sam, which ran from 1973 to 1975. In this social drama he played a young boy called Sam Wilson who lived in a fictional Yorkshire mining village, Skellerton, in 1934. Moreton was replaced in Series Two and Three by Mark McManus who played the older Sam after the storyline jumped from the 1930s to the 1950s.

The opening scene of Sam, which shows a young Sam running up the pit fields, was filmed in Featherstone near Pontefract, West Yorkshire. Moreton obtained permission from his school to work in the series, and during filming his education was continued by a private tutor. He was paid £900 for playing Sam.

He also starred as William Dalby in the British film It Shouldn't Happen to a Vet in 1975, directed by Eric Till.

His most memorable acting role to many was as the character 'Kevin Marsh' in Coronation Street. His character is remembered for wrecking Ken Barlow's house and subsequently burning down Mark Brittain's warehouse in 1975.

Moreton always played a main character, apart from his cameo appearance on Open All Hours in a 1976 episode titled "Beware of the Dog" as a cocky young boy showing who's boss to Arkwright, the tight fisted shop owner.

Moreton starred in the BBC Children's TV series Striker. The show ran for two series on the BBC from 1975 to 1976 and was written by actor Kenneth Cope. Moreton played the title role, young Ben Dyker, the star forward of the Brenton youth team. Other notable cast members included Joe Gladwin as Harry, Sam Williams as Nicky and Arthur White as Mr Robson.

Moreton played an orphan child ghost called "Nobody" in the made-for-children Tyne Tees Television series Nobody's House, which aired for seven 25-minute episodes in 1976.

In late 1975 Moreton played the lead role in a play at the Royal Court Theatre called Runaway whose cast included Bill Owen.

In 1977 Moreton played the character of "Raymond" in the Granada Television children's TV series "The Ghosts of Motley Hall", the episode was called "Ghost of a Chance" (series 2, episode 5).

Later that year he went on to star in the lead role in a play at a small theatre in Shepherd's Bush by Paul Copley.

Also in 1977 he starred in a three part episode of Crown Court called "Street Gang", playing Ian Parker. He subsequently appeared as Gerald in the series Centre Play, in the episode "Auntie Kathleen's Old Clothes".

=== Voiceover work ===
In 1979–80 Moreton did a TV advert voiceover for tea manufacturer and distributor Tetley. His character was known as "the Apprentice", one of many animated characters used to advertise Tetley Tea from 1973 to 2001. Collectively these characters were known as the Tetley Tea Folk, in a series of adverts that combined animation with live action. The characters' voices were supplied by some distinguished actors throughout the campaign, including "Gaffer's" Brian Glover and "Sydney" George Layton.

== Personal life ==
Moreton is married to Lesley, whom he met in 1987. They have two children (boys) and live in West Yorkshire.
