= Jennifer Hilary =

British actress (1942–2008)

- Born: Jennifer Mary Hilary; 14 December 1942; Frimley, England
- Died: 6 August 2008 (aged 65); London, England
- Education: RADA
- Occupation: Actress
- Years active: 1961–2007

Jennifer Mary Hilary (14 December 1942 – 6 August 2008) was a British actress of stage, film and television. Her first acclaimed stage performance was as "Milly" in Henry James' The Wings of the Dove, which marked her debut in the West End.

== Career ==
Born at Frimley, Camberley, Surrey, she trained at RADA, and began her acting career with the Liverpool Playhouse in April 1961, aged 18. Her first role was as Nina in The Seagull. She would go on to play such characters as Lady Teazle (The School for Scandal), Isabel (The Enchanted), Cilla Curtis (Amateur Means Lover) and Cecily Cardew (The Importance of Being Earnest). She went on to act with the Birmingham Repertory Theatre.

She debuted across the pond in 1963, performing in Jean Anouilh's The Rehearsal. In 1964, she played "Zoe" in the West End production of James Saunders' A Scent of Flowers. Sir Michael Redgrave included her in the cast of Turgenev's A Month in the Country in 1965. She returned to New York to play the doomed "Sasha" in Chekhov's Ivanov at the Shubert Theatre in 1966. Back in London, she played "Ginny" in the hit 1967 production of Alan Ayckbourn's Relatively Speaking.

== Later years and death ==
Later in life she founded a flower-arranging business. In 2001, she provided the floral arrangements for actor Michael Williams's memorial service at Covent Garden.

Hilary died from cancer in London on 6 August 2008, at the age of 65.

== Awards ==
In 1961 she was awarded the Bancroft Gold Medal.

== Filmography ==
=== Film ===
Year	Title	Role	Notes
1964	Becket	Peasant's Daughter	
1965	The Heroes of Telemark	Sigrid	
1966	The Idol	Sarah	
1971	One Brief Summer	Jennifer	
1980	North Sea Hijack	Sarah	
1982	Five Days One Summer	Sarah Meredith	
1989	Slipstream	Girl's Mother	

=== Television ===
Year	Title	Role	Notes
1961	Deadline Midnight	Girl	1 episode
1966	The Woman in White	Laura Fairlie / Anne Catherick	Main role
1967	ITV Play of the Week	Jacqueline	"A Roof Over Our Mouths"
1968	Journey to the Unknown	Anne Prentiss	"The New People"
1969	The Wednesday Play	Gilly Atkinson	"Dr. Atkinson's Daughter"
1969	The Gold Robbers	Stephanie Conroy	"Rough Trade"
1969	Department S	Comtesse de Noverre	"Death on Reflection"
1969	Happy Ever After		"The Woman at the Door"
1969	ITV Sunday Night Theatre	Wendy / Sandra	"Pig in a Poke", "Two Feet Off the Ground"
1970	ITV Sunday Night Theatre	Zo	"Jennie", "Emma", "Zo"
1971	Out of the Unknown	Penny Bowers	"Welcome Home"
1971	A Family at War	Jill Robbins	"Breaking Point", "The Lost Ones"
1972	Jason King	Myra Borgen	"If it's Got to Go – It's Got to Go"
1973	The Man in the Wood	Betty Hardy	TV film
1974	Late Night Drama		"Better at Murder"
1974–75	Sam	Sarah Wilson	Main role
1977	Z-Cars	Val Murray	"Guilt"
1977	Play for Today	Davina	"Charades"
1978	Crown Court	Lynne Hanson	"In the Heat of the Moment: Part 1"
1978	The Sunday Drama	Lucy	"Alphabetical Order"
1980	Tales of the Unexpected	Wendy	"The Umbrella Man"
1980	The Gentle Touch	Elaine Lawson	"Maggie's Luck"
1980	Play for Today	Mrs. Champing	"The Adventures of Frank: Parts 1 & 2"
1981	Jackanory	Blanche	"Alice Through The..."
1981	Winston Churchill: The Wilderness Years	Goonie	"In High Places"
1982	BBC2 Playhouse	Geraldine	"Lunch"
1983	All for Love	Miss Martin	"Miss A and Miss M"
1984	The Hello Goodbye Man	Dr. Sally Newbolt	"1.5"
1984	The Sun Also Rises	Frances Clyne	TV miniseries
1985	Me and My Girl	Laura Tindle	"Picture of Harmony"
1988	Double First	Louise Hobson	TV series
1991	Stay Lucky	Police Inspector	"Shingle Beach"
1994	Pie in the Sky	Anne Hopkinson	"Undesirable Elements"
1995	Zoya	Tsarina	TV film
1995	Bliss	Tamara Bancroft	TV film
1999	Midsomer Murders	Sarah Fitzroy	"Death of a Stranger"
2007	Doctors	Clare Harris	"Once Bitten", (final television appearance)
