= Arthur Lavis =

British cinematographer

- Born: 14 June 1924; Plymouth, Devon, United Kingdom
- Died: 15 January 1999 (aged 74); Ely, Cambridgeshire, United Kingdom
- Occupation: Cinematographer
- Years active: 1956-1989 (film)

Arthur Lavis (1924–1999) was a British cinematographer of film and television.

== Selected filmography ==
- Private Potter (1962)
- The Barber of Stamford Hill (1962)
- A Matter of Choice (1963)
- Night Train to Paris (1964)
- The Horror of It All (1964)
- Do You Know This Voice? (1964)
- The Earth Dies Screaming (1964)
- Ring of Spies (1964)
- Joey Boy (1965)
- Catacombs (1965)
- The Penthouse (1967)
- Ten Little Indians (1989)

== Bibliography ==
- Fellner, Chris. The Encyclopedia of Hammer Films. Rowman & Littlefield, 2019.
