= Everybody's Free =

Everybody's Free may refer to:

- "Everybody's Free (To Feel Good)", a 1991 single by Zimbabwean singer Rozalla
- Everybody's Free (album), a 1992 album by Rozalla
- "Everybody's Free (To Wear Sunscreen)", a 1999 single by Australian film director Baz Luhrmann
