= This Time I Found Love =

1994 single by Rozalla

Single by Rozalla

from the album Look No Further
- Released: July 1994
- Genre: Dance-pop; house; techno
- Length: 3:40
- Label: Sony
- Songwriters: Jacobs; St Louis
- Producer: Stuart Crichton

Rozalla singles chronology
| "I Love Music" (1993) | "This Time I Found Love" (1994) | "You Never Love The Same Way Twice" (1994) |

Music video
- "This Time I Found Love" on YouTube

"This Time I Found Love" is a song by Zambian-born singer Rozalla, released in July 1994 by Sony Records as the second single from her second album, Look No Further (1995). It was produced by Grammy-nominated music producer/songwriter Stuart Crichton and later also included on her Best Of album. The song reached number 33 on the UK Singles Chart and stayed in the top-40 for two weeks. It was also released in some other countries, including Germany, with little success.

== Critical reception ==
Upon the release, Larry Flick from Billboard magazine felt the "bracing" song "will leave familiar techno-pop skids all over the dancefloor, it is only one of many styles successfully explored here [on the album]." A reviewer from Music & Media wrote, "Since 1991's 'Everybody's Free (To Feel Good)' the Zimbabwian has failed to come up with as strong a single, until this one with all the cheerfulness pop dance records should have." Alan Jones from Music Week said, "Not wholly successful in its pre-release club trials, and considerably less obviously hitbound than her early Pulse 8 hits, this is nonetheless a happy house anthem that will find enough buyers to save face."

James Hamilton of the Record Mirror Dance Update named it a "diva-like joyful galloper" in his weekly dance column. Al Weisel from Rolling Stone stated that the "scorching techno beat" on 'This Time I Found Love' "will have dance floors skirting fure-code regulations." Tony Cross from Smash Hits gave the song a full score of five out of five, writing, "If there was a happy house heaven, this is what would greet you at the pumping pearly gates. Rozalla has created a club classic that's as perfect on the dancefloor as it is on your stereo."

== Music video ==
The accompanying music video for "This Time I Found Love" was directed by Katie Bell and produced by Susan Pluckrose for Excess. It was released on 25 July 1994 and is a stylised studio shoot on 35mm.

== Charts ==
| Chart (1994) | Peak position |
|---|---|
| Scotland (OCC) | 31 |
| UK Singles (OCC) | 33 |
| UK Dance (OCC) | 31 |
| UK Airplay (Music Week) | 35 |
| UK Dance (Music Week) | 31 |
| UK Club Chart (Music Week) | 41 |
