= Are You Ready to Fly =

1992 single by Rozalla

Single by Rozalla

from the album Everybody's Free
- Released: 10 February 1992
- Genre: House; breakbeat
- Length: 3:55
- Label: Pulse 8
- Songwriters: Nigel Swanston; Tim Cox
- Producer: Band of Gypsies

Rozalla singles chronology
"Faith (In the Power of Love)" (1990)	"Are You Ready to Fly" (1992)	"I Love Music" (1993)

Music video
- "Are You Ready to Fly" on YouTube

"Are You Ready to Fly" is a song by Zambian-born singer Rozalla, released in February 1992 by label Pulse 8 as a single from her second album, Everybody's Free (1992). The song was written by Nigel Swanston and Tim Cox, and produced by Band of Gypsies. It achieved a certain success in many countries, including the United States, where it topped the Billboard Hot Dance Club Play chart. The single reached number 14 on the UK Singles Chart and was also a hit across continental Europe, peaking within the top five in Belgium, Denmark and Spain. New York City-based director Ed Steinberg directed its music video. The song won an award in the category "Best Single of the Year" on the 1993 Hi-NRG Music Awards in New York.

In 1995, the song was covered by German happy hardcore band Dune with reasonable success in Germany, Switzerland and the Netherlands.

== Critical reception ==
Larry Flick from Billboard magazine wrote, "The furor surrounding Rozalla's No. 1 hit, 'Everybody's Free', has hardly started to subside, and she launches into an equally delightful trip into the realm between rave and hi-NRG." He noted further that the song "benefits from a plethora of strong remixes that work just about every format angle imaginable. An instant club smash." Amy Linden from Entertainment Weekly described it as "incandescent". A reviewer from Music & Media commented that "the Zimbabwean singer takes off for another flight to the top. This third single in her bouncing pop/dance style completes her hat trick."

Andy Beevers from Music Week stated that the song "is in much the same vein" as "Faith (In the Power of Love)" and "Everybody's Free (To Feel Good)". James Hamilton from the Record Mirror Dance Update deemed it "another Yazz-style smoothly soaring and shuffling galloper". Charles Aaron from Spin found that "the beats are really, really fast and the synths occasionally sinister, so this is technicially techno, but it's more like soul salvation raving in the wilderness." Sylvia Patterson from Smash Hits called it a "hugely merrily Italo-House piano-filled frollicker not unlike 'Everybody's Free' except slightly less manic and even more singable."

== Track listings ==
- 7" single
1. "Are You Ready to Fly" (rainbow mix) — 3:55
2. "Are You Ready to Fly" (marauder a cappella edit) — 3:57
- 12" maxi
1. "Are You Ready to Fly" (rainbow mix) — 6:55
2. "Are You Ready to Fly" (marauder a cappella mix) — 6:10
3. "Are You Ready to Fly" (tekno mix) — 6:49
4. "Are You Ready to Fly" (marauder mix) — 7:24
- CD single
1. "Are You Ready to Fly" (rainbow mix) — 3:55
2. "Are You Ready to Fly" (marauder a cappella edit) — 3:57
- CD maxi
1. "Are You Ready to Fly" (rainbox mix radio edit) — 3:55
2. "Are You Ready to Fly" (marauder a cappella) — 6:10
3. "Are You Ready to Fly" (kaleidoscope mix) — 6:40
4. "Are You Ready to Fly" (kalimba mix) — 7:05

== Charts ==
=== Weekly charts ===
Chart (1992)	Peak position
Australia (ARIA)	88
Austria (Ö3 Austria Top 40)	21
Belgium (Ultratop 50 Flanders)	5
Canada Dance/Urban (RPM)	2
Denmark (IFPI)	5
Europe (Eurochart Hot 100)	17
Europe (European Dance Radio)	4
Finland (Suomen virallinen lista)	9
France (SNEP)	11
Germany (GfK)	25
Ireland (IRMA)	16
Israel (Israeli Singles Chart)	8
Italy (Musica e dischi)	9
Netherlands (Dutch Top 40)	32
Netherlands (Single Top 100)	26
Spain (AFYVE)	4
Sweden (Sverigetopplistan)	15
Switzerland (Schweizer Hitparade)	6
UK Singles (Official Charts)	14
UK Airplay (Music Week)	16
UK Dance (Music Week)	17
UK Club Chart (Music Week)	2
US Bubbling Under Hot 100 Singles (Billboard)	6
US Dance Club Play (Billboard)	1
US Maxi-Singles Sales (Billboard)	1
US Top 40 Radio Monitor (Billboard)	63
Zimbabwe (ZIMA)	6

=== Year-end charts ===
Chart (1992)	Position
Belgium (Ultratop)	40
Europe (European Dance Radio)	10
Germany (Media Control)	100
Switzerland (Schweizer Hitparade)	29
UK Club Chart (Music Week)	64

Chart (1993)	Position
Canada Dance/Urban (RPM)	38
US Maxi-Singles Sales (Billboard)	35

== Appearance in other media ==
The song was used in the TV commercial of the NBA in 1993, featuring Michael Jordan, Harold Miner, Shawn Kemp, Clyde Drexler and others.

== Cover versions ==
The song was covered by German happy hardcore band Dune in 1995 with reasonable success in Germany, Switzerland and the Netherlands.

American songwriter, record producer and remixer Jason Nevins remixed the song for his 2003 album.
