= The Sound of San Francisco =

Single by Global Deejays

from the album Network
- Released: 29 November 2004
- Genre: Electro house
- Length: 5:42
- Label: Superstar

Global Deejays singles chronology
"The Sound of San Francisco" (2004)	"What a Feeling (Flashdance)" (2005)

"The Sound of San Francisco" (or "San Francisco Dreaming'") is a song by the Austrian house group Global Deejays. It was released in November 2004 as the lead single from their album, Network. The song was one of the first Austrian dance songs to reach the top ten of more than 10 charts worldwide.

It samples the Scott McKenzie song "San Francisco (Be Sure to Wear Flowers in Your Hair)".

== Music video ==
The music video for the song is the group in a school bus as they tour the list of cities listed at the beginning of the song.

== Chart performance ==
=== Weekly charts ===
Chart (2004–2005)	Peak position
Austria (Ö3 Austria Top 40)	4
Belgium (Ultratop 50 Flanders)	38
Belgium (Ultratip Bubbling Under Wallonia)	9
Canada (Nielsen SoundScan)	3
CIS Airplay (TopHit)	1
Czech Republic (Rádio Top 100 Oficiální)	1
France (SNEP)	18
Germany (GfK)	3
Hungary (Dance Top 40)	1
Hungary (Editors' Choice Top 40)	21
Netherlands (Dutch Top 40)	31
Russia Airplay (TopHit)	1
Switzerland (Schweizer Hitparade)	29
U.S. Billboard Hot Dance Club Play	5

=== Year-end charts ===
Chart (2004)	Position
CIS (TopHit)	92

Chart (2005)	Position
CIS (TopHit)	22
Germany (Media Control GfK)	32
Russia Airplay (TopHit)	35
