= Petite fille =

1967 single by Johnny Hallyday

Single by Johnny Hallyday

from the album Johnny 67
- Language: French
- English title: Little Girl
- Released: 28 August 1967
- Genre: Psychedelic rock
- Length: 2:35
- Label: Philips
- Songwriters: Micky Jones & Tommy Brown, Georges Aber

Johnny Hallyday singles chronology
"Amour d'été" (1967)	"Petite fille" (1967)	"San Francisco" (1967)

Music video
- "Petite fille" (live in Lyon, 1968) on YouTube

"Julien Waites"

Single by State of Micky & Tommy
- Released: 28 December 1967
- Recorded: Late 1967
- Genre: Psychedelic rock
- Length: 2:27
- Label: Mercury
- Songwriters: Micky Jones, Tommy Brown

Audio
- "Julien Waites" on YouTube

"Petite fille" (transl. "Little Girl") is a song by French singer Johnny Hallyday. It was released in August 1967 on an EP and also appeared on Hallyday's that year's album Johnny 67.

== Writing and composition ==
The song was written for Johnny Hallyday by Micky Jones and Tommy Brown, respectively the guitarist and the drummer in Hallyday's accompanying band. The French lyrics were written by Georges Aber.

== Track listing ==
7-inch EP Philips 437.371 (1967, France, Belgium, etc.)

A1. "Petite fille" (2:39)
A2. "Je n'ai jamais rien demandé" (2:52)
B1. "C'est mon imagination" (3:08)
B2. "Lettre de fans" (2:15)

7-inch single Philips 373,989 (1967, Canada)

A. "Petite fille" ("Julien Waites")
B. "Aussi dur que du bois" ("Knock on Wood")

7-inch promo single Philips B 370.462 F (1967, France)

A. "Petite fille"
B. "Pourquoi as-tu peur de la vie"

== Charts ==
Chart (1967)	Peak position
Belgium (Ultratop 50 Wallonia)	10

== English version ==
In the same year 4 months later, Jones and Brown (as the band State of Micky & Tommy) released the song in English (under the title "Julien Waites").
