= Look No Further =

Second album (1995) by Zambian electronic dance music performer Rozalla

Studio album by Rozalla
- Released: 1995
- Recorded: 1993–1995
- Genre: Dance; funk; soul; pop
- Label: Epic
- Producer: Neal Slateford; Neil Davidge

Rozalla chronology
| Everybody's Free (1992) | Look No Further (1995) | Coming Home (1998) |

Professional ratings
Review scores
| Source | Rating |
|---|---|
| The Advocate | (favorable) |
| AllMusic | 2.5/5 stars |
| Billboard | (favorable) |
| Encyclopedia of Popular Music | 3/5 stars |
| Entertainment Weekly | A− |
| Music & Media | (favorable) |
| Rolling Stone | 3/5 stars |
| Smash Hits | 3/5 stars |
| Spin | (mixed) |

Look No Further is the second album by Zambian electronic dance music performer Rozalla, released in 1995 by Epic Records. The album was produced by Neal Slateford and Neil Davidge, and includes her four hit singles "I Love Music", "This Time I Found Love", "You Never Love the Same Way Twice" and "Baby", as well as a cover of "Losing My Religion" by R.E.M.

== Critical reception ==
The album was well received among music critics. Barry Walters from The Advocate wrote, "Rozalla takes a far more catholic approach, tackling house music, disco, R&B, sleaze, and hi-NRG, all without abandoning her club roots." He complimented the singers' "dramatic dance reinterpration" of R.E.M.'s 'Losing My Religion', as well as "respectful renderings" of 'I Love Music' and 'I Don't Even Know If I Should Call You Baby'. He concluded, "More important, the new compositions are every bit as compelling." Larry Flick from Billboard magazine felt "Rozalla excels on uptempo jams like the sweeping 'You Never Love the Same Way Twice' and the giddy 'Work Me', as well as on lush'n'lovely slower tracks like 'Do You Believe' and the title cut. Prepare for a musical trip."

Another Billboard editor, Paul Verna, named it "a richly diverse, smartly song-driven collection that comfortably places radio-friendly pop/R&B tunes with the expected dance fare." He remarked that "she displays a newly broadened vocal range, as well as a far more interesting phrasing style." Adele Sulcas from Elle named Rozalla a "killer-vocal dance diva". Dimitri Ehrlich from Entertainment Weekly described it as a "club-friendly second album, which hopscotches from ecumenical dance to belly-rubbing soul with laid-back virtuosity." Music & Media wrote, "She has really matured" is one of record executives' most used clichés. But believe us, it is true here. [...] 'If Love Is a Dream' with its high pop and swing quotient is our favourite." Al Weisel from Rolling Stone remarked the fact that two songs, "Work Me" and "Do You Believe", were written by Rozalla, viewing them among the best tracks on the album, "proving once again that a talented female singer isn't necessarily the mouthpiece of her producers."

== Track listing ==
1. "I Love Music" – 4:02
2. "You Never Love the Same Way Twice" – 4:23
3. "This Time I Found Love" – 3:46
4. "Baby" – 4:05
5. "Look No Further" – 4:17
6. "Do You Believe" – 4:30
7. "Work Me" – 4:08
8. "If Love Is a Dream" – 4:35
9. "All That I Need" – 4:00
10. "Love Work" – 3:48
11. "I Can't Wait" – 4:12
12. "Losing My Religion" – 4:30
13. "I Love Music" (Roger's Uplifting Club Mix) – 6:05
14. "Baby" (Love To Infinity's Deep Love Mix) – 6:37
15. "You Never Love the Same Way Twice" (K-Klass Klub Mix) – 7:11

== Charts ==
| Chart (1995) | Peak position |
|---|---|
| UK Albums (OCC) | 138 |
