= Global Deejays =

Austrian tech house DJ team

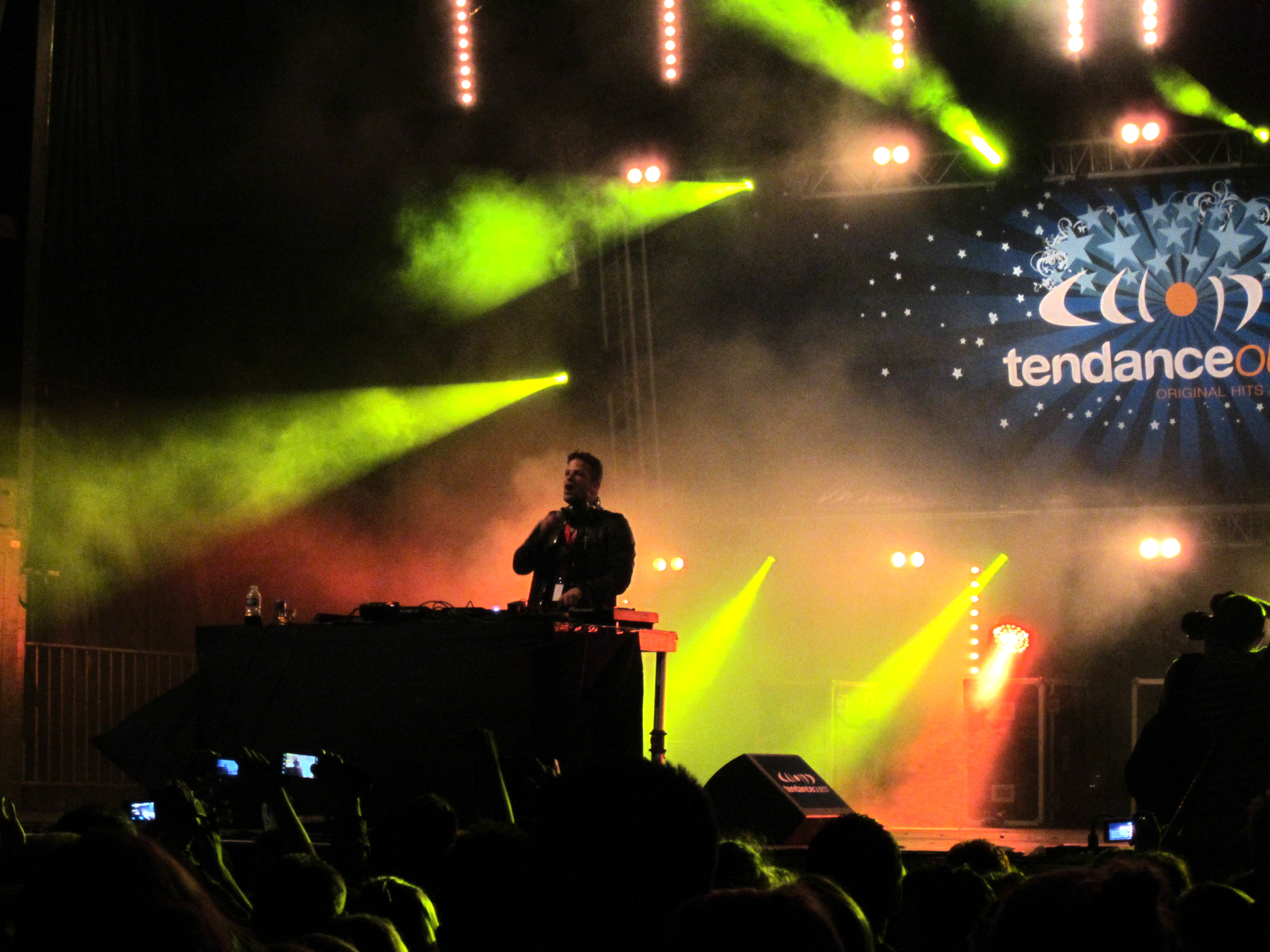

Background information
- Origin: Austria
- Genres: House, electro house, Eurodance
- Years active: 2004–present
- Members: DJ Taylor (Konrad Schreyvogl); DJ Mikkel (Mikkel Christensen); FLOw (Florian Schreyvogl)
- Website: www.global-deejays.com

Global Deejays (also known as Global Playboyz and Ravers on Dope) are an Austrian tech house DJ team composed of DJ Taylor (Konrad Schreyvogl) and FLOw (Florian Schreyvogl). Their first three singles were popular in Europe.

== Musical career ==
The group's track "The Sound of San Francisco" partially samples the 1967 song "San Francisco (Be Sure to Wear Flowers in Your Hair)" by The Summer of Love. The video includes scenes of the band in a decorated school bus driving through popular destinations.

In 2005 the Global Deejays won both the Russian MTV Energy Award and the Polish ESKA Award.

In 2008 DJ Mikkel (Mikkel Christensen) left the group.

January 26, 2009 saw the remixed version of the group's "Everybody's Free (To Feel Good)" debut on the Australian ARIA Charts at number 33 (eventually hitting #7). This popularity was the result of the track featuring in television commercials for the Australian version of So You Think You Can Dance that summer.

April 2010 saw the Global Deejays release "My Friend" with the vocal talents of Danish singer Ida Corr.

April 2011 saw the Global Deejays' release "Bring It Back" reach #8 in the official US Billboard Dance chart. The track features Niels Van Gogh, and the vocals of house diva, Terri B! aka Terri Bjerre.

January 2012 saw the Global Deejays' cover of Dune "Hardcore Vibes" peak at #46 on the French Top 100.

== Discography ==
=== Albums ===
Year	Title	AUT	FRA
2005	Network	66	45

=== Singles / Maxis ===
Year	Title	AUT	AUS	CAN	CZE	FRA	GER	NED	RUS	SPA	SWI	UKN	U.S. Dance
2004	"The Sound of San Francisco"	4	—	3	1	18	3	31	1	1	25	1	5
2005	"What a Feeling (Flashdance)"	14	44	—	7	18	16	35	9	1	45	10	5
2006	"Don't Stop (Me Now)"	—	—	—	—	—	—	—	—	—	—	—	—
2006	"Stars on 45"	—	—	—	—	—	12	—	49	8	—	—	—
2006	"Mr Funk"	—	—	—	—	—	—	—	—	—	—	115	—
2007	"Get Up! (Before the Night Is Over)" (vs. Technotronic)	—	—	32	—	32	—	—	—	—	—	1	—
2007	"Zelenoglazoe Taksi" (Oleg Kvasha's "Green-Eyed Taxi" cover)	—	—	—	—	—	—	—	5	—	—	—	—
2007	"Everybody's Free" (featuring Rozalla)	—	7	—	—	—	—	70	—	—	—	—	—
2009	"Everybody's Free (2009)" (featuring Rozalla)	57	—	—	—	—	—	—	—	—	—	—	—
2011	"Bring It Back" (featuring Niels van Gogh)	—	—	—	—	72	—	—	—	—	—	—	8
2012	"Hardcore Vibes"	—	—	—	—	24	—	—	—	—	73	—	—
2013	"Kids"	—	—	—	—	53	—	—	—	—	61	—	—
2014	"We Are the Nights"	—	—	—	—	—	—	—	—	—	—	—	—
2018	"Hey Girl (Shake It)"	—	—	—	—	—	—	—	—	—	—	—	—
