= You Never Love the Same Way Twice =

1994 single by Rozalla

Single by Rozalla

from the album Look No Further
- Released: 17 October 1994
- Studio: Pure Studios, California
- Genre: Disco; dance-pop"; house
- Length: 4:03
- Label: Epic
- Songwriters: Lamont Dozier; David Munday; Rick Nowels
- Producer: Rick Nowels

Rozalla singles chronology
"This Time I Found Love" (1994)	"You Never Love the Same Way Twice" (1994)	"Baby" (1995)

Music video
- "You Never Love the Same Way Twice" on YouTube

"You Never Love the Same Way Twice" is a song by Zambian-born singer and songwriter Rozalla, released in October 1994, by Epic Records, as the third single from her second album, Look No Further (1995), and later also included on her Best Of album. It was written by Lamont Dozier, David Munday and Rick Nowels, and produced by Nowels. The single was a top-20 hit Scotland and the United Kingdom, during a five-week chart run. In Germany and Iceland, it was a minor hit, and peaked at number 61 on the Eurochart Hot 100 in November 1994. It was also released in the United States in 1995 as the attendant single of the US edition of her second album, reaching number 11 on the Billboard Hot Dance Club Play chart. In 2005, Rozalla re-recorded and re-released the track for a German label.

== Critical reception ==
Larry Flick from Billboard magazine described "You Never Love the Same Way Twice" as "slammin'", and a "disco bauble that tingles with lush strings and a vocal that is commanding without flying out of control." He complimented Rozalla's voice as a "warm, soulful quality that brings this disco-drenched house mover to vibrant life." He concluded with that "this could be the start of Rozalla's long-deserved ascension into the pop spotlight." In his UK chart commentary, James Masterton felt it's "a far more impressive piece of pop dance" than 'This Time I Found Love'. Alan Jones from Music Week gave it three out of five, noting that "she seems to be back on the right track with this smart urban/house song". Tim Jeffery from the Record Mirror Dance Update stated, "Probably her best single since signing to a major", declaring it "a likely hit." Another RM editor, James Hamilton, named it an "attractive ditty" in his weekly dance column. Emma Cochrane from Smash Hits complimented it as "a really upbeat dance track that will make you feel good".

== Track listing ==
- CD single, UK (1994)
1. "You Never Love the Same Way Twice" (K-Klass Klub Mix) — 7:13
2. "You Never Love the Same Way Twice" (Classic Paradise Mix) — 10:07
3. "You Never Love the Same Way Twice" (K-Klass Pharmacy Dub) — 5:37
4. "You Never Love the Same Way Twice" (Soulpower Dungeon Dub) — 7:05
5. "You Never Love the Same Way Twice" (The Development Corporation Mix) — 6:25
- CD maxi, UK and Europe (1994)
1. "You Never Love the Same Way Twice" (Single Version) — 4:06
2. "You Never Love the Same Way Twice" (Classic Paradise Radio Mix) — 3:41
3. "You Never Love the Same Way Twice" (Soulpower Mix) — 5:49
4. "You Never Love the Same Way Twice" (Soulpower Hip Hop Mix) — 5:11
5. "You Never Love the Same Way Twice" (Extended Mix) — 8:27
- CD maxi, US (1995)
1. "You Never Love the Same Way Twice" (Single Version) — 4:07
2. "You Never Love the Same Way Twice" (Rick Nowels Single Mix) — 4:12
3. "You Never Love the Same Way Twice" (Love to Infinity Classic Paradise Radio Mix) — 3:30
4. "You Never Love the Same Way Twice" (Stone & Nick Radio Mix) — 4:17
5. "You Never Love the Same Way Twice" (K-Klass Mix) — 7:11
6. "You Never Love the Same Way Twice" (Gospel Brunch Mix) — 7:30

== Charts ==
=== Weekly charts ===
Chart (1994–1995)	Peak position
Europe (Eurochart Hot 100)	61
Germany (GfK)	54
Iceland (Íslenski Listinn Topp 40)	25
Israel (Israeli Singles Chart)	30
Scottish Singles Sales (Official Charts)	12
UK Singles (Official Charts)	16
UK Dance (Official Charts)	11
UK Hip Hop/R&B (Official Charts)	3
UK Airplay (Music Week)	11
UK Club Chart (Music Week)	16
US Dance Club Songs (Billboard)	11
US Maxi-Singles Sales (Billboard)	30

=== Year-end charts ===
Chart (1994)	Position
UK Singles (OCC)	184
