= San Francisco (Be Sure to Wear Flowers in Your Hair) =

1967 single by Scott McKenzie

- Side A of US vinyl single

Single by Scott McKenzie

from the album The Voice of Scott McKenzie
- B-side: "What's the Difference"
- Released: May 13, 1967
- Recorded: April 1967
- Genre: Pop; psychedelic pop
- Length: 2:58
- Label: Ode 103 (US); Columbia 2757 (UK & Canada)
- Songwriter: John Phillips
- Producers: Lou Adler; John Phillips

Scott McKenzie singles chronology
"No, No, No, No, No" (1966)	"San Francisco (Be Sure to Wear Flowers in Your Hair)" (1967)	"Look in Your Eyes" (1967)

"San Francisco (Be Sure to Wear Flowers in Your Hair)" is an American pop song, written by John Phillips, and sung by Scott McKenzie. It was produced and released in May 1967 by Phillips and Lou Adler, who used it to promote their Monterey International Pop Music Festival held in June of that year.

John Phillips played guitar on the recording and session musician Gary L. Coleman played orchestra bells and chimes. Bass guitar was supplied by session musician Joe Osborn. Hal Blaine played drums. The song reached the fourth position on the US charts and the number one spot on the UK charts. In Ireland, it was number one for one week, in New Zealand the song spent five weeks at number one, and in Germany it was six weeks at number one.

McKenzie's version has been called "the unofficial anthem of the counterculture movement of the 1960s, including the Hippie, Anti-Vietnam War and Flower power movements." The song has also been widely regarded as a defining song of the Summer of Love along with the Beatles' "All You Need Is Love".

== Composition ==
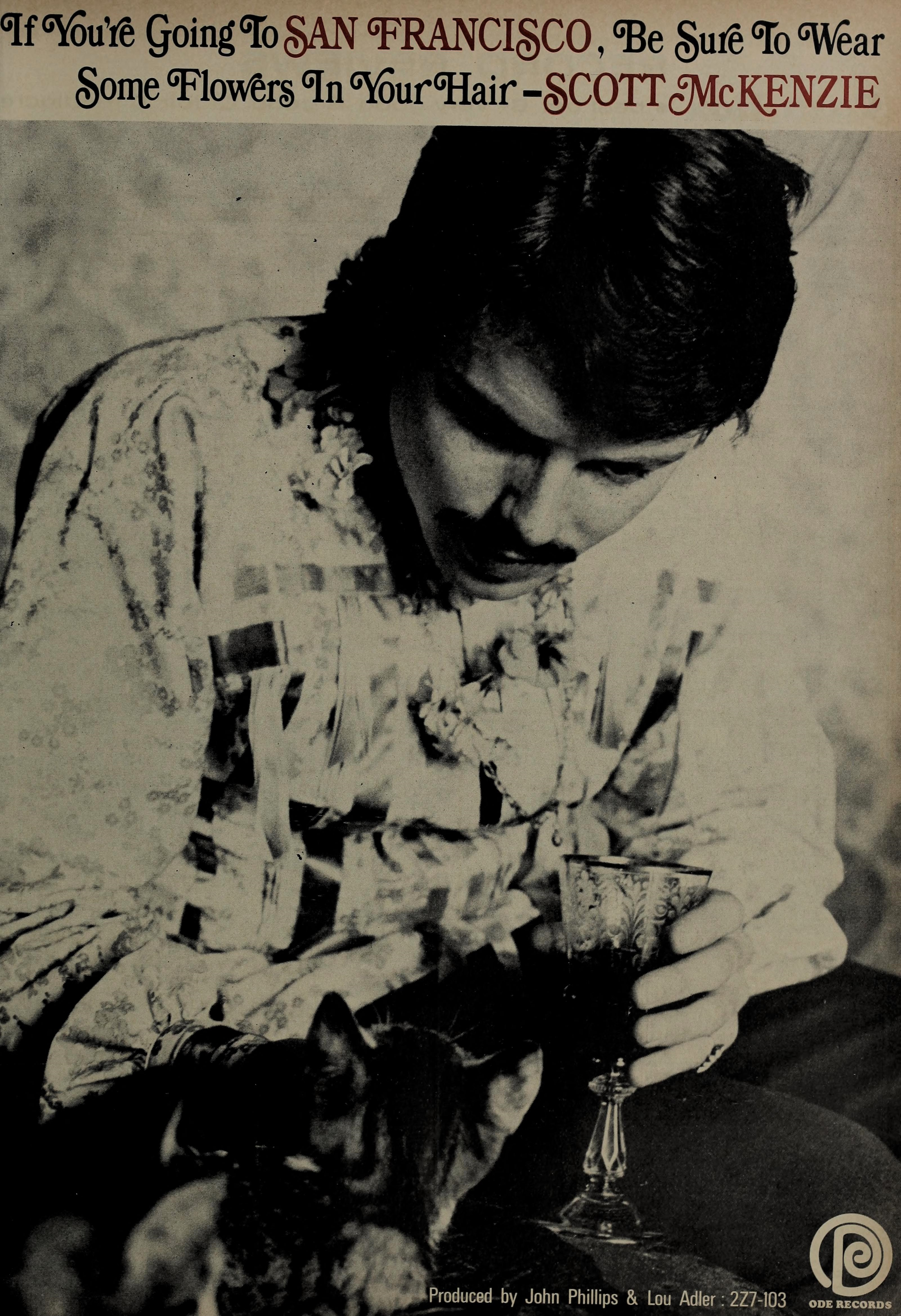
Cashbox advertisement, May 13, 1967

According to Paul Ingles of NPR (National Public Radio), "...local authorities in Monterey were starting to get cold feet over the prospect of their town being overrun by hippies. To smooth things over, Phillips wrote a song, "San Francisco (Be Sure To Wear Flowers In Your Hair)." Phillips reported writing the song in about 20 minutes.

The song is credited with bringing thousands of young people to San Francisco during the late 1960s.

Different issues of the recording use slightly different titles, including: "San Francisco (Be Sure to Wear Flowers in Your Hair)"; "San Francisco (Be Sure to Wear Some Flowers in Your Hair)"; and "San Francisco 'Wear Some Flowers in Your Hair'".

== Reception ==
Released on May 13, 1967, the song was an instant hit. By the week ending July 1, 1967, it reached the number four spot on the Billboard Hot 100 in the US, where it remained for four consecutive weeks. Meanwhile, the song rose to number one in the UK Singles Chart, and most of Europe. In July 1967, McKenzie's previous record label, Capitol, claimed that the "follow-up" to this was their re-release of his earlier single, "Look in Your Eyes." The single is said to have sold over seven million copies worldwide.

The song has been featured in several films, including Frantic (1988), The Rock (1996) and Forrest Gump (1994). It was also played occasionally by Led Zeppelin as part of the improvised section in the middle of "Dazed and Confused". U2's Bono also led the audience in a sing-along during their PopMart performances in the San Francisco Bay Area on June 18 and 19, 1997. New Order covered it on July 11, 2014, at the Bill Graham Civic Auditorium in San Francisco. A cover by Michael Marshall appears in the film The Last Black Man in San Francisco (2019). A cover by Rufus Wainwright was used in the first episode of Star Trek: Starfleet Academy, played over a montage of the USS Athena docking at Starfleet Academy.

== Personnel ==
- Scott McKenzie – double-tracked vocals, acoustic guitar
- John Phillips – acoustic guitar, 12 String electric lead guitar, sitar, production
- Joe Osborn – bass guitar
- Gary L Coleman – orchestral bells and chimes
- Hal Blaine – drums, percussion

== Chart history ==
=== Weekly charts ===
Chart (1967)	Peak position
Australia (Go-Set)	2
Austria (Ö3 Austria Top 40)	1
Belgium (Ultratop 50 Flanders)	1
Belgium (Ultratop 50 Wallonia)	1
Canada Top Singles (RPM)	2
Ireland (IRMA)	1
Netherlands (Single Top 100)	1
Finland (Finnish Singles Chart)	1
France (SNEP)	93
Germany (GfK)	1
New Zealand (Listener)	1
Norway (VG-lista)	1
Switzerland (Schweizer Hitparade)	8
UK Singles (Official Charts)	1
US Billboard Hot 100	4
US Cash Box Top 100	4

=== Year-end charts ===
Chart (1967)	Rank
Australia	13
Austria (Ö3 Austria Top 40)	8
Belgium (Ultratop 50 Flanders)	2
Canada	34
Netherlands (Dutch Top 40)	2
UK Singles	3
U.S. Billboard Hot 100	48
U.S. Cash Box	71

=== Certifications ===
Region	Certification	Certified units/sales
United Kingdom (BPI)	Silver	200,000^{‡}
^{‡} Sales+streaming figures based on certification alone.

== Johnny Hallyday version ==
"San Francisco"

Single by Johnny Hallyday

from the album Johnny au Palais des sports
- Language: French
- B-side: "Mon fils"
- Released: October 20, 1967
- Recorded: Summer–fall 1967
- Genre: Pop, psychedelic pop
- Length: 3:55
- Label: Philips
- Songwriters: John Phillips; Georges Aber (French adaptation)
- Producer: Lee Hallyday

Johnny Hallyday singles chronology
"Petite fille" (1967)	"San Francisco" (1967)	"L'histoire de Bonnie and Clyde" (1968)

French singer Johnny Hallyday recorded the song in French, with the title "San Francisco". His version reached number five in Wallonia (French Belgium) in 1967, the song was released in October 1967.

=== Track listings ===
7-inch single Philips B 370.454 F (1967)

1. "San Francisco" (3:10)
2. "Mon fils" (4:00)

7-inch EP Philips 437.380 BE (1967)

A1. "San Francisco" (3:10)
A2. "Fleurs d'amour et d'amitié" (2:39)
B1. "Mon fils" (3:58)
B2. "Psychédélic" (3:20)

=== Charts ===
"San Francisco" / "Mon fils"

Chart (1967–68)	Peak position
Belgium (Ultratop 50 Wallonia)	5

== Other covers ==
American rock band Greta Van Fleet is also known to have covered the song live during their early career. Traces of the song can be heard in their unreleased song called "Written in Gold". This version of the song is very reminiscent to the version heard on The Song Remains the Same by Led Zeppelin, which the band is often compared to in terms of style and influences.

The song was sampled in the Global Deejays song "The Sound of San Francisco" and the Green Day song "21 Guns".

A cover by vocalist Rufus Wainwright appeared in the pilot episode of Star Trek: Starfleet Academy, "Kids These Days".

== See also ==
- 1967 in music
- Best-selling singles worldwide
- Counterculture of the 1960s
- Summer of Love
