= I Love Music (The O'Jays song) =

1975 single by the O'Jays

"I Love Music (Part I)"

Single by the O'Jays

from the album Family Reunion
- B-side: "I Love Music (Part II)"
- Released: October 1975
- Recorded: 1975
- Studio: Sigma Sound, Philadelphia, Pennsylvania
- Genre: Philadelphia soul; disco
- Length: 3:37 (radio edit); 6:51 (full version)
- Label: Philadelphia International
- Songwriters: Kenneth Gamble; Leon Huff
- Producer: Gamble and Huff

The O'Jays singles chronology
| "Let Me Make Love to You" (1975) | "I Love Music (Part I)" (1975) | "Livin' for the Weekend" (1976) |

"I Love Music" is a song by American R&B group the O'Jays. It was written by production team Gamble and Huff. The song appeared on the O'Jays 1975 album, Family Reunion. The single reached number five on the US Billboard Hot 100 and number one on the soul singles chart. In the UK, the song peaked at number 13 in the Top 40 singles charts in March 1976. The single spent eight weeks at number one on the US Disco File Top 20 chart.

Because of the song's length of 6:51, only the first part of the song received the airplay of 3:37. This song is noteworthy for the use of the Bongos, heard in the intro, as well as the electric guitar solo, heard in the instrumental second part of the song. Also, the saxophone solos are heard between the choruses and the verses and bridges. Strings, trumpets, bass, piano, vibes, and drums dominate the accompaniment of the song.

== Charts ==
=== Weekly charts ===
Weekly chart performance for "I Love Music" by the O'Jays
| Chart (1975–1976) | Peak position |
|---|---|
| Canada Top Singles (RPM) | 9 |
| UK Singles (OCC) | 13 |
| US Billboard Hot 100 | 5 |
| US Disco Action (Billboard) | 1 |
| US Hot Soul Singles (Billboard) | 1 |
| US Cash Box Top 100 | 7 |

=== Year-end charts ===
1976 year-end chart performance for "I Love Music" by the O'Jays
| Chart (1976) | Rank |
|---|---|
| Canada Top Singles (RPM) | 104 |
| US Billboard Hot 100 | 52 |
| US Cash Box Top 100 | 73 |

== Other cover versions ==
In 1976, a live cover version appears on the album LIVE performed by 3M Productions, also known as Major Harris, Blue Magic and Margie Joseph, recorded at the Latin Casino. In 1990, Chicago House music vocalist Darryl Pandy released a version of the song on Warner Bros. Records which remained faithful to the original version. The track featured a prominent keyboard riff, brass, and a driving House beat.

== Rozalla version ==
"I Love Music"

Single by Rozalla

from the album Look No Further
- Released: November 1993
- Genre: Disco
- Length: 4:02
- Label: Epic
- Songwriter: Kenny Gamble & Leon Huff
- Producer: Jellybean

Rozalla singles chronology
| "Are You Ready to Fly" (1992) | "I Love Music" (1993) | "This Time I Found Love" (1994) |

Music video
- "I Love Music" on YouTube

The Zambian-born singer Rozalla covered "I Love Music" for her second album, Look No Further (1995). It was released by Epic Records in the United States in November 1993 and in the United Kingdom on January 22, 1994. Her version of the song was produced by Jellybean and also appeared on the soundtrack to the 1993 film Carlito's Way, starring Al Pacino. Rozalla's recording of "I Love Music" reached number-one on the US Billboard Dance Club Play chart. It also entered the Billboard Hot 100, peaking at number 76. In Europe, the song reached number 18 on the UK Singles Chart in 1994. The song also peaked at number five in Iceland, number six in Finland, and number nine in Zimbabwe.

=== Critical reception ===
The song received favorable reviews from many music critics. Barry Walters from The Advocate deemed it a "respectful rendering". Larry Flick from Billboard magazine described it as a "spirited reading of the O'Jays classic". He noted that Rozalla "has developed a smoother, more soulful vocal quality". Gil L. Robertson IV from Cash Box named it a standout track of the Look No Further album. Dave Sholin from the Gavin Report wrote, "International sensation Rozalla and producer Jellybean extract every ounce of excitement out of this 1976 O'Jays hit." Alan Jones from Music Week said, "Though she acquits herself well, not one of the mixes approaches the classy exaltation of the original. For all that, this is sure to give Rozalla yet another hit." In 1994, another Music Week editor, Andy Beevers, gave it a score of four out of five, calling it a "rather routine Jellybean-produced cover". Wendi Cermak from The Network Forty named it "a fabulous remake". Mark Sutherland from UK magazine Smash Hits was negative and deemed it "an inutterably duff discoed-up version of the O'Jays "classic" (which was pretty useless in the first place)".

=== Charts ===
==== Weekly charts ====
Weekly chart performance for "I Love Music" by Rozalla
| Chart (1993–1994) | Peak position |
|---|---|
| Australia (ARIA) | 90 |
| Canada Dance/Urban (RPM) | 1 |
| Europe (Eurochart Hot 100) | 36 |
| Europe (European Dance Radio) | 3 |
| Europe (European Hit Radio) | 27 |
| Finland (Suomen virallinen lista) | 6 |
| Germany (Media Control Charts) | 69 |
| Iceland (Íslenski Listinn Topp 40) | 5 |
| Israel (Israeli Singles Chart) | 30 |
| New Zealand (Recorded Music NZ) | 39 |
| Quebec (ADISQ) | 50 |
| UK Singles (OCC) | 18 |
| UK Airplay (Music Week) | 8 |
| UK Dance (Music Week) | 6 |
| UK Club Chart (Music Week) | 11 |
| US Billboard Hot 100 | 76 |
| US Dance Club Play (Billboard) | 1 |
| US Maxi-Singles Sales (Billboard) | 18 |
| US Cash Box Top 100 | 67 |
| Zimbabwe (ZIMA) | 9 |

==== Year-end charts ====
1994 year-end chart performance for "I Love Music" by Rozalla
| Chart (1994) | Position |
|---|---|
| Canada Dance/Urban (RPM) | 13 |
| Europe (European Dance Radio) | 19 |
| Iceland (Íslenski Listinn Topp 40) | 59 |
| US Dance Club Play (Billboard) | 20 |

== Usage in film ==
The song appears in the 1993 film Carlito's Way and in the 2007 film Pride.
