= Faith (In the Power of Love) =

1991 single by Rozalla

Single by Rozalla

from the album Everybody's Free
- Released: April 1991
- Genre: Diva house
- Length: 3:42
- Label: Pulse-8
- Songwriters: Nigel Swanston; Tim Cox
- Producer: Band of Gypsies

Rozalla singles chronology
"Everybody's Free (To Feel Good)" (1991)	"Faith (In the Power of Love)" (1991)	"Are You Ready to Fly" (1992)

Music video
- "Faith (In the Power of Love)" on YouTube

"Faith (In the Power of Love)" is a song by Zambian-born singer Rozalla, released in April 1991 by label Pulse-8 as the third single from her second album, Everybody's Free (1992). It was written by Nigel Swanston and Tim Cox, and produced by Band of Gypsies. The single first charted in the UK in April 1991, reaching No. 65 on the UK Singles Chart. It was re-released in November of that year after the success of her previous single, "Everybody's Free (To Feel Good)", peaking this time at No. 11. The song met with similar success throughout the rest of Europe, although some countries skipped this release in favour of her next single "Are You Ready to Fly". The song did not see a release in the US until 1993, when it peaked at No. 4 on the Billboard Dance Club Play chart. The song was used for the soundtrack of the 1991 Vanilla Ice-starring film Cool as Ice.

== Critical reception ==
AllMusic editor William Cooper wrote that on the song, Rozalla "manages to squeeze in more house-oriented grooves". Larry Flick of Billboard magazine named it "yet another potential No. 1 hit. Song-wise, this is far more satisfying in melodic structure and lyrical content than the previous 'Are You Ready to Fly'. Its anthemic stance is given depth by a vocal that is not nearly as over the top as in the past." British Fact ranked "Faith (In the Power of Love)" at 20 in their list of "21 Diva-House Belters That Still Sound Incredible" in 2014. Joe Muggs said, "Never a massive pop hit like 'Everybody's Free' (though it did make it to number 11), and yeah alright, this one is pretty high in sugar – but go on, give yourself up to it and revel in the fact there was a period of pop culture when these lyrics were not only acceptable but normal."

James Hamilton from Music Week named it Pick of the Week in the category of Dance, describing the track as a "girl wailed jumpy powerful galloper." Record Mirror wrote that "Rozalla's got a great voice and the Band of Gypsies produce a fine house backing for her". The reviewer added further that "like 'Born to Love Ya', this starts with uplifting piano and continues in much same garagey vein. It's got a superb searing '70s synth horn melody, memorable chorus chants, a vibesy bridge and bright beats." Marc Andrews from Smash Hits stated that "it should easily find itself a cheery wee home inside the charts for Zimbabwe's most famous daughter."

== Remixes ==
"Faith (In the Power of Love)" was remixed in 2004 by Way Out West and again in 2006 by Ian Carey.

== Charts ==
=== Weekly charts ===
Chart (1991–1993)	Peak position
Australia (ARIA)	62
Belgium (Ultratop 50 Flanders)	13
Canada Dance/Urban (RPM)	6
Europe (Eurochart Hot 100)	54
Finland (Suomen virallinen lista)	11
Ireland (IRMA)	14
Netherlands (Dutch Top 40)	14
Netherlands (Single Top 100)	18
Spain (AFYVE)	11
UK Singles (OCC)	11
UK Airplay (Music Week)	7
UK Dance (Music Week)	3
UK Club Chart (Record Mirror)	6
US Dance Club Play (Billboard)	4
US Maxi-Singles Sales (Billboard)	3

=== Year-end charts ===
Chart (1991)	Position
UK Club Chart (Record Mirror)	10

Chart (1993)	Position
Canada Dance/Urban (RPM)	42

== Release history ==
Region	Date	Format(s)	Label(s)	Ref.
United Kingdom	April 1991	—N/a	Pulse-8	
United Kingdom (re-release)	4 November 1991	7-inch vinyl; 12-inch vinyl; CD; cassette	Pulse-8	
Australia	24 February 1992	12-inch vinyl; CD; cassette	Liberation	
