= Rozalla =

Zimbabwean electronic and dance musician

- Born: Rozalla Miller; 18 March 1964 (age 62); Ndola, Northern Rhodesia (now Zambia)
- Genres: Electronic; house; eurodance; breakbeat
- Years active: 1989–present
- Labels: Epic, Pulse 8

Rozalla Miller (born 18 March 1964), better known as simply Rozalla, is a Zambian and Zimbabwean electronic music performer who was born in what was then Northern Rhodesia (now Zambia). She is best known for her three 1991/92 hit singles "Faith (In the Power of Love)", "Are You Ready to Fly", and particularly "Everybody's Free (To Feel Good)", which has been remixed and re-issued several times. In December 2016, Billboard magazine ranked her as the 98th-most-successful dance artist of all time.

== Musical career ==
Rozalla began performing at a young age in her native Zambia singing in clubs and at events; then at age 13, she was singing on a children's TV show. Still in her teens, she relocated to Zimbabwe where she fronted various R&B cover bands before beginning her own recording career leading to five number-one hits on that nation's chart. In 1988, Rozalla relocated to London with her manager Chris Sergeant and worked with the Band of Gypsies, a production duo consisting of Nigel Swanston and Tim Cox.

Rozalla's first UK single "Born to Luv Ya" became a club hit in 1990. The singer's career really took off when the dance anthem "Everybody's Free (To Feel Good)", reached number 6 on the UK Singles Chart in 1991. It became a top 10 hit in many European countries soon afterwards and reached the Billboard Top 40 the following year. It remains her biggest hit to date. It was later included on her debut album Everybody's Free, which peaked at number 20 on the UK Albums Chart and went silver. The album spawned two more sizeable hits in "Faith (In the Power of Love)" and "Are You Ready to Fly", reaching number 11 and 14, respectively, on the UK Singles Chart, plus a lower-charting single with the ballad "Love Breakdown". In May 1992, Rozalla performed at the World Music Awards in Monaco, where she received an award for Best-Selling African Artist.

In 1992, Rozalla toured with Michael Jackson, opening all of his shows on the European leg of his Dangerous Tour, including the UK. She enjoyed four UK top 40 hits in 1994/95, including her rendition of "I Love Music", the theme song to the film Carlito's Way. The attendant album Look No Further featured more R&B and soul elements than her previous album.

A 1996 remix of "Everybody's Free" reached number 30 on the UK Singles Chart. Her 1998 album Coming Home saw her reunite with the Band of Gypsies and spawned a stateside club hit with its lead single "Don't Go Lose It Baby", produced by Metro.

In 2003, Rozalla entered the lower regions of the UK Singles Chart alongside Plastic Boy with the song "Live Another Life". She issued the jazz/soul album Brand New Version in 2009, adding her surname Miller to her recording guise. She promoted the album by performing as Billy Ocean's support act on his UK tour of 2009. A Global Deejays remix of "Everybody's Free" reached number 7 in Australia in 2009 after it had been used as the theme song to So You Think You Can Dance.

In 2015, Rozalla returned to the top 10 of the Billboard Club Dance charts for the first time since 1994 with her track "If You Say It Again".

In February 2024, Rozalla released the album Turn On the Light.

== Discography ==
=== Studio albums ===
List of albums, with selected chart positions
Title	Album details	Peak chart positions					
Title	Album details	AUS	GER	NED	SWE	SWI	UK
Spirit of Africa	Released: 1989 (limited release); Format: CD; Label: Tusk Music	—	—	—	—	—	—
Everybody's Free	Released: 1992; Format: CD, LP, CS; Label: Pulse-8, Epic	75	53	62	36	31	20
Look No Further	Released: 1995; Format: CD, CS; Label: Epic	—	—	—	—	—	138
Coming Home	Released: 1998; Format: CD; Label: RM Records, Polygram	—	—	—	—	—	—
Brand New Version	Released: 2009; Format: CD; Label:	—	—	—	—	—	—
Turn On the Light	Released: 26 February 2024; Format: CD, vinyl, digital; Label: Energise Records	—	—	—	—	—	—

=== Compilation albums ===
- 1993: Everybody's Free - Style 1993 - Remixed to Perfection
- 1998: Feelin' Good
- 2003: Best Of
- 2004: Everybody's Free (Special Edition with DVD)

=== Singles ===
Year	Single	Peak chart positions											Certifications (sales thresholds)	Album
Year	Single	AUS	AUT	FRA	GER	IRE	NED	NZ	SWE	SWI	UK	US Club	Certifications (sales thresholds)	Album
1990	"Born to Luv Ya"	—	—	—	—	—	—	—	—	—	126	—		Everybody's Free
1991	"Everybody's Free (To Feel Good)"	11	10	8	6	8	2	9	4	2	6	1	UK: Silver	Everybody's Free
1991	"Faith (In the Power of Love)"	62	—	—	—	14	14	—	—	—	11	4		Everybody's Free
1992	"Are You Ready to Fly"	88	21	11	25	16	32	—	15	6	14	1		Everybody's Free
1992	"Love Breakdown"	—	—	33	—	—	—	—	—	—	65	—		Everybody's Free
1992	"In 4 Choons Later"	—	—	—	—	—	—	—	—	—	50	—		Single only
1993	"Don't Play with Me"	—	—	—	—	—	—	—	—	—	50	—		Everybody's Free - Style 1993
1994	"I Love Music"	90	—	—	69	—	—	39	—	—	18	1		Look No Further
1994	"This Time I Found Love"	—	—	—	—	—	—	—	—	—	33	—		Look No Further
1994	"You Never Love the Same Way Twice"	—	—	—	54	—	—	—	—	—	16	11		Look No Further
1995	"Baby"	233	—	—	—	—	—	—	—	—	26	—		Look No Further
1995	"Losing My Religion"	—	—	—	—	—	—	—	—	—	—	—		Look No Further
1996	"Everybody's Free (Ca$ino Mix)"	—	—	—	—	—	—	—	—	—	30	14		Single only
1997	"Coming Home"	—	—	—	—	—	—	—	—	—	137	—		Coming Home
1998	"Don't Go Lose It Baby"	—	—	—	—	—	—	—	—	—	134	23		Coming Home
1998	"Friday Night" (with Phat 'N' Phunky)	—	—	—	—	—	—	—	—	—	76	—		Singles only
2003	"Live Another Life" (with Plastic Boy)	—	—	—	—	—	—	—	—	—	55	—		Singles only
2014	"Can You Feel the Love" (with David Anthony)	—	—	—	—	—	—	—	—	—	—	—		Singles only
2015	"Say It Again"	—	—	—	—	—	—	—	—	—	—	5		Singles only
2019	"Turn On the Light"	—	—	—	—	—	—	—	—	—	—	—		Turn On the Light
2020	"Magnificent"	—	—	—	—	—	—	—	—	—	—	—		Turn On the Light
2022	"The Christmas Song (Chestnuts Roasting on an Open Fire)"	—	—	—	—	—	—	—	—	—	—	—		Single only
2023	"Lovefool"	—	—	—	—	—	—	—	—	—	—	—		Turn On the Light
2024	"Lotta Love"	—	—	—	—	—	—	—	—	—	—	—		Turn On the Light
2024	"You and I"	—	—	—	—	—	—	—	—	—	—	—		Turn On the Light
"—" denotes releases that did not chart or were not released.

== See also ==
- Timeline of Billboard number-one dance songs
- List of artists who reached number one on the U.S. Dance Club Songs chart
