= Everybody's Free (album) =

- Original cover (outside North America)

Studio album by Rozalla
- Released: 1992
- Studio: Townhouse
- Label: Pulse-8; Epic
- Producer: 3MI (Nigel Swanston and Tim Cox)

Rozalla chronology
Everybody's Free (1992)	Look No Further (1995)

Everybody's Free is the debut album by Zambian electronic music performer Rozalla, released in 1992. The album includes the worldwide hit single "Everybody's Free (To Feel Good)" along with three further singles: "Faith (In the Power of Love)", "Are You Ready to Fly" and "Love Breakdown". It also includes a remix of the single "Born to Luv Ya", originally released in 1990. There are two different album covers: the original shown here and an American version that was issued by Epic Records after Rozalla signed with the label in 1992. The album received an award for "Album of the Year" at the 1993 Hi-NRG Music Awards in New York.

== Critical reception ==
Professional ratings
Review scores
Source	Rating
AllMusic	3/5 stars
The Encyclopedia of Popular Music	3/5 stars

AllMusic editor William Cooper said, "Strong tunes and capable vocals make Everybody's Free a solid and consistent debut effort." Amy Linden from Entertainment Weekly wrote, "Rozalla’s blend of pop smarts and rave’s abandon is light-years beyond the standard-issue diva wail, and is one of the best dance records of ’92."

== Track listing ==
All tracks written by Tim Cox and Nigel Swanston, except where noted.

1. "Everybody's Free (To Feel Good)"
2. "Faith (In the Power of Love)"
3. "You and Me"
4. "Heart Is in Africa" (Tim Cox, Rozalla Miller, Nigel Swanston)
5. "The Storybook of Love"
6. "Don't Play with Me (Unless It's for Real)"
7. "Are You Ready to Fly"
8. "Lost in Your Ocean"
9. "Hear Me Calling" (Tim Cox, Rozalla Miller, Nigel Swanston)
10. "Love Breakdown"
11. "Believe in Yourself"
12. "Born to Love You (1992)"

== Personnel ==
- Rozalla Miller – vocals
- Band of Gypsies (Nigel Swanston, Tim Cox) – production, mixing, all instruments

== Charts and certifications ==
=== Weekly charts ===
Chart (1992)	Peak position
Australian Albums Chart	75
Dutch Albums Chart	62
German Albums Chart	53
Swedish Albums Chart	36
Swiss Albums Chart	31
UK Albums Chart	20

=== Certifications ===
Region	Certification	Certified units/sales
United Kingdom (BPI)	Silver	60,000^{^}
^{^} Shipments figures based on certification alone.
