= Everybody's Free (To Feel Good) =

1991 single by Rozalla

- One of variants of the standard artwork

Single by Rozalla

from the album Everybody's Free
- B-side: "Everybody's Free" (Free Bemba Mix)
- Released: 26 August 1991
- Studio: Peer Music (London, England)
- Genre: Eurodance; breakbeat; rave
- Length: 3:40 (7-inch radio edit); 6:40 (12-inch club mix)
- Label: Pulse-8
- Songwriters: Nigel Swanston; Tim Cox
- Producer: Band of Gypsies

Rozalla singles chronology
"Born to Luv Ya" (1990)	"Everybody's Free (To Feel Good)" (1991)	"Faith (In the Power of Love)" (1991)

Music video
- "Everybody's Free" on YouTube

"Everybody's Free (To Feel Good)" is a song by Zambian-born Zimbabwean singer Rozalla, released in August 1991 by label Pulse-8 as the second single from her second album, Everybody's Free (1992). The song was written by Nigel Swanston and Tim Cox, and produced by Band of Gypsies. It had been a staple in the clubs in Ibiza and Mallorca in the summer of 1991, and hordes of recovering ravers were delighted to find "that tune about being free to feel good and stuff" was available to buy back home. Upon its release, the song reached number two in Belgium, the Netherlands and Spain, while entering the top 10 in Denmark, France, Germany, Ireland, Sweden, Switzerland and the United Kingdom. On the Eurochart Hot 100, the single reached number six, and in Zimbabwe, it peaked at number four. It also topped the US Billboard Hot Dance Club Play chart. Several music videos have been made to promote the song. It is widely regarded as one of the biggest dance anthems of the 1990s and it has been remixed and re-released several times.

== Background ==
Rozalla was born in Zambia, but relocated to Zimbabwe at the age at eighteen. After fronting various bands, she began her own recording career ending up with five number one hits on Zimbabwe's national charts. In 1989, she was invited to London by Chris Sergeant to perform with the Band of Gypsies. Rozalla's first UK single was "Born to Luv Ya", which was a club hit in 1990. However, it was with her dance anthem "Everybody's Free (To Feel Good)" that her career took off.

== Recording ==
Rozalla had sent around some cassettes trying to get a record deal, and one of these tapes ended up with the Band of Gypsies. They loved her voice and contacted her for a collaboration. "Everybody's Free (To Feel Good)" was recorded in the Peer Music studio, in a basement on Denmark Street in London's West End. In the 2017 book, Stars of 90's Dance Pop: 29 Hitmakers Discuss Their Careers by James Arena, Rozalla told about the making of the song, "Nigel [Swanston] gave me the song to sing, or at least the chorus, but I should mention that I couldn't sing any song exactly the way the writer or producer might necessarily have wanted me to. I always had to personalize it. Well, I went in and sang the chorus over and over until we had a sound that everyone loved. We played the chorus on the studio speakers, and we just knew we had it—our hook. That put Nigel on the next level to find the verses, the storyline so-to-speak, to go with the chorus."

== Chart performances ==
"Everybody's Free (To Feel Good)" first charted in the United Kingdom in 1991, peaking at number six on 29 September. It made the top 40 best-selling UK singles of 1991, at position 40. The success soon crossed over to the rest of Europe, where the single reached number two in Belgium, the Netherlands and Spain. It entered the top 10 also in Denmark (9), France (8), Germany (6), Ireland (8), Sweden (6) and Switzerland (3), as well as on the Eurochart Hot 100, where it peaked at number six in January 1992. Additionally, "Everybody's Free (To Feel Good)" was a top-20 hit in Austria (18), Finland (13), Italy (19) and Luxembourg (14). Outside Europe, the song peaked at number-one on the Billboard Hot Dance Club Play chart in the United States and number two on the RPM Dance/Urban chart in Canada. In Oceania, it reached numbers 11 and 14 in Australia and New Zealand, respectively. In West Asia, it became a top-20 hit in Israel, peaking at number 17 on 15 October 1991.

The song was not released in the United States until 1992, when Rozalla was signed to Epic Records after a sought-after bidding war. It performed extremely well on the Hot Dance Club Play chart, climbing to number one. On the Billboard Hot 100 chart, the track was a top 40 hit, reaching number 37.

== Critical reception ==
Barry Walters from The Advocate complimented the song as "fabulous". AllMusic editor William Cooper described it as a "catchy, cathartic rave anthem that managed to cross over to the Top 40 pop charts." Larry Flick from Billboard magazine deemed it "bright and invigorating", and "imbued with anthemic U.S. house vibes and lush Euro-disco execution". He also viewed it as a "brain-embedding anthem", and complimented the singer's "crystalline voice." Amy Linden from Entertainment Weekly called it "soaring". She stated that Rozalla "radiates independence" and "seizes the mystical, richly textured, techno-house reins and rides, stating her case with total clarity and power, injecting heart and depth into a genre that is often soulless." Dave Sholin from the Gavin Report noted that "one of the most electrifying tracks around is far from new to audiences around the world. Just think of a country and chances are good that this has been #1 there. Following some lengthy delays on the official U.S. release, here it is ready to explode at Top 40."

Davydd Chong from Music Week's RM Dance Update called it both "pulsating" and "anthemic". Another RM editor, James Hamilton, described it as a "moodily started then scampering and raving jangly Italo style cheerful galloper". In a retrospective review, Pop Rescue wrote that "Everybody's Free" "really showcases Rozalla's vocal range", declaring it as "brilliant". Mark Coleman from Rolling Stone felt "it's unforgettable once it gets under your skin. There's a subtle African rhythmic influence bubbling under the raving synth lines, and Rozalla pulls a bittersweet melody out of the hedonistic chorus." Another Rolling Stone editor, Al Weisel described it as an "ecstatic" single. Anita Naik from Smash Hits named it an "ear-splitting rave number". The magazine's Marc Andrews felt it "contained one of the most memorable spazz drum "sequences" in recent history". Jonathan Bernstein from Spin wrote, "Lumbered with the misnomer "Queen of Rave", this Zambian minx strikes a mighty blow for her side in the up-to-now unequal battle of woman against machine. With grace and grit, Rozalla transforms the standard house thump into a living, breathing, beating heart."

== Music video ==
Various music videos exist for "Everybody's Free (To Feel Good)". One of them, a semi-live performance video directed by Nick Burgess-Jones for Rozalla's original label Pulse 8, first aired in September 1991. In the United States, Epic had Rozalla record a different video (shot in New York City). Rozalla also shot a video for her 1996 remix in Africa and another for the 2002 version with German Eurodance group Aquagen. Australian TV network Ten and affiliates used the Global Deejays remix to advertise the 2009 series of So You Think You Can Dance Australia.

== Remixes ==
"Everybody's Free (To Feel Good)" has been remixed various times. In 1996, a remix reached number 30 on the UK Singles Chart. In 2000, she re-recorded with Richard 'Humpty' Vission and had a minor US dance hit. In 2002 came the Aquagen remix of the song, which reached number 22 in Germany, followed by a Delerium & Faze remix in 2005. The following year came from Italian Kortezman the new remix of the song. A shortened version of the Aquagen remix was used in the introduction to The Venture Bros. episode "Powerless in the Face of Death". In 2015, the single received an updated remix, billed as the "Crazy Ibiza Remix," which Rozalla loved, and then commented on her Facebook page thanking the fans and mixers who continue to keep the song alive to this day.

== Impact and legacy ==
"Everybody's Free (To Feel Good)" won an award in the category for Best hi-NRG 12-inch Single on the 1993 WMC International Dance Music Awards. Official UK Chart named it their Pop Gem in November 2013, praising it as an "uplifting rave anthem". It was ranked number two in "The Top 10 Dance Tunes Of The '90s" for Attitude in 2016. American entertainment company BuzzFeed ranked it number 47 in their list of "The 101 Greatest Dance Songs of the '90s" in 2017. Vibe ranked the song number 15 in their list of "Before EDM: 30 Dance Tracks from the '90s That Changed the Game" in 2018.

=== Accolades ===
Year	Publisher	Country	Accolade	Rank
1993	WMC International Dance Music Awards	United States	"Best hi-NRG 12-inch Single"	1
2011	Max	Australia	"1000 Greatest Songs of All Time"	580
2011	MTV Dance	United Kingdom	"The 100 Biggest 90's Dance Anthems of All Time"	24
2013	OCC	United Kingdom	"Pop Gem"	1
2013	Vibe	United States	"Before EDM: 30 Dance Tracks from the '90s That Changed the Game"	15
2016	Attitude	United Kingdom	"The Top 10 Dance Tunes of the '90s"	2
2017	BuzzFeed	United States	"The 101 Greatest Dance Songs of the '90s"	47

(*) indicates the list is unordered.

"Everybody's Free (Ca$ino Mix)"

Single by Rozalla
- Released: 1996
- Length: 3:38
- Label: Pulse 8
- Songwriters: Nigel Swanston; Tim Cox
- Producers: Band of Gypsies; Ca$ino

Rozalla singles chronology
"Losing My Religion" (1995)	"Everybody's Free (Ca$ino Mix)" (1996)	"Coming Home" (1997)

== Track listings ==
=== Original version ===
- 7" single
1. "Everybody's Free (To Feel Good)" (free radio mix) – 3:40
2. "Everybody's Free (To Feel Good)" (Free Bemba mix) – 4:00
- 12" maxi
1. "Everybody's Free (To Feel Good)" (original mix) – 6:40
2. "Everybody's Free (To Feel Good)" (Free Bemba mix) – 6:05
- 12" maxi – Italy
1. "Everybody's Free (To Feel Good)" (original mix) – 6:40
2. "Everybody's Free (To Feel Good)" (7" edit) – 3:40
3. "Everybody's Free (To Feel Good)" (Free Bemba mix) – 6:00
- CD single
1. "Everybody's Free (To Feel Good)" (original mix) – 6:40
2. "Everybody's Free (To Feel Good)" (Free Bemba edit) – 3:58
- CD maxi – Australia
1. "Everybody's Free (To Feel Good)" (original mix – edit) – 3:40
2. "Everybody's Free (To Feel Good)" (original mix) – 6:40
3. "Everybody's Free (To Feel Good)" (Free Bemba mix) – 6:10
- CD maxi – France, Belgium
1. "Everybody's Free (To Feel Good)" – 6:40
2. "Everybody's Free (To Feel Good)" (Free Bemba mix) – 6:05
3. "Everybody's Free (To Feel Good)" (a cappella-Italia mix) – 6:06
4. "Everybody's Free (To Feel Good)" (africana mix) – 7:17
- CD maxi – Germany
1. "Everybody's Free (To Feel Good)" (club mix) – 6:40
2. "Everybody's Free (To Feel Good)" (Free Bemba mix) – 5:57
3. "Everybody's Free (To Feel Good)" (free radio mix) – 3:33
- CD maxi – UK
1. "Everybody's Free (To Feel Good)" (original mix) – 6:40
2. "Everybody's Free (To Feel Good)" (Free Bemba mix) – 6:06
3. "Faith (In the Power of Love)" (coola vibes) – 7:23
- Cassette
1. "Everybody's Free (To Feel Good)" (original mix) – 6:40
2. "Everybody's Free (To Feel Good)" (Free Bemba)

=== Aquagen featuring Rozalla version ===
- CD maxi
1. "Everybody's Free" (radio edit) – 3:40
2. "Everybody's Free" (original album version) – 6:35
3. "Everybody's Free" (extended mix) – 8:50
4. "Everybody's Free" (club mix) – 6:10
5. "Everybody's Free" (Dance Nation remix) – 7:23
6. "Everybody's Free" (Green Court remix) – 8:44
7. "Everybody's Free" (Kosmonova remix) – 5:35

=== Global Deejays featuring Rozalla version ===
- CD maxi
1. "Everybody's Free" (General Electric version) – 7:00
2. "Everybody's Free" (2elements mix) – 6:37
3. "Everybody's Free" (Klaas remix) – 6:38
4. "Everybody's Free" (Markito's sunlight remix) – 6:07

== Charts ==
=== Weekly charts ===
==== Original version ====
Chart (1991–1992)	Peak position
Australia (ARIA)	11
Austria (Ö3 Austria Top 40)	18
Belgium (Ultratop 50 Flanders)	2
Canada Retail Singles (The Record)	5
Canada Dance/Urban (RPM)	3
Denmark (IFPI)	9
Europe (Eurochart Hot 100)	6
Europe (European Dance Radio)	8
Europe (European Hit Radio)	20
Finland (Suomen virallinen lista)	13
France (SNEP)	8
Germany (GfK)	6
Ireland (IRMA)	8
Israel (Israeli Singles Chart)	17
Italy (Musica e dischi)	19
Luxembourg (Radio Luxembourg)	14
Netherlands (Dutch Top 40)	2
Netherlands (Single Top 100)	2
New Zealand (Recorded Music NZ)	14
Spain (AFYVE)	2
Sweden (Sverigetopplistan)	6
Switzerland (Schweizer Hitparade)	3
UK Singles (OCC)	6
UK Airplay (Music Week)	22
UK Dance (Music Week)	1
UK Club Chart (Record Mirror)	2
US Billboard Hot 100	37
US Dance Club Play (Billboard)	1
US Maxi-Singles Sales (Billboard)	1
US Cash Box Top 100	39
Zimbabwe (ZIMA)	4

Chart (1996)	Peak position
Europe (Eurochart Hot 100)	85
Scottish Singles Sales (Official Charts)	26
UK Singles (OCC)	30
UK Dance (OCC)	9
UK Club Chart (Music Week)	2
US Dance Club Play (Billboard)	14

==== Remix versions ====
Richard [Humpty] Vission featuring Rozalla

Chart (2000)	Peak position
US Dance Club Play (Billboard)	18

Aquagen featuring Rozalla

Chart (2002)	Peak position
Austria (Ö3 Austria Top 75)	17
Germany (Media Control)	22
Hungary (Single Top 40)	18
Netherlands (Mega Top 100)	61
Switzerland (Schweizer Hitparade)	75

Global Deejays featuring Rozalla

Chart (2007)	Peak position
Netherlands (Mega Top 100)	70

Chart (2009)	Peak position
Australia (ARIA)	7
Austria (Ö3 Austria Top 75)	57

=== Year-end charts ===
Chart (1991)	Position
Belgium (Ultratop 50 Flanders)	33
Netherlands (Dutch Top 40)	19
Netherlands (Single Top 100)	43
UK Singles (OCC)	40
UK Club Chart (Record Mirror)	3

Chart (1992)	Position
Australia (ARIA)	93
Germany (Media Control)	38
Sweden (Topplistan)	46
Switzerland (Schweizer Hitparade)	29
US Dance Club Play (Billboard)	42
US Maxi-Singles Sales (Billboard)	22

== Certifications ==
Certifications for "Everybody's Free (To Feel Good)"
Region	Certification	Certified units/sales
United Kingdom (BPI)	Silver	200,000^{^}
United Kingdom (BPI) DNF vs. Rozalla	Gold	400,000^{‡}
^{^} Shipments figures based on certification alone.^{‡} Sales+streaming figures based on certification alone.

== Cover versions ==
Quindon Tarver performed a choral cover for the 1996 film Romeo + Juliet. His version was later sampled for Baz Luhrmann's single "Everybody's Free (To Wear Sunscreen)".

Blümchen - Ich Bin Wieder Hier (1998) German cover in happy hardcore style.

Global Deejays released a version of "Everybody's Free" in 2008 that was credited to Global Deejays featuring Rozalla. It features guitars and strong dance beats. It was used in television promotions for So You Think You Can Dance Australia and debuted at number 33 on the ARIA Singles Chart. It climbed to number seven, which made it Rozalla's highest-charting single in Australia.

Australian singer Nat Conway released a synthpop cover produced by MNEK on 19 August 2016 as her debut single. In 2015, Conway had performed the track as her audition song on the seventh series of The X Factor Australia. She went on to finish 6th and she signed a record deal with label Sony Music Australia.

Kylie Minogue covered the song for her 2016 album Kylie Christmas: Snow Queen Edition. The cover was used in a Christmas TV advertisement for British pharmacy chain Boots. In 2022, Minogue's version was used in the film Bros.

In the same year, Chase & Status sampled the track's chorus for their song "Spoken Word", featuring George the Poet.

The Finnish EDM producer Jaakko Salovaara, known as JS16, released a cover version on 28 May 2021, featuring Alora & Senii and Felix Ojack.
